= Mokshadacharan Samadhyayi =

Indian politician

Pandit Mokshada Charan Samadhyayi (Mokshada or Mokhoda Charan Bhattacharji or Khasnabis) (1874–?) was a leading figure of the Jugantar movement.

== Student life ==
Born about 1874, Mokshada Charan was son of Shyama Charan Khasnabis of Paikpara, Bikrampur Dhaka district, now in Bangladesh. He spent long years in Benares to have a genuine schooling in the Sanskrit classics and the Vedic texts. G.C. Denham of the Central Criminal Intelligence Department noted: "The position of Benares as a centre of revolutionary activity is very similar to the position which it holds in the religious life of the Hindu inhabitants of India.". He mentioned it as a retreat for political refugees and, since the visit of B.G. Tilak in 1900, followed by the issuing of the Kalidas newspaper, Benares became a congenial spot for seditious activities.

Several amongst the Bengalis in Benares were connected with the revolutionary movement in Kolkata, principally through a certain Suranath Bhaduri, son of Somnath Bhaduri: a curious character, who was ultimately concerned in the conspiracy in Kolkata and afterwards seems to have attempted to sell the information to the authorities.

Somnath was "one of the pioneers of nationalism" in Benares and, in the Bengali year 1309 (1902–03) he published a book called Gangajal, found with Mokhoda at the time of his first arrest at Benares. It conveyed revolutionary lessons under the guise of religion. The writer, addressing the god Sri Krishna says, "The mlechas (here used for foreigners) are carrying away to their own country the riches and intelligence of India, and the Vedas (sacred books) and the religion of India are being trampled under the feet of foreign nations. Wilt thou come and uproot the mlechas and make India free?" To this Sri Krishna replies, "I have come, descending upon India. The auspicious hour is here; in my name advance boldly like heroes." The reference here is to the promise of Sri Krishna contained in a passage in the Bhagavad Gita; Suranath had a good deal to do with the adoption of this verse as the motto of the seditious Yugantar ('Epoch's End') newspaper of Kolkata. Mokhoda was Suranath's associate.

Shortly before the publication of the Yugantar from Kolkata, early March 1906, Mokhada's friend Preonath Karar of Serampore (later known as Sri Yukteswar Giri) reached Benares and, with the help of Hrishikesh Kanjilal of the Kolkata Anushilan Samiti and Suranath, convened a public meeting as well as a meeting of the pundits: by quotations from the Hindu Astrology and Astronomy, it was announced that the sinful Iron Age was over and it was now the dawn of Yugantar or the Dvapara Yuga. Hrishikesh undertook a tour of pilgrimage to proclaim the advent of the New Age and incite the sannyasis (roving monks) in a rebellion against the English.

== Revolutionary contacts ==
Already in September 1905, inspired by Sri Aurobindo, the ministers of Hindu religion were to spread the anti-Partition agitation. A.C. Banerji, Barrister-at-Law from Santipur in Nadia and a friend of Jatindranath Mukherjee, obtained the aid of the Nabadwip Pundits and Goswamis : their influence, throughout India, roused the religious scruples of both Hindus and Muslims concerning the impurity in the manufacture of salt and sugar, as much as their boycott of foreign goods. As it will be presently seen, Mokhoda was a close collaborator of Kartik Datta of Santipur.

Under Mokhoda's leadership, the Bhatpara Pundits in the 24 Parganas sent out missionaries in Upper India. At Puri in Orissa, one hundred itinerant monks had vowed to preach the Swadeshi. On 28 September 1905, fifty thousand people before the Kolkata Kali temple took the vow of abstaining from purchasing foreign goods. The Ramakrishna Mission and the Arya Samaj considerably helped spreading this doctrine.

Admitting that Mokhoda studied Sanskrit for many years at Benares and earned the Pandit title of Samadhyayi, Denham informed that he was posted at the Uttarpara College in the Hooghly district. Mokhoda, in company of Professor Charu Chandra Ray, Preonath Karar (Sri Yukteswar Giri) and Satish Sen, animated the clubs and associations in the region covering Chinsura, Serampore, Chandernagore with the teachings of Bankim Chandra Chatterjee (who had lived there), Yogendra Vidyabhushan and other thought leaders of the epoch. He frequented the revolutionary monk Tarakshepa who, sermoning on the Bhagavad Gita, preached sedition overtly. Informed about a dynamic batch of students in the neighbouring 24 Parganas, Mokhoda went to Chingripota, Harinabhi, Kodalia, where Harikumar Chakravarti, Naren Bhattacharya alias M.N. Roy, Saileshwar Bose, Satkari Banerji had started a powerful association. Harikumar was in touch with his cousins, Naren and Phani Chakravarti, who had been to school with Barin Ghosh at Deoghar and worked in Barin's bomb factory there. At Serampore, Brahmabandhab Upadhyay was attracted by Mokhoda's learning and his ideas on politics, while accepting him as disciple to run the 'Brahmacharya Ashram'. One of Barin's cousins, the famous journalist Hemendraprasad Ghosh, wrote that Mokhoda had a room also at the 'Field and Academy' founded by Upadhyay, by the side of the Kolkata Anushilan Samiti : here he knew eminent future citizens like Benoykumar Sarkar and Radhakumud Mukherjee. Mokhoda arranged and shared his room with Naren Bhattacharya and Harikumar, before they found shelter at the Anushilan building itself, at 49 Cornwallis Street, while Naren's cousin Abi Bhattacharya with Barin and some other like-minded friends were moving to a centre of their own.

== Political outrages ==
Mokhoda was naturally in close touch with all that was advanced in Indian politics and at the 'Academy and Art Club', which was financed by Subodh Mullick, he met all the leaders of the new movement. He took a post of Sanskrit at the National College on a small salary and became Sri Aurobindo's colleague. Denham believed that it was Mokhoda who incited the strike on the East Indian Railway between Howrah and Andal. While being prosecuted for sedition, Brahmabandhav Upadhyay died in jail in October 1907. Mokhoda became the real master and the director of Upadhyay's sarcastically anti-British journal Sandhya and the band of young men attached to it. At this juncture, Suranath is reported to have formed a central committee at the Sandhya office with the help of his disciple Jatin Banerjee alias Niralamba Swami (who had returned from Upper India, to succeed Upadhyay as editor) and Kartik Datta; Mokhada, Shamsundar Chakravarti, Sri Aurobindo, Tarakshepa, Annada Kaviraj and some others as members, they all seemed to share Upadhyay's political principles. (Terrorism V, p150). While on 6 December 1907, Barin's men attempted to wreck with explosives the Lieutenant-Governor's special train at Naraingarh, on the same evening, arranged by Mokhoda, Naren Bhattacharya alias M.N. Roy, Bhushan Mitra alias Gulay and Sailen Basu committed a hold-up at Chingripota Railway Station, and were arrested. Jatindra Mukherjee appointed his friend, Barrister J.N. Roy, to defend them. They got discharged.

Earlier, in 1907, Indra Nandi sent members of Atmonnati Samiti, including Pabitra Datta and Chuni Mitra, to found at Benares the 'Matri Sebak Samiti'. "This is distinctly suspicious," mentions the Police report. Associating with the Yugantar and the Sandhya gangs, in May 1908, a few days before Khudiram and Prafulla Chaki started for Muzaffarpur, Suranath returned from Kolkata to establish a local branch of the Anushilan in Benares, with the help of, Sudhangshu Mitra, Sachin Sanyal, a student in the entrance class of the Bengalitola High School, and his "Tantrik disciple" Debnarayan Mukherjee. Sachin kept "himself all along in the back ground and printed and circulated widely at Benares a seditious pamphlet on the occasion of the anniversary of Maharaja Pratapaditya at the instance of the Bengali anarchists, in order to instigate the youths of Benares," noted Denham. "Suranath induced Jatin Banerjee and Mokhoda to come over to Benares during the Puja holidays." Mokhoda advised the members of the party as to their future course of conduct. "Mokhada and a few other unknown men are trying to unite the extremists and the nationalists into one common bond of partisanship," wrote Denham. "A plan is also under consideration to get the Mussalmans of Turkey and Persia to prejudice the illiterate Muhammadan mass of this country against the English and to send two or three clever English-educated Bengalis to Kabul in the guise of Mussalman fakirs after making them versed in the Koran, and also to bring up after some time Arabindo Ghose (or Sri Aurobindo) either to Benares or to some other place for a secret consultation between him and Suranath.".

Raja Sasisekhareswar of Tahirpur, the principal man in the 'Bharat Dharma Mahamandal', had been fully converted to Suranath's and Mokhada's creed. Through his father, Somanath Bhaduri, Private Secretary to Maharaja of Darbhanga, the General president of the 'Mahamandal', Suranath was trying to influence the Prince. He tried it also through Amarendra Chatterjee, whose father-in-law, Preonath Banerjee, was the Maharaja's General manager. (Terrorism, Vol.V, pp 117–119).

Shortly before the Maniktola arrests in May 1908, there was a split in the Yugantar, following Barin's concentration on applied terrorism, leaving the theoretical preparation to others: (a) under Sri Aurobindo's guidance, Abi Bhattacharya took over the defunct Navashakti; (b) under Abi Chakravarti's influence, Nikhileshwar Ray Maulik controlled the Yugantar, shifting its office to 68 Maniktola Street, where Nikhileswar and Kartik Datta lived. Jatindranath Mukherjee served as a link between these different trends. After the arrests, the Yugantar articles under his direct influence became even more violent, causing several prosecutions, before collapsing in June 1908. Police Records show how eager Acharya Prafulla Chandra Ray was to distribute the Yugantar, and informed the editor that Jatindranath Mukherjee knew him personally.

In June 1908, less than two months after the arrest of the Maniktola conspirators, a "new gang" – symbol of a new spirit – commenced operations on the Eastern Bengal State Railway. The series of outrages began with a bomb thrown into a train. The Police experts held that the bombs used in these occasions were inferior to those prepared by Barin Ghosh's party; instead of dynamite or picric acid, these were coconut shell bombs with a mixture of sulphide of arsenic and chlorate of potash stuffed with bits of broken glass, nails, pins of jute combs, causing great injury on explosion. These outrages continued sporadically till April 1909. The Special Department of the Police traced them to a gang of Brahmans in Bhatpara, led by Kartik Datta and Naren Bhattacharya alias M.N. Roy, advised by Mokhoda. On 4 March 1907, Kartik had distinguished himself by leading the attempt to murder the missionary in Nadia. He and Mokhoda took part in the dacoities, reported F.C. Daly "to raise funds for political purposes (…), defence of persons under trial in political cases". Six persons were put on trial before the Special Tribunal of the High Court. Mokhoda was one of them. The jury found him not guilty: he was acquitted for the second time. "A most dangerous character. He is still maintaining his connection with the most desperate ruffians of the revolutionary party (…) Sub-Editor of the Nayak ('The Leader'), at present the most frankly seditious newspaper in Kolkata."

When Nikhileswar was arrested on 23 June 1908, it was Kartik's turn to assume control of the party in charge of the Jugantar, with the printing press at 28 Shampukur Street. There was a house in Chetla for their secret meetings. Kartik was joined by Keshab De, who was just released after two years of Rigorous Imprisonment for having thrown vitriol during East India Railway strike in 1906. As a direct descendant of the old Jugantar group, Mokhoda became their advisor. Several outrages were committed from Chetla, including the Bajitpur robbery (15 August 1908). Important among the participants were Noren Basu, Noren Chatterji, Bepin Ganguli, Annada Kaviraj, Suresh Mitra, Indra Nandi, Jatin Ray. One of the older organisers of revolutionary work, Bhupati Charan Bose (b 1864), son of Uma Charan Bose of Kolkata, was another associate of Kartik Datta and Mokhoda. He was a "well-to-do broker for the German firm of Norlinger & Co" in Kolkata. Kartik moved his headquarters to Telinipara, near Chandernagore, before proceeding to the Bighati dacoity on 16 September 1908. At Bighati in Hooghly, noted Denham, a rich man opposed to swadeshi was robbed. Immediate arrest of Kartik, Suresh Majumdar, Basanta, Pannalal Chakrabarti and Dhiren Ghosh, followed by the arrest of Mokhada, Suresh Mitra and Pannalal Chatterji (turned approver). Keshab absconded with the booty. Mokhoda Pandit had in his possession some part of the ornaments stolen at Bajitpur in Mymensingh; certain jewellery he gave to sell to a goldsmith tallied in weight and description with a portion of the property stolen. Other participants were : Biren Mallik, Manmohan Barman, and Beharilal Ray. The Police recognised Mokhoda, once more, as "the guru of the band, a recruiting agent, active participant in the dacoity."

== The Yugantar Split ==
On the breakup of the Yugantar, Mokhoda had joined Kartik, and had helped in giving advice and shelter to revolutionaries, as well as in obtaining arms and disposing of stolen property. In spite of several charges, they were unanimously acquitted. Resulting from the Bighati case, there was a fusion with Jogen Tagore's Bhatpara group, with Naren Bhattacharya, "a notable personage", intimate with Mokhoda. Nixon mentioned seven major outrages between 22 June 1908 and 15 April 1909, committed by this group. At this stage, the Police found the Province divided up as follows:

1) Kolkata : led by Indra Nandi; 2) 24 Parganas, Howrah, Hooghly: Nanigopal Sengupta; 3) Rajshahi, Nadia, Jessore, Hooghly: Jatindra Mukherjee; 4) Natore, Dighapatiya, Amalpur: Satish Sarkar; 5) Mymensingh, Dinajpur, Rangpur, Jamalpur, Cooch Behar: Amaresh Kanjilal; 6) Berhampur, Murshidabad : Suren Chakravarti.

Nanigopal and Jatindra had originally been members of the Kolkata Anushilan Samiti and acted directly under Sri Aurobindo's guidance, maintaining a constant collaboration. After quarrelling with Satish Basu, Nanigopal absorbed most of the members of Mokhoda-cum-Kartik's dispersed group, since the latter's arrest. Amaresh and Satish Sarkar worked under Jatindranath Mukherjee. Belonging to Indra's group (Atmonnati), Bepin Ganguli, Noren Bose and Noren Chatterji, too remained close to Jatindra's policy. These revolutionaries committed sixteen outrages between March 1908 and October 1909. Denham noted in 1909 on the 'Sarathi Jubak Mandali': "perhaps second only in importance to the Anushilan Samiti for the number of persons included in its ranks who actually took part in crimes of violence".

Their spiritual guide was Tarakshepa alias Tarapado Banerji, a "mysterious Sadhu, who wandered about Bengal, being most frequently heard of in the districts of Birbhum, Nadia or in Kolkata". He was disciple of Bamakhepa of Tarapur in Birbhum, "having possessed hypnotic power"; Nanigopal Sengupta was his disciple. He frequented Jogendranath Tagore, "an undesirable member of the Tagore family": his "influence with the revolutionary party is still considerable"; he was a link "between the parties who work in Bengal proper and the Eastern Bengal and Assam dacoity gangs." Denham knew that Kartik's arrest was rather a shock to the members of this group.

Kartik was acquitted, to be charged again with harbouring four of the revolutionary 'bandits', but acquitted by a Howrah jury. He was released on 27 December 1909, after having served a term of Rigorous Imprisonment in connection with the assault committed on Higginbothams as well as with the dacoities at Bajitpur and Bighati : leaders of the Nadia units – Jatindranath Mukherjee and his uncle, the pleader Lalitkumar Chatterjee of Krishnagar-received him with a hero's ovation, as recorded by the approver Lalit Chakravarti nicknamed Benga.

On 30 March 1910, Benga confessed that even before the Netra outrage, he had spent one day at Nanigopal's, before Suresh Majumdar alias Paran took him to a pleader of the Kolkata High Court. He spent there two or three days. The "Nimai chogra" took him by night train to Krishnagar. Nimai or Nirmalkumar was the son of the government pleader Basantakumar Chatterjee, Jatindra Mukherjee's uncle. He left Benga with the pleader Lalit Chatterjee's mohurrir (clerk), Nibaran Chakravarti alias Karuda : the latter had bedding and food ready for Benga. Bholadanga zamindar's son Manmatha Biswas was "of our society". After a few days, he returned to Kolkata.

On 24 January 1910, the assassination of Shamsul Alam led the Viceroy Minto to admit the efficient spirit of the new 'Yugantar' under the over-all leadership of Jatindranath Mukherjee: "A spirit hitherto unknown to India has come into existence (...), a spirit of anarchy and lawlessness which seeks to subvert not only British rule but the Governments of Indian Chiefs...". Minto's successor, Lord Hardinge regretted in a letter, in the slippery context of the Howrah Gang Case : "In fact, nothing could be worse, in my opinion, than the condition of Bengal and Eastern Bengal. There is practically no Government in either province, but I am determined to restore order.".

In the meantime, Mokhoda had gone back to Dhaka in February 1910. In March 1910 an attempt was made to assassinate G.C. Denham of the Criminal Investigation Department and a very prominent figure of the Alipore conspiracy (1908–1909). At the same time, a "Strictly Confidential" note (p. 184), added to Denham's report, mentioned that connection was established between Suranath and Amarendra Chatterjee, editor of the Bengali Karmayogin and esteemed associate of Sri Aurobindo and Jatindranath Mukherjee; the mess at 133 Lower Circular Road of Kolkata, served Amarendra and Makhanlal Sen for "seeing and conferring with the notorious [sic!] Jatindra Mukherjee".

Amarendra's paper was almost a Bengali version of Sri Aurobindo's Karmayogin in English; it had also a Hindi edition published from Benares. It was Amarendra who sent Basanta Biswas to Benares, to assist Rasbehari Bose. "In or about this same year (1910) Gyanananda Swami (Jogeshwar Mukherjee), a great friend of Mokhoda, who was for sometime secretary of the Bharat Dharma Mahamandal ('All India Great Federation of Religion'), the headquarters of which are at Benares, was in correspondence with Amarendranath Chatterjee in Bengal.". Finding Bengal too hot to hold him, Jatindra's associate Kiran Mukherjee visited Mokhoda at Benares in 1911, and stayed with Sarada Maitra of Rangpur. Mokhoda returned to Kolkata, in 1911: in February, the revolutionaries shot dead Srish Chakravarti, the head constable of Kolkata Police, who was a former member of the Yugantar gang, turned informer. According to F.C. Daly:

"It is a singular coincidence, if it is only a coincidence, that this murder took place on the evening of the day on which Jatindranath Mukherjee (…) was set free from the dock at the High Court (…) It is likely that Jatin's release put fresh heart into the people who had been contemplating further outrages but hesitating to act".

Mokhoda was strongly suspected in this connection. Descendant of Mokhoda's Bhatpara group, the Baranagar group reunited a series of small samitis (e.g. the 'Jubak Samiti' with its clubs and poor fund) in the north of Kolkata and in Howrah on the other side of the river Hooghly and operated since 1907; they had contacts with Jogen Tagore, Mokhoda and the Ramakrishna Mission.

Again, in December 1911, Mokhoda was seen in Benares and, in the same month, an Inspector of Police was shot dead: the man was "in possession of information regarding a dangerous organiser of political dacoities named Pandit Mokhoda Charan Samadhyaya." E.H. Corbet, Superintendent of Police, noted that Mokhoda:

"was a bosom friend of the police Bengali informer. The matter was referred to Government and I was sent to Benares to interview the Commissioner and Magistrate, with the result that he was arrested (…) A strong and elaborate case under Section 110(f), Criminal Procedure Code".

Mokhoda was to have a conviction for three years; but it was decided after the Durbar (Coronation ceremony) to drop the proceeding. Mokhada was warned not to come back to Benares again.

Jatindra Mukherjee and Rash Behari Bose, however, visited Benares in May 1912 and associated with Sachin Sanyal, Mokhoda and Suranath. Soon, Sachin became the sole leader there. Vinayak Rao Kaple was one of its members. Sarada Maitra of Rangpur and Satish Mukherjee of Barisal frequently visited Benares; the latter associated with Mokhoda the members of the Sevak Samiti.

During 1913, Jogen Tagore led a series of dacoities; in 1915 he got contact with Bipin Ganguli's followers including Probhas De and Harish Sikdar, and came to know members of other groups including Atulkrishna Ghosh and Ananta Haldar, (all of them acting under Jatindra Mukherjee). Bipin was sentenced to five years Rigorous Imprisonment on 2 August 1915 in the Agarpara Dacoity Case.

== Epilogue ==
Two years later, Mokhoda was prosecuted at Benares in a so-called Insurance fraud case; he was convicted in February 1914, and sentenced to three years' imprisonment.

No subsequent information about this firebrand scholar is available.

== Notes ==
The following are notes about Mokhoda Samadhyayi:
