= Shashibhushan Raychaudhury =

Shashibhushan Raychaudhuri শশীভূষণ রায়চৌধুরী
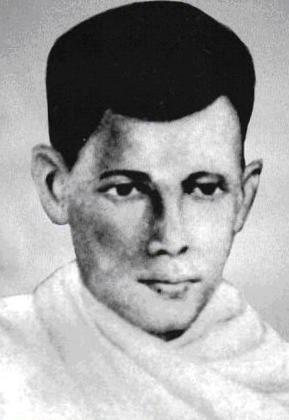
- Shashibhushan Raychaudhuri
- Born: 8 January 1863; Tegharia, Calcutta, 24 Parganas, Bengal, British India
- Died: 1922; Tegharia, Calcutta24 Parganas, Bengal, British India
- Occupation: Revolutionary

Shashibhushan Raychaudhuri (Bengali: শশীভূষণ রায়চৌধুরী) (8 January 1863 – 1922), also known as Shashida, was a patriotic educationist connected with the radical revolutionary activities that had their origins in Bengal. He was the pioneer in what came to be known as the night-school movement, for building up a self-reliant society.

== Early life ==
Shashida was born on 8 January 1863 at the village Tegharia near Barrackpore in present West Bengal. He was the youngest son of Saudamini Devi and Anandachandra, who owned some land and belonged to an old respectable family. As a student at Sodepur high school, Shashida opened a traditional primary school of the Pathshala style, to give secular education to children of indigent families, usually looked after by zealous Christian preachers. In course of time, Shashida created also evening classes for adults and, in addition to rudiments of Bengali, history and mathematics, he invited competent collaborators to initiate them to weaving, agriculture including growing silk-worms, and cottage industry. In 1880, Shashida passed his Entrance examination and was admitted at the Metropolitan Institution of Kolkata, haloed by the presence of Ishwarchandra Vidyasagar as one of its directors and of Rashtraguru Surendranath Banerjea and Khudiram Bose (not the martyr) as its faculty. Rashtraguru had instructed Yogendra Vidyabhushan to popularise the lives of Mazzini and Garibaldi and had a nationwide reputation as orator. Khudiram Bose was a disciple of the famous Young Bengal leader, Reverend Kalicharan Banerjee, and knew Keshub Chunder Sen intimately. There was an active physical education course in the college, supervised by Chandidas Ghosh. In no time Shashida caught the sparks of a nascent patriotic activism and, with Anandamohan Basu, formed the Students' Association, which had contacts with Deshabandhu Chittaranjan Das, Pramathanath Mitra also known as Barrister P. Mitter and Brahmabandhab Upadhyay. He was a regular visitor to the gymnasium attached to the General Assembly's Institution (later Scottish Church College) and the Gohas' club. For traditional self-defence, he met Swami Vivekananda who practised wrestling with the Gohas. The Swami's philosophy of man-making consolidated Shashida's own plans of action. Here, probably thanks to Vivekananda, he discovered Jatindranath Mukherjee, too, the future Bagha Jatin.

== Revolutionary organisation ==
In 1900, P. Mitter asked Shashida to send him some young men of character. It was the moment when Mitter was busy founding the Kolkata Anushilan Samiti and knew Shashida's popularity among the college students. Shashida sent him Satish Mukherjee, Nibaran Bhattacharya, Indranath Nandi, Nikhileshvar Ray Maulik. And he personally introduced Jatindranath Mukherjee alias Bagha Jatin, who had already known Mitter during a meeting around Kakuzo Okakura at Surendranath Tagore's house. Meanwhile, invited by Brahmabandhav, on 6 January 1902, Shashida joined the first batch of teachers at the new boarding school established by Rabindranath Tagore at Santiniketan, along with Jagadananda Ray, Revachand Makhijani, Shivadhan Vidyarnav, Subodhchandra Majumdar and Manoranjan Banerjee. In March 1902, Shashida had to return to Kolkata for the inauguration of the Anushilan Samiti. Soon, with the coming of Jatin Banerjee alias Niralamba, Mitter was under the impression that the organisation was taking too much of a military turn, while Banerjee disagreed with Barin Ghose's untimely terrorist enterprise. In the midst of this tension, Shashida and Bagha Jatin served as mediators. Coming from Baroda, in 1903, Sri Aurobindo at Yogendra Vidyabhushan's place, tried to settle the disputes, and discussed with Bagha Jatin and Banerjee his programme for Bengal. Very soon, Banerjee chose to set out for Upper India, where he continued his work as a revolutionary missionary. The Anushilan Samiti, under Shashida's guidance, opened in Kolkata the Shramajivi Vidyalay or "Working Men's Institution" where evening classes attracted people who had no means to be educated. Many poor students, too, received there supplementary coaching in various subjects. The Samiti also recruited volunteers for social services such as nursing the sick; cremating; sell handmade soaps, padlocks from Shashida's village and cottage industry products, on a cooperative basis; organise significant public functions as the Shivaji, Pratapaditya and Sitaram festivals. This was the prototype of the well-known Chatra-bhandar or "Students' Store" and, later, of the Shramajivi Samavaya run by Amarendranath Chatterjee and other associates of Bagha Jatin. Probably as the party's emissary, Shashida went to Mungheyr in Bihar towards the end of 1904 and, encouraged by Nimdhari Singh and other regional leaders, he opened a model school. Then, in 1905, he went to Orissa, and inspired Utkalamani Gopabandhu Das to start a physical culture centre at Bhubaneswar, in collaboration with Nilakantha Das, Krupasindhu Misra, Acharya Harihar Das and Godavarish Misra. This was the beginning of the Satyavadi Vidyalaya, founded near Puri in 1909. Alerted by Shashida about the terrible flood in Orissa, in 1908, P. Mitter sent a relief delegation headed by Naren Bhattacharya alias M.N. Roy and Harikumar Chakravarti, two direct recruits of the restless Vedic scholar and radical leader Mokshada Charan Samadhyai.

== Daulatpur College ==
With the Alipore Bomb Case, when associations were officially banned by repressive laws, Bagha Jatin and other leaders of the Anushilan Samiti started the Bengal Youngmen's Zamindari Co-operative Society in the Sundarban area: "the idea was to place revolutionary young men in the rural agricultural sector (...), organising small-scale cottage industries and swadeshi stores...," remembers Arun Chandra Guha. Others went to Shashida's village. In 1909, Shashida was to leave for Dehra Dun as a private tutor at the house of Prafullanath Tagore; on learning that Rasbehari Bose was suspected by the police of involvement in the bomb making, Shashida arranged to send Bose to Dehra Dun for safety. He himself went to Daulatpur College as the superintendent of its hostel. He shared his room with Manindranath Seth, the vice-principal and member of the secret society, and Bhupendra Kumar Datta, a brilliant student leader : all the three were to be arrested in 1917. Every morning and evening, after some physical culture, the students assembled for meditating, accompanied by select readings, and devotional and patriotic songs conducted by Shashida. Since 1911, drawn by Shashida and the promising students he had been training, Bagha Jatin visited the campus, while touring these districts regularly. Advised by the latter, the students took to intensive riding, rowing and military drills. In 1913, Shashida formed a volunteers' corps to assist Jatin in the Damodar flood relief. Shattered by the sudden martyrdom of Bagha Jatin in 1915, in the teeth of massive arrests under the Defence of India Act, Shashida with his students concentrated on social work, while helping the stray revolutionaries to reorganise the party. He was arrested in 1917. Judging from the state of this TB patient, the Government decided to home intern him with his wife Urmila Devi, his daughters Rani and Durga, and son Ashok, first in Daulatpur, then in Khulna. Released in 1919, Shashida returned to Tegharia to improve the status of his school and to campaign against malaria. In spite of his poor health, he maintained his social activities till his death in April 1922.
