= Atulkrishna Ghosh =

Indian revolutionary (1890–1966)

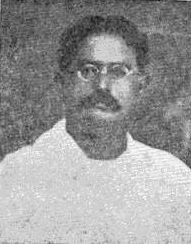
- Born: 1890; Jaduboyra-Etmampur, Nadia, Bengal, British India (present-day in Kushtia, Bangladesh)
- Died: 4 May 1966 (aged 75–76); Kolkata, West Bengal, India

Atulkrishna Ghosh (Bengali: অতুলকৃষ্ণ ঘোষ; 1890 – 4 May 1966) was an Indian revolutionary, member of the Anushilan Samiti, and a leader of the Jugantar movement involved in Hindu German Conspiracy during World War I.

== Early life ==
Atul was born in 1890, in a Bengali Hindu middle-class Kayastha family of the village Jaduboyra-Etmampur in Kushtia Sub-division, which was then in Nadia district, now in Bangladesh. His parents were Taresh Chandra and Binodini Devi. The couple had six children. The eldest, Meghamala was married to the famous Professor of Algebra, K.P. Basu, both connected with the revolutionary movement. Their son Jitendranath Basu, along with Atul and his youngest brother Amar, was blacklisted, too, for participation in seditious activities. After his primary classes at Kumarkhali, Atul passed brilliantly his Matriculation in 1909 from the Kolkata Hindu School, to join the Scottish Churches College for Intermediate, and the Krishnath College at Berhampur for B.Sc. While preparing for his final M.Sc. examination at Presidency College, Kolkata, Atul had to interrupt his studies for his political commitment. The college and its hostel were humming with his radical associates, all future celebrities mostly in scientific research, like Satyendra Nath Bose, Megh Nad Saha, Jnan Ghosh, Jnan Mukherjee, Sishir Mitra, Sushil Acharya, Sailen Ghosh, Harish Simha, Jatin Sheth, Hiralal Ray.

== Political background ==
Since 1906, with his cousin Nolinikanta Kar, Atul had been frequenting Jatindranath Mukherjee (Bagha Jatin) who was their neighbour in Kushtia Sub-division. They both entered the local Anushilan Samiti. W. Sealy in his Report will note "Atul Ghosh and Nolini Kanta Kar, two dangerous and important absconders of the gun-running conspiracy." (p23). At Kolkata, thanks to Jatin, they both came very close to Sri Aurobindo. Whereas Nolini practised wrestling with Kikkar Singh, Atul became an expert trainer in self-defence at the Pataldanga branch of the Anushilan Samiti: Atul Krishna Ghosh & Jatindranath Mukherjee founded PATHURIAGHATA BYAM SAMITY which was an important centre of armed revolution of Indian national movement. He came across a number of revolutionaries, including Sachin Sanyal’s Benares group and Biren Datta Gupta whom he recommended to Jatindranath. Biren received from the latter, in January 1910, the mandate to assassinate Samsul Alam, Deputy Superintendent of Police, who was man-handling the under-trial prisoners of the Alipore Bomb case. In connection with Biren’s successful mission, Jatindranath with forty-six associates were placed on trial in the Howrah conspiracy case. Inside the prison, Jatindranath learnt from his emissaries abroad that Germany was preparing for war against Great Britain. After his release in 1911, Jatindranath suspended all extremist activities, left Kolkata under the responsibility of Atul, himself forging a grand federation of regional units in the districts. A relentless organiser, Atul sheltered revolutionaries from various units as much in his parents’ house at Jaduboyra, as at the Kolkata residence of Meghamala and K.P. Basu, at 11 Mahendra Gossain's Lane, where there was a free dormitory with homely meals. Even leaders of rival parties like Pratul Ganguli of Dhaka admit having enjoyed this hospitality, at great expense and risk on Atul's side: "We became great friends with Atulkrishna and had confidence in him. I have very often been to his Darjipara residence and spent nights there. He had grown intimate with several of our members, almost close friends. We considered him to be, somewhat, our own colleague and he sincerely hoped to unite our parties so that we could all work together. Frankly speaking, it was thanks to his wish that I met Jatin Mukherjee…". Disappointed by the duplicity of the Dhaka branch, "some of its important workers, however, like Sachin Sanyal and Nagen (Girija) Datta, severed their connection with it and, introduced by Atulkrishna, worked with Rasbehari Bose in Upper India." Atul's elder brother Aghorenath, a civil surgeon, often looked after the bullet wounds received by the patriots.

== Jatin Mukherjee's right-hand man ==
According to Nixon's Report, probably in about 1913, or perhaps a little before, certain of the old members of the Kolkata Anushilan Samiti who, in the meantime, had been members of various athletic clubs, formed themselves into a branch of the Seva Samiti under Atulkrishna Ghosh: "The ostensible object of this samiti was a benevolent one. The first centre was at the house of Atul Ghosh. During the Burdwan floods, in 1913, many members of this samiti went there for the purpose of affording relief to the afflicted people.". Atul's efficiency and generosity as a leader became evident during this relief.

Nixon further informs that the headquarters of the samiti were later shifted to the house of Jibantara Haldar, and later still to No. 83 Hari Ghosh's Street. "Of this organisation Amar Ghosh, the brother of Atul, was an important figure," mentioned Nixon. "It was this samiti which formed the nucleus of the combined party which operated in Bengal in 1915. Purna Das of Madaripur brought some of his more audacious spirits along to it and later Pulin Mukherji alias Thakur, previously a member of the Dacca Anushilan Samiti, joined it and took a prominent part in the commission of outrages. Other members of the Dacca Anushilan Samiti severed their connection with that society and joined the party of Atul Ghosh. Bipin Behari Ganguli was in close connection with it and also the members of the Northern Bengal party. Jatindranath Mukherjee seems to have been in touch with the members of this samiti from the time of its formation, and immediately he came into Calcutta, the Seva Samiti acknowledged his leadership and became the real West Bengal party of 1915.". During the Alipore Bomb prosecutions, though Rasbehari Bose had settled in North India with the help of Shashibhushan Raychaudhury, he maintained his contact with Bengal through Atul. Amarendra Chatterjee and Atul supplied him bombs for actions in up-country and, even, the one thrown on Viceroy Hardinge. Informed by Atul, Rasbehari could participate in the flood relief and the significant meetings of leaders. It was Atul, again, in September 1914, who was contacted by Gurudit Singh and other Komagata Maru patriots, coming from Vancouver with recommendation from Taraknath Das : he and Satish Chakravarti arranged with various regional units of the Jugantar to shelter them, before sending them to destinations in North India, fixed by Rasbehari. Furious to hear about the death of a jute-mill worker at Jagaddal, caused by the kick from a booted leg of an English supervisor, Atul was desperately looking for arms to avenge this atrocity.

== In need of arms ==
"The outbreak of war revivified the vague ideas of revolution which had been floating about in the mind of young Bengal for the last ten years and the hopes of those who had throughout been waiting for the opportunity, and the possibility of a successful revolt seemed imminent," wrote Nixon. "It was probably some time in September 1914 that Jatin Mukherjee came to Calcutta in order to take such steps as England’s participation in a war with Germany seemed to call for in this direction.". Judging the time ripe for them to make full preparations for a revolution, Jatin's men undertook taxi-cab robberies to provide funds for this purpose, as described in the Rowlatt Report. Hence, on 26 August 1914, Shrish Chandra Mitra (Habu), one of his loyal associates, smuggled fifty Mauser pistols and forty-six thousand cartridges from the Rodda (arms dealers) in Kolkata, handed them over to Atul, before disappearing for good. Jatin Mukherjee distributed these dreadful arms to various units. Conceived by Jatin, as does a skilful stage manager, Atul chalked out a series of daring overt acts under the immediate leadership of Naren Bhattacharya alias M.N. Roy: these are all duly catalogued in the Rowlatt Report. Successive emissaries returned from Europe and America with the good news of the arrival of arms obtained from German authorities by the Berlin Committee. Balasore was chosen by Germany to land a shipment. Jatin with a handful of associates took shelter there. Then Atul dispatched Harikumar Chakravarti, Dr Jatin Ghoshal, Satish Chakravarti and a batch of workers with boats, rifles and other requisites to the other selected port at Raymangal in the Sundarbans. When information came that the Police had discovered Jatin's hideout in Balasore, Naren Ghose Chaudhury proposed spontaneously to rush to the spot for a showdown; Jadugopal Mukherjee objected: "Dada is big enough to look after himself. Let us disperse." Atul was stunned by this cynical order. After the failure of the Indo-German conspiracy and after Jatin's untimely death, disheartened Atul and other Jugantar leaders went underground in 1915, remaining so for about seven years. Even then, for several years, the revolutionaries entertained the hope of smuggling arms for an insurrection. In June 1916, Atul sent through Ananta Haldar a letter for Bhavabhushan Mitra at Deoghar, "who was one of the trusted men of the party. Both Ananta and Bhava Bhushan were dealt with under the Defence Rules and interned in Bengal." (Sealy, p24). In the teeth of sporadic police attempts to arrest them, once, in Chandernagore, while nursing Charu Ghose, Atul with the ailing co-worker on his shoulders, scaled the hospital wall. Dr Govindin, the Civil Surgeon, narrated this to Bhupendrakumar Datta. According to Nixon: "Jatin Mukherjee had at this time gone to Balasore, and Atul Ghosh was a big figure in the arrangement for these outrages." In July 1916, "Atul Ghosh was still the prompting spirit of all these gangs, and in the Barisal party, too, he seems to have wielded some influence.".

== The last phase ==
After the end of the War, Surendranath Banerjee, followed by Barin Ghose and Motilal Roy, successfully negotiated the withdrawal of warrants against the fugitives accused of the Indo-German plot. Atul was adamant in obtaining a promise on these points : (a) there would be no question of surrendering arms; (b) no questions would be raised on their past activities; (c) no parole would be demanded concerning their future conducts. Atul came out in 1921. But his Dada's (Jatin Mukherjee's) heroic death, "had knocked out his revolutionary ardour and he gave up active politics." Yet, in January 1924, when Gopinath Saha killed an Englishman, mistaking him to be Tegart, the much-hated Commissioner of Kolkata Police (reputed to have shot Jatin Mukherjee dead), Atul was made a state-prisoner, to be released in 1926. The same year he married Menokarani Rakshit of Majilpur and took to business, dissociating himself completely from politics. They had no issues. In an interview with Prithwindra Mukherjee (Bagha Jatin's grandson), on 27 October 1963 - shortly before his death -, Atul sighed: "Dada was a magnet; we all, iron scraps, received our energy from him. When he was no more, we all became iron scraps. I still do not know whether my first allegiance went to Dada, or to the Motherland." Asked about the source of Jatindranath's tremendous force, Atul replied: "He was a very well trained wrestler and an all-round sportsman. But what characterised him was his soul force and his power of concentration. He could pin-point all his energy to a single part of his body, for instance his fist. A single blow from that fist was equivalent to an electric charge of God knows how many volts!"

Atul died peacefully in his Kolkata residence, on 4 May 1966.

== A tribute ==
Bhupendrakumar Datta, his young associate, recalled: "Instinctively liberal in idea, Atulkrishna hated caste and religious distinction. Democracy in the political sphere and justice in the social sphere were what he cherished most. During the last years he turned to spiritual life."

== Bibliography ==
- Biplabi atulkrishna ghosh, by Bhupendrakumar Datta, Shri Sarasvati Library, Kolkata, 1966 (abbr. BKD)
- "Ghosh, Atulkrishna (1890–1966)" by Bhupendrakumar Datta in Dictionary of National Biography, (ed.) S.P. Sen, Vol. II, 1973, pp37–38 (abbr. DNB)
- J. C. Nixon's Report "On Revolutionary Organisation" in Terrorism in Bengal, ed. by Amiya K. Samanta, Vol II, 1995 (abbr. Nixon).
- W. Sealy's Report, "Connections with Bihar and Orissa" in Terrorism in Bengal, ed. by Amiya K. Samanta, Vol V, 1995 (abbr. Sealy).
- Sadhak biplabi jatindranath, by Prithwindra Mukherjee, West Bengal State Book Board, 1990
- Biplabir jiban-darshan, autobiography, by Pratulchandra Ganguli, 1976
- Amader Badi, Reminiscences, Chhanda Sen, Published by Jayanta Basu, Kolkata, November 2005
