= Krishnanagar A.V. High School =

School in West Bengal

Coordinates: 23.4049°N 88.4984°E

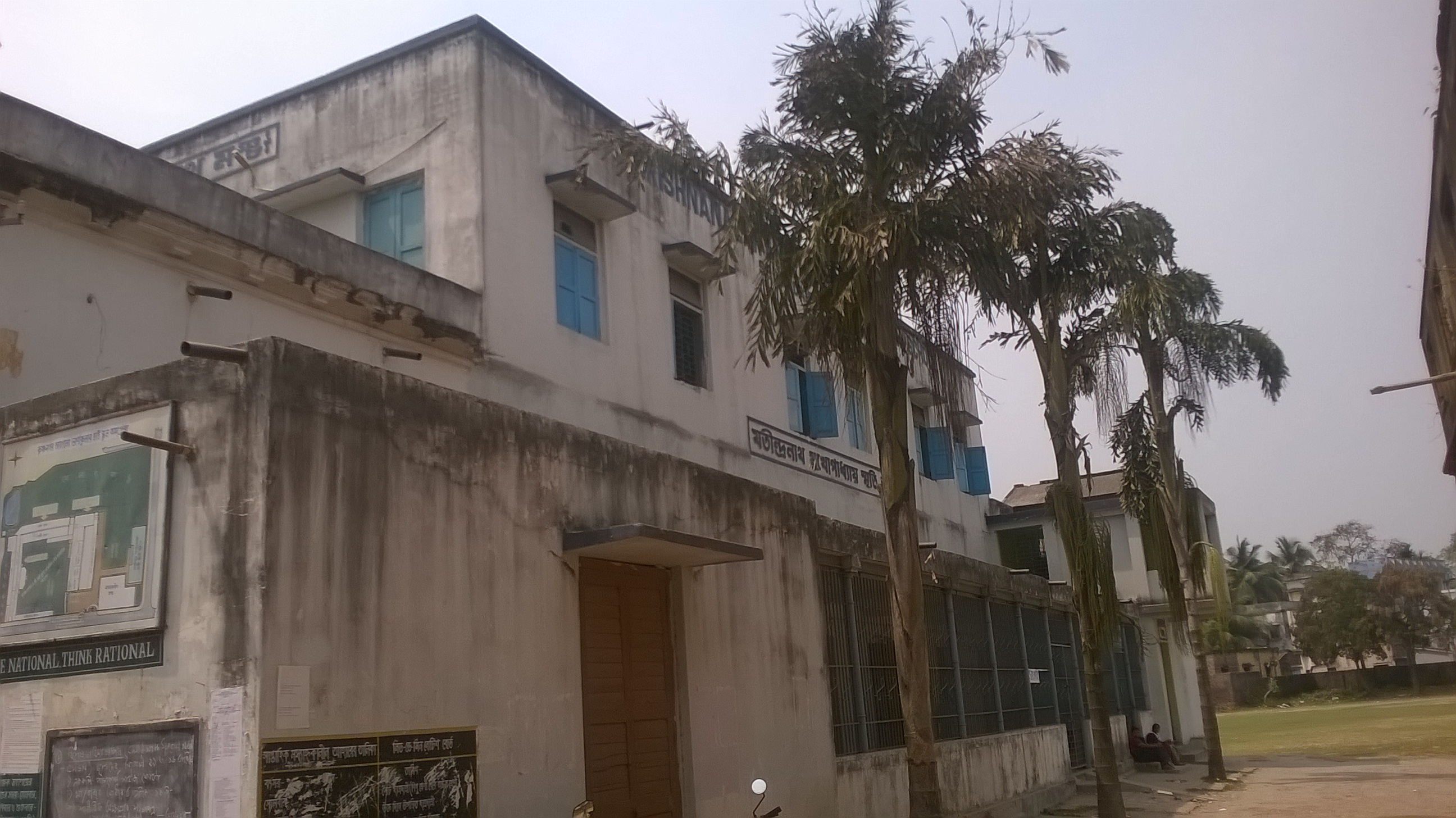
Krishnanagar Anglo-vernacular School

Krishnanagar A.V. High School or Anglo Vernacular High School is a school located at Krishnanagar in Nadia district in the Indian state of West Bengal.

== History ==
The school was founded in 1849 by Braja Nath Mukherjee, a local missionary teacher along with two scholars Umesh Chandra Dutta and Trinath Sen of Krishnanagar. Initially the institution was started as small school with only two teachers at Nediarpara. Thereafter it was converted into the status of High School.

== Notable alumni ==
- Bagha Jatin
- Gobindapada Dutta
