= Khudiram Bose Central College =

College in West Bengal

- Type: Central Undergraduate College
- Established: 1893; 133 years ago
- Founder: Principal Khudiram Bose
- Accreditation: NAAC
- Affiliations: University Grants Commission, University of Calcutta
- President: Sri Santanu Mallik
- Principal: Dr. Md. Afsar Ali
- Location: 71/2-A, Bidhan Sarani, Manicktala, Hatibagan, Shyambazar, Kolkata, West Bengal, 700006, India; 22.5905978°N 88.3689168°E
- Campus: Urban
- Website: Khudiram Bose Central College

- Location within Kolkata Location within India

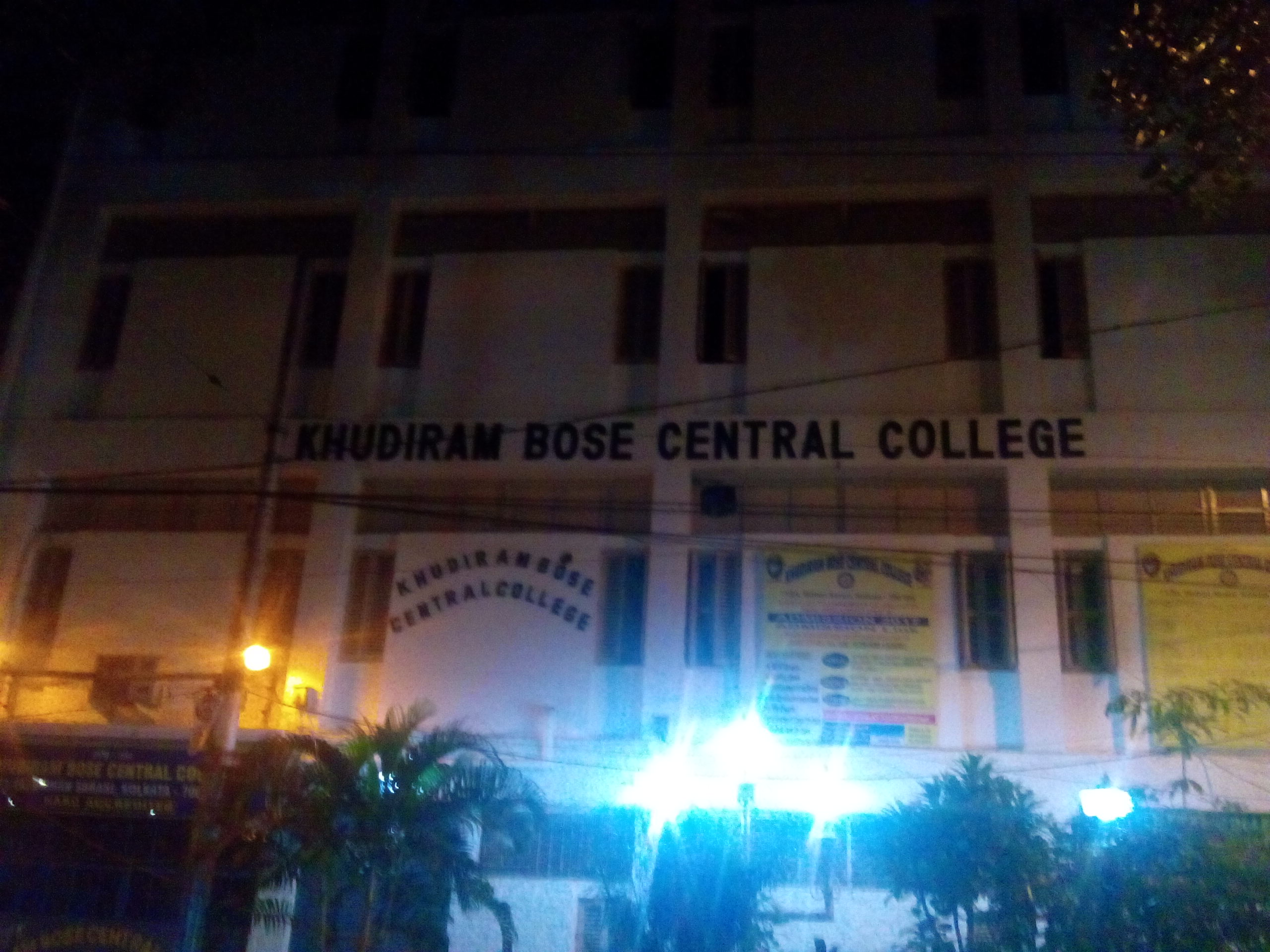
Khudiram Bose central college

Khudiram Bose Central College, established in 1893, is a central undergraduate Government aided college in Kolkata, West Bengal, India. It offers only courses in arts and commerce. It is affiliated with the University of Calcutta.The college has received University Grants Commission (India) affiliation and awarded by the National Assessment and Accreditation Council.

== Foundation ==
Khudiram Bose founded the Universal Institution (Central Institution) on 3 June 1893. Inspired by the spirit of self reliance. Khudiram Bose allowed his pupil, Acharya Prafulla Chandra Roy, to conduct "Swadeshi Exhibition" in his college. Central College was the place for freedom fighters "Bagha Jatin" (also an alumnus of the institution) and others.

== Departments ==
=== Arts and Commerce ===
- Education
- Journalism and Mass Communication
- History
- Bengali
- Geography
- Political Science
- Physical Education
- Philosophy
- Accountancy
- Economics
- Hindi
- English

== Notable alumni ==
- Bagha Jatin, Indian independence activist

== Central Library ==
College library subscribes magazines and journals like Desh, Economic Political Weekly, Competition Success Review, The Management Accountant and others for the use of teachers and students. Beside the Reading Room facility there are facilities available for the students like internet surfing, reference service, newspaper reading, access to various journals and magazines etc.

== Accreditation ==
Khudiram Bose Central College is recognized by the University Grants Commission (UGC). Recently, it has been re-accredited and awarded by the National Assessment and Accreditation Council (NAAC).

== NCC ==
Khudiram Bose Central College started N.C.C Unit (National Cadet Corps) in 2003. The N.C.C unit of this college is affiliated to 19 Bengal Battalion, Classes are held at Fort William, India.

== Magazines ==
lots of magazines for students. Different department have their own wall magazines. The names of the wall magazines are as follows:

1. EDUCATUM - Department of Education

Notable Faculty: Prof. Dalia Pramanik, Prof. Santu kar, Prof. Tanvir A Mondal

1. BANGLA BIBHAGIO PATRIKA -Department of Bengali

Notable Faculty: Dr. Subrata Kumar Mallik, Prof. Soma Paul, Prof. Sharmistha Ghosh (Sinha).

1. UTTARAN - Department of History

Notable Faculty:Prof. Anamika Nandy, Prof. Payel Nandi.

1. AGRADUT -Department of Political Science
2. DIGANTA -Department of Journalism & Mass Communication
3. SAPTAPARNI - Department of Commerce
4. ABHIVYAKTI - Department of Hindi
5. MOHANA and also CHOKHER ALOE VISION BEYOND - Department of English

== Kanyashree Prakalpa ==
Monetary grant under Kanyashree Prakalpa of the Govt. of West Bengal is offered to girl students.

== Aikyashree Prakalpo ==
West Bengal State Scholarships for Minority Students is a state government initiative.

== Innovation in classroom ==
Film Screening: New mode of teaching adopted by few departments of the college is to show films to the students relevant and based on the theme related to their course. the department of JMC prepares and shows documentary and shortfilms. The department of Political Science also organises film screening based on political relevance for their students.

== See also ==
- List of colleges affiliated to the University of Calcutta
- Education in India
- Education in West Bengal
