= Birendranath Dutta Gupta =

Indian revolutionary (1889–1910)

Biren Datta Gupta
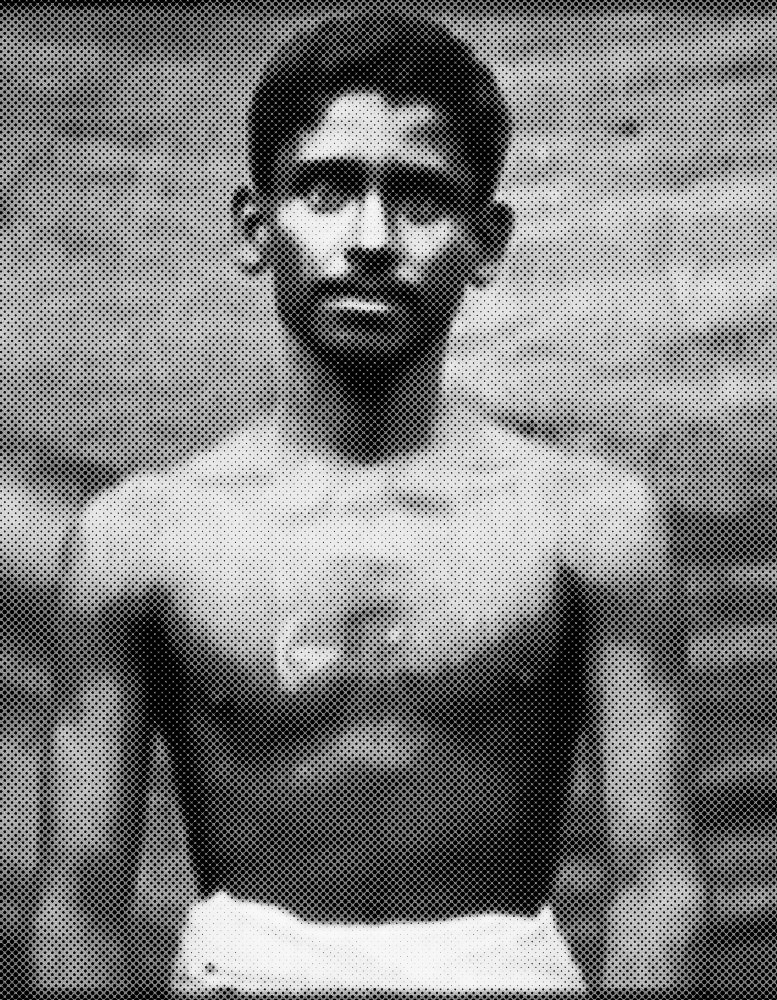
- Born: 20 June 1889; Bikrampur, Bengal Presidency, British India
- Died: 21 February 1910 (aged 20); Alipore, Bengal Presidency, British India
- Cause of death: Execution
- Other name: Birendranath Datta Gupta
- Parents: Umacharan Datta Gupta (father); Basantkumari Devi (mother)

Biren Datta Gupta (20 June 1889 — 21 February 1910) was an Indian nationalist and member of the Indian Independence movement. At an early age, he developed a keen interest in contemporary Indian politics and became actively involved in revolutionary activities. Birendranath was hanged in connection with the murder of Shamsul Alam, deputy superintendent of police, the chief investigating officer in the Alipore conspiracy case.

== Early life ==
Biren was born on 20 June 1889 in the village of Baligaon in Bikrampur, Dhaka. He was the second child of father Umacharan Gupta and mother Basantakumari Devi. He lost his father at a very young age. In 1906, Birendra was admitted in the ninth class of Jalpaiguri district school. He later came to Calcutta and was inspired by the ideology of Kanailal Dutta, the martyred revolutionary who assassinated Naren Gonsai, the witness in the Alipore conspiracy case, and became involved in active revolutionary activities. During this time he associated himself with revolutionary activities as a disciple of Jatindranath Mukherjee alias Bagha Jatin.

== Shamsul Alam's murder ==
After the Alipore conspiracy case was filed in the Calcutta High Court, the secret revolutionary activities in Bengal became almost public. At its core were three royal officials - Inspector Nandalal Banerjee, Advocate Ashutosh Biswas and the notorious, DSP Shamsul Alam. Assassinating them became necessary for the revolutionaries. Inspector Nandalal Banerjee betrayed Prafulla Chaki and shot him dead. For this he got his price, when another revolutionary Srish Pal shot him dead. Charuchandra Bose assassinated Ashutosh Biswas, the public prosecutor in the Alipore case, who was responsible for insulting the revolutionaries of the Alipore Bomb Case. The rest was Samsul Alam, the chief investigating officer in the conspiracy case. The verdict in the Alipore case was announced on 7 May 1909. The verdict Barindra Kumar Ghosh, Ullaskar Dutta including other revolutionaries was convicted and their sentence was announced. In this situation, Bagha Jatin placed the responsibility of killing Shamsul Alam on the shoulders of his dear disciple Biren Datta Gupta. On 24 February 1910, in broad daylight in the verandah of the High Court, Biren shot Samsul Alam at the Point Blank Range. He then tried to escape from the court premises by firing. Unfortunately, after his revolver ran out of ammunition, the court guards came and caught him. He did not divulge any secret information during the police interrogation. He even refused to take the help of a lawyer to defend himself during the trial in the High Court. Justice Lawrence Jenkins appointed Barrister Nishit Sen as the defense counsel. The accused Biren, was smiling while standing on the dock. He stated he had decided to plead guilty.

== Execution ==
A case was filed in the Calcutta High Court shortly after the murder of Shamsul Alam. This is the Howrah-Sibpur Conspiracy case as it is known. In this case, 48 people including Bagha Jatin were arrested on the charge of being involved in the murder of DSP Shamsul Alam. But it was almost impossible for the government to prove the allegations. Because Biren, the killer of Alam, did not answer a single question of the police. In this situation the government planned a heinous conspiracy. A paper similar to a secret proclamation of their revolutionary party was handed over to Birendra, which is not of that revolutionary party at all. Jatindranath Mukherjee 'signed' to that paper (Needless to say the signature is imitated) An article claims that the incident of Samsul's murder was premeditated by the police. The police spread rumours that Samsul Alam was not killed by Biren. Satish Sarkar (frictionous name) killed him. At the same time, in that article, Biren was mentioned as a police spy. Biren could not guess the point of this conspiracy of the police. He thought that Jatindranath had lied and proved him a traitor to his countrymen. Biren became desperate for this scandal and on the day before his execution (20 February 1910) he confessed that he had killed Samsul on the orders of Jatindranath. In this confession of Birendra, many other revolutionaries including Jatindranath faced a deep problem. Biren was hanged on 21 February 1910 in the present Alipore Presidency Jail. 1910). On the day of his execution he kept smiling and he went to the gallows cheerfully. He stated in his confession that he had killed Samsul on the orders of Jatindranath. In this confession of Birendra, many other revolutionaries including Jatindranath faced a deep problem. However, in the end, the contemporary police administration could not take advantage of Biren's confession. There are basically two reasons for this. First, the administration did not get a chance to verify the veracity of the allegations leveled against them as Biren was hanged before the trial of the rest of the revolutionaries began. Second, the government failed to prove the interaction of the revolutionaries as power was decentralized among the revolutionary secret societies in the decision of the far-sighted Jatindranath. As a result, the administration was forced to release 33 of the 48 imprisoned revolutionaries, including Jatindranath. After his release from jail, Jatindranath was dismissed from his job and devoted himself entirely to revolutionary activities. Other revolutionaries similarly refocused on their work. Therefore, as a result of Biren's confession, the humiliation that the British government had hoped for in the revolutionary movement in Bengal was never realized.
