= Howrah–Sibpur Conspiracy case =

1910 High Court case in India

On 24 January 1910 in Calcutta, 47 Indian nationalists of the Anushilan Samiti were arrested and tried in the wake of the murder of Inspector Shamsul Alam. Alam was Deputy superintendent and intelligence officer in Bengal Police investigating the murder of Naren Gosain, crown-witness in the Alipore bomb case, and other murders including those of Ashutosh Biswas, advocate of Calcutta High Court in charge of prosecution of Gossain murder case, and of Naren Bannerjee, the police officer who arrested Khudiram Bose. Alam had uncovered the underlying Bengali revolutionary network of the Anushilan Samiti that linked the murders and other robberies around this time, and at the time of his own murder at the hand of Biren Dutta Gupta, Alam was preparing to consolidate the charges to bring them all to trial in a single case.

47 of the accused were arrested by 29 January 1910. The trial of the accused commenced on 4 March 1910 with a second hearing in the Calcutta High Court in July 1910. However, the de-centralised structure of the Samiti meant the prosecution's attempts to demonstrate the crimes as linked and the Samiti as a unifying organisation failed. 33 of the accused were subsequently acquitted. Of the accused, Jatin Mukherjee and Narendranath Bhattacharjee were among those convicted and sentenced to one-year imprisonment.

The case is important in having brought Jatindranath Mukherjee's work and Samiti network under the scrutiny of the Raj. Jatindranath Mukherjee's policy of a loose, decentralised organisation generated scores of regional units, as observed by F.C. Daly more than once: "The gang is a heterogeneous one, with several advisers and petty chiefs... From information we have on record we may divide the gang into four parts: (1) Gurus, (2) Influential supporters, (3) Leaders, (4) Members." J.C. Nixon's report is more explicit : "Although a separate name and a separate individuality have been given to these various parties in this account of them, and although such a distinction was probably observed amongst the minor members, it is very clear that the bigger figures were in close communication with one another and were frequently accepted members of two or more of these samitis. It may be taken that at some time these various parties were engaged in anarchical crime independently, although in their revolutionary aims and usually in their origins they were all very closely related." Several observers pinpointed Jatin so accurately that the newly appointed Viceroy Lord Hardinge wrote more explicitly to Earl Crewe (H.M.'s Secretary of State for India): "As regards prosecution, I (...) deprecate the net being thrown so wide; as for example in the Howrah Gang Case, where 47 persons are being prosecuted, of whom only one is, I believe, the real criminal. If a concentrated effort had been made to convict this one criminal, I think it would have had a better effect than the prosecution of 46 misguided youths." On 28 May 1911, Hardinge recognised : "The 10th Jats case was part and parcel of the Howrah Gang Case; and with the failure in the latter, the Government of Bengal realised the futility of proceeding with the former... In fact, nothing could be worse, in my opinion, than the condition of Bengal and Eastern Bengal. There is practically no Government in either province..."
