= Amarendranath Chatterjee =

Indian independence movement activist

Amarendranath Chatterjee অমরেন্দ্রনাথ চট্টোপাধ্যায়
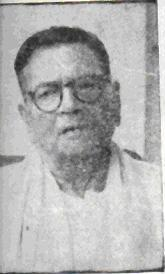
- Amarendranath Chatterjee
- Born: 1 July 1880; Uttarpara, Hooghly, Bengal, British India
- Died: 4 September 1957 (aged 77); Uttarpara, Hooghly, West Bengal, India
- Occupation: Revolutionary
- Organization: Jugantar
- Parent: Upendranath Chatterjee

Amarendranath Chatterjee (Bengali: অমরেন্দ্রনাথ চট্টোপাধ্যায়) (1 July 1880 – 4 September 1957) was an Indian independence movement activist. In charge of raising funds for the Jugantar movement, his activities largely covered revolutionary centres in Bihar, Odisha and the United Provinces.

== Early life ==
Born 1 July 1879 at Uttarpara, in the Hooghly district, near Kolkata, Amarendra was the son of Upendranath Chatterjee. On completing his primary education at Uttarpara and secondary at Bhagalpur, Amarendra joined the well-respected Duff College (now Scottish Church College) at Kolkata, where his classmates included Upendranath Bandhopadhyay and Hrishikesh Kanjilal, future revolutionary colleagues. After graduation, he and his friends accompanied Surendranath Banerjee in his lecture tours throughout India and, under the latter's influence, opened centres of social service. During the anti-Partition agitations, identifying with the programme of boycotting British goods, Amarendra led the National Volunteer Movement.

== First steps ==
Sponsored by Raja Pyarimohan and his son Rajendranath Mukherjee ('Misri Babu'), he established the Uttarpara Shilpa-Samiti, installed carpentry, bought six handlooms and began selling homespun textile. Very soon he looked after the Poragacha unit in Nadia, giving assistance to Jatindra Nath Mukherjee (Bagha Jatin or Jatin Mukherjee). They collaborated in the formation of the Chhatra Bhandar ("Students' Emporium"), which would be transformed later into the Shramajibi Samabaya ("Workers' Cooperative").

While Jatin Mukherjee "worked directly under the orders of Aurobindo Ghose" since 1903, Amarendra met Sri Aurobindo in 1907 and received initiation with these words: "Surrender yourself to God and in the name of the Divine Mother get along with the service of India. That is my Diksha to you." He was further told by Sri Aurobindo: "If we want to secure the freedom of the country, we have to sacrifice everything for it, and we should be ready to give up even our life for it. If we want to free the country, we shall have to conquer the fear of death." Encouraged by Sri Aurobindo to collect funds for the Extremists' movement, he came closer to Jatin Mukherjee. Behind their commercial activities, their centres sheltered freedom fighters from regional units, as well as provided meeting places for Jatin and other Jugantar leaders.

== Jugantar ==
Jatin's elderly revolutionary associate Preonath Karar (Sri Yukteswar Giri) of Serampore – friend of Hrishikesh Kanjilal and of the restless Vedic Pandit Mokshada Samadhyayi – had founded an Ashram at Puri in 1900; it had been in connection with Lokamanya Tilak's initiative to turn Benares and other Hindu shrines into seats of Extremist politics. Long before the hatching of the daily Jugantar at Benares, Puri instituted a religious procession in celebration of the advent of a New Era (yuga+antar). Sealy in his Report admits: "It would be extremely rash to argue that the place has not been freely used by the anarchist for sealing the compact of many a vow against the Government or that it has not been a recognised place of refuge for the fugitive from justice or surveillance by the police."

A few months before the Surat Congress, Suranath Bhaduri of Benares, on reaching Calcutta after travelling all over Bengal, "formed a central committee at the Sandhya office, with the help of Jatin Banerji (alias Niralamba Swami) and with Kartik Dutta; Mukhada Samadhyayi, Shyamsundar Chakravarti, Arabindo Ghose, Tarakhepa, Annada Charan Kaviraj and others as members(...) Measures are being devised for freeing India and for proclaiming the divine commands which have been received in the matter (...) After this Suranath went to Puri with Preo Nath Karar alias Sri Yukteswar Giri (...) Attempts are being made to get hold of such of the ruling Chiefs as are patrons of the Bharat Dharma Mahamandal. Raja Sasisekhareswar of Tahirpur ... is being fully converted to this creed." The Maharaj of Darbhanga was the General President of the Mahamandal; Suranath's father, Somnath Bhaduri, was the Maharaja's Private Secretary; Amarendra Chatterjee's father-in-law, Preonath Banerjee, was the manager of the Darbhanga Raj; the link was further close because one of Preonath Banerjee's nephews, Natbihari Chatterjee (son-in-law of the great Surendranath Banerjee), was munsif at Cuttack; another nephew, Dhiren Mukherjee, taught at the Ravenshaw Collegiate School. Amarendra had free access not only to these patriots but, also, to the headmaster of this school (later principal of the Ravenshaw College), Khirodchandra Ray Chaudhuri, who edited and published the "scurrilous" (to quote Sealy) daily, Star of Utkal.

Khirodchandra's son, Sukumar, practised as a barrister at Cuttack and had married a daughter of Dr Aghore Nath Chatterjee "who was deported by the Nizam of Hyderabad for intriguing against the British Government." The most illustrious of Aghore Nath's children was Virendranath Chattopadhyay ("Chatto", the revolutionary of international reputation); among the others was the patriotic Mrinalini Chatterjee who formed a trio with Kumudini Mitra and Sarojini Ghose (respectively cousin and sister of Sri Aurobindo). The poet Harin and the politician Sarojini Naidu were two other of Aghore Nath's children. Another member of this circle was the pleader Bishwanath Kar of Cuttack who enjoyed a close friendship with eminent national leaders such as Dr Sundari Mohan Das, Surendranath Banerjee and Bipin Chandra Pal.

These leaders had also been mentors for the significant revolutionary Bairagi Tripathi of Patia (district Cuttack) who was personally helped in his education by Madhusudan Das and the Raja of Kanika; on reaching Calcutta, Bairagi had become – in imitation of the Hyde Park spirit in London - "a troublesome agitator and lecturer of the Calcutta open-air platform. His first appearance was at a meeting presided over by Amarendra Chatterjee and after Liaqat Hossain was served with an order under the Calcutta Police Act, Bairagi became very vehement at meetings organised by Liaqat and himself on almost all political questions (...) Bairagi himself was evicted from Bengal and was eventually interned at Cuttack."

The Ramakrishna Mission had a branch at Puri, known as the Sashi Niketan and, according to the Police reports, this place had always been visited by "suspicious strangers", including Jatin Mukherjee and Amarendra Chatterjee. According to Sealy's Report, in 1910, the latter made a determined effort to establish an Ashram at Puri, in a building near the Jagannath Temple, called Srikshetra Sevashram, ostensibly for philanthropic purposes but, in reality, for the education and training of political missionaries. This institution, too, was under the patronage of the Raja of Tahirpur. In addition to Basanta Kumar Biswas, Amarendra was helped by Sushil and Sushen, brothers of Satish Mukherjee (who had been sentenced in 1908 in connection with the Alipore Bomb Case, and came to be known as Swami Muktananda) : all of them served as links with the Benares unit. During the ratha-yatra festival, Amarendra and his associates wore red crosses and distributed medicines to pilgrims. The Temple Manager wrote to the District Magistrate in 1911 that he had "noticed signs of attempts by Bengali agitators to turn the temple into a centre for the Swadeshi movement and political agitation." This letter rejoiced the divide and rule policy of the English, while Amarendra had to abandon the idea.

== Indo-German conspiracy ==
Since Sri Aurobindo's retiring to Pondicherry in 1910, Amarendra closely associated with Jatin's followers such as Atulkrishna Ghosh, M.N. Roy and Bipin Behari Ganguli, and served as intermediary between Jatin Mukherjee and Rasbehari Bose, becoming a key-figure in the Indo-German Conspiracy under Jatin during World War I. Two of his faithful lieutenants – Basanta Kumar Biswas and Manmatha Nath Biswas went to North India to assist Rasbehari in an attempt to murder Lord Hardinge; immediately after Basanta's capital punishment in this connection, Amarendra was blacklisted by the Police.

Bholanath Chatterjee and Parikhit Mukherjee had been working with Naren Bhattacharya under Jatin Mukherjee's direct leadership. Since March 1915, they were "sent off to Sambalpur side, to prospect establishing connection along the Bombay line to Nagpur connected up with Nilgiri and Mayurbhanj." At Chakradharpur they received hospitality from Ashu Kundu of Kumarkhali (Nadia) and stayed in Manoharpur, hired a house at Kalunga in August, went to Banposh, Bisra, Mohanpur, and Sonua, where they stayed with Girindra Mukherjee who had visited Shyamji Krishna Varma in Europe and Myron Phelps in the US, and had been in correspondence with them. Reminding that one of the addresses to which money from the Far East could reach the revolutionaries was Sonua Stone & Lime Co. with its office at 101/1 Clive Street, Calcutta, Sealy points out how its owner, Sudhangshu Mukherjee – one of the directors of the Shramajibi Samabaya – was "a puppet in Amarendra Chatterji's hands."

In 1909, Amarendra brought out a Bengali edition of Sri Aurobindo's Karmayogin; the paper collapsed in 1910 after having published a violent letter. He adopted the guise of a monk. Amarendra's next enterprise was the above-mentioned "Labour League" (Shramajibi Samabaya), a flourishing Limited Liability Company, with the real object of defraying the expenses of preaching Nationalism. In 1911, at Puri, he became the leader of a "gang of sannyasis" banded together with the object of disseminating sedition. He was found selling a book entitled The Life of Arabindo Ghose. In "A Note on the Ramakrishna Mission", Charles Tegart recognised that the flood relief in 1913 in the districts of Burdwan, Hooghly, and Midnapore "was eagerly seized upon by the revolutionary parties, both of the Eastern and Western Bengal, who (...) doubtless utilised the opportunity thus afforded to map out their future plan of campaign." Describing Amarendra "to be an exceedingly active and dangerous conspirator at the present time," Tegart proved how the Mission financed him for these relief operations.

Denham, in 1914, kept under observation for a considerable time Naren Bhattacharya's mess at 133 Lower Circular Road in Calcutta, which was visited by Amarendra and Makhan Sen to see and confer with Jatin Mukherjee. In the same Report, dated 22 April 1914, Tegart states that even up to date, the Ramakrishna Mission at Belur and its recognised branches were not entirely free from objectionable features: "For instance, on the seventy-ninth birthday anniversary of Ramakrishna, which was celebrated at Belur on 1 March last, in the presence of a very large gathering, it is reported that Amarendra Nath Chatterjee and Makhanlal Sen, Jatindra Nath Mukherjee and other prominent members of the revolutionary party, were noticed feeding the poor and generally assisting the authorities of the Math in attending to the welfare of their visitors."

In April, 1915, Jatin Mukherjee agreed to leave Calcutta for Balasore: having supervised the expedition, Amarendra and Ramchandra Majumdar reminded the escorts: "Never forget that the Soul of Bengal is entrusted to you." After spending a few days with the regional leader Atul Sen, Headmaster of the local school, the party left with Pandit Hem Mukherjee to his village Kumar-Ada near Mahishadal. Then, via Balasore and Nilgiri, they reached Kaptipoda.

At this juncture, before setting out for the Far East, Naren Bhattacharya – after having brought to his colleagues at Calcutta the good news of Jatin Mukherjee's convenient settling at Kaptipoda and the exact modes of getting orders from Balasore for the route to Kaptipada – returned there to receive blessings from his Guru, Jatin. With a passport issued in the name of C.A. Martin, he arrived at Batavia (Djakarta) on 30 April, and was welcomed by Erich Windels, the German Consul, who presented him also to the brothers Helfferich, Theodor and Emil, officially designated by the German Government to deal with the Maverick project. In addition to their family plantations, the Helfferichs looked after a flourishing business there; as manager of the Behn Meyers Company, Theodor took down from Naren detailed instructions sent by Jatin Mukherjee concerning the delivery of the Maverick consignment. He noted also the addresses of Harry & Sons (Harikumar Chakravarti) and of Shramajibi Samabaya (Amarendra Chatterjee) at Calcutta for all urgent communications.

Satisfied with his trip to Batavia (present day Jakarta), on 15 May 1915, Naren sent a telegram to Harikumar from Weltevreden, Java: "Sugar business helpful. Martin". Having probably made a detour by China, on 29 May he sent another message to Calcutta: "Back here; business good; sugar contracted; shipment after 2 weeks; anxious for affairs there. Wire. Martin." Having received from the Helfferichs a first remittance of 43.000 rupees, Naren worked out with Abdur Salam – a Kashmiri Muslim actively involved in the Extremists' project – to transfer a great portion of this money to Harry & Sons through the intermediary of the firm Chotirmull & Co, belonging to Indian tradesmen from the Sindh, having its dynamic branch offices in the Far East.

== Fish of the deep ==
At the top of a period of hectic preparations from the revolutionaries' side, when on 7 August 1915, Denham searched the Harry & Sons and the Shramajibi Samabaya, he had no warrant for arresting Amarendra, but warned the latter: "You are a fish of the deep water!" That was the last contact the police had with Amarendra, just before he absconded. Sealy's Report desperately added: "In 1915 his very important share in the gun-running conspiracy [under Jatin Mukherjee] and its ramifications came to light but he disappeared and has completely baffled all efforts to trace him."

While absconding in Chandernagore after Jatin Mukherjee's heroic self-undoing in 1915, Amarendra narrowly escaped in the teeth of an armed Police cordon, travelled through Assam, Uttar Pradesh and Punjab, received initiation as a Sikh monk, tirelessly visiting pilgrimages all over India, under the identity of the Punjabi Sadhu ("Hermit"). After the War, on learning about the amnesty during a lecture tour in the South, still disguised as a sannyasi, he paid a visit to Sri Aurobindo, who received heartily the old disciple.

== Later life ==
On returning to Bengal, Amarendra took up the Cherry Press to issue the Atmashakti, offering to Deshabandhu Chitta Ranjan Das the full sympathy of his Jugantar fellows within the framework of the Swarajya Party. On serving a short term prison, he was released in 1923 and was appointed by Suresh Majumdar (Bagha Jatin's follower) as the President of the Karmi Sangha ("Community of Workers"). In the early 1920s, Suresh is said to have received considerable help from Amarendra in financing and founding the Anandabazar group of papers. Elected to the Assembly in 1929, he joined the Dundee March in 1930 and spent a year in the prison. As a member of the Central Legislative Assembly, representing Madan Mohan Malaviya's Congress Nationalist Party (1937–1945), he preferred the programme of his revolutionary associate M.N. Roy (Naren Bhattacharya) and joined the Radical Democratic Party in 1945. He died in Uttarpara in 1957.

== See also ==
- Bagha Jatin
- Basanta Kumar Biswas
- Rash Behari Bose
- Sri Aurobindo
- M. N. Roy
- Bholanath Chatterjee
