= Yogendra Vidyabhushan =

Indian politician (1845–1904)

- যোগেন্দ্রনাথ বিদ্যাভূষণ
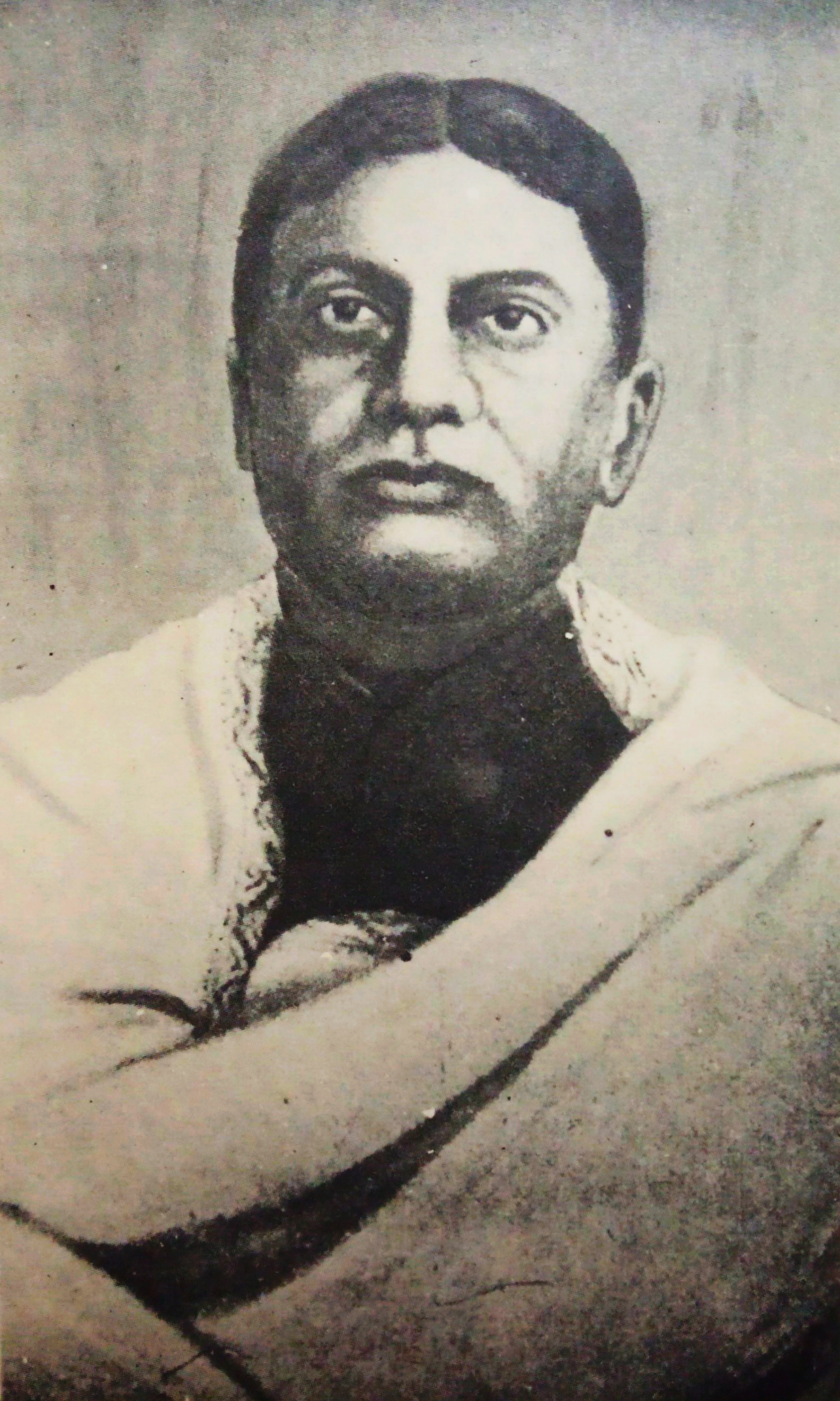
- Born: 12 July 1845; Simhat Village, Ranaghat, Nadia, British India (now West Bengal, India)
- Died: 12 June 1904 (aged 58); Calcutta, Bengal Presidency, British India
- Education: Sanskrit college, Calcutta University
- Occupations: Sanskrit Scholar, Journalist, Biographer
- Spouse: Mahalakhi(died.1869) Malatilata
- Parent(s): Umesh Chandra Bandyopadhay (Father), Sonamoni Devi (Mother)

Yogendra (or Jogendra) Vidyabhushan (Banerjee) (1845–1904) was an Indian Bengali scholar in Sanskrit, thinker, journalist and popular author of biographies which stirred patriotic zeal in the readers' heart. Loved by Ishwarchandra Vidyasagar, admired by Swami Vivekananda and Sri Aurobindo, he helped the rise of militant nationalism.

== Early life ==
Yogendra was born at the village Simhat in Ranaghat subdivision of West Bengal, at his maternal grandfather's house. Belonging to an orthodox Brahman family, his mother Sonamani (née Chatterjee) was as pious as stern. His father Umesh Chandra Banerjee hailed from the village Suvarnapur in the district of Nadia. A modest landholder, he was fond of religious studies and meditation. Yogendra's younger brother Mahendra was to be a prosperous London-bred physician. After the village school, Yogendra went first to the Zilla School at Barishal and, then, at Barasat. Admitted into Reverend Long's school at Calcutta, he obtained several scholarships. At 13, Yogendra joined the Sanskrit College of the University of Calcutta, where he drew the attention of its principal, Ishwarchandra Vidyasagar. Among his classmates were Vijaykrishna Goswami and Shivnath Shastri. In 1872 he and Shivnath passed their M.A. in Sanskrit successfully and both of them received the title of Vidyabhushan.

Yogendra had to face a few sad events before settling as a family man. According to Shivnath's autobiography, in 1868, encouraged by Vidyasagar, widowed Yogendra had married Mahalakshmi, a widow herself. Victim of an epidemic of cholera, she was to die in 1869. In 1871, Vidyasagar asked him again to marry Malatimala, daughter of late Madanmohan Tarkalamkar, Vidyasagar's childhood friend and colleague at the Sanskrit College. This union was blessed with three sons and three daughters.

== Career ==
After eight years of career as professor of Sanskrit, in November 1880, Yogendra was appointed Deputy Magistrate and Deputy Collector in several districts. Following the popularity of Bangadarshan edited by Bankimchandra Chatterjee, in April 1874 Yogendra published his Aryadarshan, to promote "history, science and philosophy, leaving ample scope for poetry, arts and fiction as well." During eleven years this paper inspired the Bengali reading public. Though Yogendra did not take part in active politics, his spirit of independence was a draw-back for promotion in Government service.

Racial prejudice had dismissed Surendranath Banerjee (1848–1925) from Indian Civil Service; in 1875, disappointed with the colonial system of justice, he chose the career of Professor of English, and sought to protect his countrymen from discrimination : he undertook lecture tours all over India, urging young Indians to draw inspiration from lives of Mazzini, Shivaji and the Sikh Gurus. Sir Henry Cotton was to acknowledge : "At the present moment the name of Surendranath Banerjee excites as much enthusiasm among the rising generation of Multan as in Dacca." Out of sympathy for this friend, Yogendra undertook to write popular and soul-stirring biographies in Bengali : John Stuart Mill (1878), Mazzini (1880), William Wallace (1886), Garibaldi (1890), two series of Veer Pujaa or 'Hero Worship' (1900), including William Tell, John Hamden, Wilberforce, John Howard, George Washington and several Indian profiles such as Keshub Chunder Sen, Ishwarchandra Vidyasagar, Vijaykrishna Goswami.

Sensitive to the socio-political problems of a New India, Yogendra claimed a liberal education for men and women, advocating equal rights for women. He was among the pioneers to claim Hindi as the national language. He advised students to get involved in the struggle for India's independence and to dedicate for this purpose all they had. In about 1894, on learning that coloured people of Abyssinia defeated Italy, Yogendra took a long leave and organised groups of young men to celebrate it all over the country. In reply to the appeal of Swami Vivekananda (1862–1902), he stood against the practice of caste and untouchability. Admiring his patriotic zeal, Swami Vivekananda once wrote on a wall in Yogendra's drawing-room: "India has to win her freedom by 1925." Flocks of nationalist militants went to contemplate this prediction. His second son Sachin was Captain of the Mohun Bagan football club and was to be a brilliant physician in the army during First World War. Having met Bagha Jatin (Mukherjee) at the gymnasium of the Guhas, Sachin brought him home and introduced him to Yogendra. In 1900, the latter's youngest daughter, Sudhamayi, was married to Lalitkumar Chatterjee, Jatin's maternal uncle and revolutionary colleague.

In September 1902, Yogendra took again one year's leave from July 1903. At this juncture, in 1903, Sri Aurobindo stayed with him at his house in Calcutta. Invited by Yogendra, Jatin and Lalit discussed their plans with Sri Aurobindo. This significant meeting led to the formation of the Jugantar. Yogendra died in June 1904.

Dr Jadugopal Mukherjee, one of the leading figures of the Jugantar, says people learnt to love the Motherland from Bankimchandra, from Yogendra Vidyabhushan and from Swami Vivekananda.

== Other sources ==
- History of the Services of Officers holding Gazetted Appointments under the Government of West Bengal, Calcutta, 1903
- Bharate jatiya andolan, by Prabhatkumar Mukhopadhyaya, Calcutta, 1925
- Sahitya sadhak charitmala No. 31, Calcutta, 1944
- Sadhak biplabi jatindranath by Prithwindra Mukherjee, West Bengal State Book Board, Calcutta, 1990.
