= Bagha Jatin =

Indian revolutionary (1879–1915)

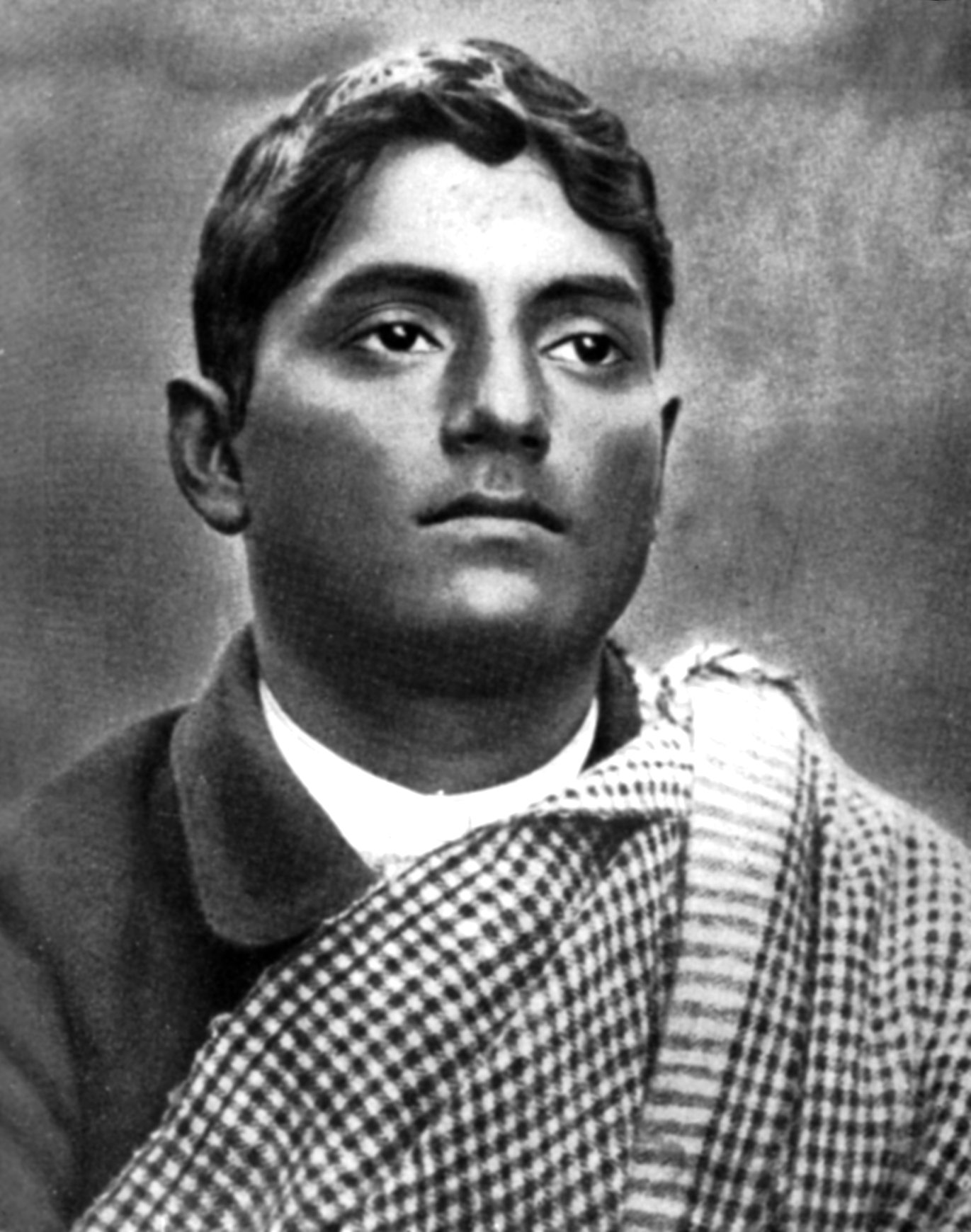
- Mukherjee in 1909
- Born: Jyotindra Nath Mukherjee; 8 December 1879; Kumarkhali, Kushtia, Bengal, British India
- Died: 10 September 1915 (aged 35); Balasore, Bihar and Orissa, British India
- Cause of death: Gunshot wound
- Other name: Bagha Jatin
- Education: University of Calcutta
- Occupations: Stenographer; Indian independence activist
- Organisation: Jugantar
- Known for: Freedom struggle
- Movement: Indian Independence movement
- Spouse: Indubala Banerjee (1900-1915)
- Children: 4

Signature
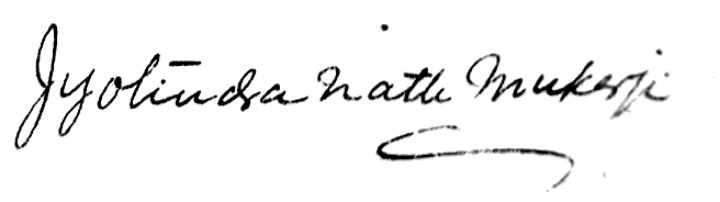

Bagha Jatin (lit. 'Tiger Jatin'; pronounced [ˈbaɡʰa ˈd͡ʒot̪in]) or Baghajatin, born Jatindranath Mukherjee (pronounced [ˈd͡ʒot̪ind̪roˌnatʰ ˈmukʰoˌpaddʰae̯]); 7 December 1879 – 10 September 1915) was an Indian independence activist.

He was one of the principal leaders of the Jugantar party that was the central association of revolutionary independence activists in Bengal.

== Early life ==
Jatin was born in a Bengali Brahmin family to Sharatshashi and Umeshchandra Mukherjee in Kayagram, a village in Kushtia, then part of undivided Nadia district, in what is now Khulna Division, Bangladesh, on 7 December 1879. He grew up in his ancestral home at Sadhuhati, P.S. Rishkhali, Jhenaidah until his father's death when Jatin was five years old. Well versed in Brahmanic studies, his father liked horses and was respected for the strength of his character. Sharatshashi settled in her parents' home in Kaya with her son and his elder sister Benodebala (or Vinodebala). A gifted poet, she was affectionate and stern in her method of raising her children. Familiar with the essays by contemporary thought leaders like Bankimchandra Chatterjee and Yogendra Vidyabhushan, she was aware of the social and political transformations of her times. Her brother Basanta Kumar Chattopadhyay (father of Indian revolutionary and politician Haripada Chattopadhyay) taught and practised law, and counted among his clients the poet Rabindranath Tagore. Since the age of 14, Tagore had claimed in meetings organised by his family members equal rights for Indian citizens inside railway carriages and in public places. As Jatin grew older, he gained a reputation for physical bravery and great strength; charitable and cheerful by nature, he was fond of caricature and enacting religious plays, himself playing the roles of god-loving characters like Prahlad, Dhruva, Hanuman, Râja Harish Chandra as well as courageous personalities like Pratapaditya. He not only encouraged several playwrights to produce patriotic pieces for the urban stage, but also engaged village bards to spread nationalist fervour in the countryside.

== Student in Calcutta ==
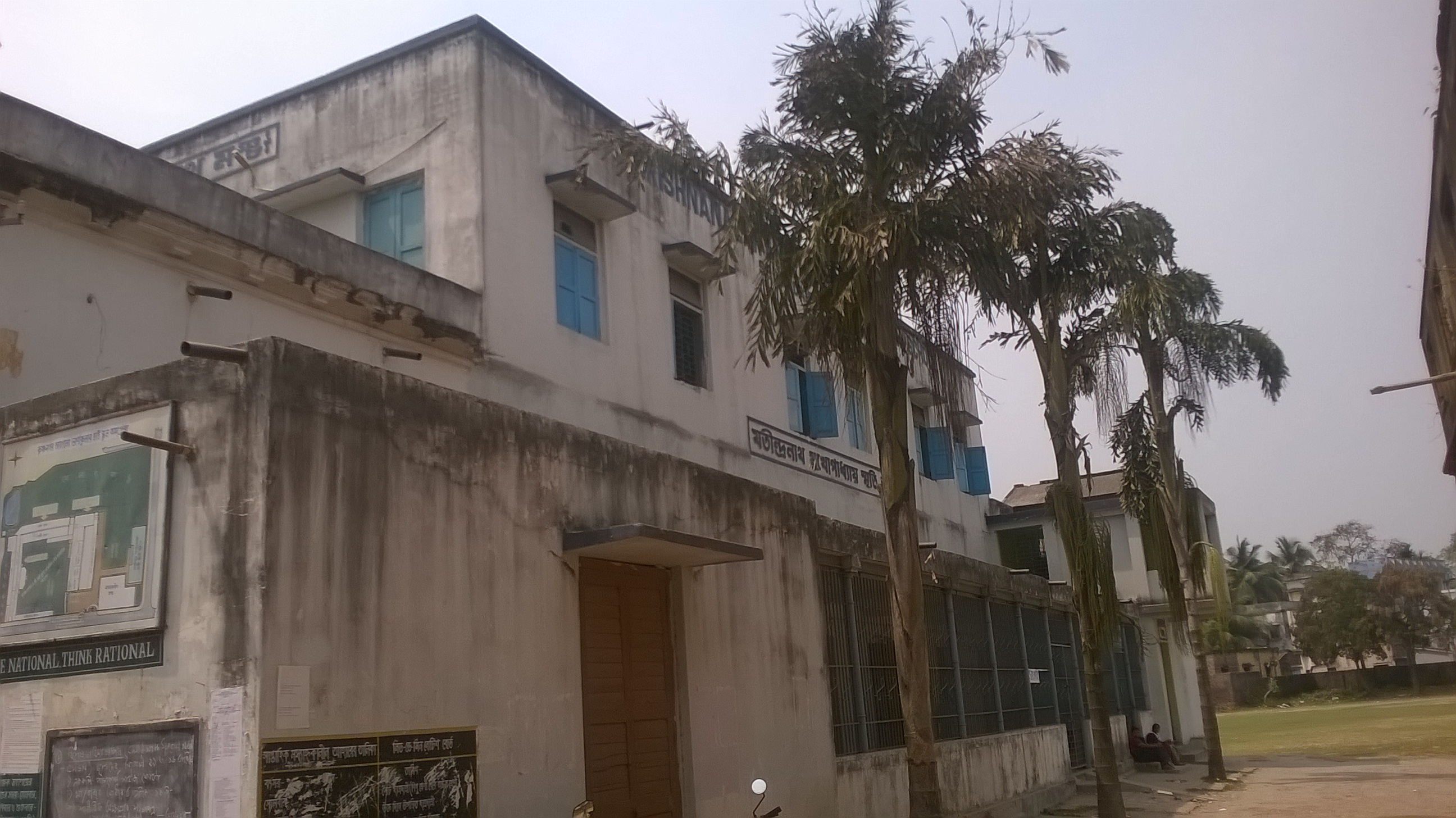
Anglo-vernacular School, Krishnanagar, Nadia

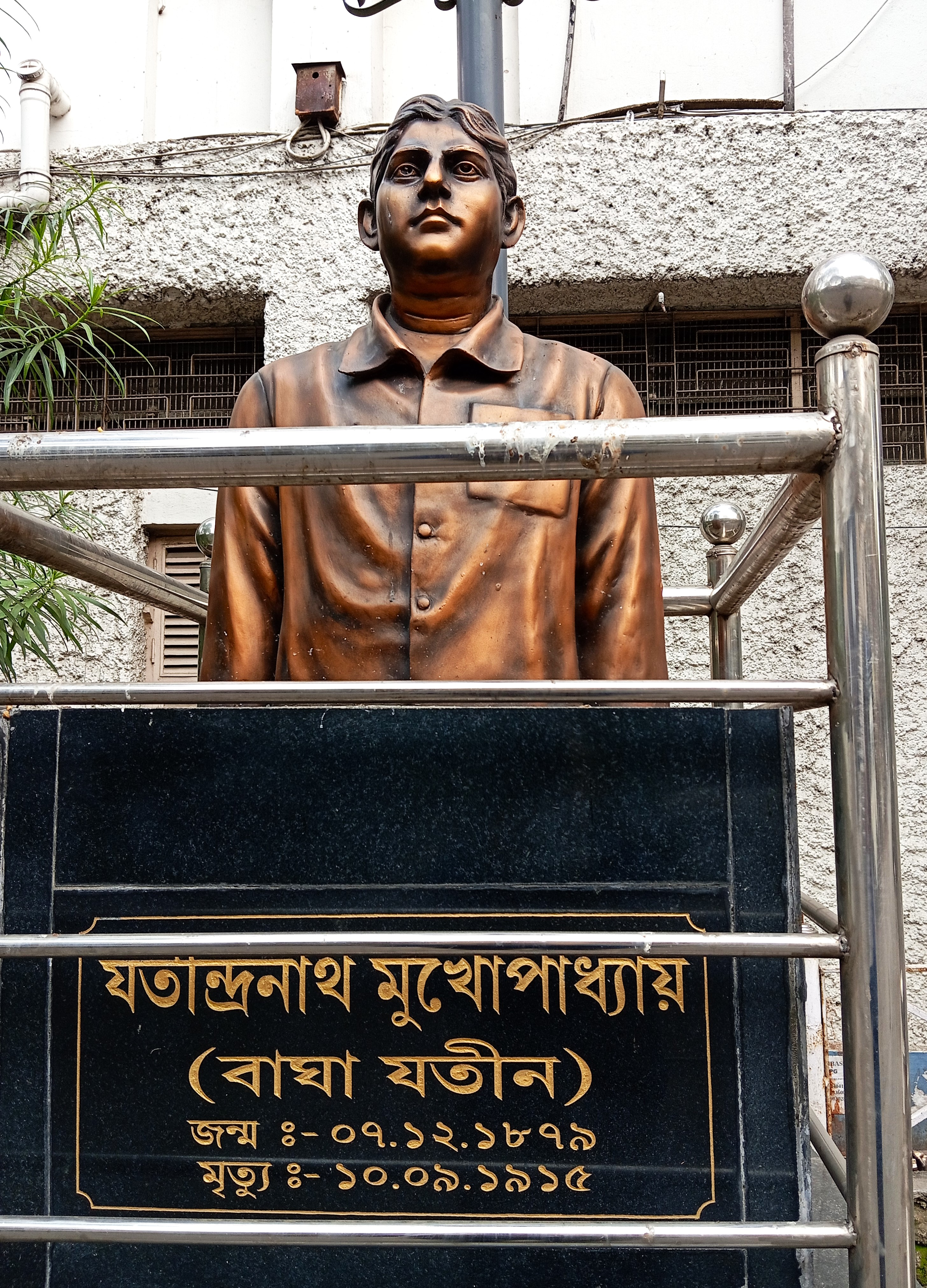
Statue of Bagha Jatin, Beadon Street, Kolkata, West Bengal

After passing the Entrance examination in 1895 from Krishnanagar A.V. High School in Krishnanagar, Jatin joined the Calcutta Central College (now Khudiram Bose Central College), to study Fine Arts. At the same time, he took lessons in steno typing with Mr. Atkinson. This was a new qualification opening the possibility of a coveted career. Soon he started visiting Swami Vivekananda, whose social thought, and especially his vision of a politically independent India – indispensable for the spiritual progress of humanity – had a great influence on Jatin. The Swami taught him the art of conquering libido before raising a batch of young volunteers "with iron muscles and nerves of steel", to serve miserable compatriots during famines, epidemics and floods and running clubs for "man-making" in the context of a nation under foreign domination. They soon assisted Sister Nivedita, the Swami's Irish disciple, in this venture. According to J. E. Armstrong, Superintendent of the colonial Police, Jatin "owed his preeminent position in revolutionary circles, not only to his qualities of leadership, but in great measure to his reputation of being a Brahmachari with no thought beyond the revolutionary cause." Noticing his desire to die for a cause, Vivekanand sent Jatin to the Gymnasium of Ambu Guha where he himself had practised wrestling. Jatin met here, among others, Sachin Banerjee, son of Yogendra Vidyabhushan (a popular author of biographies like Mazzini and Garibaldi), who turned into Jatin's mentor. In 1900, his uncle Lalit Kumar married Vidyabhushan's daughter.

Fed up with the colonial system of education, Jatin left for Muzaffarpur in 1899, as secretary of barrister Pringle Kennedy, founder and editor of the Trihoot Courrier. He was impressed by this historian; through his editorials and from the Congress platform, he showed how urgent it was to have an Indian National Army and to react against the British squandering of Indian budget to safeguard their interests in China and elsewhere.

== Marriage ==
In 1900, Jatin married Indubala Banerjee of Kumarkhali upazila in Kushtia; they had four children: Atindra (1903–1906), Ashalata (1907–1976), Tejendra (1909–1989), and Birendra (1913–1991). Struck by Atindra's death, Jatin, with his wife and sister, set out on a pilgrimage and recovered their inner peace by receiving initiation from the saint Bholanand Giri of Haridwar. Aware of his disciple's revolutionary commitments, the holy man extended to him his full support.

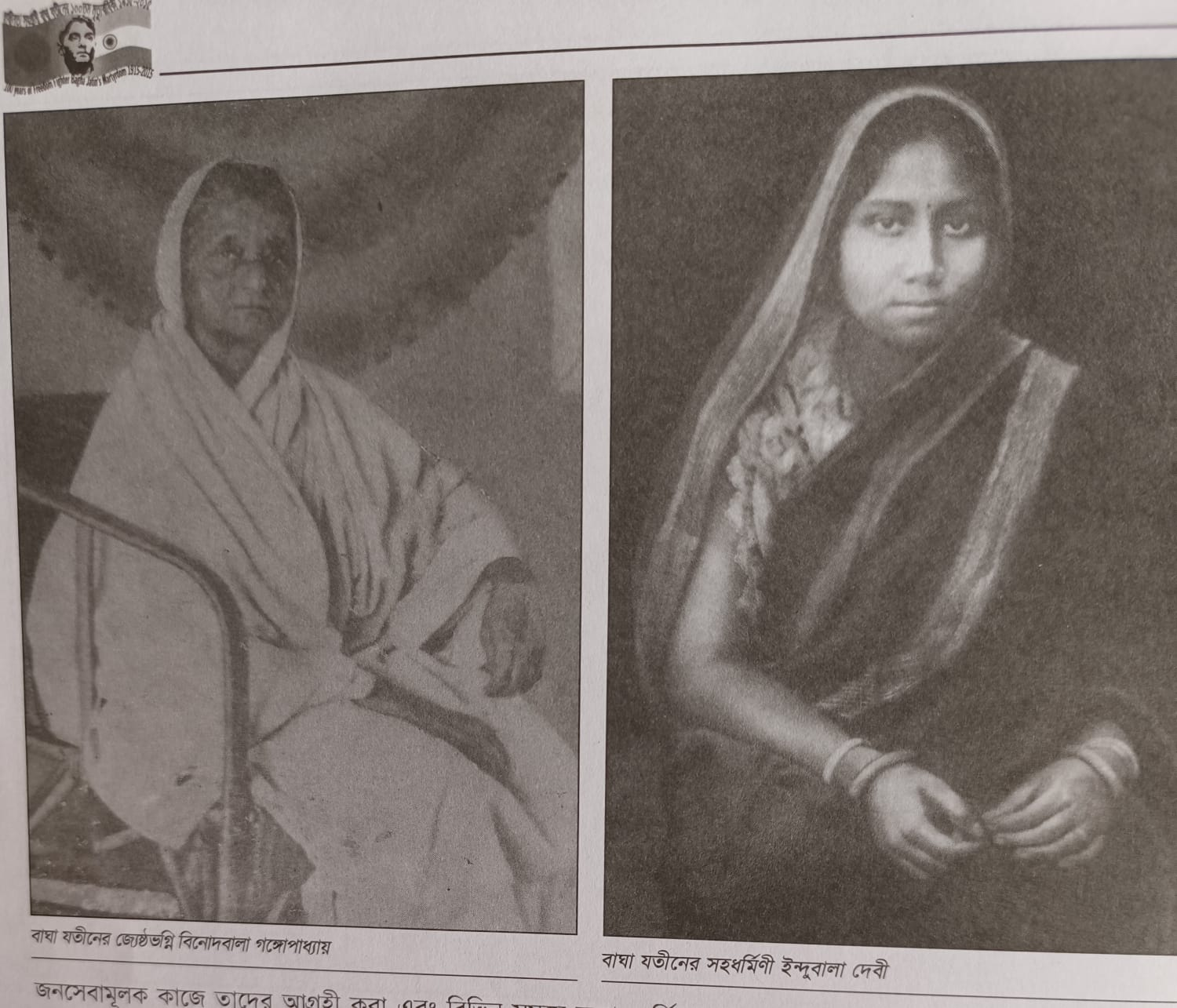
Bagha jatin's elder sister Binodbala Devi and Jatin's wife Indubala devi

== Title Bagha Jatin ==
Upon returning to his native village Koya in March 1906, Jatin learned about the disturbing presence of a tiger in the vicinity; while scouting in the nearby jungle, he came across a Royal Bengal tiger and fought hand-to-hand with it. Wounded, he managed to strike with a Small dagger (Khukuri) on the tiger's neck, killing it instantly. The famous surgeon of Calcutta, Suresh Prasad Sarbadhikari, "took upon himself the responsibility for curing ... [Jatin,] whose whole body had been poisoned by the tiger's nails." Impressed by Jatin's exemplary heroism, Dr. Sarbadhikari published an article about Jatin in the English press. The government of Bengal awarded him a silver shield with the scene of him killing the tiger engraved on it. The title 'Bagha', meaning 'Tiger' in Bengali, became associated with him since then.

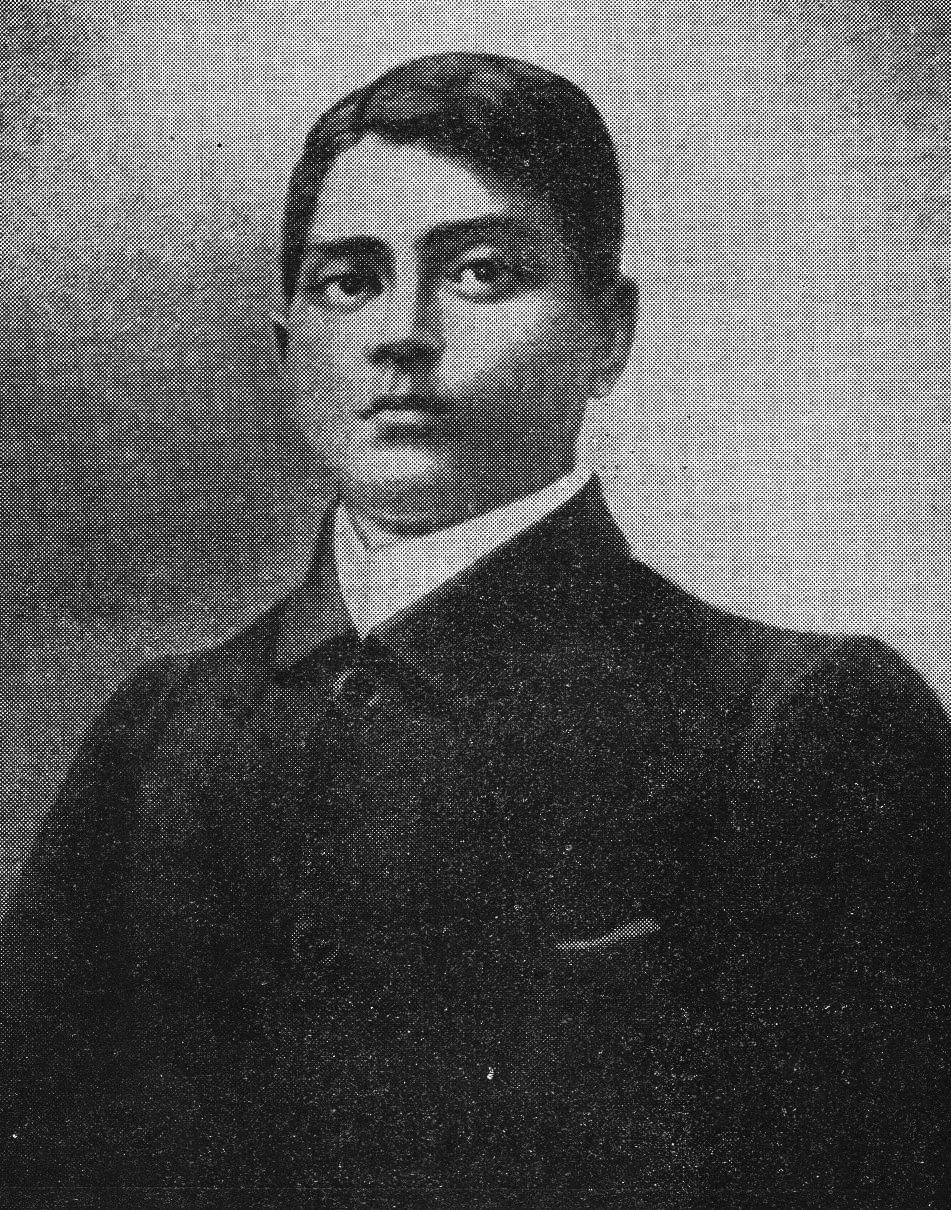
Revolutionary Jatin Mukherjee

== Revolutionary activities ==
Several sources mention Jatin as being among the founders of the Anushilan Samiti in 1902, and as a pioneer in creating its branches in the districts. According to Daly's Report: "A secret meeting was held in Calcutta about the year 1900 [...] The meeting resolved to start secret societies with the object of assassinating officials and supporters of Government [...] One of the first to flourish was at Kushtea, in the Nadia district. This was organised by one Jotindra Nath Mukherjee [sic!].". Nixon reports further: "The earliest known attempts in Bengal to promote societies for political or semi-political ends are associated with the names of the late P. Mitter, Barrister-at-Law, Miss Saralabala Ghosal and a Japanese named Okakura. These activities commenced in Calcutta somewhere about the year 1900, and are said to have spread to many of the districts of Bengal and to have flourished particularly at Kushtia, where Jatindra Nath Mukharji [sic!] was leader." Bhavabhushan Mitra's written notes precise his presence along with Jatindra Nath during the first meeting. A branch of this organisation (Anushilan Samiti), was to be inaugurated in Dacca. In 1903, on meeting Sri Aurobindo at Yogendra Vidyabhushan's place, Jatin decides to collaborate with him and is said to have added to his programme the clause of winning over the Indian soldiers of the British regiments in favour of an insurrection. W. Sealy in his report on "Connections with Bihar and Orissa" notes that Jatin Mukherjee "a close confederate of Nani Gopal Sen Gupta of the Howrah Gang (...) worked directly under the orders of Aurobindo Ghosh."

In 1905, during a procession to celebrate the visit of the Prince of Wales at Calcutta, Jatin decides to draw the attention of the future Emperor on the behaviour of HM's English officers. Not far from the royal coach, he singles out a cabriolet on a side-lane, with a group of English military men sitting on its roof, their booted legs dangling against the windows, seriously disturbing the livid faces of a few native ladies. Stopping beside the cab, Jatin asks the fellows to leave the ladies alone. In response to their cheeky provocation, Jatin rushes up to the roof and fell them with slaps till they drop on the ground. The show is not innocent. Jatin is well aware that John Morley, the Secretary of State, receives regularly complaints about the English attitude towards Indian citizens, "The use of rough language and pretty free use of whips and sticks, and brutalities of that sort..." He will be further intimated that the Prince of Wales, "on his return from the Indian tour had a long conversation with Morley [10/5/1906] (...) He spoke of the ungracious bearing of Europeans to Indians."

== Organiser of secret society ==
Jatin, set up a bomb factory near Deoghar, similar to the one set at Maniktala in Calcutta by Hemchandra Kanungo. Whereas Jatin disapproved of all untimely terrorist action, Barin led an organisation centred around his own personality: his aim was, aside from the general production of terror, the elimination of certain Indian and British officers serving the Crown. Side by side, Jatin developed a decentralised federated body of loose autonomous regional cells. Organising relentless relief missions with a paramedical body of volunteers following almost a military discipline, during natural calamities such as floods or epidemics, and religious pilgrimages such as the Ardhodaya Yog in Calcutta and the Kumbha Mela, or the annual celebration of Ramakrishna's birth, Jatin was suspected of utilising these as pretexts for group discussions with regional leaders and recruiting new freedom fighters to fight the supporters of the British.

In May 1907 he was deputed as a shorthand writer to Mr. O'Malley's Office in Darjeeling for the Gazetteer work. "From early youth he had the reputation of a local Sandow and he soon attracted attention in Darjeeling in cases in which (...) he tried to measure the strength with Europeans. In 1908 he was leader of one of several gangs that had sprung up in Darjeeling, whose object was the spreading of disaffection, and with his associates he started a branch of the Anushilan Samiti, called the Bandhab Samiti." In April 1908, in Siliguri railway station, Jatin got involved in a fight with a group of English military officers headed by Captain Murphy and Lt Somerville, leading to legal proceedings, widely covered by the press. On observing the gleeful animosity created by the news of a few Englishmen thrashed single-handed by an Indian, Wheeler advised the officers to withdraw the case. Warned by the Magistrate to behave properly in the future, Jatin regretted that he would not refrain from taking similar action in self-defence or in the vindication of the rights of his countrymen. One day, in a pleasant mood, Wheeler asked Jatin, "With how many can you fight all alone ?" The prompt reply was, "Not a single one, if it is a question of honest people; otherwise, as many as you can imagine!" In 1908 Jatin was not one of over thirty revolutionaries accused in the Alipore Bomb Case following the incident at Muzaffarpur. Hence, during the Alipore trial, Jatin took over the leadership of the secret society to be known as the Jugantar Party, and revitalised the links between the central organisation in Calcutta and its several branches spread all over Bengal, Bihar, Odisha and several places in Uttar Pradesh. Through Justice Sarada Charan Mitra, Jatin leased from Sir Daniel Hamilton lands in the Sundarbans to shelter revolutionaries not yet arrested. Atul Krishna Ghosh and Jatindranath Mukherjee founded Pathuriaghatat Byam Samity which was an important centre of armed revolution of the Indian national movement. They were engaged in night schools for adults, homeopathic dispensaries, workshops to encourage small scale cottage industries, and experiments in agriculture. Since 1906, with the help of Sir Daniel, Jatin had been sending meritorious students abroad for higher studies as well as for learning military craft.

== The Jatin Mukherjee spirit ==
After the Alipore Case, Jatin organised a series of what author Arun Chandra Guha describes as "daring" actions in Calcutta and in the districts, "to revive the confidence of the people in the movement ... These brought him into the limelight of revolutionary leadership although hardly anybody outside the innermost circle ever suspected his connection with those acts. Secrecy was absolute in those days – particularly with Jatin". Almost contemporaneous with the anarchist Bonnot Gang well known in France, Jatin invented and introduced in India bank robbery on automobile taxi-cabs, " a new feature in revolutionary crime. " Several outrages were committed: for instance, in 1908, on 2 June and 29 November; an attempt to assassinate the Lt Governor of Bengal on 7 November 1908; in 1909, on 27 February 23 April 16 August 24 September and 28 October; two assassinations – of the Prosecutor Ashutosh Biswas (on 10 February 1909) by Charu Chandra Bose, and the Deputy Superintendent of Police, Samsul Alam (on 24 January 1910): both these officers had been determined to get all the accused condemned. Arrested, outwitted by the Police, Biren Datta Gupta, the latter's assassin, disclosed Jatin's name as his leader.

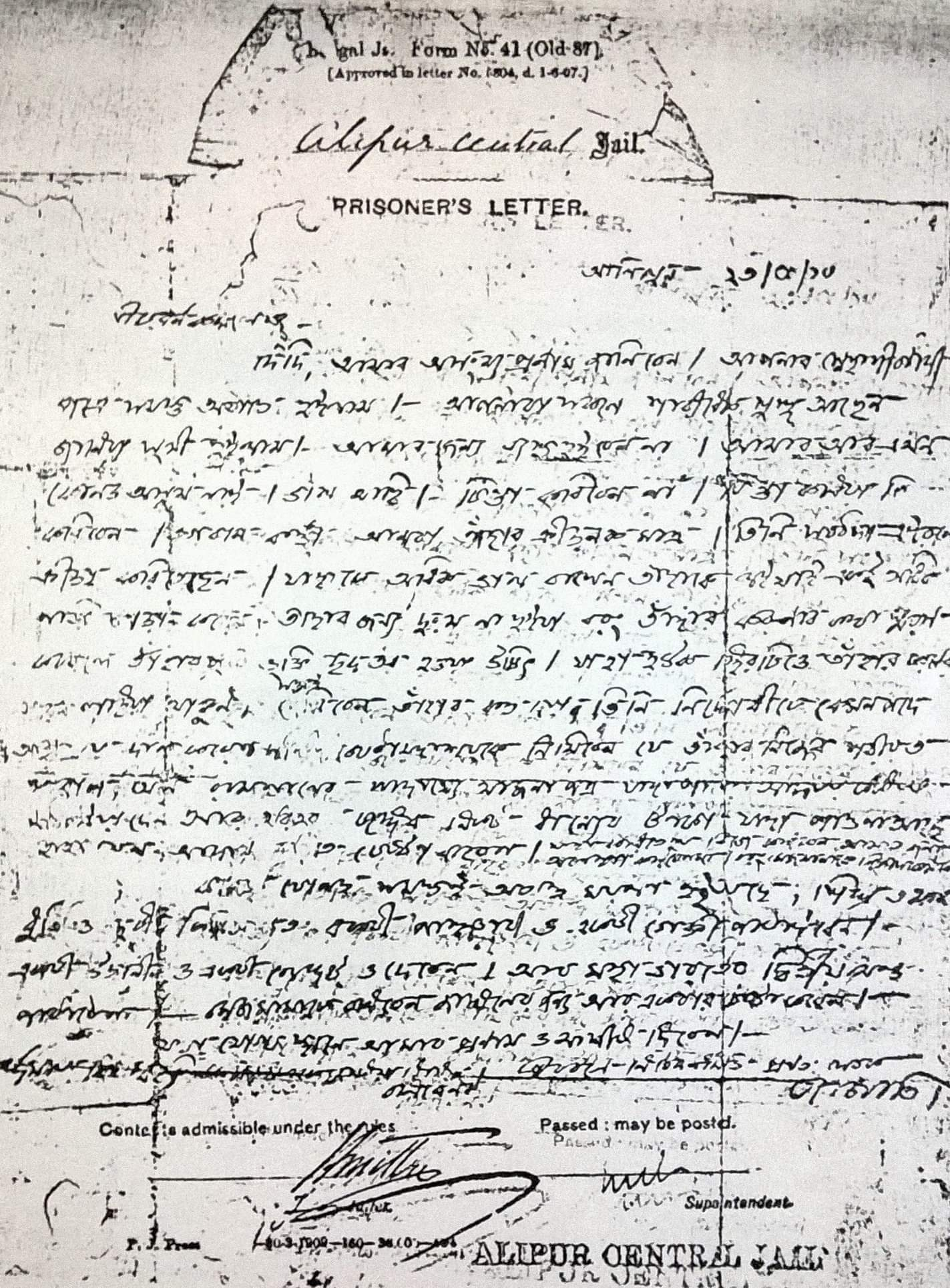
Mukherjee's letter to his elder sister, Binodbala, from Alipore jail

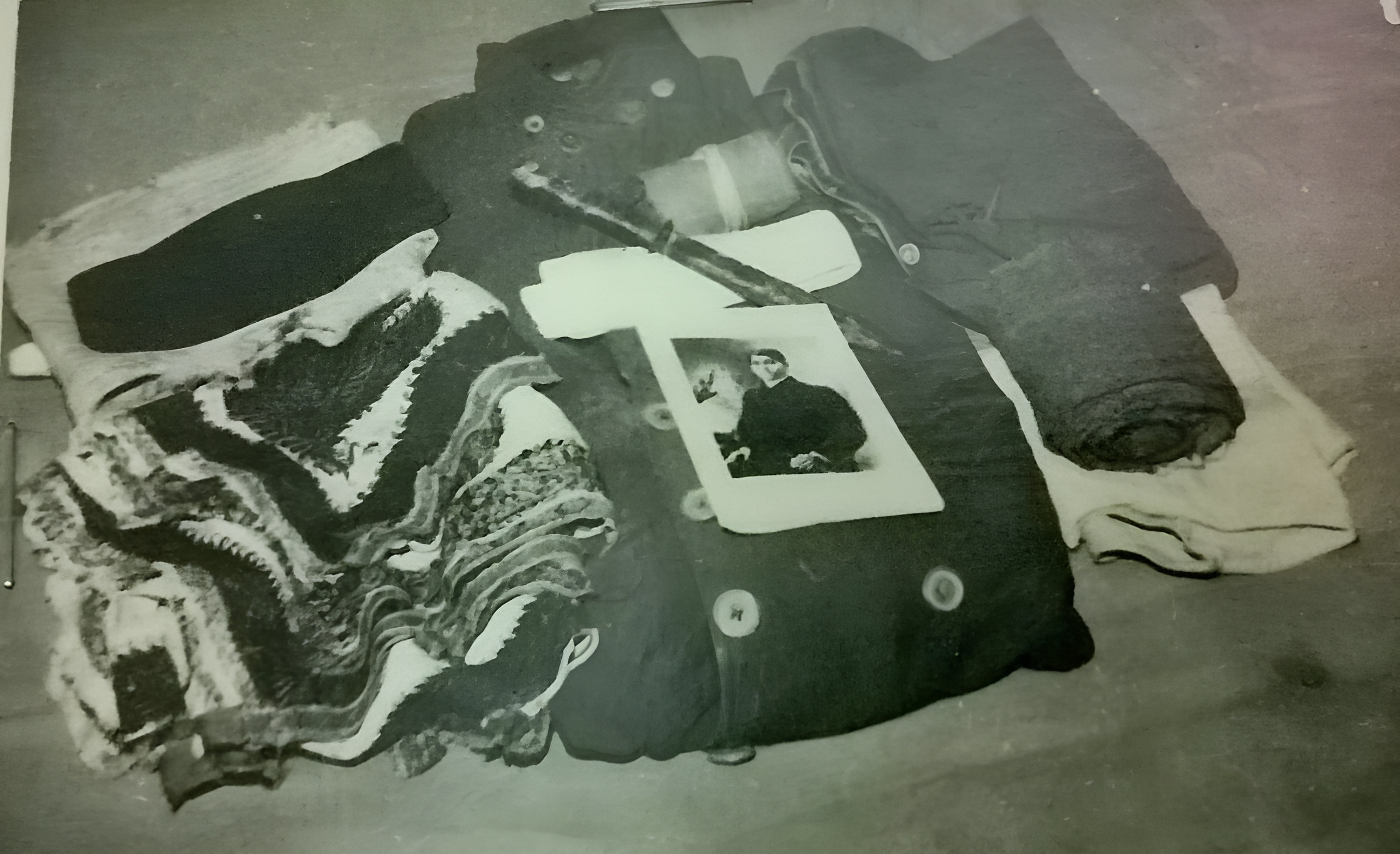
The clothes of Bagha jatin

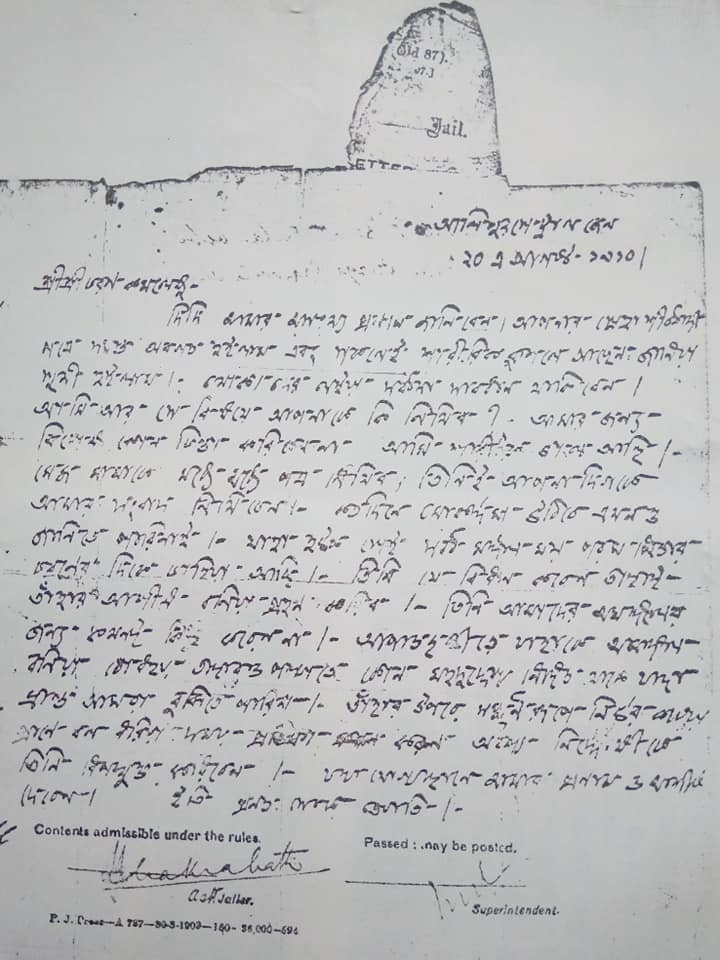
Letter written by Bagha Jatin from Alipore Central Jail on 20.08.1910

== The Howrah-Sibpur conspiracy case ==
On 25 January 1910, "with the gloom of his assassination hanging over everyone", the Viceroy Minto declared openly: "A spirit hitherto unknown to India has come into existence (...), a spirit of anarchy and lawlessness which seeks to subvert not only British rule but the Governments of Indian chiefs..." On 27 January 1910, Jatin was arrested in connection with this murder, but was released, to be immediately re-arrested along with forty-six others in connection with the Howrah-Sibpur conspiracy case, popularly known as the Howrah Gang Case. The major charge against Jatin Mukherjee and his party during the trial (1910–1911) was "conspiracy to wage war against the King-Emperor" and "tampering with the loyalty of the Indian soldiers" (mainly with the 10th Jats Regiment) posted in Fort William, and soldiers in Upper Indian Cantonments. While held in Howrah jail, awaiting trial, Jatin made contact with a few fellow prisoners, prominent revolutionaries belonging to various groups operating in different parts of Bengal, who were all accused in this case. He was also informed by his emissaries abroad that very soon Germany was to declare war against England. Jatin counted heavily on this war to organise an armed uprising along with Indian soldiers in various regiments.

The case failed because of lack of proper evidence thanks to Jatin's policy of a loose decentralised organisation federating scores of regional units, as observed by F.C. Daly more than once: "The gang is a heterogeneous one, with several advisers and petty chiefs... From the information we have on record we may divide the gang into four parts: (1) Gurus, (2) Influential supporters, (3) Leaders, (4) Members." J.C. Nixon's report is more explicit: "Although a separate name and a separate individuality have been given to these various parties in this account of them, and although such a distinction was probably observed amongst the minor members, it is very clear that the bigger figures were in close communication with one another and were frequently accepted members of two or more of these samitis. It may be taken that at some time these various parties were engaged in anarchical crime independently, although in their revolutionary aims and usually in their origins they were all very closely related." Several observers pinpointed Jatin so accurately that the newly appointed Viceroy Lord Hardinge wrote more explicitly to Earl Crewe (H.M.'s Secretary of State for India): "As regards prosecution, I (...) deprecate the net being thrown so wide; as for example in the Howrah Gang Case, where 47 persons are being prosecuted, of whom only one is, I believe, the real criminal. If a concentrated effort had been made to convict this one criminal, I think it would have had a better effect than the prosecution of 46 misguided youths." On 28 May 1911, Hardinge recognised: "The 10th Jats case was part and parcel of the Howrah Gang Case; and with the failure in the latter, the Government of Bengal realised the futility of proceeding with the former... In fact, nothing could be worse, in my opinion, than the condition of Bengal and Eastern Bengal. There is practically no Government in either province..."

== A new perspective ==
Jatin Mukherjee was not involved in the Alipore Bomb case. Jatin was acquitted in February 1911 and released. Immediately, he suspended armed revolution. This stalemate proved Jatin's full command of violence as an antidote, contrary to the Chauri Chaura incident after him. During the German Crown Prince's visit to Calcutta, Jatin met him and received a promise about arms supply. Having lost his government job – and home interned, he managed to leave Calcutta, to start a contract business constructing the Jessore–Jhenaidah railway line. This provided him with a valid pretext and an ample scope to move about on horse-back or on the bicycle to consolidate not only the district units in Bengal, but also to revitalise those in other provinces. Jatin with his family set out on a pilgrimage, and at Haridwar visited his Guru, Bholananda Giri. Jatin went on to Brindavan where he met Swami Niralamba (who had been Jatindra Nath Banerjee, the renowned revolutionary, before leading a sanyasi's life); he had continued preaching in North India Sri Aurobindo's doctrine of a revolution.

Niralamba gave Jatin complementary information about, and links to, the units set up by him in Uttar Pradesh and the Punjab. An important part of revolutionary activities in these regions were led by Rasbehari Bose and his associate Lala Hardayal. On returning from his pilgrimage, Jatin started reorganising Jugantar accordingly. During the Damodar flood in 1913, mainly in the districts of Burdwan and Midnapore, relief work brought together leaders of various groups: Jatin "never asserted his leadership, but the party members in the different districts acclaimed him as their leader."

Meeting with Jatin increased Rasbehari Bose's revolutionary zeal: in Jatin, he discovered "a real leader of men". At the close of 1913, they met to discuss the possibilities of an armed rising of the 1857 type. Impressed by Jatin's "fiery energy and personality", Bose sounded out non-commissioned officers posted at the Fort William of Calcutta, the nerve centre of the various regiments of the colonial army, before returning to Benares "to organise the scattered forces."

There were also attempts to organise expatriate Indian revolutionaries in Europe and the United States. Jatin's influence was international. The Bengali bestseller Dhan Gopal Mukerji, settled in New York City and, at the summit of his glory, was to write : "Before 1914 we succeeded in disturbing the equilibrium of the government... Then extraordinary powers were given to the police, who called us anarchists to prejudice us forever in the eyes of the world... Dost thou remember Jyotin, our cousin – he that once killed a leopard with a dagger, putting his left elbow in the leopard's mouth and with his right hand thrusting the knife through the brute's eye deep into its brain? He was a very great man and our first leader. He could think of God ten days at a stretch, but he was doomed when the Government found out that he was our head."

Right since 1907, Jatin's emissary, Taraknath Das had been organising, with Guran Ditt Kumar and Surendramohan Bose, evening schools for Indian immigrants (a majority of them Hindus and Sikhs) between Vancouver and San Francisco, through Seattle and Portland: in addition to learning how to read and write simple English, they were informed about their rights in the USA and their duty towards Mother India: two periodicals – Free Hindustan (In English, sponsored by local Irish revolutionaries) and Swadesh Sevak ('Servants of the Motherland', in Gurumukhi) – became increasingly popular. In regular contact with Calcutta and London (where the organisation was managed by Shyamji Krishnavarma), Das wrote regularly to personalities throughout the world (like Leo Tolstoy and Éamon de Valera). In May 1913, Kumar left for Manilla to create a satellite linking Asia with the American West Coast. Familiar with the doctrine of Sri Aurobindo and an erstwhile follower of Rasbehari Bose, in 1913, invited by Das, Har Dayal resigned from his teaching job at the University of Berkeley, coaxed by Jiten Lahiri (one of Jatin's emissaries) of wasting his time in daydreaming, Har Dayal set out on a lecture tour covering the major centres of Indian immigrants; enlivened by their patriotism, he preached open revolt against the English rulers of India. Welcomed by the Indian militants of San Francisco, in November, he founded his journal Ghadar ('Revolt') and the Yugantar Ashram, as a tribute to Sri Aurobindo. The Sikh community also became involved in the movement.

== During World War I ==
Shortly after when World War I broke out, in September 1914, an International Pro-India Committee was formed at Zürich. Very soon it merged into a bigger body, to form the Berlin Committee, or the Indian Independence Committee, led by Virendranath Chattopadhyaya alias Chatto: it gained the support of the German government and had as members prominent Indian revolutionaries abroad, including leaders of the Ghadar Party. Freedom fighters of the Ghadar Party started leaving for India, to join the proposed uprising inside India during World War I, with the help of arms, ammunition, and funds promised by the German government. Advised by Berlin, Ambassador Bernstorff in Washington arranged with Von Papen, his military attaché, to send cargo consignments from California to the coast of the Bay of Bengal, via Far East.

These efforts were directly connected with the Jugantar, under Jatin's leadership, in its planning and organising an armed revolt. Rash Behari Bose assumed the task of carrying out the plan in Uttar Pradesh and Punjab. This international chain work conceived by Jatin came to be known as the German Plot, the Hindu–German Conspiracy, or the Zimmermann Plan. Jugantar started to collect funds by organising a series of dacoities (armed robberies) known as "Taxicab dacoities" and "Boat dacoities". Charles Tegart, in his "Report No. V" on the seditious organisations mentions the "certain amount of success" in the contact that exists between the revolutionaries and the Sikh soldiers posted at Dakshineshwar gunpowder magazine; Jatin Mukherjee in company of Satyendra Sen was seen interviewing these Sikhs. Sen "is the man who came to India with Pingle. Their mission was specially to tamper with the troops. Pingle was captured in Punjab with bombs and was hanged, while Satyen was interned under Regulation III in the Presidency Jail." With Jatin's written instructions, Pingle and Kartar Singh Sarabha met Rasbehari in North India.

Preoccupied by the increasing police activities to prevent any uprising, eminent Jugantar members suggested that Jatin should move to a safer place. Balasore on the Odisha coast was selected as a suitable place, being very near the spot where German arms are to be landed for the Indian rising. To facilitate transmission of information to Jatin, a business house under the name "Universal Emporium" was set up, as a branch of Harry & Sons in Calcutta, which had been created for keeping contacts with revolutionaries abroad. Jatin, therefore, moved to a hideout outside Kaptipada village in the native state of Mayurbhanj, more than thirty miles away from Balasore.

In April 1915, after meeting with Jatin, Naren Bhattacharya (the future M. N. Roy) went to Batavia, to make a deal with the German authorities concerning financial aid and the supply of arms. Through the German consul, Naren met Theodore, brother of Karl Helfferich, who assured him that a cargo of arms and ammunition was already on its way, "to assist the Indians in a revolution".

A network of Czech and Slovak revolutionaries and emigrants had a role in the uncovering of Jatin's plans. Its members in the United States, headed by E. V. Voska, were, as Habsburg subjects, presumed to be German supporters, but were actually involved in spying on German and Austrian diplomats. Voska had begun working with Guy Gaunt, who headed Courtenay Bennett's intelligence network at the outbreak of the war and on learning of the plot from the members of the network in Europe, passed on the information to Gaunt and to Tomáš Masaryk who further passed on the information the Americans.

== Jatin's death ==
Jatin was informed of British action by Niren and was requested to leave his hiding place, but his insistence on taking Nirendranath (Niren) Dasgupta and Jyotish Pal with him delayed their departure by a few hours, by which time a large force of police (400 men) , headed by top British officers from Calcutta and Balasore, reinforced by the army unit from Chandabali in Bhadrak district, had reached the neighborhood. Jatin and his companions walked through the forests and hills of Mayurbhanj, and after two days reached Balasore Railway Station.

The police had announced a reward for the capture of five fleeing "bandits", so the local villagers were also in pursuit. With occasional skirmishes, the revolutionaries, running through jungles and marshy land in torrential rain, finally took up position on 9 September 1915 in an improvised trench in the undergrowth on a hillock at Chashakhand in Balasore. Chittapriya Ray Chaudhuri and his companions asked Jatin to leave and go to safety while they guarded the rear. Jatin, however, refused to leave them.

The contingent of Government forces approached them in a pincers movement. A gunfight ensued, lasting seventy-five minutes, between the five revolutionaries armed with Mauser pistols and a large number of police and army armed with modern rifles. The incident known as Battle of Balasore ended with an unrecorded number (25 as per local eye witnesses) of casualties on the Government side. On the other hand, revolutionary Chaudhuri died on the spot, Jatin and Jyotish Pal were seriously wounded, and Manoranjan Sengupta and Niren were captured after their ammunition ran out. Jatindranath Mukherjee died at the Balasore district hospital on 10 September 1915. Sengupta and Niren were hanged at Balasore district jail.

== Legacy ==
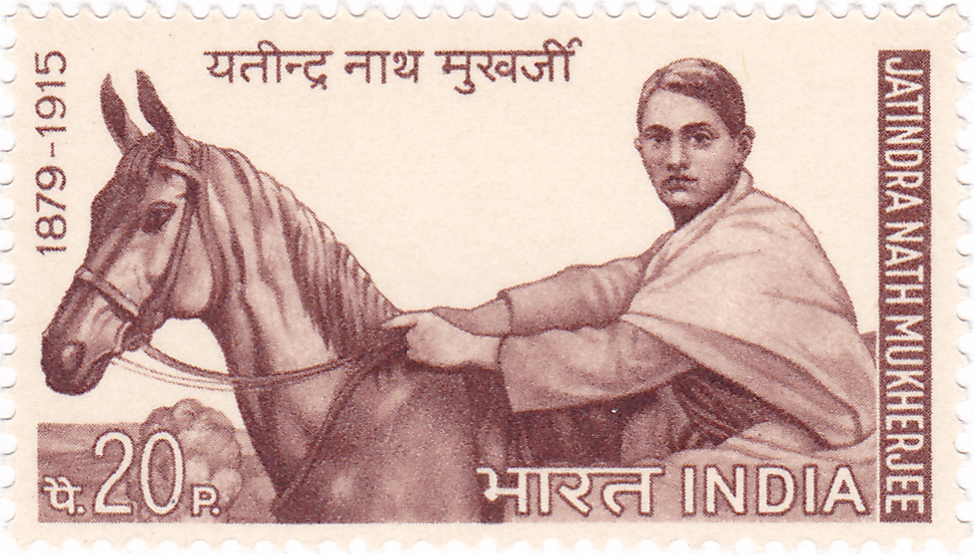
Bagha Jatin on a 1970 stamp of India

Jatin expressed his ideals in simple words: "Amra morbo, jagat jagbe" — "We will die, the world will awaken." It is corroborated in the tribute paid to Jatin by Charles Tegart, the Intelligence Chief and Police Commissioner of Bengal: "Though I had to do my duty, I have a great admiration for him. He died in an open fight." Later in life, Tegart admitted: "Their driving power (...) immense: if the army could be raised or the arms could reach an Indian port, the British would lose the War." Professor Tripathi analysed the added dimensions revealed by the Howrah Case proceedings: acquire arms locally and abroad; raise a guerrilla; create a rising with Indian soldiers; Jatin Mukherjee's action helped improve (especially economically) the people's status. "He had indeed an ambitious dream."

Informed about his death, M. N. Roy wrote: "I could not forget the injunction of the only man I ever obeyed almost blindly[...] Jatinda's heroic death [...] must be avenged. Only a year had passed since then. But in the meantime, I had come to realise that I admired Jatinda because he personified, perhaps without himself knowing it, the best of mankind. The corollary to that realisation was that Jatinda's death would be avenged if I worked for the ideal of establishing a social order in which the best in man could be manifest."

In 1925, Gandhi told Charles Tegart that Jatin, generally referred to as "Bagha Jatin" (translated as Tiger Jatin), was "a divine personality". Tegart himself is purported to have told his colleagues that if Jatin were an Englishman, then the English people would have built his statue next to Nelson's at Trafalgar Square. In a 1926 note to J. E. Francis of the India Office, he described Bengali revolutionaries as "the most selfless political workers in India".

The locality of Baghajatin in Kolkata has been named after him. Barbati Girls High School situated near the banks of the Budhabalanga River in Balasore town has a statue of Bagha Jatin as it was here the erstwhile Balasore district government hospital was housed and he died. Chashakhand, a place near Phuladi just about 15 km (9.3 mi) east of Balasore, has a park in his memorium as it was here he fought the British forces after crossing the Budhabalanga River which flows nearby.

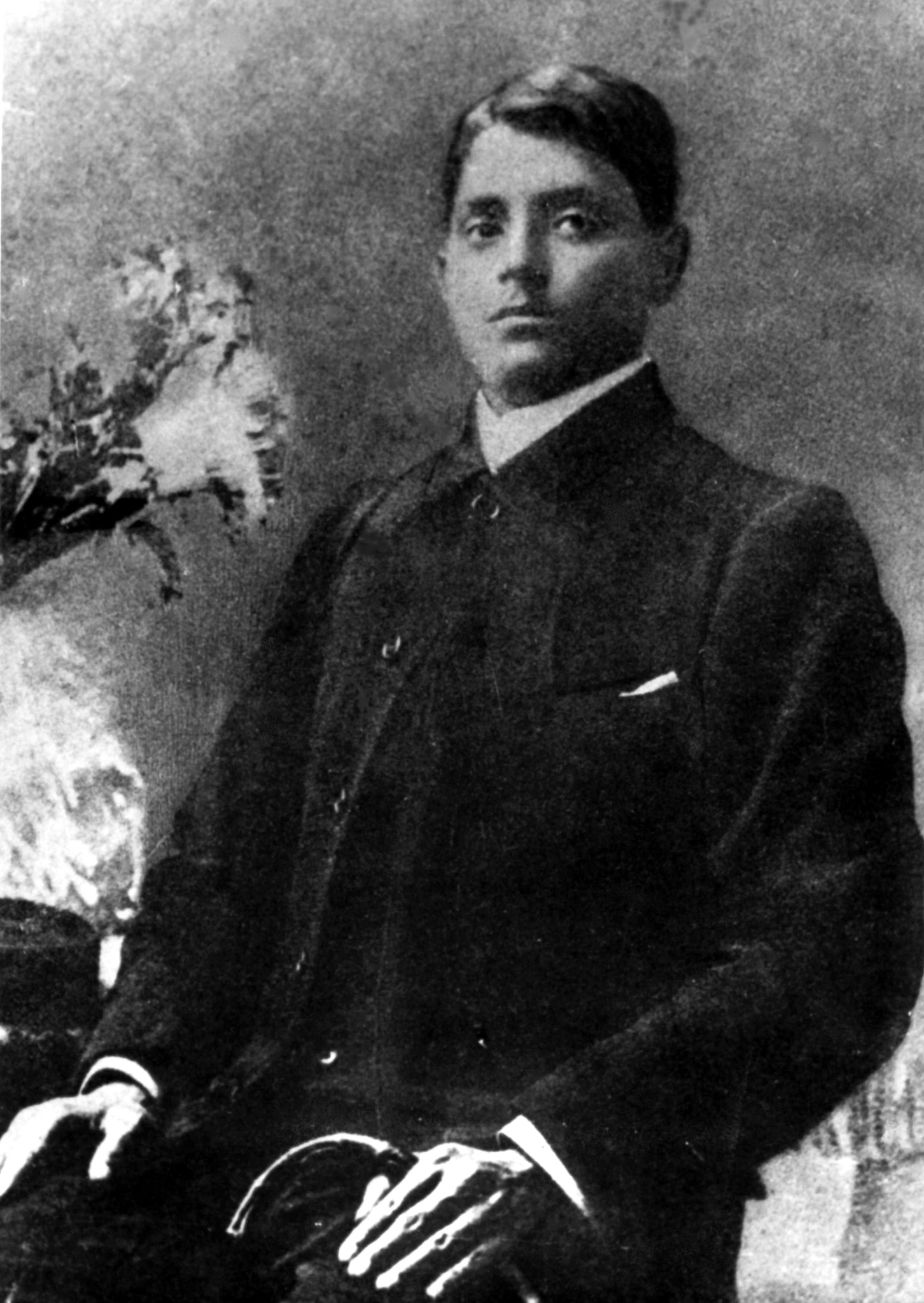
Jatindranath Mukherjee Bagha Jatin in Darjeeling 1903 photograph

== Photo gallery ==
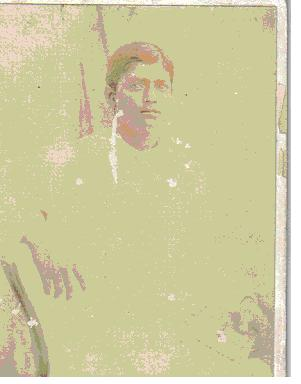
Jatin in 1895, shortly before joining the University of Calcutta

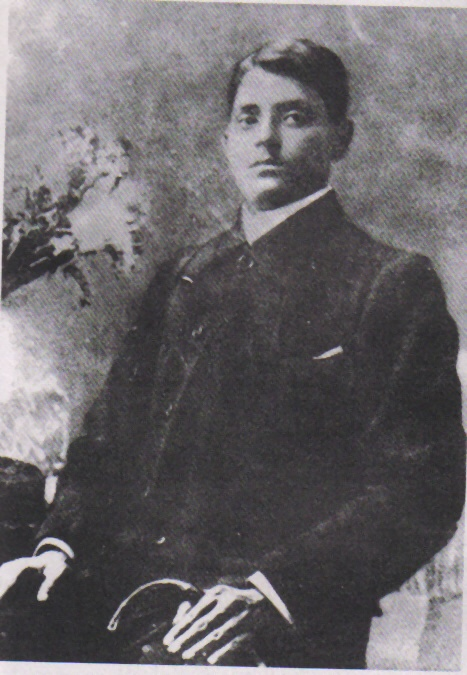
Jatin at the age of 24, in Darjeeling, 1903

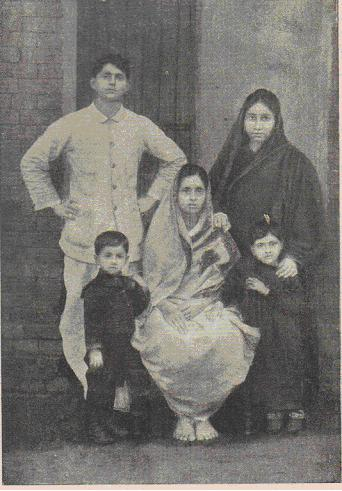
Jatin in 1912. Standing behind Didi Vinodebala (sitting) with his wife Indubala, elder son Tejen (left) and daughter Ashalata (right)

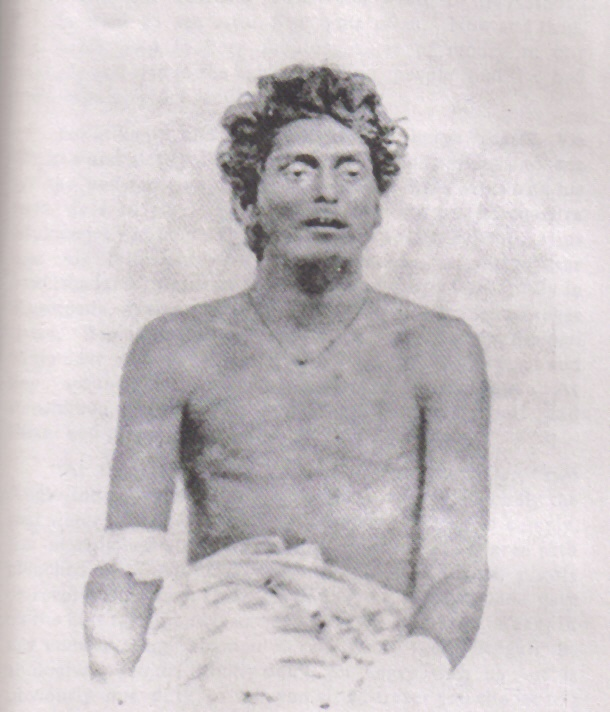
Bagha Jatin after the final battle. Balasore, 1915

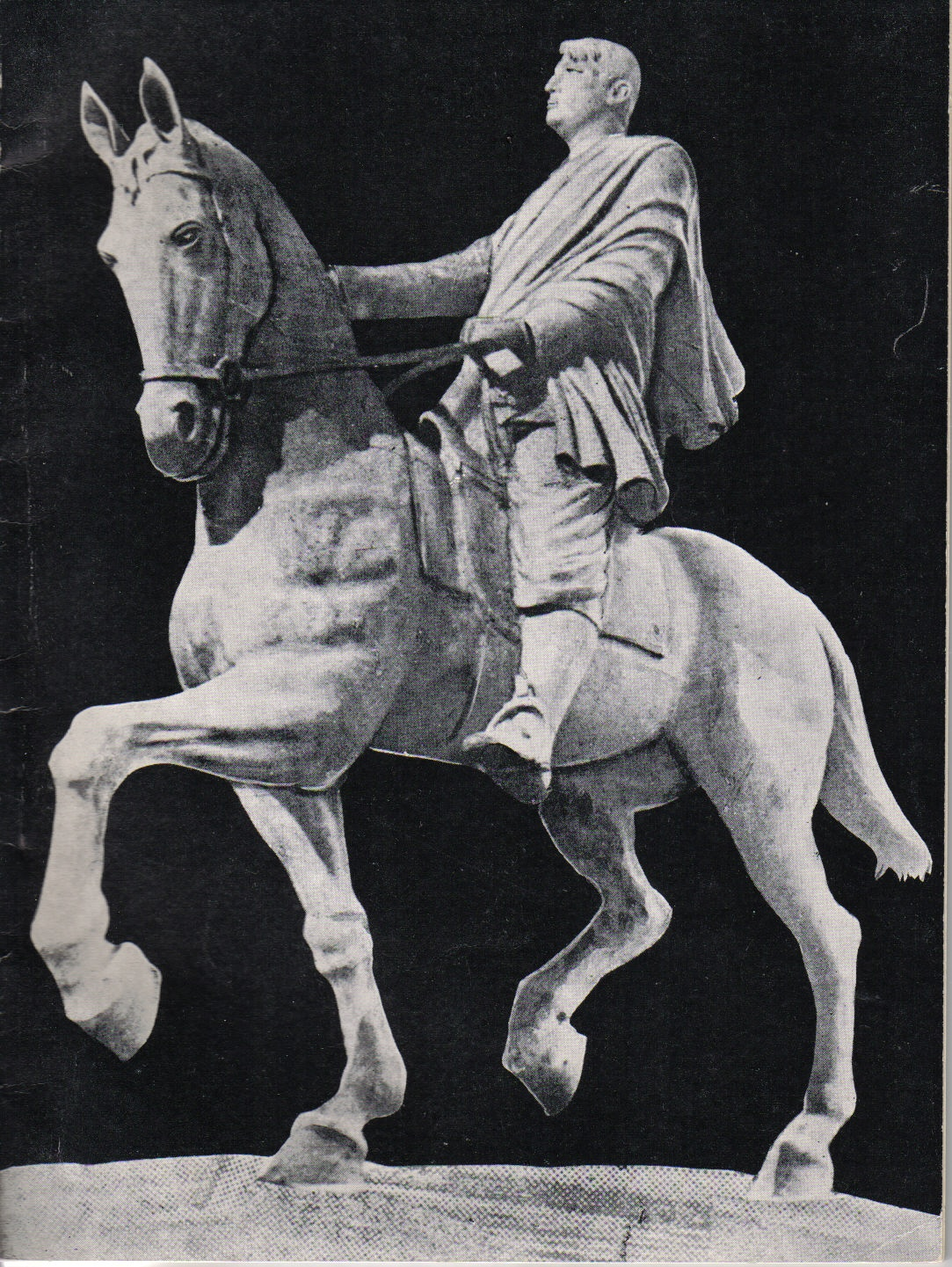
Statue of Bagha Jatin near Victoria Memorial, Kolkata

== In popular culture ==
- In 1958 a patriotic film named Bagha Jatin was released under the direction of Hiranmoy Sen.
- Indian film director Harisadhan Dasgupta made Bagha Jatin (1977 film), an Indian documentary film on the freedom fighter in 1977. It was produced by the government of India's Films Division.
- In 2023, Bagha Jatin, a film directed by Arun Roy, had been released. Dev played the titular role in the film. Music of the film was directed by Nilayan Chatterjee.
- He was featured in The Revolutionaries (TV series) in 2026.

== Cited sources ==
- Mukhopadhyay, Jadugopal (1982). Biplabi jîbaner smriti.
- Guha, Arun Chandra (1971). First spark of revolution: the early phase of India's struggle for independence, 1900–1920. Orient Longman. ISBN 9780883860380.
- Mukherjee, Uma (1966). Two Great Indian Revolutionaries (1st ed.). Firma K. L. Mukhopadhyay.
- Roy, M. N. (1964) [First published 1960]. M.N. Roy's Memoirs. Allied Publisher.
- Samanta, A.K., ed. (1995). Terrorism in Bengal. Government of West Bengal, Calcutta.
