= 8/12 Binay Badal Dinesh =

2022 Indian Bengali film

- Directed by: Arun Roy
- Produced by: Kan Singh Sodha
- Starring: Kinjal Nanda; Arna Mukhopadhyay; Remo
- Cinematography: Gopi Bhagat
- Edited by: Sanglap Bhowmik
- Music by: Soumya Rit
- Production companies: KSS Productions and Entertainment
- Release date: 26 January 2022
- Running time: 98 minutes
- Country: India
- Language: Bengali

8/12 Binay Badal Dinesh is a 2022 Bengali-language historical drama film directed by Arun Roy, and produced by Kan Singh Sodha. It is based on the historical attack on Writers' Building by three Bengal Volunteers in 1930. The film was released on 26 January 2022 under the banner of KSS Productions and Entertainment.

== Plot ==
The plot is based on the life and contribution of Binoy, Badal and Dinesh, revolutionary trio. On 8 December 1930 they entered into the Writers' Building, British India Secretariat of Bengal at B. B. D. Bagh to assassinate the infamous British Inspector General N.S. Simpson.

== Cast ==
- Kinjal Nanda as Benoy Basu
- Arna Mukhopadhyay as Badal Gupta
- Remo as Dinesh Gupta
- Saswata Chatterjee
- Kharaj Mukherjee
- Anuska Chakraborty
- Gulshanara Khatun as Kamala
- Debraj Mukherjee
- Sankar Debnath
- Bipasha Saha

== Soundtrack ==
8/12 Binay Badal Dinesh

Soundtrack album by Soumya Rit
- Released: 2022
- Genre: Film soundtrack
- Length: 14:11
- Language: Bengali
- Label: KSS Productions And Entertainment

The soundtrack album is composed and written by Soumya Rit

Track listing
No.	Title	Singer(s)	Length
1.	"Binay Badal Dinesh"	Rupam Islam	3:14
2.	"Swadhin Hobe Desh"	Arijit Singh	5:26
3.	"Ebarer Moto Biday"	Mekhla Dasgupta	5:31
Total length:			14:11

== Reception ==
In their review Cinestaan gave the film three stars from five, praising the direction, writing, and cinematic finesse while criticising the overpowering heavy metal soundtrack and a few over-the top performances. The reviewer considered: "Gopi Bhagat’s experienced camerawork and editor Sanglap Bhowmick’s fine trimming of the scenes make 8/12 one of the better Bengali period films made in recent times." Jani News gave the film a positive review, praising the direction, acting and cinematography. The reviewer stated: "The way director Arun Roy presents the forty minutes of armed struggle in a very restrained manner, with beautiful choreography in just 12/13 minutes, has probably never been seen in a Bengali film before." Ananda Bazaar also gave a positive review, praising the acting and direction while criticising the music and pacing of the story.
