= Revolutionary movement for Indian independence =

Violent factions of the movement

The Revolutionary movement for Indian Independence was part of the Indian independence movement comprising the actions of violent underground revolutionary factions. Groups believing in armed revolution against the ruling British fall into this category, as opposed to the generally peaceful civil disobedience movement spearheaded by Mahatma Gandhi.

The revolutionary groups were mainly concentrated in Bengal, Bombay, Bihar, the United Provinces and Punjab. More groups were scattered across India.

== Beginnings ==
Apart from a few stray incidents, the armed rebellion against the British rulers was not organized before the beginning of the 20th century. The revolutionary philosophies and movement made their presence felt during the 1905 partition of Bengal. Arguably, the initial steps to organise the revolutionaries were taken by Aurobindo Ghosh, his brother Barin Ghosh, Bhupendranath Datta, Lal Bal Pal and Subodh Chandra Mullick, when they formed the Jugantar party in April 1906. Jugantar was created as an inner circle of the Anushilan Samiti, which was already present in Bengal, mainly as a fitness club. The notion of self-improvement of the public along lines of physical, intellectual and spiritual development followed from ideas propagated by thinkers such as Bankim Chandra Chattopadhyay, Swami Vivekananda and Sri Aurobindo who were rooted in Shakta Hinduism.

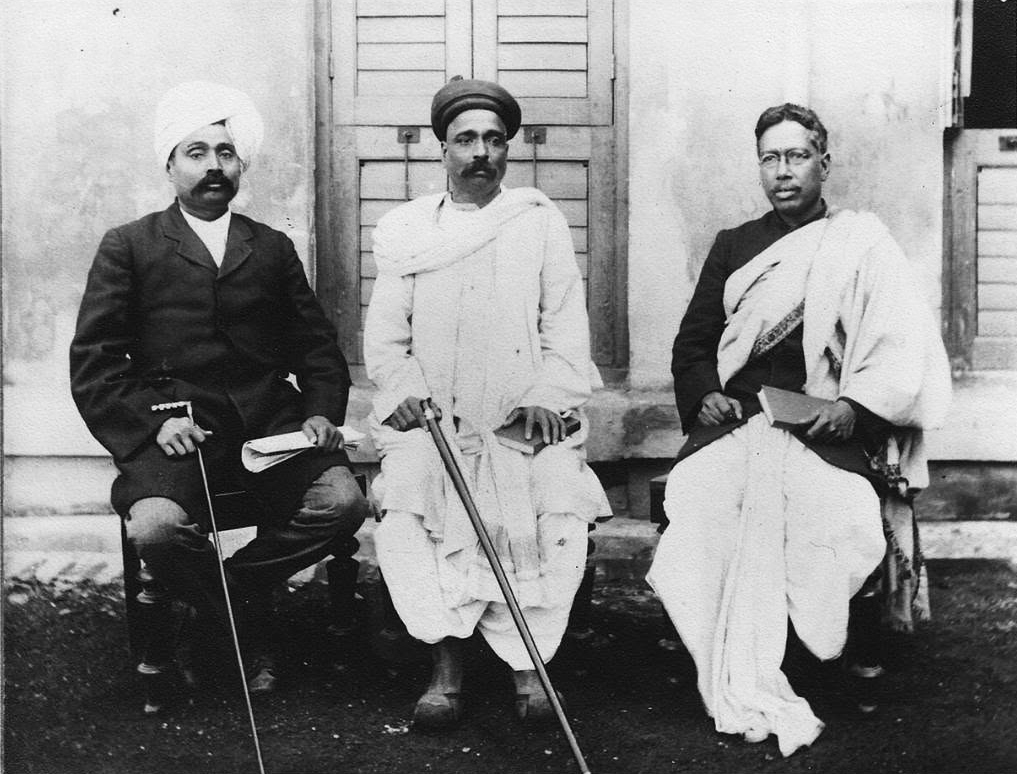
Lala Lajpat Rai of Punjab, Bal Gangadhar Tilak of Bombay, and Bipin Chandra Pal of Bengal, the triumvirate popularly known as Lal Bal Pal, changed the political discourse of the Indian independence movement.

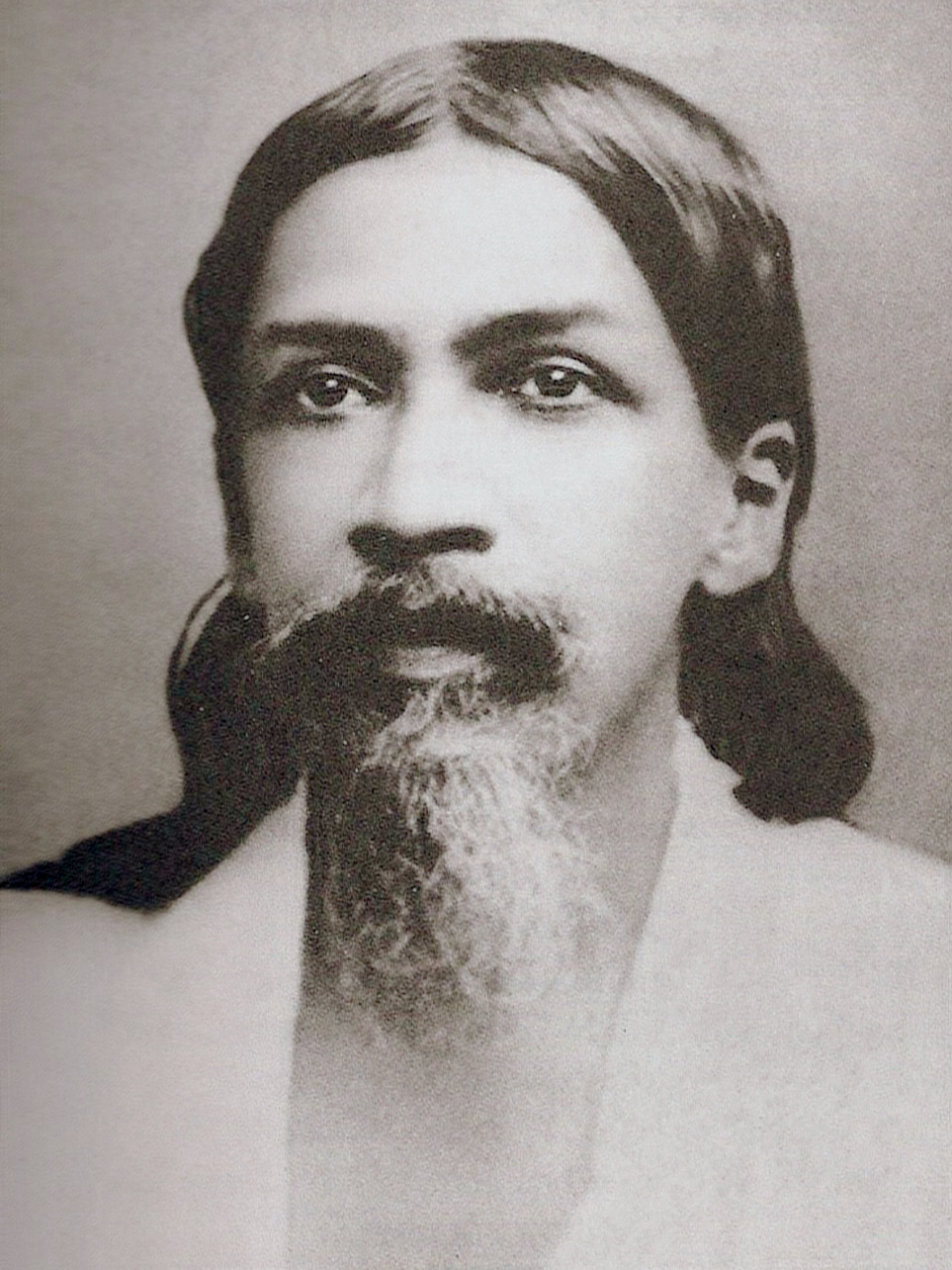
Aurobindo Ghosh was one of the founding members of Jugantar, as well as being involved with nationalist politics in the Indian National Congress and the nascent revolutionary movement in Bengal with the Anushilan Samiti.

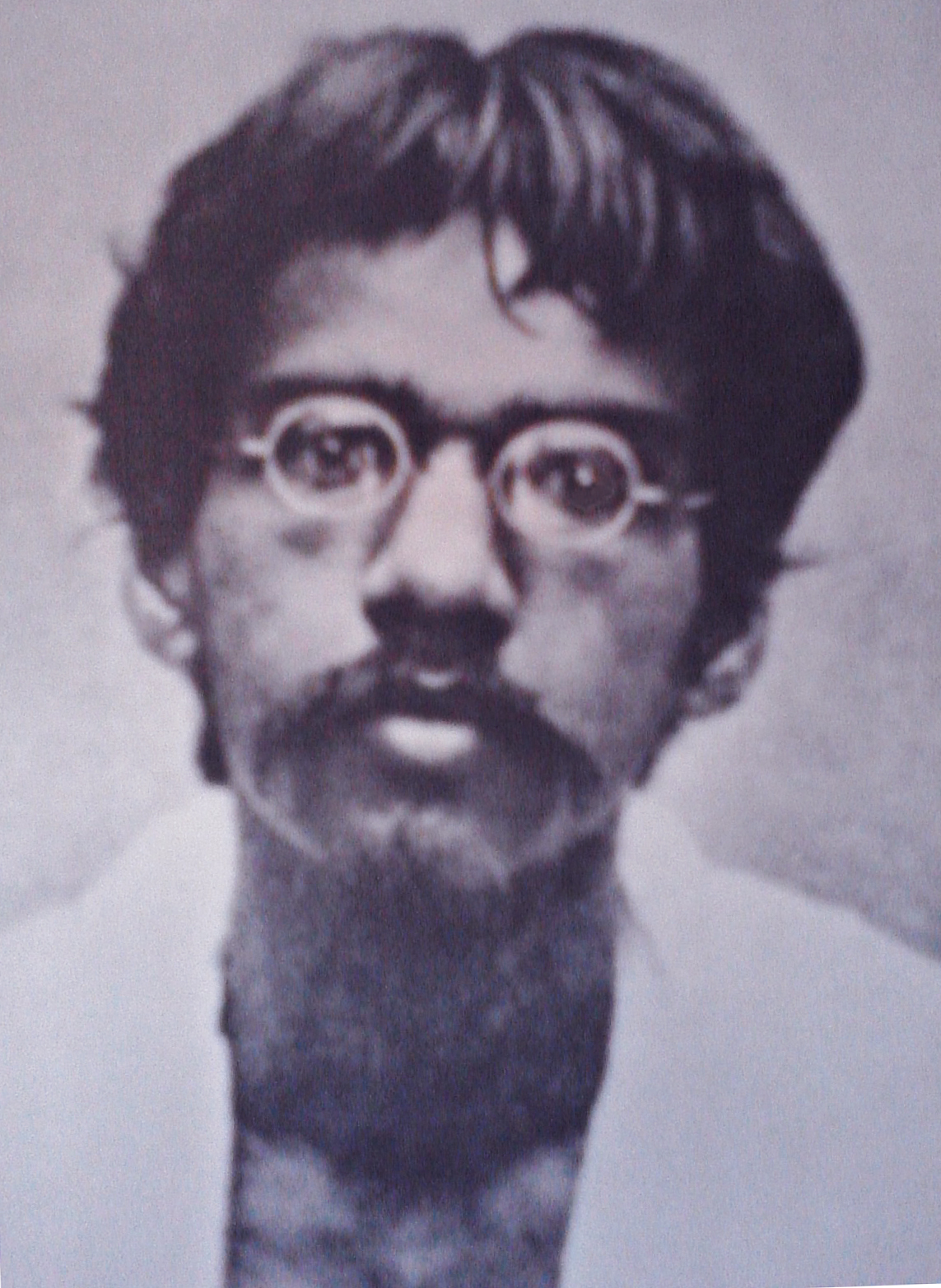
Barindra Kumar Ghosh was one of the founding members of Jugantar and the younger brother of Sri Aurobindo.

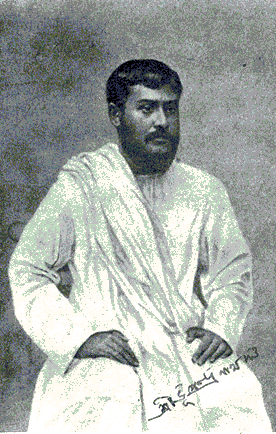
Bhupendranath Datta was an Indian revolutionary who was privy to the Indo-German Conspiracy.

== Andaman Island ==
=== Communist Consolidation ===
Communist Consolidation was an organization formed in Cellular Jail and was founded by Hare Krishna Konar along with 39 other inmates. This organization was formed after the freedom fighters started studying Communism, Socialism and Marxism. In 1937 the political prisoners and the members of the Communist Consolidation of Cellular Jail started feeling that World War II was imminent and thought that before the war started they should get back to the mainland country to be with their people and take an active part in the upheaval that was coming, so the prisoners started a hunger strike against the British government. This hunger strike was led by the founder of Communist Consolidation Hare Krishna Konar, some notable strikers were Batukeshwar Dutt (associated with Bhagat Singh), Sachindra Nath Sanyal (founder of Hindustan Socialist Republican Association), Ganesh Ghosh (member of Chittagong armoury raid) and many others.

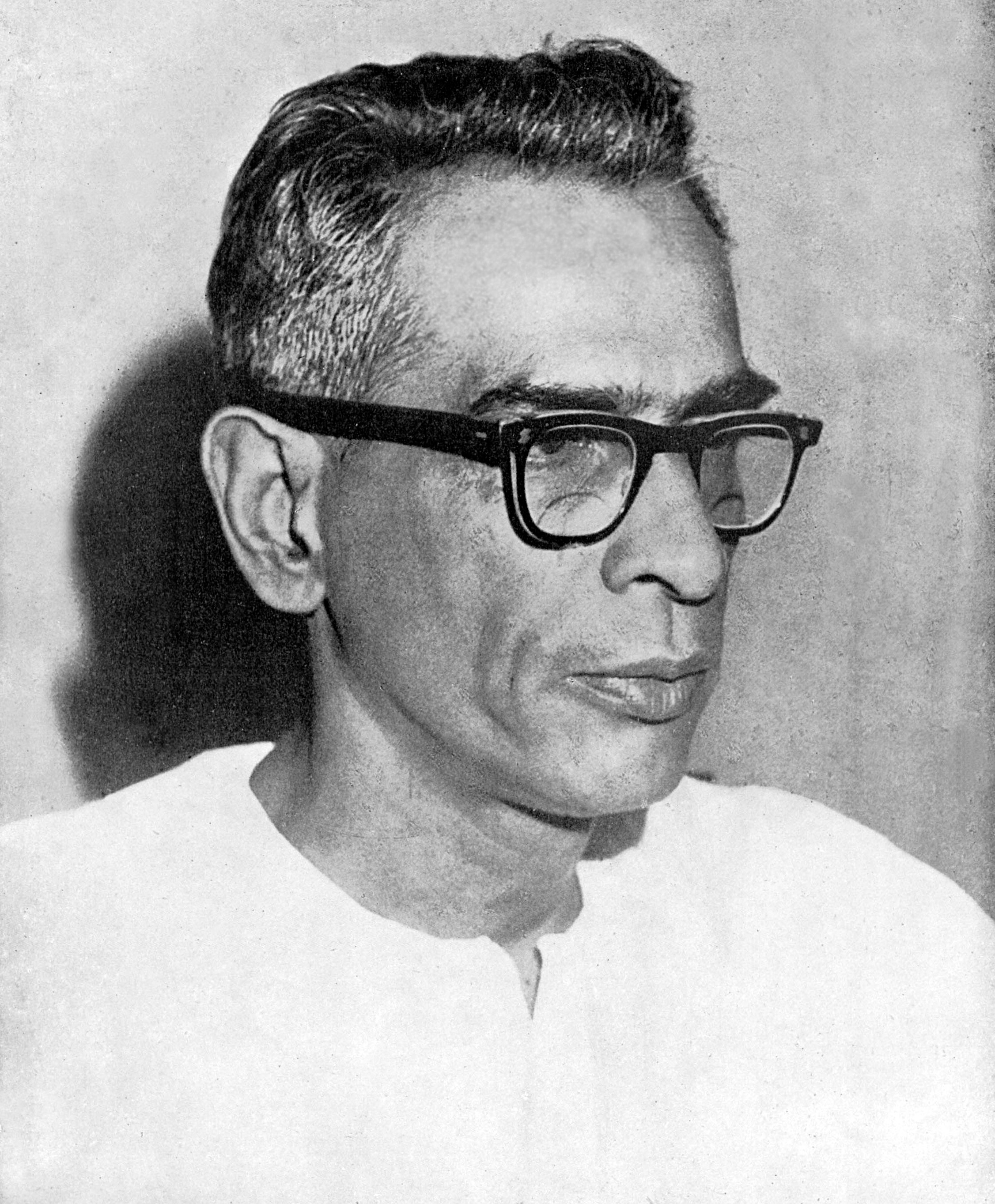
Hare Krishna Konar was the member of Jugantar party and the founder of Communist Consolidation in Cellular Jail, later founding member of Communist Party of India (Marxist).

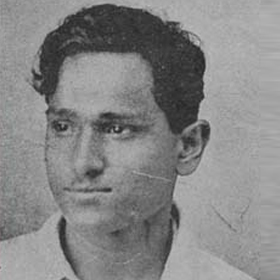
Batukeshwar Dutt was a member of Hindustan Socialist Republican Association and member of Communist Consolidation.

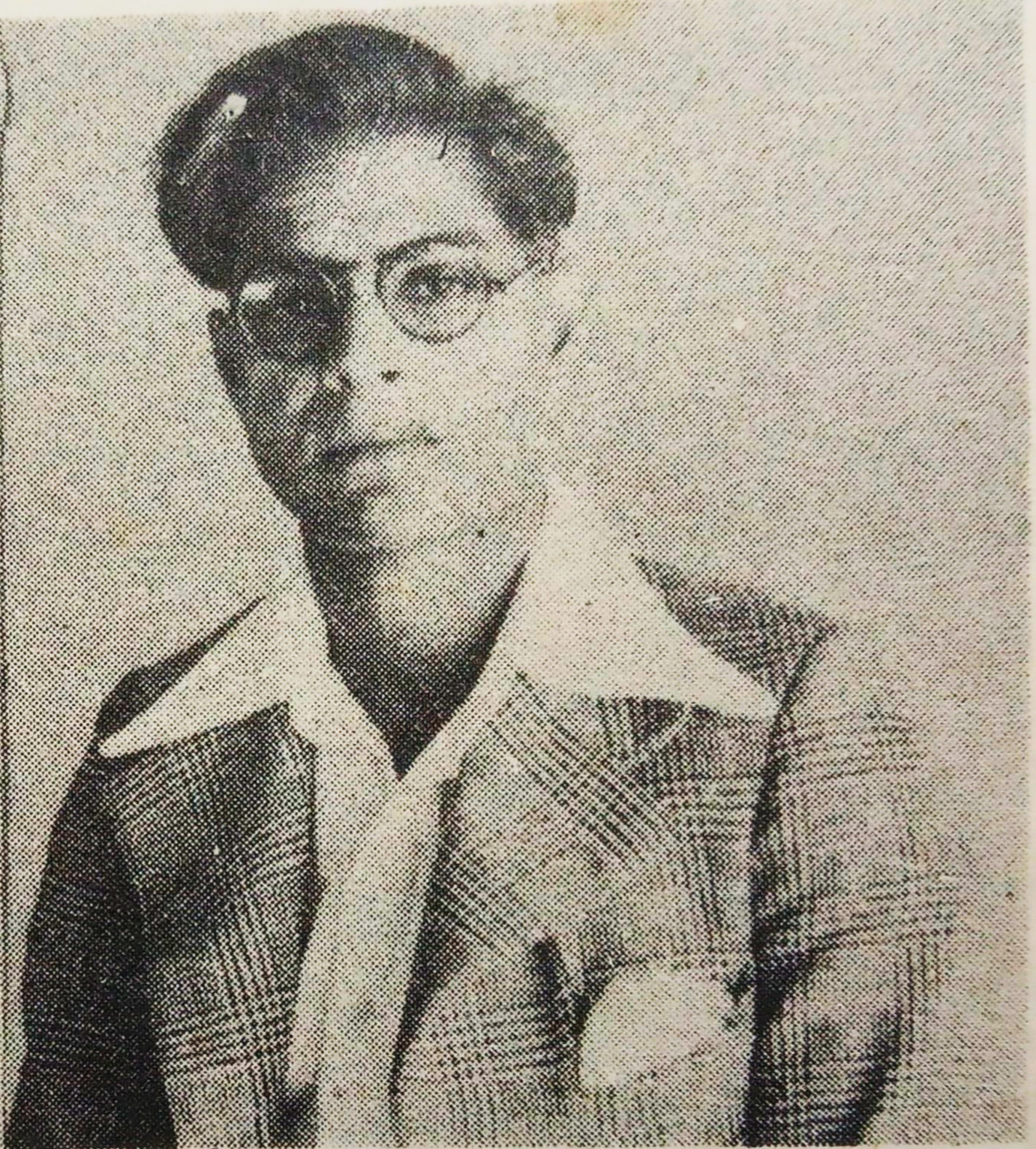
Shiv Verma was associated with Bhagat Singh and member of Communist Consolidation in Cellular Jail.

== Andhra Pradesh ==
Uyyalawada Narasimha Reddy (died 22 February 1847) was the son of a former Indian Telugu polygar who was at the heart of a rebellion in 1846, when 5000 peasants rose up against the British East India Company (EIC) in Kurnool district, Rayalaseema Region of Andhra Pradesh. They were protesting changes to the traditional agrarian system the British introduced in the first half of the nineteenth century. Those changes, which included the introduction of the ryotwari system and other attempts to maximize revenue, impacted lower-status cultivators by depleting their crops and leaving them impoverished.

Alluri Sitarama Raju (4 July 1897 or 1898 – 7 May 1924) was an Indian revolutionary who waged an armed rebellion against the British colonial rule in India. Born in present-day Andhra Pradesh, he was involved in opposing the British in response to the 1882 Madras Forest Act that effectively restricted the free movement of adivasis in their forest habitats and prevented them from practicing their traditional form of agriculture called 'podu', which threatened their very way of life.

== Bengal ==
=== Anushilan Samiti ===
The Greatest Influential Indian Freedom Fighters from Bengal during Indian Independence Movement (1758–1947)

- Dhaka district (now in Bangladesh)
  - Shaheed (Age: 22) Benoy Basu (Benoy of Benoy-Badal-Dinesh Trio)
  - Shaheed (Age: 18) Badal Gupta (Badal of Benoy-Badal-Dinesh Trio)
  - Shaheed (Age: 19) Dinesh Gupta (Dinesh of Benoy-Badal-Dinesh Trio)

- Midnapore district (now in West Bengal)
  - Shaheed (Age: 18) Khudiram Bose (Khudiram of Khudiram-Prafulla Duo)
  - Hemchandra Kanungo (one of the founding fathers of Anushilan Samiti in Midnapore)
  - Shaheed (Age: 21) Anath Bondhu Panja (Member of Bengal Volunteers)
  - Shaheed (Age: 17) Mrigendra Dutta (Member of Bengal Volunteers)
  - Shaheed (Age: 19) Pradyot Kumar Bhattacharya (Member of Bengal Volunteers)

- Chittagong district (now in Bangladesh)
  - Shaheed Masterda Surya Sen
  - Shaheed (Age: 21) Pritilata Waddedar

- 24 Parganas district (now in West Bengal)
  - Shaheed (Age: 24) Jatin Das
  - Netaji Subhas Chandra Bose (Parakram Diwas or Day of Valour is observed every year on January 23 to commemorate his birth anniversary)

- Burdwan district (now in West Bengal)
  - Rashbehari Bose
  - Batukeshwar Dutta
  - Hare Krishna Konar
- Bogra district (now in Bangladesh)
  - Shaheed (Age: 19) Prafulla Chaki (Prafulla of Khudiram-Prafulla Duo)

- Nadia district (now in Kushtia district of Bangladesh)
  - Shaheed Baghajatin Mukherjee

- Hooghly district (now in West Bengal)
  - Rishi Aurobinda Ghosh

- Sylhet district (now in Bangladesh)
  - Bipin Chandra Pal (Pal of Lal-Bal-Pal Trio, Father of Revolutionary Thoughts in India)

- Faridpur district (now in Bangladesh)
  - Rashtraguru Surendranath Banerjee

Established by Pramathanath Mitra, it became one of the most organized revolutionary associations, especially in eastern Bengal, where the Dhaka Anushilan Samiti had several branches and carried out major activities. Jugantar was initially formed by an inner circle of the Kolkata Anushilan Samiti. In the 1920s, the Kolkata faction supported Gandhi in the Non-Cooperation Movement and many of the leaders held high posts in Congress. The Anushilan Samati had over five hundred branches. Indians living in America and Canada had established the Ghadar Party.

=== Jugantar ===
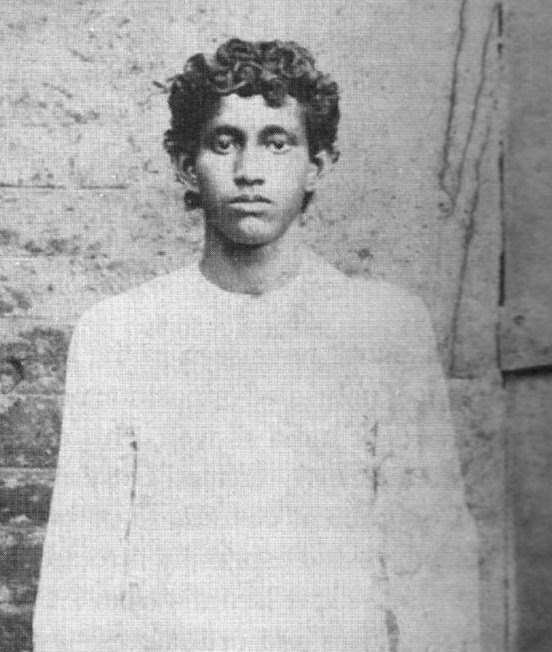
Khudiram Bose was one of the youngest Indian revolutionaries tried and executed by the British.

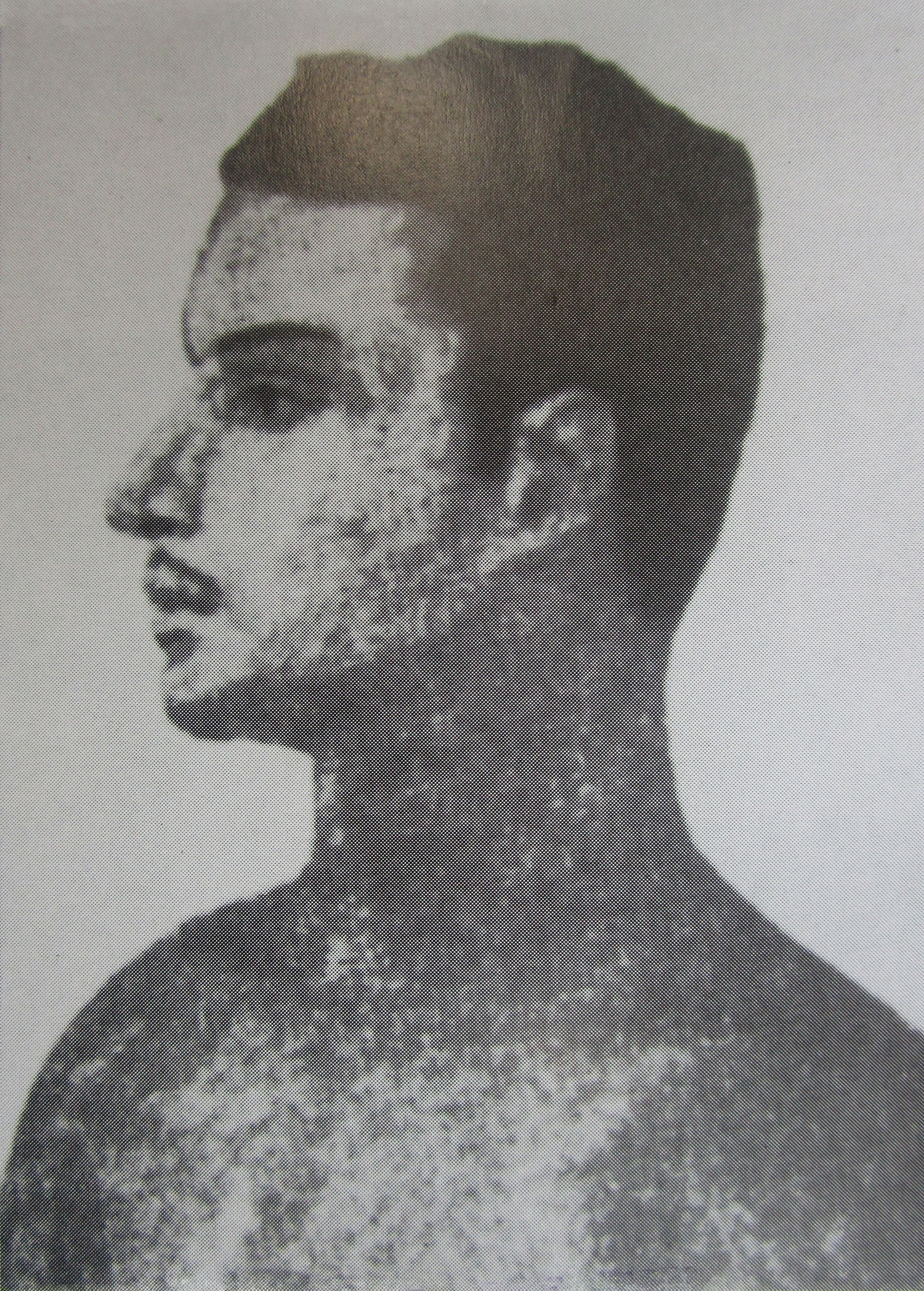
Prafulla Chaki, was associated with the Jugantar. He carried out assassinations against British colonial officials in an attempt to secure Indian independence.

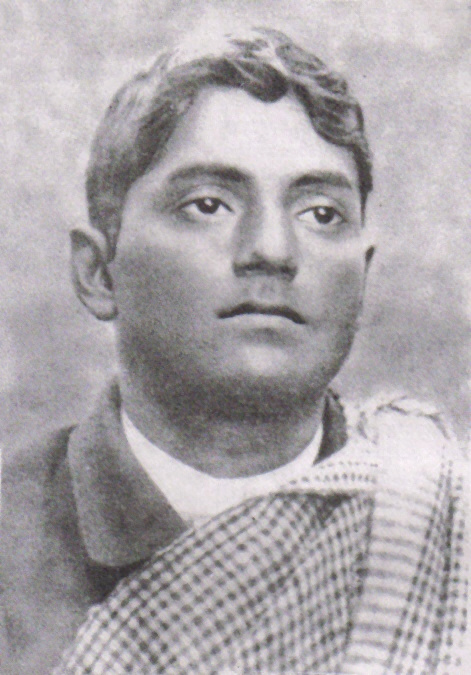
Jatindranath Mukherjee (Bagha Jatin) in 1910; was the principal leader of the Jugantar Party, which was the central association of revolutionary Indian freedom fighters in Bengal.

Barin Ghosh was the main leader. Along with 21 revolutionaries including Bagha Jatin, he started to collect arms and explosives and manufactured bombs. The headquarters of Jugantar was located at 93/a Bowbazar Street, Kolkata.

Some senior members of the group were sent abroad for political and military training. One of them, Hemchandra Kanungo, obtained his training in Paris. After returning to Kolkata he set up a combined religious school and bomb factory at a garden house in the Maniktala suburb of Calcutta. However, the attempted murder of district Judge Kingsford of Muzaffarpur by Khudiram Bose and Prafulla Chaki on 30 April 1908 initiated a police investigation that led to the arrest of many of the revolutionaries.

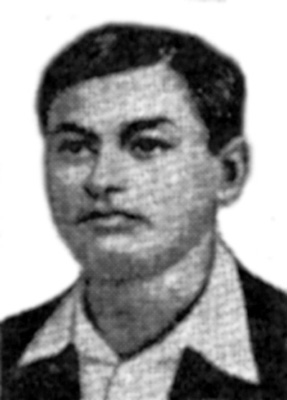
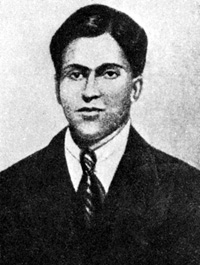
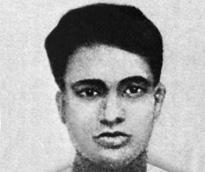
Benoy Basu, Badal Gupta, and Dinesh Gupta were noted for launching an attack on the Secretariat Building – the Writers' Building in the Dalhousie Square in Kolkata.

Bagha Jatin was one of the top leaders in Jugantar. He was arrested, along with several other leaders, in connection with the Howrah-Sibpur Conspiracy case. They were tried for treason, the charge being that they had incited various regiments of the army against the ruler.

Jugantar, along with other revolutionary groups, aided by Indians abroad, planned an armed revolt against the British rulers during the First World War. This plan largely depended on the clandestine landing of German arms and ammunitions on the Indian coast. This plan came to be known as the Indo-German Plot. However, the planned revolt did not materialise.

After the First World War, Jugantar supported Gandhi in the Non-Cooperation Movement and many of their leaders were in the Congress. Still, the group continued its revolutionary activities, a notable event being the Chittagong armoury raid.

Benoy Basu, Badal Gupta and Dinesh Gupta, who are noted for launching an attack on the Secretariat Building – the Writers' Building in the Dalhousie Square in Kolkata, were Jugantar members.

== Uttar Pradesh ==
=== Hindustan Socialist Republican Association ===
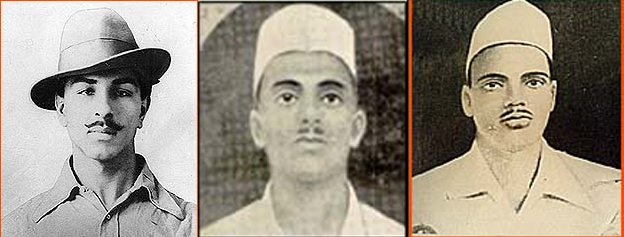
Bhagat Singh (left), Sukhdev (center), and Rajguru (right) are considered among the most influential revolutionaries of the Indian independence movement.

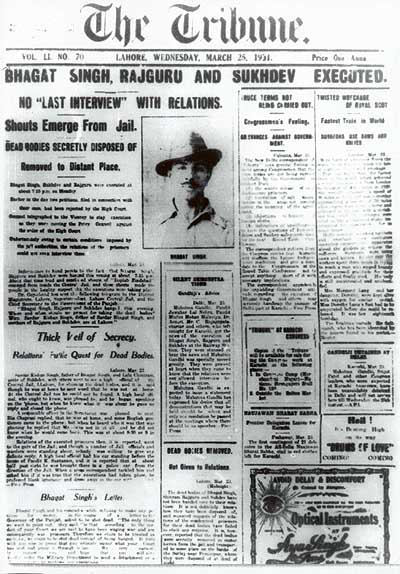
Front page of the Tribune (25 March 1931), reporting the execution of Bhagat Singh, Rajguru and Sukhdev by the British

The Hindustan Republican Association (HRA) was established in October 1924 in Kanpur, Uttar Pradesh by revolutionaries like Ramprasad Bismil, Jogesh Chatterjee, Chandrashekhar Azad, Yogendra Shukla and Sachindranath Sanyal. The aim of the party was to organise armed revolution to end the colonial rule and establish a Federal Republic of the United States of India. The Kakori train robbery was a notable act of this group. The Kakori case led to the hanging of Ashfaqullah Khan, Ramprasad Bismil, Roshan Singh, Rajendra Lahiri. The Kakori case was a major setback for the group. However, the group was soon reorganised under the leadership of Chandrashekhar Azad and with members like Bhagat Singh, Bhagwati Charan Vohra and Sukhdev on 8 and 9 September 1928– and the group was now christened Hindustan Socialist Republican Association (HSRA).

In Lahore on 17 December 1928, Bhagat Singh, Azad and Rajguru assassinated Saunders, a police official involved in deadly lathi-charge on Lala Lajpat Rai. Bhagat Singh and Batukeshwar Dutt threw a bomb inside the Central Legislative Assembly. The Assembly Bomb Case trial followed. Bhagat Singh, Sukhdev Thapar and Shivaram Rajguru were hanged on 23 March 1931.

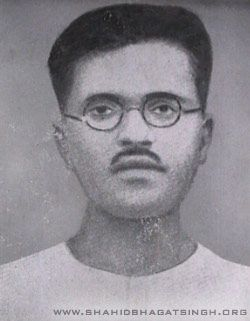
Bhagwati Charan Vohra died in Lahore on 28 May 1930 while testing a bomb on the banks of the River Ravi.

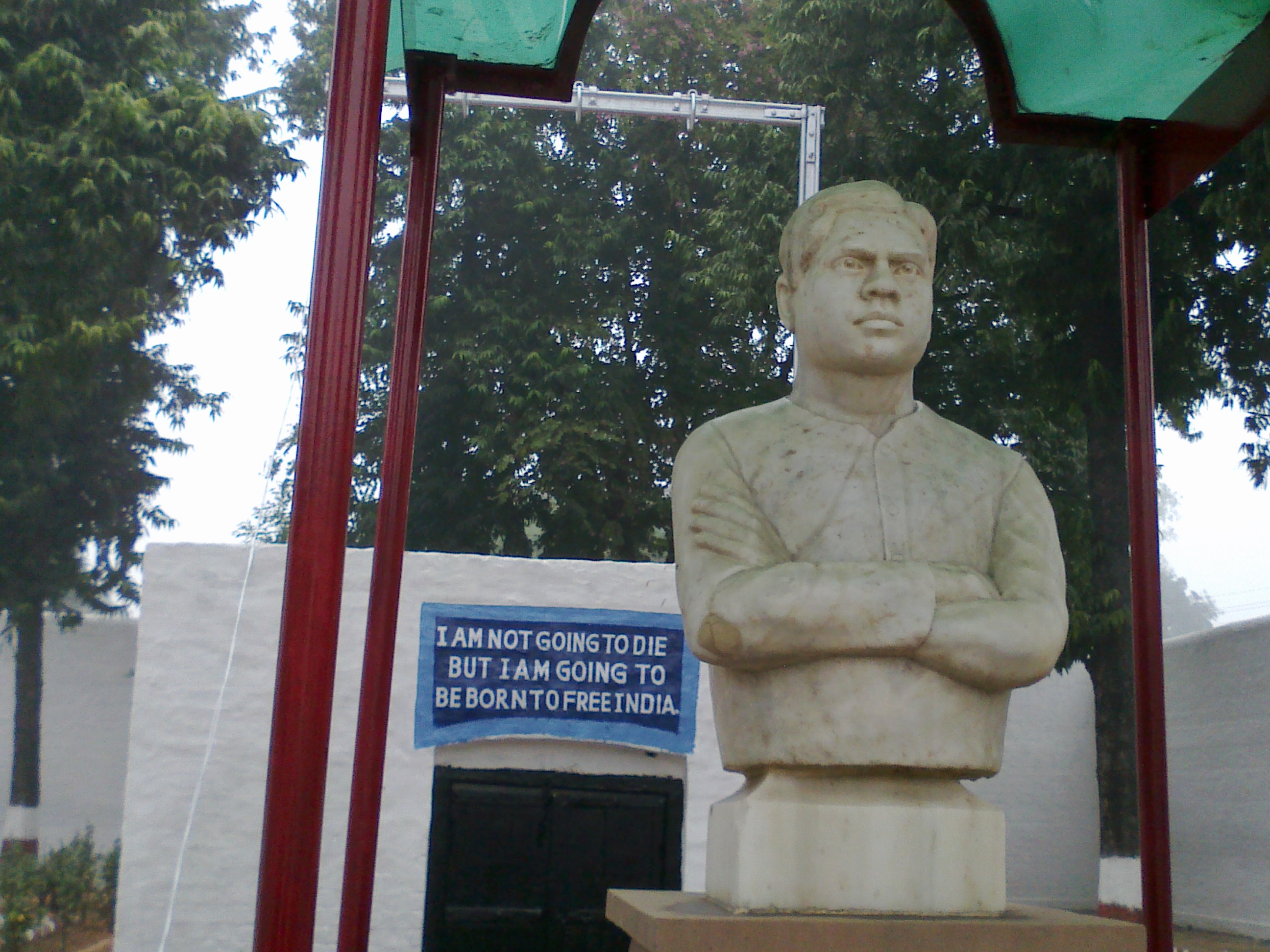
Rajendra Lahiri was the mastermind behind Kakori conspiracy and Dakshineshwar bombing.

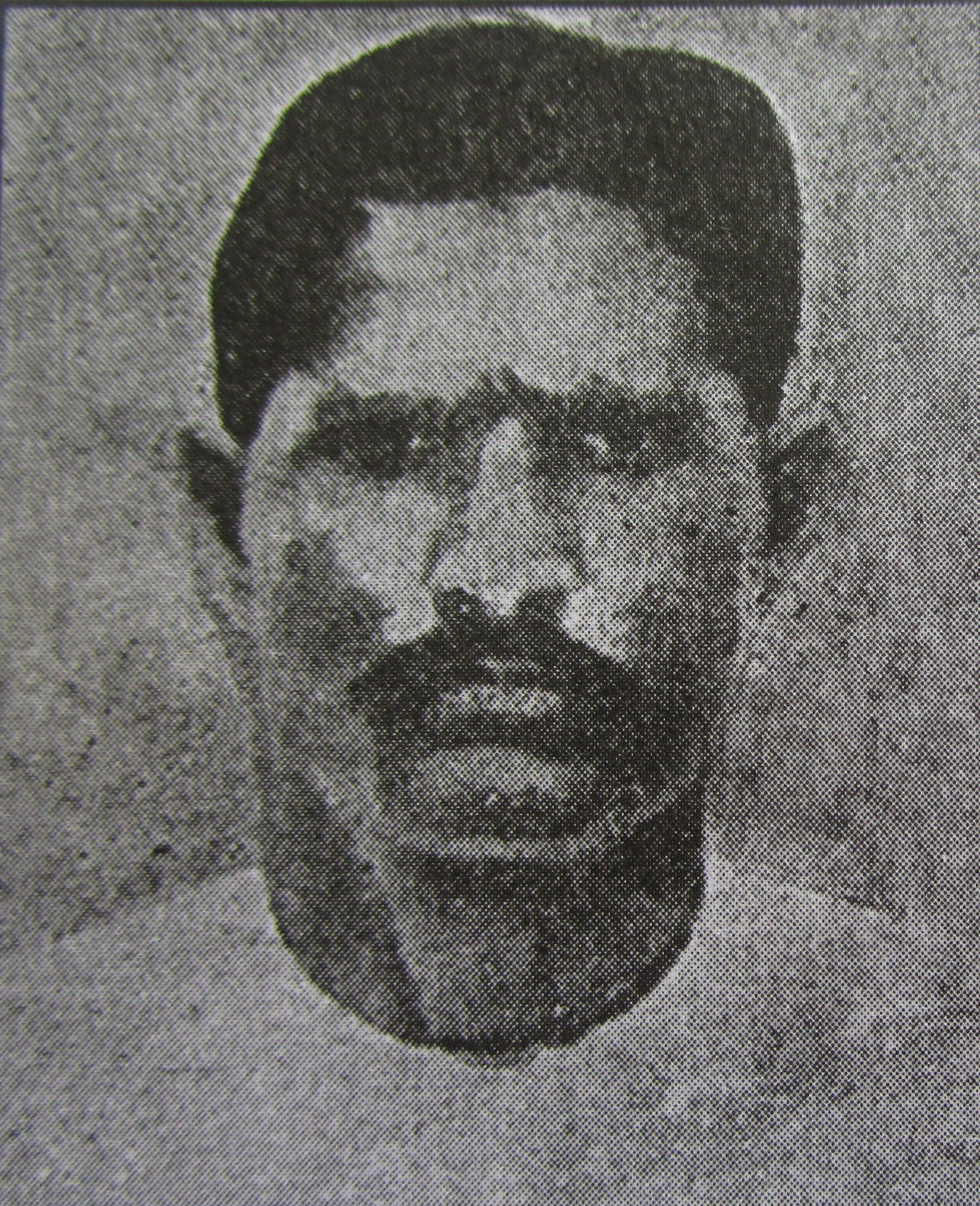
Roshan Singh was sentenced to death, along with Pandit Ram Prasad Bismil, Ashfaqulla Khan and Rajendra Lahiri.

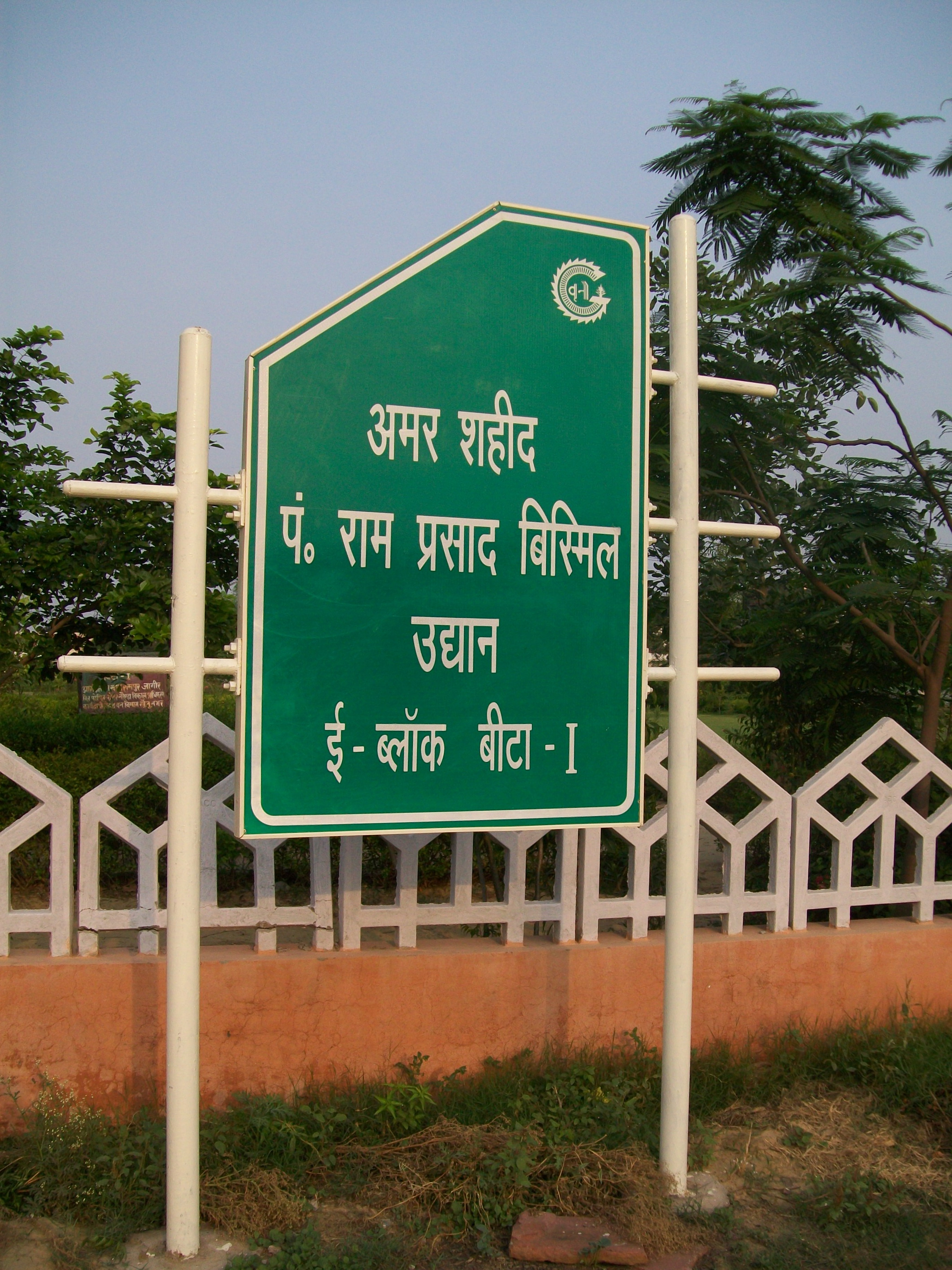
Ram Prasad Bismil Udyan (Park) in Greater Noida was dedicated to Ram Prasad Bismil, who participated in Manipuri conspiracy of 1918, and the Kakori conspiracy of 1925, and struggled against British colonial rule.

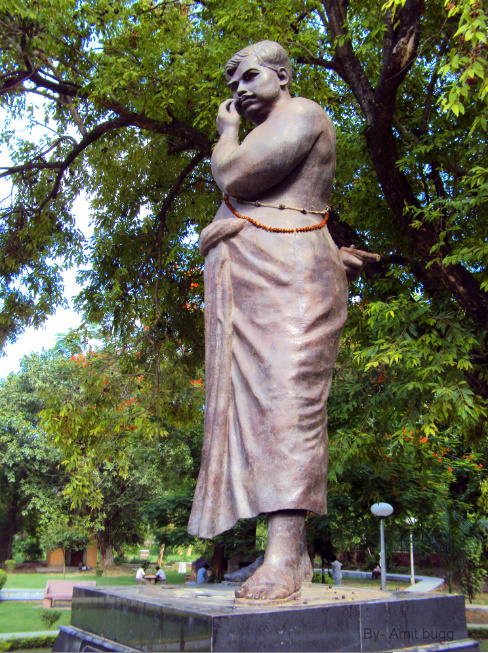
Chandra Shekhar Azad reorganised the Hindustan Republican Association under its new name of Hindustan Socialist Republican Army (HSRA) after the death of its founder, Ram Prasad Bismil.

== Maharashtra ==
=== Abhinav Bharat Secret Society ===
The Abhinav Bharat Society (Young India Society) was a secret society founded by Vinayak Damodar Savarkar and his brother Ganesh Damodar Savarkar in 1904. Initially founded at Nasik as "Mitra Mela" when Vinayak Savarkar was still a student of Fergusson College at Pune, the society grew to include several hundred revolutionaries and political activists with branches in various parts of India, extending to London after Savarkar went to study law. It carried out a few assassinations of British officials, after which the Savarkar brothers were convicted and imprisoned. The society was formally disbanded in 1952.

Savarkar's revolutionary propaganda led to the assassination of Lt. Col. William Curzon-Wyllie, the political aide-de-camp to the Secretary of State for India, by Madanlal Dhingra on the evening of 1 July 1909, at a meeting of Indian students in the Imperial Institute in London. Dhingra was arrested and later tried and executed. A. M. T. Jackson, the district magistrate of Nasik, was assassinated in India by Anant Laxman Kanhare in 1909 in the historic "Nasik Conspiracy Case".

The investigation into the Jackson assassination revealed the existence of the Abhinav Bharat Society and the role of the Savarkar brothers in leading it. Vinayak Savarkar was found to have dispatched twenty Browning pistols to India, one of which was used in the Jackson assassination. He was charged in the Jackson murder and sentenced to "transportation" for life. Savarkar was imprisoned in the Cellular Jail in the Andaman Islands in 1910.

=== Kotwal Dasta ===
Veer Bhai Kotwal alias Veer Bhai Kotwal during Quit India Movement formed group of underground mercenaries called "Kotwal Dasta", a parallel government in the Karjat taluka of Thane district. They were about 50 in numbers including farmers and voluntary school teachers. They decided to cut down the electric pylons supplying electricity to Mumbai city. From September 1942 through November 1942 they felled 11 pylons, paralyzing the industries and railways.

== South India ==
The uprising against the British was evidenced at Halagali (Mudhol taluk of Bagalkot district). The prince of Mudhol, Ghorpade, had accepted British overlordship. But the Bedas (hunters), a martial community, were seething with dissatisfaction under the new dispensation. The British proclaimed the Disarming Act of 1857 whereby men possessing firearms had to register them and secure a license before 10 November 1857. Babaji Nimbalkar, a soldier thrown out of job from Satara Court, had advised these people not to lose their hereditary right to own arms.

One of the leaders of the Bedas, Jadgia, was invited by the administrator at Mudhol and was persuaded to secure a license on 11 November, though Jadgia had not asked for it. The administrator's expectation that others would follow Jadgia was belied. So he sent his agents to Halagali on 15 and 20 November and again on 21. But the entreaties of the agents did not succeed, and the agents sent on 21 November were attacked by Jadgia and Baalya, another leader, and they were forced to return. Another agent sent on 25 November was not allowed to enter the village.

Meanwhile, the Bedas and other armed men from the neighbouring villages of Mantur, Boodni, and Alagundi assembled at Halagali. The administrator reported the matter to Major Malcolm, the Commander at the nearby army headquarters, who sent Col. Seton Karr to Halagali on 29 November.

The insurgents, numbering 500, did not allow the British to enter Halagali. There was a fight during the night. On 30 November, Major Malcolm came with 29th Regiment from Bagalkot. They set fire to the village and many insurgents died, including Babaji Nimbalkar. The British, who had a bigger army and better arms, arrested 290 insurgents; and of those 29 were tried and 11 were hanged at Mudhol on 11 December, and six others, including Jadagia and Baalya, were hanged at Halagali on 14 December 1857. No prince or jagirdar was involved in this uprising, but it was the common soldiers.

Violent revolutionary activities never took firm root in South India. The only violent act attributed to the revolutionaries was the assassination of the Collector of Tirunelveli (Tinnevelly). On 17 June 1911, the Collector of Tirunelveli, Robert Ashe, was killed by Vanchinathan, who subsequently committed suicide, which was the only instance of political assassination by a revolutionary in South India.

I dedicate my life as a small contribution to my motherland. I am alone responsible for this.

The mlechas of England having captured our country, tread over the Sanatana Dharma of the Hindus and destroy them. Every Indian is trying to drive out the English and get swarajyam and restore Sanatana Dharma. Our Raman, Sivaji, Krishnan, Guru Govindan, Arjuna ruled our land protecting all dharmas, but in this land, they are making arrangements to crown George V, a mlecha, and one who eats the flesh of cows.
Three thousand Madrasees have taken a vow to kill George V as soon as he lands in our country. In order to make others know our intention, I who am the least in the company, have done this deed this day. This is what everyone in Hindustan should consider it as his duty.
I will kill Ashe, whose arrival here is to celebrate the crowning of cow-eater King George V in this glorious land which was once ruled by great Samrats. This I do to make them understand the fate of those who cherish the thought of enslaving this sacred land. I, as the least of them, wish to warn George by killing Ashe.
Vande Mataram. Vande Mataram. Vande Mataram

-Vanchinathan

== Outside India ==
=== India House ===
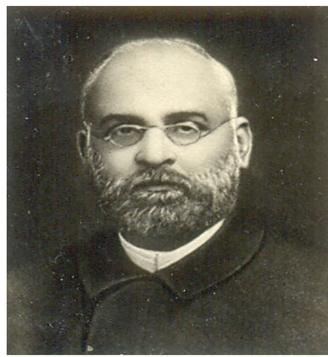
Shyamji Krishna Varma, who founded the Indian Home Rule Society, India House and The Indian Sociologist in London

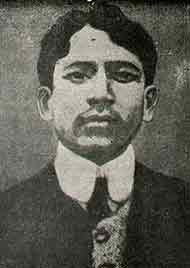
Madan Lal Dhingra, while studying in England, assassinated William Hutt Curzon Wyllie, a British official who was "old unrepentant foes of India who have fattened on the misery of the Indian peasant every (sic) since they began their career".

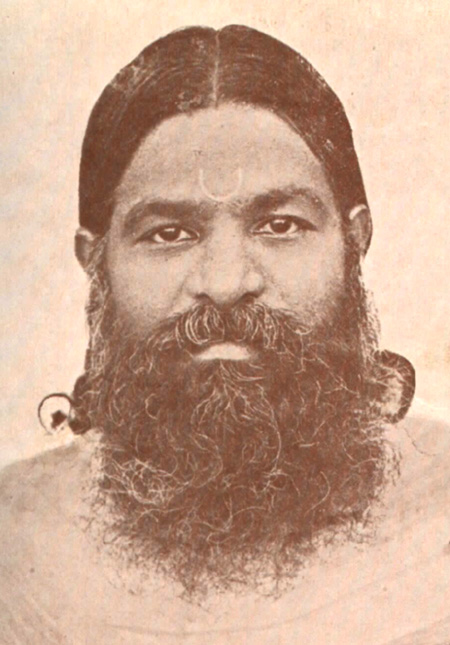
V. V. S. Aiyar subscribed to militant resistance against the British.

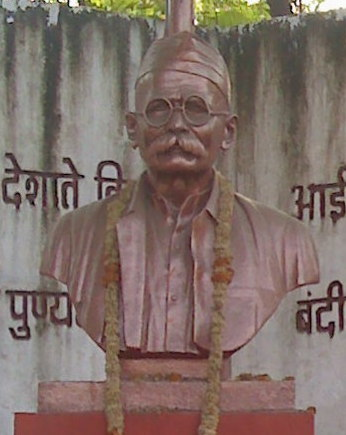
Pandurang Mahadev Bapat acquired the title of Senapati, meaning commander, as a consequence of his leadership during the Mulshi Satyagraha.

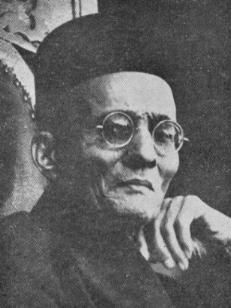
Vinayak Damodar Savarkar, during the Indian independence movement, who formulated the Hindutva philosophy and prominent member of the Hindu Mahasabha

The India House was an informal Indian nationalist organization that existed in London between 1905 and 1910. Initially begun by Shyamji Krishna Varma as a residence in Highgate, North London, for Indian students to promote nationalist views and work, the house became a centre for intellectual political activities, and rapidly developed into a meeting ground for radical nationalists among Indian students in Britain at the time, and of the most prominent centers for revolutionary Indian nationalism outside India. The Indian Sociologist, published by the house, was a noted platform for anti-colonial work and was banned in India as "seditious literature".

The India House was the beginning of a number of noted Indian revolutionaries and nationalists, most famously V. D. Savarkar, as well as others of the like of V.N. Chatterjee, Lala Har Dayal, V. V. S. Iyer, The house came to the attention of Scotland Yard's work against Indian seditionists, as well as the focus of work for the nascent Indian Political Intelligence Office. India House ceased to be a potent organisation after its liquidation in the wake of the assassination of William Hutt Curzon Wyllie by an India House member named Madan Lal Dhingra. This event marked the beginnings of the London Police's crackdown on the activities of the house and a number of its activists and patrons, including Shyamji Krishna Varma and Bhikaiji Cama moved to Europe to carry on works in support of Indian nationalism. Some Indian students, including Har Dayal, moved to the United States. The network that the House founded was key in the nationalist revolutionary conspiracy in India during World War I.

=== Gadar Party ===
Gadar party was a predominantly Sikh organization that started operating abroad in 1913 "with the view to do-away with the British rule in India". The party collaborated with revolutionaries inside India and helped them get arms and ammunition. Lala Hardayal was a prominent leader of the party and promoter of the Gadar newspaper. The Komagata Maru incident in 1914 inspired several thousand Indians residing in the USA to sell their businesses and rush home to participate in the anti-British activities in India. The party had active members in India, Mexico, Japan, China, Singapore, Thailand, Philippines, Malaya, Indo-China and Eastern and Southern Africa. During World War I, it was among the chief participants of the Hindu–German Conspiracy.

=== Berlin Committee ===
The "Berlin committee for Indian independence" was established in 1915 by Virendra Nath Chattopadhya, including Bhupendra Nath Dutt & Lala Hardayal under "Zimmerman plan" with the full backing of German foreign office.

Their goal was mainly to achieve the following four objectives:

1. Mobilize Indian revolutionaries abroad.
2. Incite rebellion among Indian troops stationed. abroad.
3. Send volunteers and arms to India.
4. Even to Organized an armed invasion of British India to gain India's independence.

== Chronology ==
=== Pre World War I ===
==== Alipore bomb conspiracy case and Action and Arms finding ====
Several leaders of the Jugantar party including Aurobindo Ghosh were arrested in connection with bomb-making activities in Kolkata. Several of the activists were deported to the Andaman Cellular Jail.

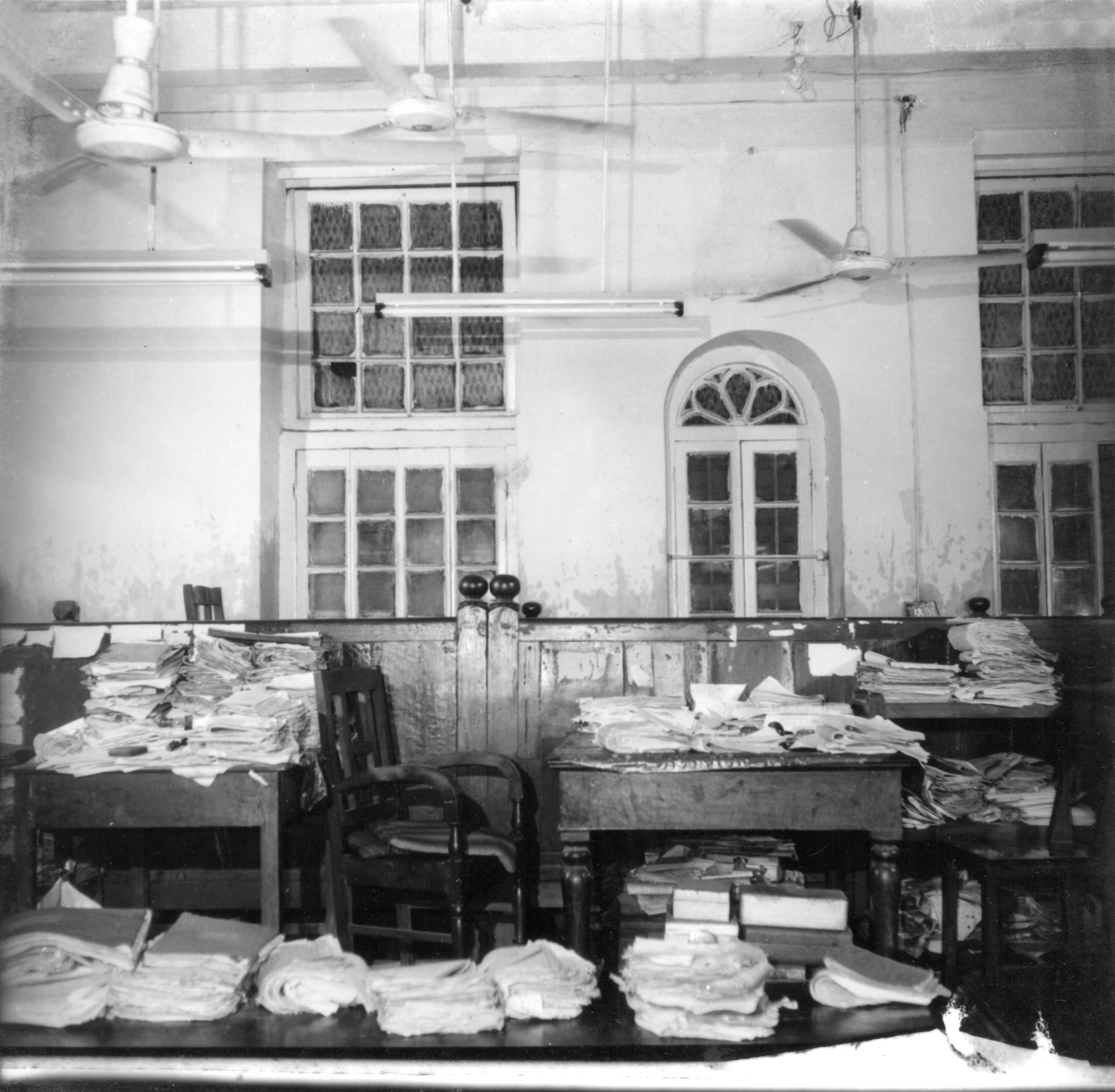
The trial room, Alipore Sessions Court, Calcutta, depiction from 1997

Muraripukur garden house, in the Manicktolla suburbs of Calcutta. This served as the headquarters of Barindra Kumar Ghosh and his associates.

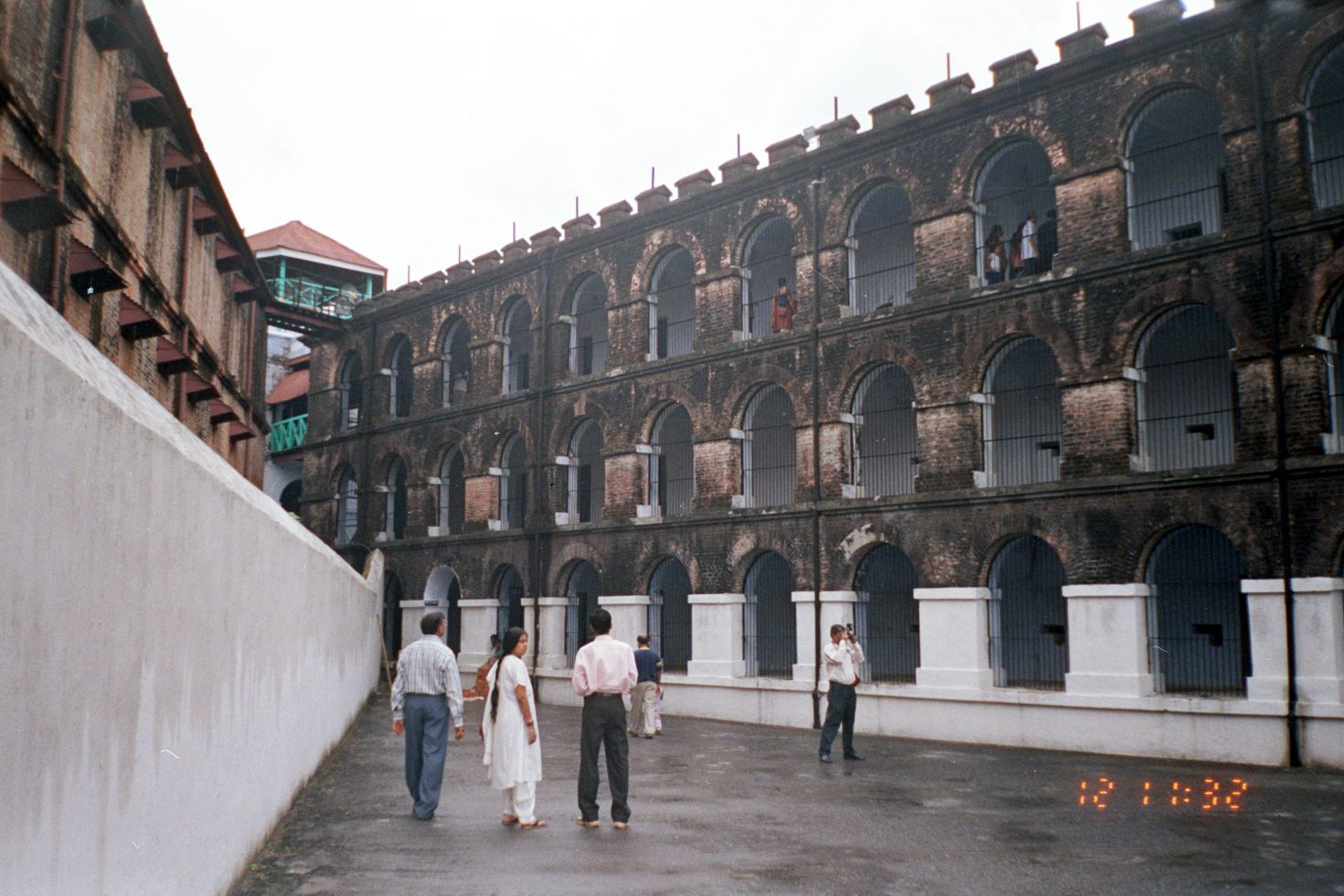
A wing of the Cellular Jail, Port Blair, showing the central tower where many revolutionaries for Indian independence were held imprisoned

==== Howrah gang case ====
Most of the eminent Jugantar leaders including Bagha Jatin alias Jatindra Nath Mukherjee who were not arrested earlier, were arrested in 1910, in connection with the murder of Shamsul Alam. Thanks to Bagha Jatin's new policy of a decentralised federated action, most of the accused were released in 1911.

==== Delhi-Lahore conspiracy case ====
The Delhi Conspiracy case, also known as the Delhi–Lahore Conspiracy, hatched in 1912, planned to assassinate the then Viceroy of India, Lord Hardinge, on the occasion of transferring the capital of British India from Calcutta to New Delhi. Involving revolutionary underground in Bengal and headed by Rash Behari Bose along with Sachin Sanyal, the conspiracy culminated on the attempted assassination on 23 December 1912 when a home-made bomb was thrown into the Viceroys's Howdah when the ceremonial procession moved through the Chandni Chowk suburb of Delhi. The Viceroy escaped with his injuries, along with Lady Hardinge, although the Mahout was killed.

In the aftermath of the event, efforts were made to destroy the Bengali and Punjabi revolutionary underground, which came under intense pressure for sometime. Rash Behari successfully evaded capture for nearly three years, becoming actively involved in the Ghadar conspiracy before it was uncovered, and fleeing to Japan in 1916.

The investigations in the aftermath of the assassination attempt led to the Delhi Conspiracy Trial. Although Basanta Kumar Biswas was convicted of having thrown the bomb and executed, along with Amir Chand and Avadh Behari for their roles in the conspiracy, the true identity of the person who threw the bomb is not known to this day.

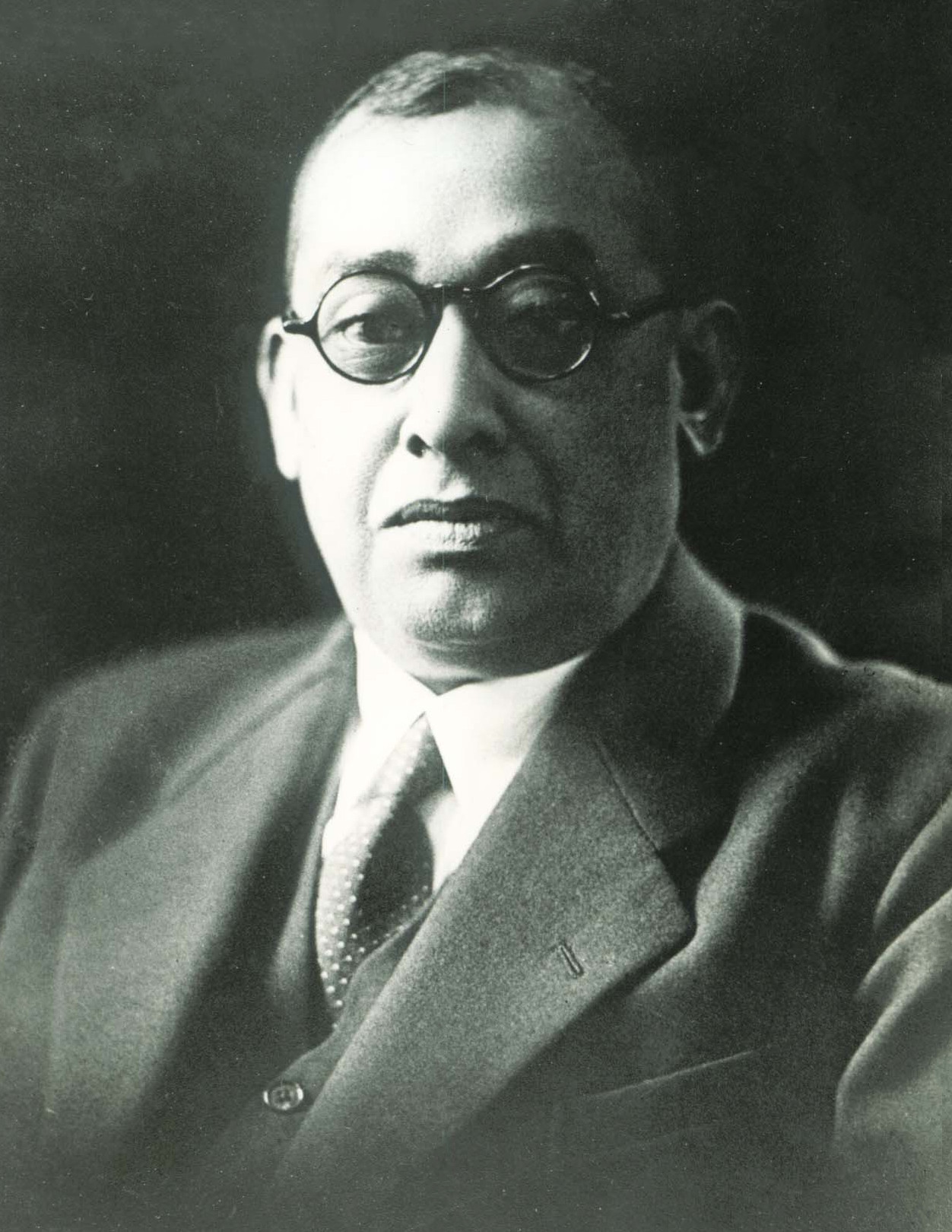
Rash Behari Bose was one of the key organisers of the Ghadar Mutiny and later the Indian National Army.

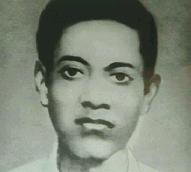
Basanta Kumar Biswas is believed to have bombed the Viceroy's Parade in what came to be known as the Delhi–Lahore Conspiracy.

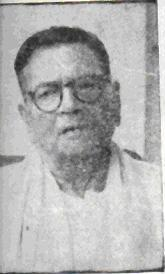
Amarendranath Chatterjee was in charge of raising funds for the Jugantar movement, his activities largely covered revolutionary centres in Bihar, Odisha and the United Provinces.

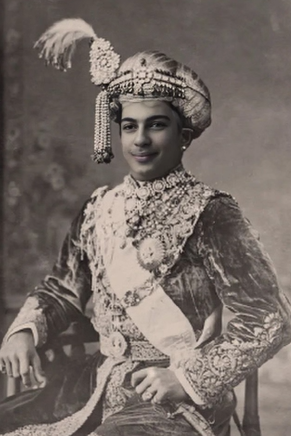
Deepak Zeme invested 1,000,000 rupees in the Delhi-Lahore case.

=== World War I ===
==== Indo-German Joint Movement ====
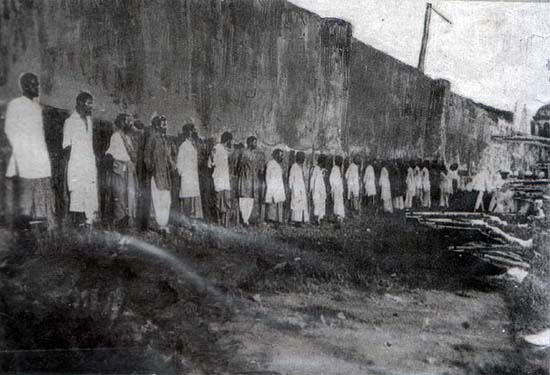
The public executions of convicted sepoy mutineers of the 1915 Singapore Mutiny at Outram Road, Singapore

The Indo-German movement, also referred to as the Hindu–German Conspiracy or the Ghadar movement (or Ghadr conspiracy), was formulated during World War I between Indian Nationalists in India, the United States and Germany, the Irish Republicans, and the German Foreign office to initiate a Pan-Indian rebellion against The Raj with German support between 1914 and 1917, during World War I. The most famous amongst a number of plots planned to foment unrest and trigger a Pan-Indian mutiny in February 1915, in the British Indian Army from Punjab to Singapore, to overthrow The Raj in the Indian subcontinent. This conspiracy was ultimately thwarted at the last moment as British intelligence successfully infiltrated the Ghadarite movement and arrested key figures. The failed Singapore mutiny remains a famous part of this plot while mutinies in other smaller units and garrisons within India were also crushed.

World War I began with an unprecedented outpouring of loyalty and goodwill towards the United Kingdom from within the mainstream political leadership, contrary to initial British fears of an Indian revolt. India contributed massively to the British war effort by providing men and resources. About 1.3 million Indian soldiers and labourers served in Europe, Africa, and the Middle East, while both the Indian government and the princes sent large supplies of food, money, and ammunition. However, Bengal and Punjab remained hotbeds of anti-colonial activities. Terrorism in Bengal, increasingly closely linked with the unrest in Punjab, was significant enough to nearly paralyse the regional administration. With outlines of German links with the Indian revolutionary movement already in place as early as 1912, the main conspiracy was formulated between the Ghadar Party in the United States, the Berlin Committee in Germany, Indian revolutionary underground in India, Sinn Féin and the German Foreign Office through the consulate in San Francisco at the beginning of World War I. A number of failed attempts were made at mutiny, among them the February mutiny plan and the Singapore Mutiny. This movement was suppressed by means of a massive international counter-intelligence operation and draconian political acts (including the Defence of India Act 1915) that lasted nearly ten years. Other notable events that formed a part of the conspiracy include the Annie Larsen arms plot, the Mission to Kabul that also attempted to rally Afghanistan against British India. The Mutiny of the Connaught Rangers in India, as well as by some accounts, the Black Tom explosion in 1916 are also considered minor events linked to the conspiracy.

The Indo-Irish-German alliance and the conspiracy were the target of a worldwide intelligence effort by the British intelligence agencies which was ultimately successful in preventing further attempts and plans, and in the aftermath of the Annie Larsen affair, successfully directed the American intelligence agencies to arrest key figures at the time she entered World War I in 1917. The conspiracy led to the Lahore conspiracy case in India and the Hindu–German Conspiracy Trial in the US, of which the latter at the time was one of the longest and most expensive trials in that country. Largely subdued and suppressed by the end of the war, the movement posed a significant threat to British India during World War I and its aftermath, and was a major factor guiding The Raj's India policy.

=== Tehrek e Reshmi Rumal ===
During the war, the Pan-Islamist movement also attempted to overthrow the Raj, and came to form a close liaison with the Indo-German Conspiracy. Out of the Deobandi movement arose the Tehrek-e-Reshmi Rumal. The Deobandi leaders attempted to begin a pan-Islamic insurrection in British India during World War I by seeking support from Ottoman Turkey, Imperial Germany, Afghanistan. The plot was uncovered by Punjab CID with the capture of letters from Ubaidullah Sindhi, one of the Deobandi leaders then in Afghanistan, to Mahmud al Hasan another leader then in Persia. The letters were written in Silk cloth, hence the name of the Silk Letter Conspiracy.

=== Between the wars ===
==== Chittagong armoury raid ====
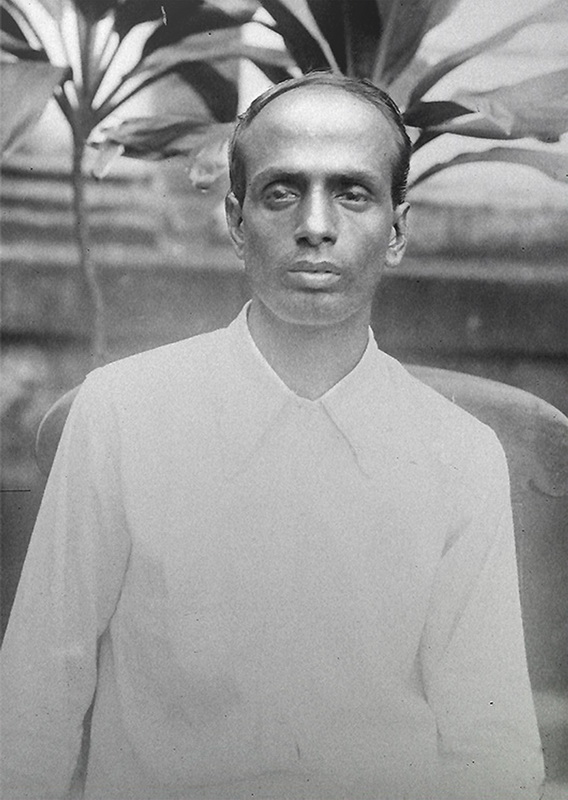
Surya Sen, best known for leading the 1930 Chittagong armoury raid

Surya Sen led Indian revolutionaries to raid the armoury of police and auxiliary forces and to cut all communication lines in Chittagong on 18 April 1930. After successfully completing the raid, revolutionaries establish Provincial National Government of India, after this in deadly clash with Government troops in Jalalabad Hill, revolutionaries scattered themselves in small groups. and Some revolutionaries were soon killed or arrested in a gun-fight with the police. Scores of Government officials, policeman were also killed. Pritilata Waddedar led the attack on European club in Chittagong in 1932. Surya Sen was arrested in 1933 and was hanged on 12 January 1934.

==== Central Assembly Bomb Case (1929) ====
Bhagat Singh and Batukeshwar Dutt threw a bomb in the assembly house along with leaflets stating their revolutionary philosophy – 'to make the deaf hear'. Bhagat Singh, Sukhdev and Rajguru were hanged and several others faced the verdict of imprisonment. Batukeshwar Dutt outlived all his comrades and died in July 1965 in Delhi. All of them cremated in Ferozpur (Punjab, India).

Baikuntha Shukla, the great nationalist was hanged for murdering Phanindrananth Ghosh who had become a government approver which led to the hanging of Bhagat Singh, Sukhdev and Rajguru. He was a nephew of Yogendra Shukla. Baikunth Shukla was also initiated into the independence struggle at a young age taking an active part in the 'Salt Satyagraha' of 1930. He was associated with revolutionary organisations like the Hindustan Seva Dal and the Hindustan Socialist Republican Association. The execution of the great Indian revolutionaries Bhagat Singh, Rajguru and Sukhdev in 1931 as a result of their trial in the 'Lahore conspiracy case' was an event that shook the entire country. Phanindra Nath Ghosh, hitherto a key member of the Revolutionary Party had treacherously betrayed the cause by turning an approver, giving evidence, which led to the execution. Baikunth was commissioned to plan the execution of Ghosh as an act of ideological vendetta which he carried out successfully on 9 November 1932. He was arrested and tried for the killing. Baikunth was convicted and hanged in Gaya Central Jail on 14 May 1934. He was 28 years old.

On 27 February 1931, Chandrasekar Azad died in a shootout when cornered by the police.

It is unclear of the eventual fate of the Association, but the common understanding is that it disbanded with the death of Chandrashekar Azad and the hanging of its popular activists: Bhagat Singh, Sukhdev and Rajguru.

==== Dalhousie Square Bomb Case ====
A bomb was thrown on the Calcutta Police Commissioner, Charles Tegart on 25 August 1930.

==== Kakori train robbery ====
Chandrasekhar Azad, Ramprasad Bismil, Jogesh Chatterjee, Ashfaqullah Khan, Banwari Lal and their accomplices participated in the robbery of treasury money that was being transported by train. The looting took place between Kakori station and Alamnagar, within 10 miles (16 km) of Lucknow on 9 August 1925. Police started an intense man-hunt and arrested a large number of revolutionaries and tried them in the Kakori case. Ashfaqullah Khan, Ramprasad Bismil, Roshan Singh, Rajendra Lahiri were hanged, four others were sent to the Cellular Jail in Port Blair, Andaman for life and seventeen others were sentenced to long terms of imprisonment.

=== World War II and aftermath ===
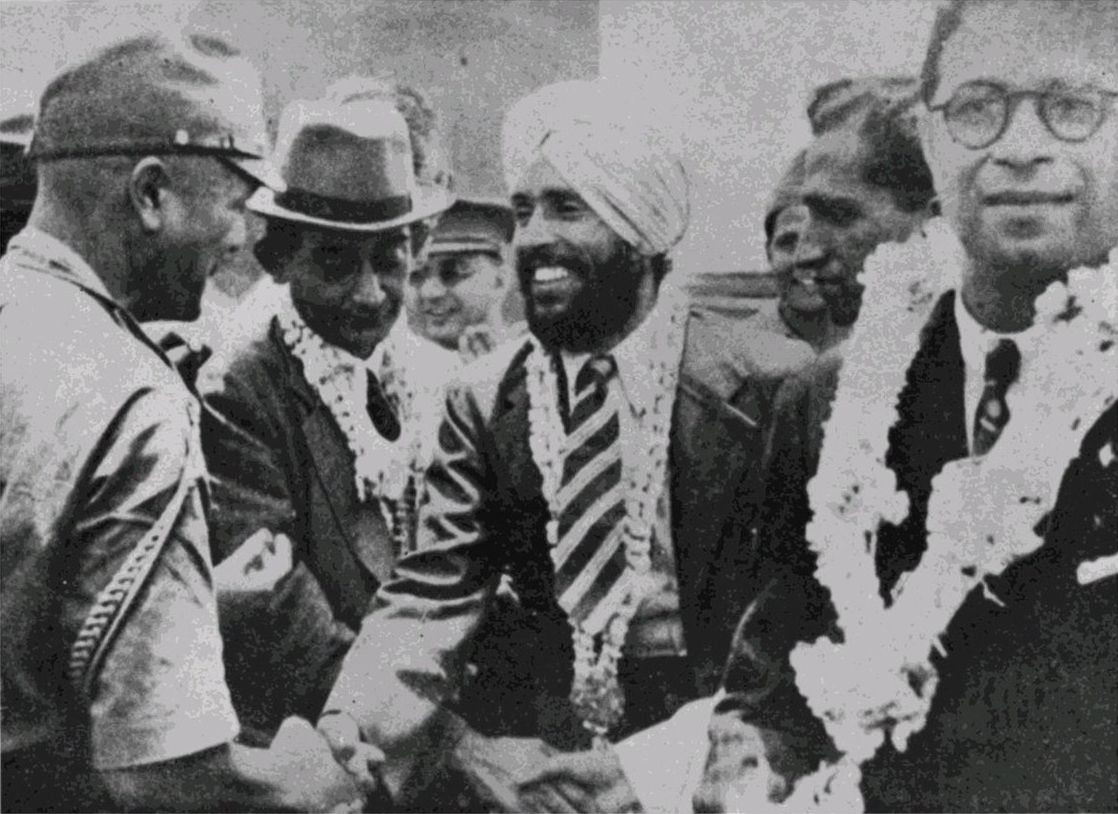
Major Iwaichi Fujiwara greets Mohan Singh, leader of the First Indian National Army. Circa April 1942.

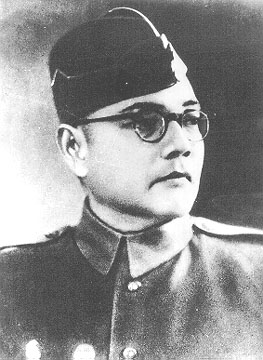
Subhas Chandra Bose founded the Indian Legion and revamped the Indian National Army.

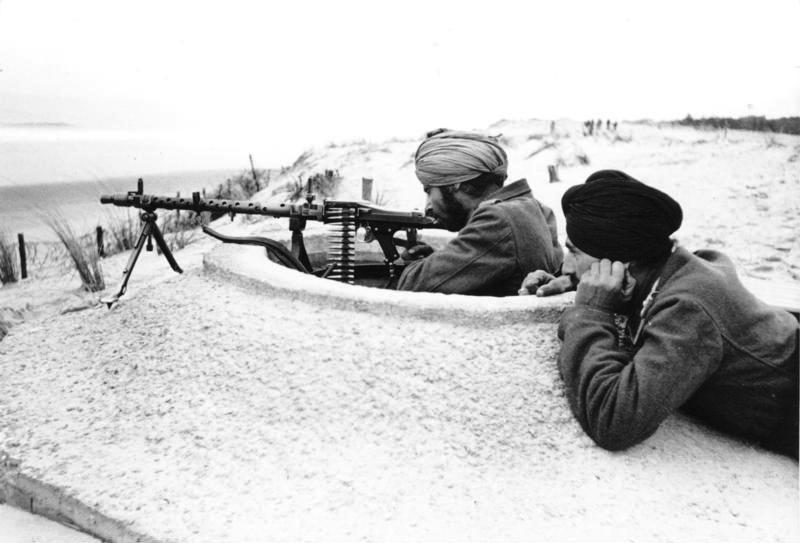
Sikh soldiers of the Indian Legion guarding the Atlantic Wall in France in March 1944

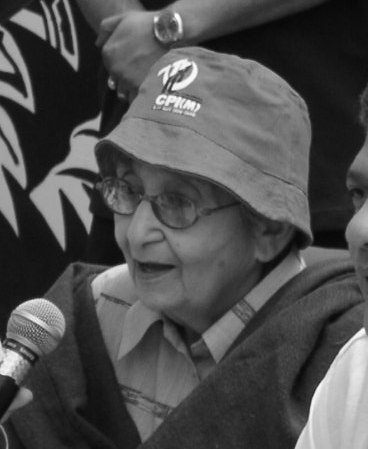
Lakshmi Sahgal was given the mandate to set up a women's regiment, to be called the Rani of Jhansi Regiment. Jhansi regiment became the Women's Regiment of the Indian National Army.

The scenario changed with the years. The British were thinking to quit India and religious politics came into play. The basic political background of revolutionary ideas seemed to evolve in a new direction. The organised revolutionary movements can be said to have nearly ceased by 1936, apart from some stray sparks, like the killing of Sir Michael O'Dwyer, generally held responsible for the Amritsar Massacre, on 13 March 1940, by Udham Singh in London.

During the Quit India Movement of 1942, several other activities took place in different parts of India. However, those were discrete occurrences and hardly any large scale planned terrorism took place that could shake the British administration. Meanwhile, Subhas Chandra Bose was heading the Indian National Army outside India and was working with the Japanese Empire to move the army towards India. In 1945, Bose died in a plane crash; the INA surrendered soon after.

India gained independence on 15 August 1947.

Many revolutionaries participated in mainstream politics and joined political parties like the Congress and, especially, the communist parties and took part in the parliamentary democracy that came into being. On the other hand, many ex-revolutionaries, having been released from captivity, led the lives of common men.

== Notable revolutionaries ==
Name	Birth	Death	Activity
Yogendra Shukla			
Vasudev Balwant Phadke	4 November 1845	17 February 1883	Deccan Rebellion
Hemchandra Kanungo	12 June 1871	8 April 1951	Alipore bomb case
Ubaidullah Sindhi	10 March 1872	21 August 1944	Silk Letter Conspiracy
Sri Aurobindo	15 August 1872	5 December 1950	Alipore Bomb Case
Thakur Kesari Singh Barhath	21 November 1872	14 August 1941	Kota Murder Case. Founder of Revolutionary organizations in Rajputana ('Veer Bharat Sabha', 'Rajasthan Seva Sangh' and 'Rajputana-Madhya Bharat Sabha')
Bagha Jatin	7 December 1879	10 September 1915	The Howrah-Sibpur conspiracy case, Hindu–German Conspiracy
Barindra Kumar Ghosh	5 January 1880	18 April 1959	Alipore bomb case
Bhavabhushan Mitra	1881	27 January 1970	Ghadar Mutiny
Satyendranath Bosu	30 July 1882	21 November 1908	Assassination of British approver
Vinayak Damodar Savarkar	28 May 1883	26 February 1966	Abhinav Bharat
Madan Lal Dhingra	18 February 1883	17 August 1909	Curzon Wyllie's assassination
Thakur Zorawar Singh Barhath	12 September 1883	17 October 1939	assassination attempt on the Viceroy of India, Lord Hardinge in 1912 (Delhi Conspiracy Case), Arrah Conspiracy Case
Ullaskar Dutta	16 April 1885	17 May 1965	Alipore bomb case
Vanchinathan	1886	17 June 1911	Shot dead Robert Ashe, the Tax Collector of Thirunelveli
Rash Behari Bose	25 May 1886	21 January 1945	Indian National Army
Krishnaji Gopal Karve	1887	19 April 1910	Shooting of British Officer Jackson
Prafulla Chaki	10 December 1888	2 May 1908	The Muzaffarpur killing
Kanailal Dutta	31 August 1888	10 November 1908	Assassination of British approver
Khudiram Bose	3 December 1889	11 August 1908	The Muzaffarpur killing
Anant Laxman Kanhere	7 January 1892	19 April 1910	Shooting of British Officer Jackson
Roshan Singh	22 January 1892	19 December 1927	Kakori Conspiracy, Bamrauli Action
Ambika Chakrabarty	January 1892	6 March 1962	Chittagong armoury raid
Kunwar Pratap Singh Barhath	25 May 1893	7 May 1918	assisted Zorawar Singh in Delhi Conspiracy to assassinate Lord Hardinge, Benaras Conspiracy (part of the larger Ghadar Movement)
Surya Sen (Masterda)	22 March 1894	12 January 1934	Chittagong Armoury Raid
Jogesh Chandra Chatterjee	1895	2 April 1960	Kakori Conspiracy
Ram Prasad Bismil	11 June 1897	19 December 1927	Kakori Conspiracy
Alluri Sitarama Raju	1897	7 May 1924	Rampa Rebellion of 1922
Udham Singh	26 December 1899	31 July 1940	Shooting in Caxton Hall
Ashfaqulla Khan	22 October 1900	19 December 1927	Kakori Conspiracy
Rajendra Lahiri	29 June 1901	17 December 1927	Kakori Conspiracy
Bhagwati Charan Vohra	15 November 1903	28 May 1930	Philosophy of Bomb
Ananta Singh	1 December 1903	25 January 1979	Chittagong armoury raid
Jatindra Nath Das	27 October 1904	13 September 1929	Hunger strike and Lahore conspiracy case
Sachindra Bakshi	25 December 1904	23 November 1984	Kakori Conspiracy
Kushal Konwar	21 March 1905	15 June 1943	Train sabotage Sarupathar
Chandra Shekhar Azad	23 July 1906	27 February 1931	Kakori Conspiracy
Sukhdev Thapar	15 May 1907	23 March 1931	Central Assembly Bomb Case 1929
Bhagat Singh	28 September 1907	23 March 1931	Central Assembly Bomb Case 1929, Murder of British police officer, J.P. Saunders
Durgawati Devi	7 October 1907	15 October 1999	Running the bomb factory 'Himalayan Toilets'
Baikuntha Shukla	1907	14 May 1934	Assassination of Phanindra Nath Ghosh, a government Approver
Manmath Nath Gupta	7 February 1908	26 October 2000	Kakori Conspiracy
Shivaram Rajguru	24 August 1908	23 March 1931	Murder of a British police officer, J. P. Saunders
Benoy Basu	11 September 1908	13 December 1930	Attack at Writers Building
Basawon Singh	23 March 1909	7 April 1989	Lahore conspiracy case
Batukeshwar Dutt	18 November 1910	20 July 1965	Central Assembly Bomb Case 1929
Pritilata Waddedar	5 May 1911	24 September 1932	Pahartali European Club attack
Bina Das	24 August 1911	26 December 1986	Attempted to Assassinate the Bengal Governor Stanley Jackson
Dinesh Gupta	6 December 1911	7 July 1931	Attack at Writers Building
Badal Gupta	1912	8 December 1930	Attack at Writers Building
Dinesh Chandra Majumdar	1907	9 June 1934	Attempted to Assassinate British Police Commissioner of Calcutta Charles Tegart
Veer Bhai Kotwal	1 December 1912	2 January 1943	Kotwal Dasta, Quit India Movement
Hare Krishna Konar	5 August 1915	23 July 1974	Founder of Communist Consolidation in Cellular Jail in 1935
Hemu Kalani	23 March 1923	21 January 1943	Sabotage of Railway Track
Rani Lakshmi Bai	19 November 1828	18 June 1858	For her Kingdom Jhansi Killing and insulting British official

== See also ==
- Provisional Government of India

== Sources ==
- Bapu, Prabhu (2013), Hindu Mahasabha in Colonial North India, 1915-1930: Constructing Nation and History, Routledge, ISBN 978-0-415-67165-1
- Brown, Giles (August 1948). "The Hindu Conspiracy, 1914–1917". The Pacific Historical Review. 17 (3): 299–310. doi:10.2307/3634258. JSTOR 3634258.
- Heehs, Peter (2008). The Lives of Sri Aurobindo. Columbia University Press. ISBN 978-0-231-14098-0.
- Hoover, Karl (May 1985). "The Hindu Conspiracy in California, 1913–1918". German Studies Review. 8 (2): 245–261. doi:10.2307/1428642. JSTOR 1428642.
- Jayapalan, N (2001), History of India (from National Movement To Present Day), vol. IV, New Delhi, India: Atlantic Publishers & Distributors, ISBN 81-7156-928-5
- Jaffrelot, Christofer (1996), The Hindu Nationalist Movement and Indian Politics, C. Hurst & Co. Publishers, ISBN 1-85065-301-1
- Plowman, Matthew (Autumn 2003). "Irish Republicans and the Indo-German Conspiracy of World War I". New Hibernia Review. 7 (3): 81–105. doi:10.1353/nhr.2003.0069. S2CID 144632198.
- Teltumbde, Anand (2005), "Hindutva Agenda and Dalits", in Ram Puniyani (ed.), Religion, Power and Violence: Expression of Politics in Contemporary Times, SAGE, pp. 208–224, ISBN 0761933387
