= Dinesh Gupta =

Indian revolutionary (1911–1931)

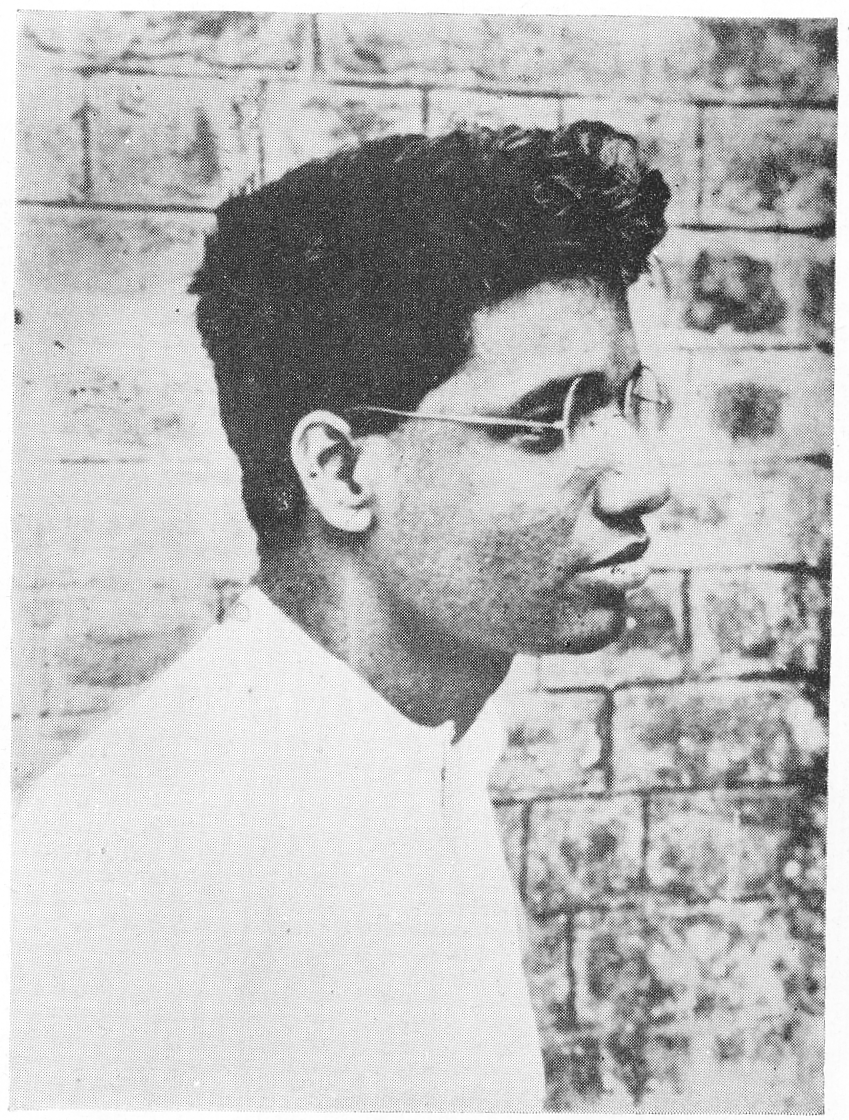
- Born: 6 December 1911; Bikrampur, Eastern Bengal and Assam, British India
- Died: 7 July 1931 (aged 19); Alipore Jail, Calcutta, Bengal, British India
- Cause of death: Execution by hanging
- Education: Dhaka College
- Known for: Writers' Building attack
- Parents: Satish Chandra Gupta (father); Binodini Devi (mother)

Dinesh Chandra Gupta (Bengali: দীনেশচন্দ্র গুপ্ত Dinesh Chôndro Gupto) or Dinesh Gupta (6 December 1911 – 7 July 1931) was an Indian revolutionary against British rule in India, who is noted for launching an attack on the Secretariat Building - the Writers' Building in the Dalhousie square in Calcutta, along with Badal Gupta and Benoy Basu.

Rabindrasangeet exponent and trainer Maya Sen (maiden name Gupta) was his niece. Even he suggested his sister-in-law Ashalata Gupta to let Maya learn Rabindrasangeet. His nephew and Maya's brother, Tapan Gupta, was a doctor and established 'the Tagoreans' in London. Mr. Gupta's daughter is an MBE, Tanika Gupta, a playwright and regularly works for BBC and the stage in England.

== Early activities ==
Dinesh Gupta was born on 6 December 1911 in Josholong in Munshiganj District, now in Bangladesh. While he was studying in Dhaka College, Dinesh joined Bengal Volunteers - a group organized by Subhas Chandra Bose in 1928, on the occasion of the Calcutta session of the Indian National Congress. Soon, the Bengal Volunteers transformed itself to a more active revolutionary association and planned to assassinate certain Indian Imperial Police officers. For a short while, Dinesh Gupta was in Midnapore training local revolutionaries in the use of firearms. Revolutionaries trained by him were responsible for the assassination of three District Magistrates in succession, Douglas, Burge, and Peddy.

== The battle of Writers' Building ==
The association targeted Lt Col NS Simpson, the Inspector General of Prisons, who was infamous for his mistreatment of the prisoners in the jails. The revolutionaries decided not only to murder him, but also to strike terror in British colonial circles by launching an attack on the Secretariat Building - the Writers' Building in the Dalhousie Square in Kolkata.

On 8 December 1930, Dinesh, along with Benoy Basu and Badal Gupta, dressed in European costume, entered the Writers' Building and shot dead Simpson. Nearby police started firing at them in response. What ensued was a brief gunfight between the three young revolutionaries and the police. Some other officers, like Twynam, Prentice, and Nelson, suffered injuries during the shooting.

Soon, police overpowered them. However, the three did not wish to be arrested. Badal Gupta took Potassium cyanide, while Benoy and Dinesh shot themselves with their own revolvers. Benoy was taken to the hospital, where he died on 13 December 1930.

== The trial and hanging ==
However, Dinesh survived the near-fatal injury. He was convicted and sentenced to death.

While in Alipore Jail, he wrote letters to his sister. He was hanged on 7 July 1931 at Alipore Jail. Soon after that, Kanailal Bhattacharjee took revenge for the hanging by killing Judge Ralph Reynolds Garlick (the judge of the Dinesh Gupta case) on 27 July 1931.

== Writings ==
Dinesh Gupta translated a short story by Anton Chekhov, which was published in Prabasi Magazine. He also wrote 92 letters from the condemned cell of the Alipore Central Jail. A few to his sister in law (boudi) Ashalata Gupta.

== Significance ==
Benoy, Badal, and Dinesh were treated as martyrs by supporters in Bengal and other parts of India. After independence, Dalhousie Square was named B. B. D. Bagh - after the Benoy-Badal-Dinesh trio. In memory of their writers' attack, a plate was engraved in the wall of the Writers' Building, first floor.

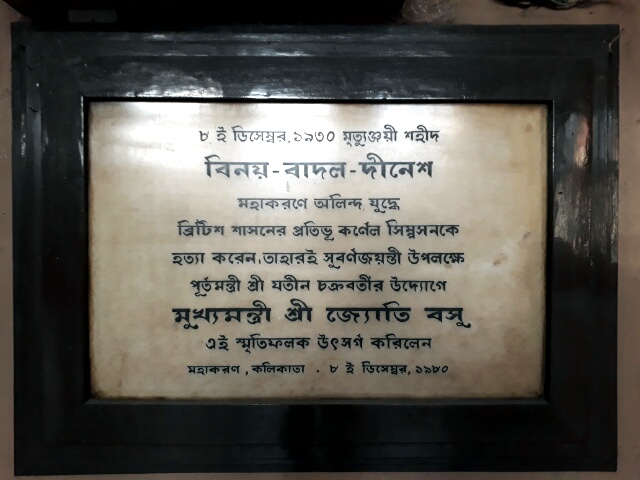
Memory of martyrdom

== Bibliography ==
- Hemendranath Dasgupta, Bharater Biplab Kahini, II & III, Calcutta, 1948;
- Ramesh Chandra Majumdar, History of the Freedom Movement in India, III, Calcutta 1963;
- Ganganarayan Chandra, Abismaraniya, Calcutta, 1966.
