= Badal Gupta =

Indian revolutionary (1912–1930)

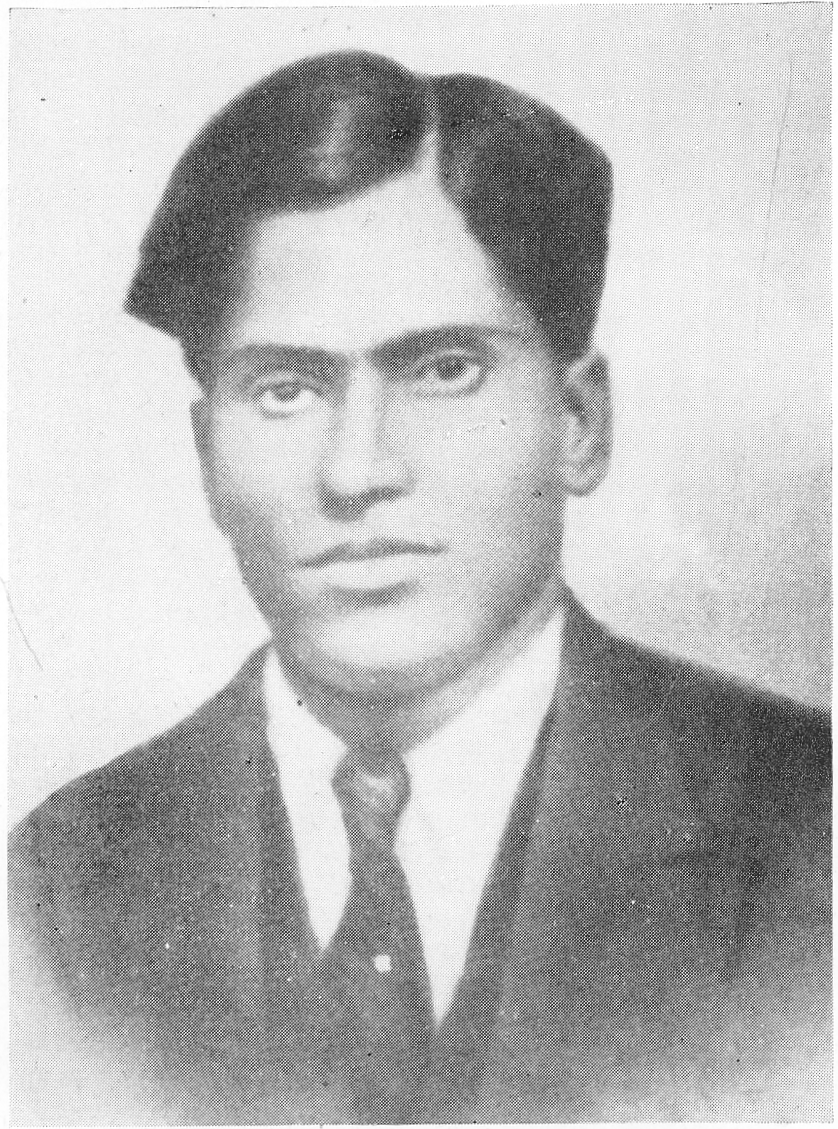
- Born: Sudhir Gupta; 1912; Bikrampur, Bengal, British India
- Died: 8 December 1930 (aged 17–18); Writers' Building, Calcutta, Bengal, British India
- Known for: Writers' Building attack
- Parents: Abani Kanta Gupta (father); Amala Sundari devi (mother)

Badal Gupta (Bengali: বাদল গুপ্ত; born Sudhir Gupta; 1912 – 8 December 1930) was an Indian revolutionary and anti-colonial figure. He is best known for his participation in the attack on the Secretariat Building - the Writers' Building in the Dalhousie square in Calcutta, along with Benoy Basu and Dinesh Gupta, in December 1930.

== Early activities ==
Badal Gupta was born in the village Purba Shimulia (East Shimulia) in the Bikrampur region of Dhaka, now in Munshiganj District, Bangladesh. Badal Gupta was also influenced by the revolutionary activities of his two paternal uncles Late Dharaninath Gupta and Nagendranath Gupta, who were involved in the Alipore Bomb Case and were imprisoned along with Rishi Aurobindo Ghosh.While studying at Banaripara School, Nikunj Sen, a teacher there, inspired Badal to love patriotism Badal Gupta joined the Bengal Volunteers in 1928.

== The battle at Writers' Building ==
Bengal Volunteers targeted Lt Col NS Simpson, the Inspector General of Prisons, who was infamous for the oppression of the prisoners in the jails. The revolutionaries decided not only to murder him, but also to strike a terror in the British official circles by launching an attack on the Secretariat Building - the Writers' Building in the Dalhousie square in Kolkata.

On 8 December 1930, Badal along with Dinesh Gupta and Benoy, dressed in European costume, entered the Writers' Building and shot dead Simpson. Police in the building started firing at them in response. What ensued was a brief gunfight between the three young revolutionaries and the police. Some other officers like Twynam, Prentice, and Nelson suffered injuries during the shooting.

Soon police overpowered them. However, the three did not wish to be arrested. Badal took Potassium cyanide, while Benoy and Dinesh shot themselves with their own revolvers. Badal died on the spot. He was only 18 years old when this incident took place.

== Significance ==
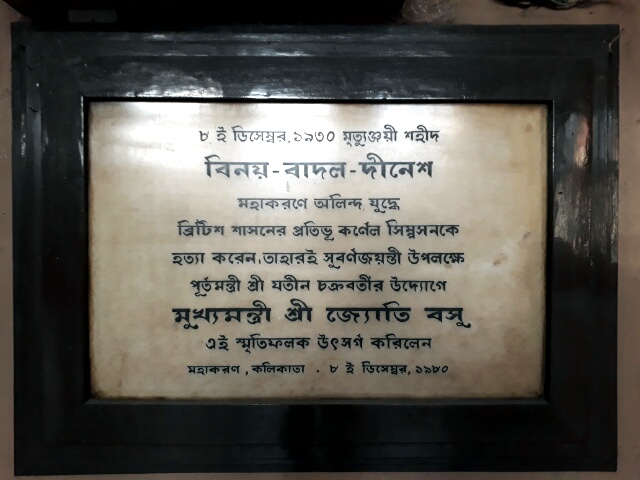
Memory of martyrdom of Writers' attack

After independence, the Dalhousie Square was named B. B. D. Bagh - after the Benoy-Badal-Dinesh trio. In memory of their Writers' Building attack, a plate was engraved in the wall of the Writers' Building, on the first floor.

== Bibliography ==
- Dasgupta, Hemendranath (1948). Bharater Biplab Kahini. Vol. II & III. Calcutta: Bhārata Buka Ejensi. OCLC 498790225.
- Majumdar, R. C. (1971) [First published 1963]. History of the Freedom Movement in India. Vol. III (2nd ed.). Calcutta: Firma K.L. Mukhopadhyay. OCLC 2188820.
- Chandra, Ganganarayan (1966). Abismaraniya (in Bengali). OCLC 20102051.
- Aamar Mama Badal Gupta: A memoir by Biswanath Dasgupta 2020
