= Writers' Building =

- মহাকরণ
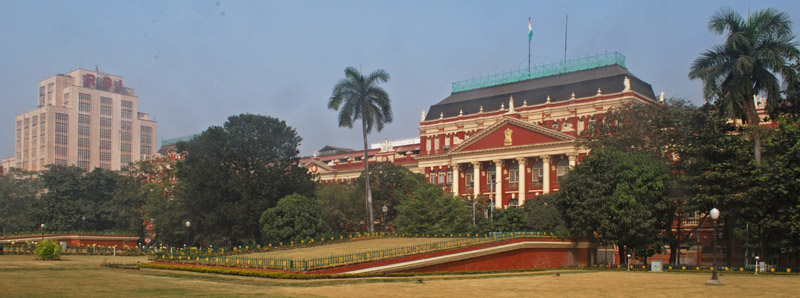
- Main façade of the Writers' Building
- Interactive map of the Writers' Building area

General information
- Location: Binoy Badal Dinesh Bag N Road, BBD Bagh, Kolkata – 700001, Kolkata, West Bengal, India
- Coordinates: 22.57369°N 88.349634°E
- Construction started: 1777
- Opened: 1780; 246 years ago
- Owner: Government of West Bengal

Technical details
- Floor count: 3
- Floor area: 37850 Square Feet

Design and construction
- Architect: Thomas Lyon

The Writers' Building or Mahakaran is the secretariat building of the state government of West Bengal in Kolkata. The 150-metre long building covers the entire northern stretch of Red Lake at the centre of historic B.B.D. Bagh, long considered as the administrative and business hub of the city. As a heritage building, it remains at a central place in Bengal's politics as a witness to Bengal's evolution and Indian independence movement.

Built as an office for East India Company writers (junior clerks) in 1777, the Writers' Building housed the provincial government of Bengal between 1937 and 1947, and the state government of West Bengal between 1947 and 2013, before being used for the role again since 2026.

The building has been called a mini-township of sorts with a built-up area of around 550,000 square feet. Before the shifting of the state secretariat, the building housed 34 departments of the state government, and served as the office for approximately 6,000 employees. As of October 2025, the renovation of the building continues.

== History ==
The Writers' Building was designed by Thomas Lyon in 1777 for the EIC, which wanted to consolidate its trading operations in India and centralize the tax operations the EIC undertook in Bengal Subah. Over time, as British mercantile interest in India grew and the EIC defeated the Nawabs of Bengal, it was re-purposed as the effective headquarters of the EIC and later the entire British Raj in the Indian subcontinent. For more than 200 years the building served as the centre of British power and claims, as the seat of government of the Bengal Presidency and later the Province of Bengal. In the early part of the twentieth century, the building was the site of agitations, violence and assassination attempts during the Indian independence movement. Since India's independence in 1947, it has served as the state secretariat and has been the location of turbulent politics, mob violence and police brutality. It has also become a popular metonym for the government of West Bengal, and especially the unbroken 34-year long Left Front rule in the state.

The building has also played a fundamental part in shaping the history of the immediate region, as the village of Kalikata became British Calcutta and finally Kolkata. From its conception, the building was designed to become the focal administrative and business hub of the city emerging around it and was thus built close to existing infrastructure owned by the EIC. It was constructed on parts of the same parcel of land where the original Fort William, the EICs primary military stronghold in Bengal, stood until 1756. It also marked the centre of the 'White Town', populated primarily by English merchants, officers and EIC functionaries which was kept separate from the 'Black Town' populated primarily by the native landowners and businessmen.

=== Timeline ===
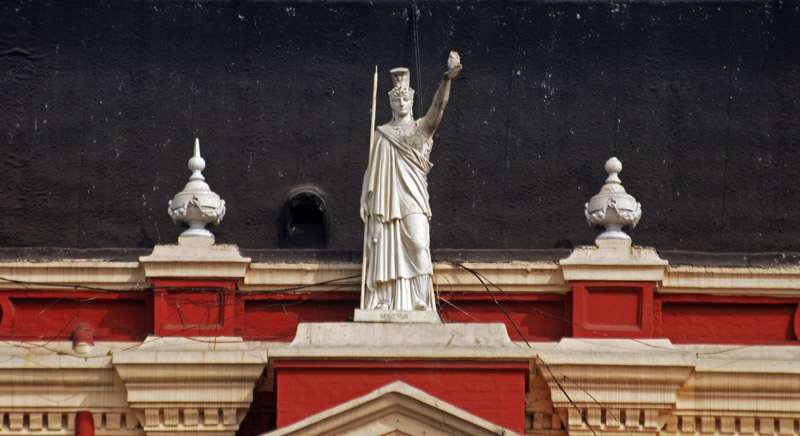
Statue of Minerva atop Writers' Building

1777-1780: Construction The site of the demolished St Anne's church and the adjoining plot were granted to Thomas Lyon, after whom the road behind Writers Building - Lyons Range - is named, to construct buildings to accommodate the junior servants of the East India Company called "writers". Lyon may have been a carpenter earlier in England but had established himself as an architect in Kolkata at the time, and completed the construction acting on behalf of Richard Barwell, member of the Supreme Council of Bengal and himself an ex-writer for EIC. Warren Hastings, the then governor of Governor-General of the Presidency of Fort William presided over the project and presumably was the one who commissioned it. Writers' Building was the first three-storey building in Kolkata. The main block, with a ground coverage of 37850 Square Feet was completed in 1780. It occupied one side of what was then called Tank Square (Dalhousie Square). It was built on a purely functional premise, shunning decorations for a straight facade and enclosure style compound in the back. The building initially opened with 19 residential quarters, each with three sets of windows, and was counted as a bit of an eyesore by the erstwhile English residents.

1800: College Fort William College, opened to train writers in Oriental languages, later moved to this building. Over the next 20 years, structural changes were made, including a new hostel for 32 students and an exam hall (which still exist), a lecture hall, four libraries and rooms to teach Hindi and Persian.

1821: facade created A 128 ft-long verandah with Ionic columns, each 32 ft high, were added on the first and second floors.

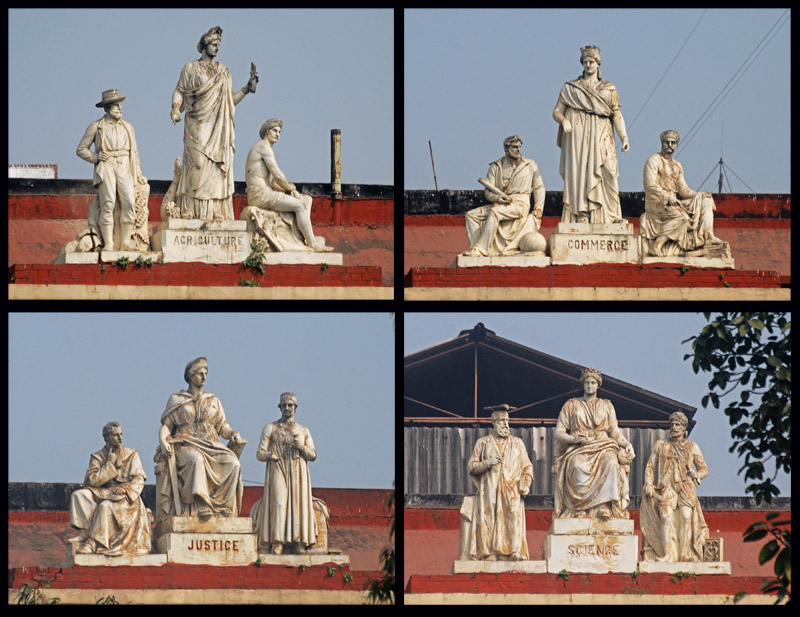
Cluster of statues atop Writers' Building

1830: Government College of Engineering The college moved out of Writers' and the building fell into the hands of private individuals who turned it into living quarters, shops and godowns. The Government College of Engineering functioned from here for some time.

1871–74: Railway Headquarter George Campbell, lieutenant governor-general, felt the need for a secretariat for "quick disposal of work". But with the East Indian Railway Company occupying a large space at Writers' being unable to find alternative accommodation fast, the plan was slow to unfold.

1877–82: Secretariat for Bengal Province Ashley Eden, lieutenant-governor of Bengal, was told to relocate the principal offices, housed on Sudder Street and Chowringhee, to Writers'. Because of the space crunch, three new blocks (classified as Blocks 1,2 and 5 today) were initially constructed, that stood perpendicular to the main block.

1879–1906: Further expansion Two further blocks (classified as Blocks 3 and 4 today) were added, approached by iron staircases that are still in use. The total ground coverage of the five new numbered blocks stood at 58825 square feet. Writers' acquired its Greco-Roman look, complete with the portico in the central bay and the red surface of exposed brick. The Victorian Era British administration wanted to give a grand and powerful image to this public institution and Writers’ received a makeover in French Renaissance style with the parapet being put in place and edifying statues sculpted by William Frederick Woodington lining the terrace, installed in 1883. The statue of Minerva stands above the central portico.

1930: Assassination of Colonel N. S. Simpson

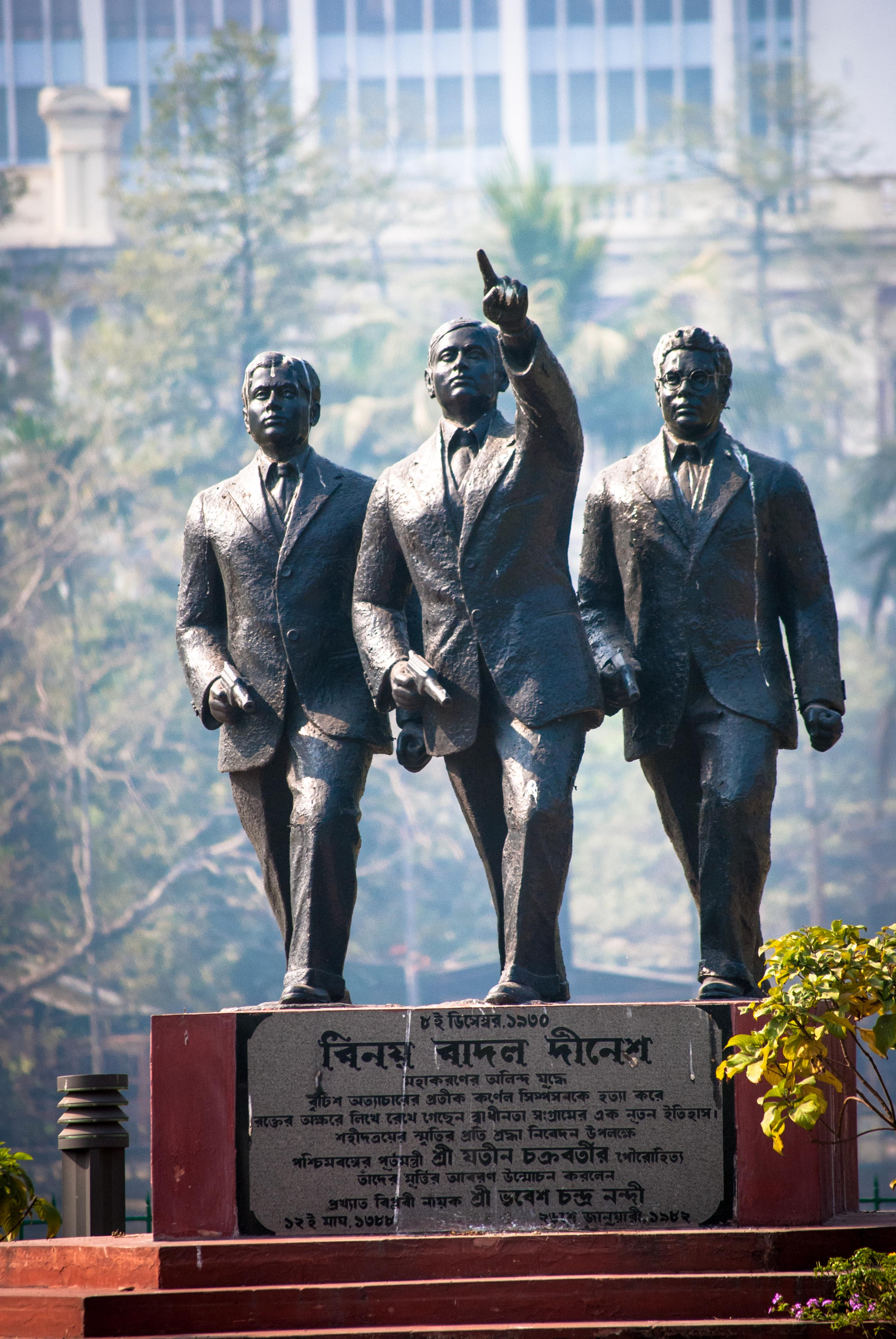
Statue of Benoy, Badal and Dinesh in front of Writers' Building

On 8 December 1930 Benoy Basu, Badal Gupta and Dinesh Gupta, members of the underground revolutionary group Bengal Volunteers, headed for the Writers' Building. Dressed in European attire, they carried loaded revolvers. Upon entering the building, they shot dead the notorious Inspector General of Police, Colonel N .S. Simpson, infamous for his brutal oppression of political prisoners, most of whom were Indian freedom fighters. After assassinating him, they occupied the building, and soon a gun battle followed in the corridors. Unable to stand up to the numerous forces of the Calcutta police, the trio soon found themselves overpowered and cornered. Unwilling to give themselves up, Badal took potassium cyanide and died instantly, while his comrades shot themselves. Benoy died five days later in hospital but Dinesh survived only to be hanged on 7 July 1931.

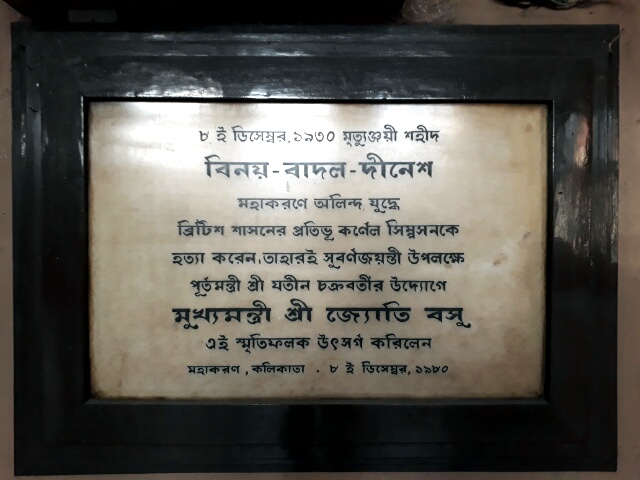
In memory of martyrdom of Benoy, Badal, Dinesh. Writers' Building

Today Dalhousie Square is named after the trio and is called B.B.D. Bagh. A statue of Benoy, Badal and Dinesh stands in front of the Writers' Building, showing Benoy, the group leader, leading his comrades in their final battle.

1945-47: Open courtyards sealed by expansion Due to requirements of huge space, block A, B, C, D, were constructed. As a result, 19314 square feet was added to the building.

Since 1947: Further expansion & Centre of West Bengal politics At the time of India's independence, the building had a large courtyard with seven blocks. Beginning in the mid-1950s, Block E, F was added in the large rectangular courtyards that separated the existing blocks in the back of the building. In the 70s, Block G and CGA were added (adding 17302 square feet on space) to complete the building's final avatar of 13 interconnected blocks making up a literal administrative maze, for the next 4 decades. But only the main block, including the rotunda and five main blocks, are officially classified as heritage structures. The elevation of the building has remained the same overall and the earliest 3-storey structure has been preserved.

=== Statues ===
The giant pediment at the centre is crowned with the statue of Minerva. The terrace also contains several other statues and notable among them are four clusters of statues, christened 'Justice', 'Commerce', 'Science' and 'Agriculture', with the respective Greek gods and goddesses of these four disciplines (Zeus, Hermes, Athena and Demeter respectively) flanked by a European and an Indian practitioner of these vocations.

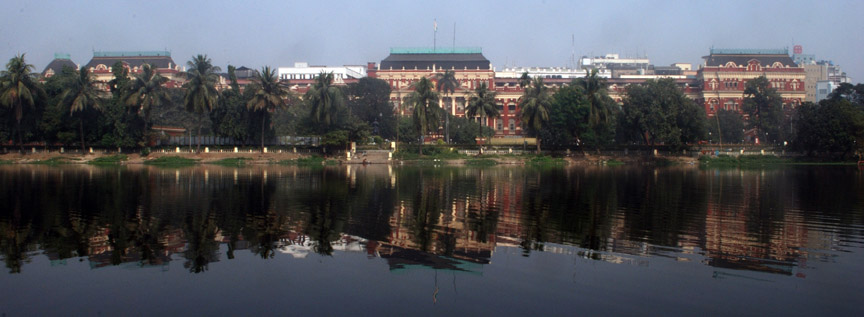
Writers' Building from across Lal Dighi in B.B.D. Bagh

== Renovation ==
The building went under renovation in late 2013, in a project costing ₹2 billion (US$21 million). To facilitate this, the state Secretariat and Chief Minister's office temporarily shifted to an abandoned skyscraper owned by the Hooghly River Bridge Commissioners Office named Nabanna in Howrah. In February 2014, the project was stalled after conservation experts and the West Bengal Public Works Department found the plan submitted by an architect firm insufficient. Meanwhile, a team of Jadavpur University and Indian Institute of Engineering Science and Technology, Shibpur architects was invited to conduct tests of the structure, before the actual renovation could be started.

The renovation efforts also involved the Indian National Trust for Art and Cultural Heritage (INTACH). The team had also sought consultations with heritage conservationists from countries like Australia and Germany before submitting a detailed proposal in late-2015. But even by mid-2016, work on ground had not started due to government indecisiveness and bureaucratic red tape.

Engineers had to fortify the structure before the East West Metro Tunnel, part of the expansion of the Kolkata Metro, was dug past the building in November 2017.

Tenders for civil engineering work in various parts of the main structure were being issued as of end-2018.

== Picture gallery ==
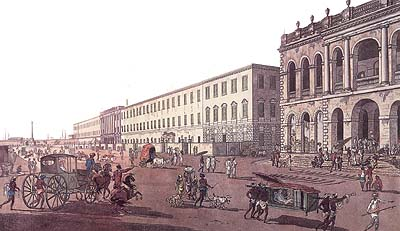
The original building with Holwell's Blackhole incident monument in the background

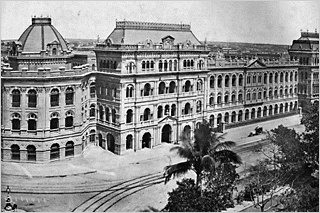
Writers' Building, c. 1915

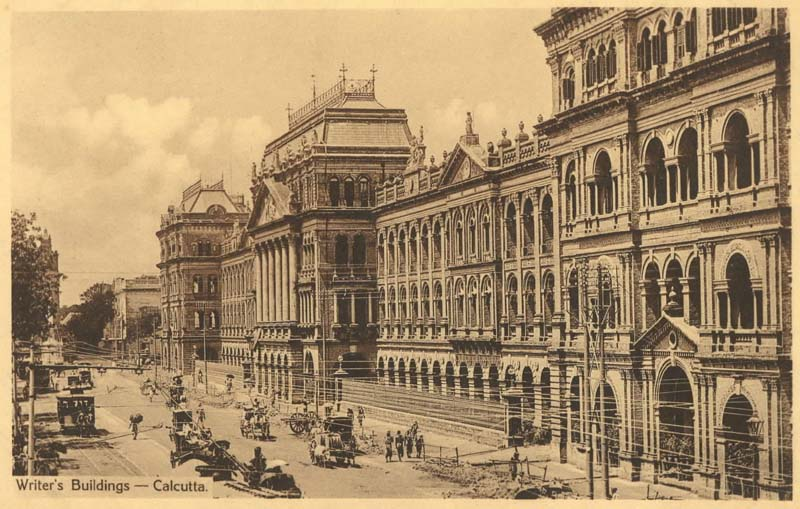
Pre-independence photograph of the facade

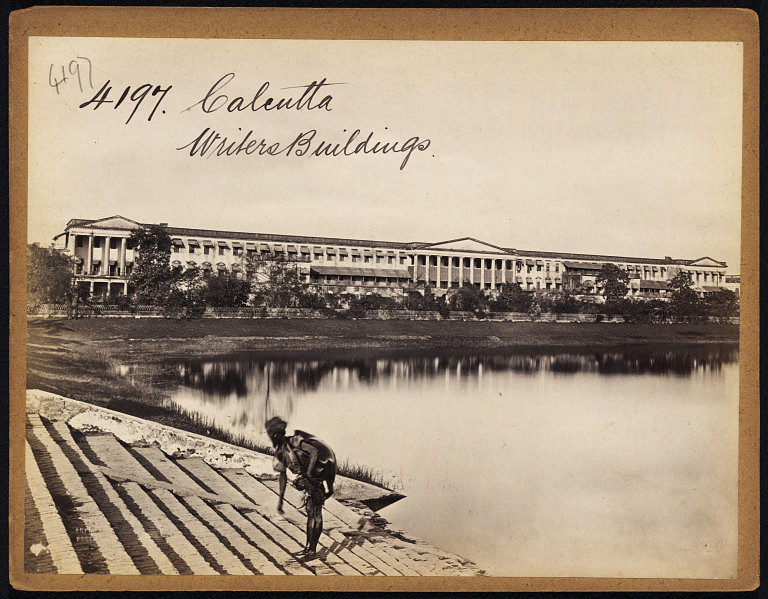
Writers Buildings, Calcutta (Second view)

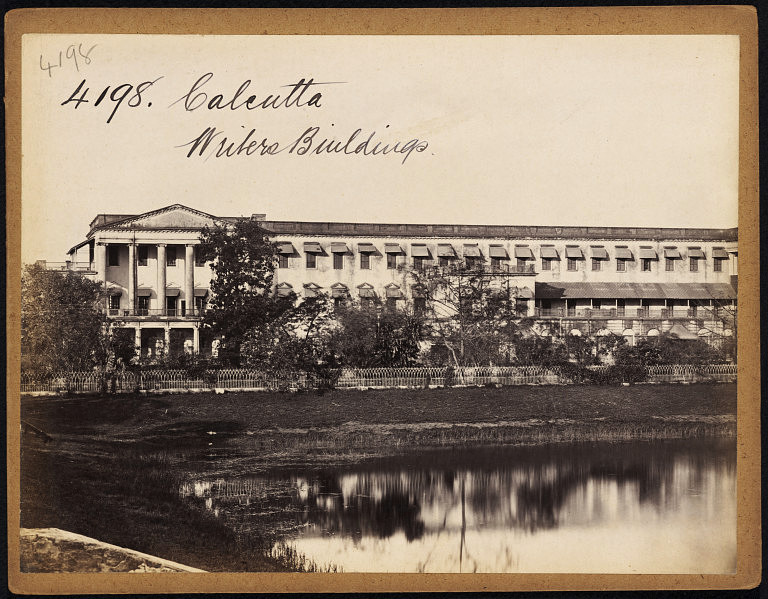
Writers Buildings, Calcutta (Third view)

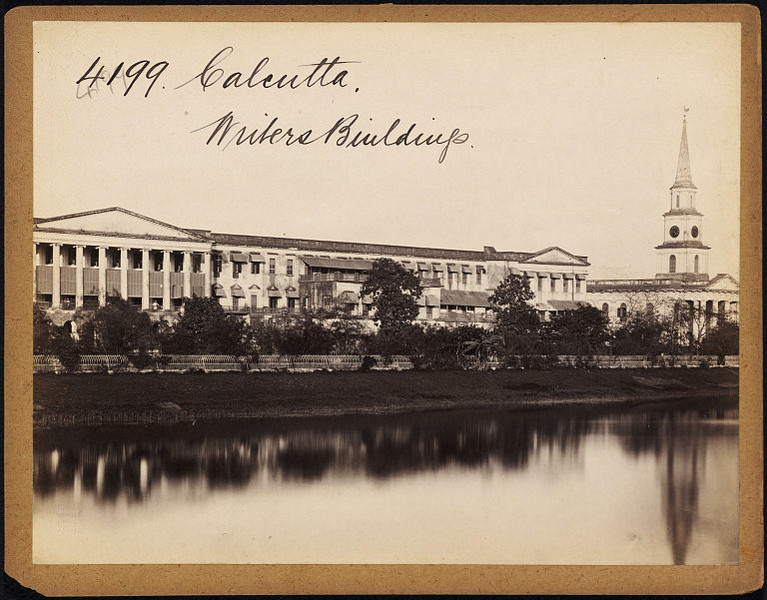
Writers Buildings, Calcutta (Fourth view)

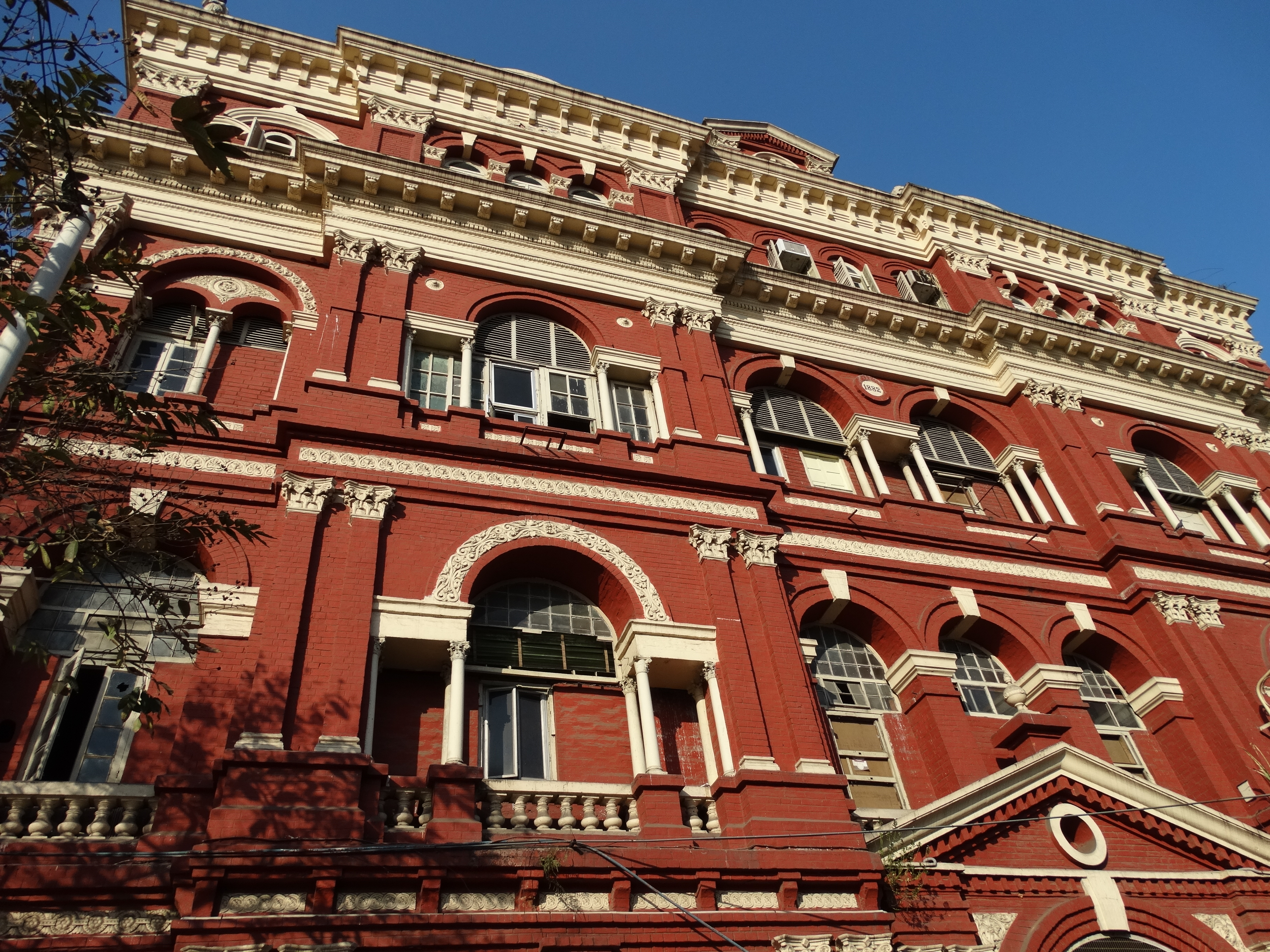
Facade of Writers Building

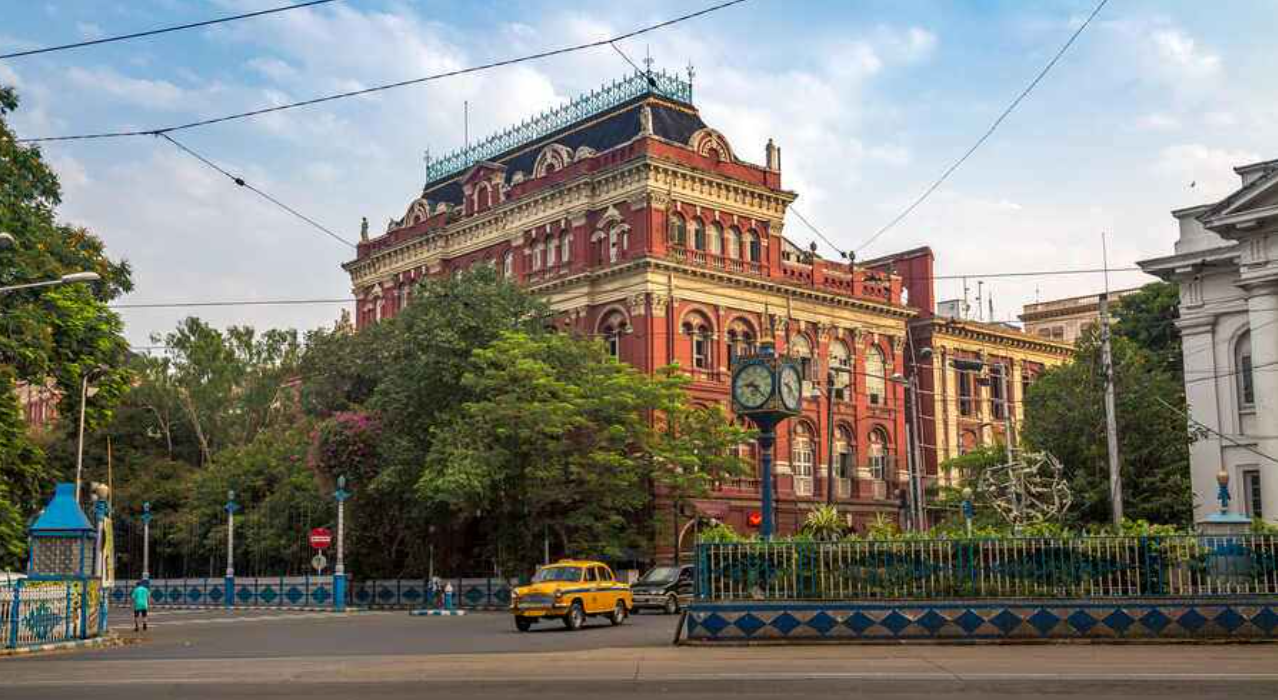
Writers Building
