= Benoy Basu =

Indian revolutionary Hero (1908-1930)

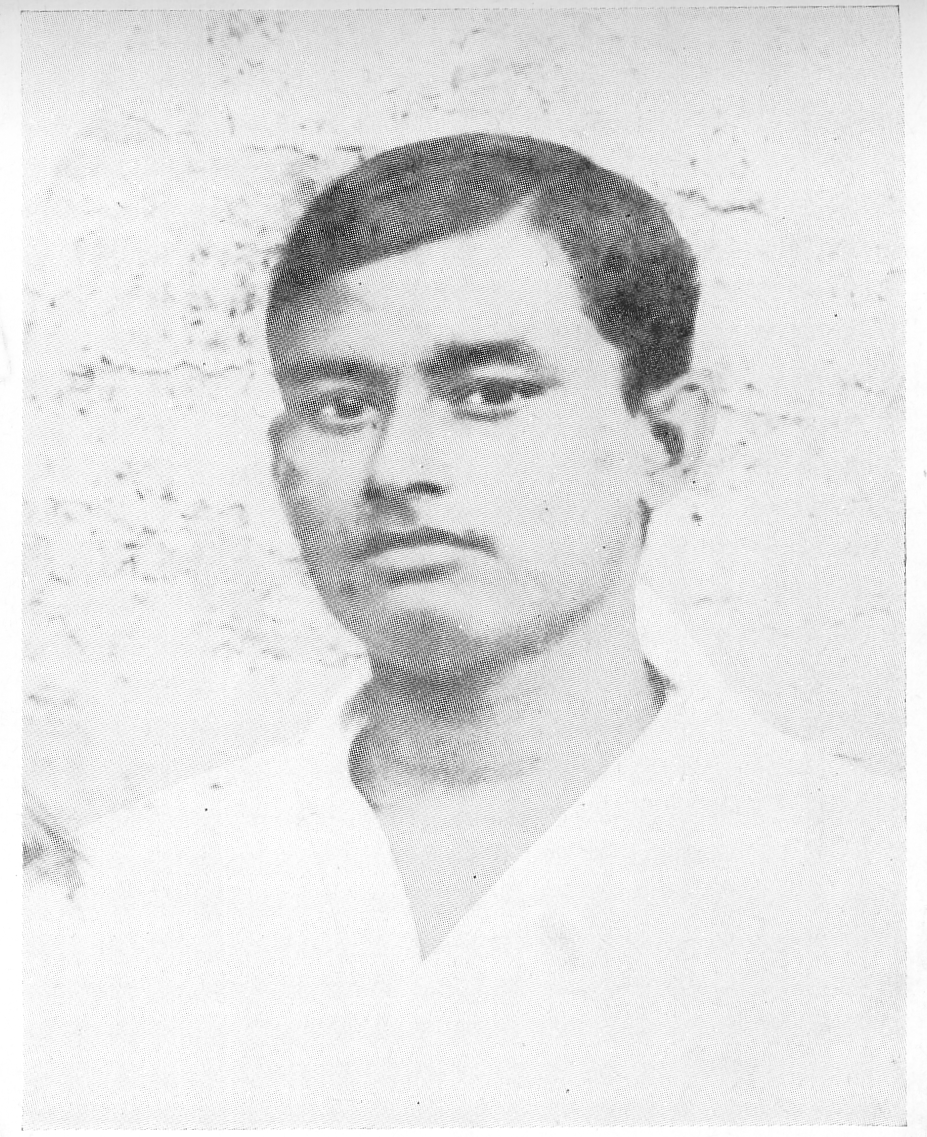
- Freedom fighter Benoy Krishna Bose
- Born: 11 September 1908; Bikrampur, Eastern Bengal and Assam, British India
- Died: 13 December 1930 (aged 22); Calcutta, Bengal, British India
- Other name: Binoy Bose
- Education: Mitford Medical School (now Sir Salimullah Medical College)
- Known for: Writers' Building attack

Benoy Krishna Basu (Bengali: বিনয় কৃষ্ণ বসু Binôe Boshu), Benoy Basu, or Benoy Bose (11 September 1908 – 13 December 1930) was an Indian revolutionary against British rule in India, who launched an attack on the Secretariat Building; the Writers' Building at the Dalhousie square in Kolkata, along with Badal Gupta and Dinesh Chandra Gupta.

== Early life ==
Basu was born on 11 September 1908, in the village Rohitbhog in the Munshiganj District, then in British India. His father, Rebatimohan Basu was an engineer.

Under the profound influence of Hemchandra Ghosh, a veteran revolutionary leader from Dhaka, Basu joined the secret revolutionary society Mukti Sangha, which operated in close alignment with the Jugantar Party. His rising involvement in underground activities forced him to leave his medical education incomplete, trading his stethoscope for a revolver.

== Operation Freedom ==
In 1928, Netaji Subhas Chandra Bose organized the Bengal Volunteers during the Calcutta session of the Indian National Congress. Recognizing its potential, Benoy Basu joined the ranks and promptly set up a highly active local unit in Dhaka. The group devised "Operation Freedom" to actively combat escalating police brutality against political prisoners.

Basu’s first major operation occurred on August 29, 1930. Posing as an absolute insider, he successfully infiltrated the Medical School Hospital in Dhaka and shot dead Lowman, the Inspector General of Police, who was visiting an ailing officer. Basu managed a spectacular escape to Calcutta despite an intense dragnet deployed by the colonial police.

== The Historic Battle of Writers' Building ==
By late 1930, the Bengal Volunteers turned their focus toward the ultimate symbol of colonial authority: the Writers' Building in Dalhousie Square, Calcutta. The specific target was Colonel N.S. Simpson, the notoriously brutal Inspector General of Prisons.

On December 8, 1930, Benoy Basu (aged 22), Badal Gupta (aged 18), and Dinesh Gupta (aged 19) disguised themselves in tailored European attire. They breached the heavy security of the Secretariat building, entered Simpson's office, and shot him dead on the spot.

Photo of injured Benoy Basu,after he attempted to commit suicide by revolver, inside Writer's Building,Kolkata on December 8, 1930.

A fierce, chaotic gunfight quickly erupted in the corridors, known historically as the "Battle of the Corridors." The three young men found themselves heavily outnumbered by British forces led by the Calcutta Police. Refusing to succumb to public humiliation or torture under capture, Badal Gupta immediately consumed potassium cyanide and died on the spot. Dinesh Gupta shot himself, survived the initial wound, but was later tried and executed on July 7, 1931. Benoy turned his revolver on himself, sustaining critical head injuries. He was taken to a local hospital, where he consistently resisted medical help and worsened his own head wounds until he breathed his last at the age of 22 on December 13, 1930.

== Legacy ==
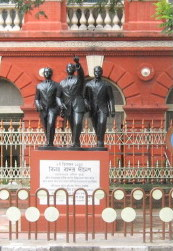
Statue of Benoy-Badal-Dinesh infront of the Writers' Building, Kolkata

The bravery of these three young boys dealt a massive psychological blow to the British Raj, proving that even their most secure administrative strongholds were vulnerable. Following India’s independence, Dalhousie Square was renamed B.B.D. Bagh (Benoy-Badal-Dinesh Bagh) in their honor. Today, a statue commemorating their absolute sacrifice stands proudly in front of the red-brick Writers' Building in Kolkata.

== Bibliography ==
- Hemendranath Dasgupta, Bharater Biplab Kahini, II & III, Calcutta, 1948;
- Ramesh Chandra Majumdar, History of the Freedom Movement in India, III, Calcutta 1963;
- Ganganarayan Chandra, Abismaraniya, Calcutta, 1966.
