= List of Indian independence activists =

The Indian independence movement consisted of efforts by individuals and organizations from a wide spectrum of society to obtain political independence from the British, French and Portuguese rule through the use of many methods. This is a list of individuals who notably campaigned against or are considered to have campaigned against colonial rule on the Indian subcontinent.

Post-independence, the term "freedom fighter" was officially recognized by the Indian government for those who took part in the movement; people in this category (which can also include dependent family members) receive pensions and other benefits such as Special Railway Counters.

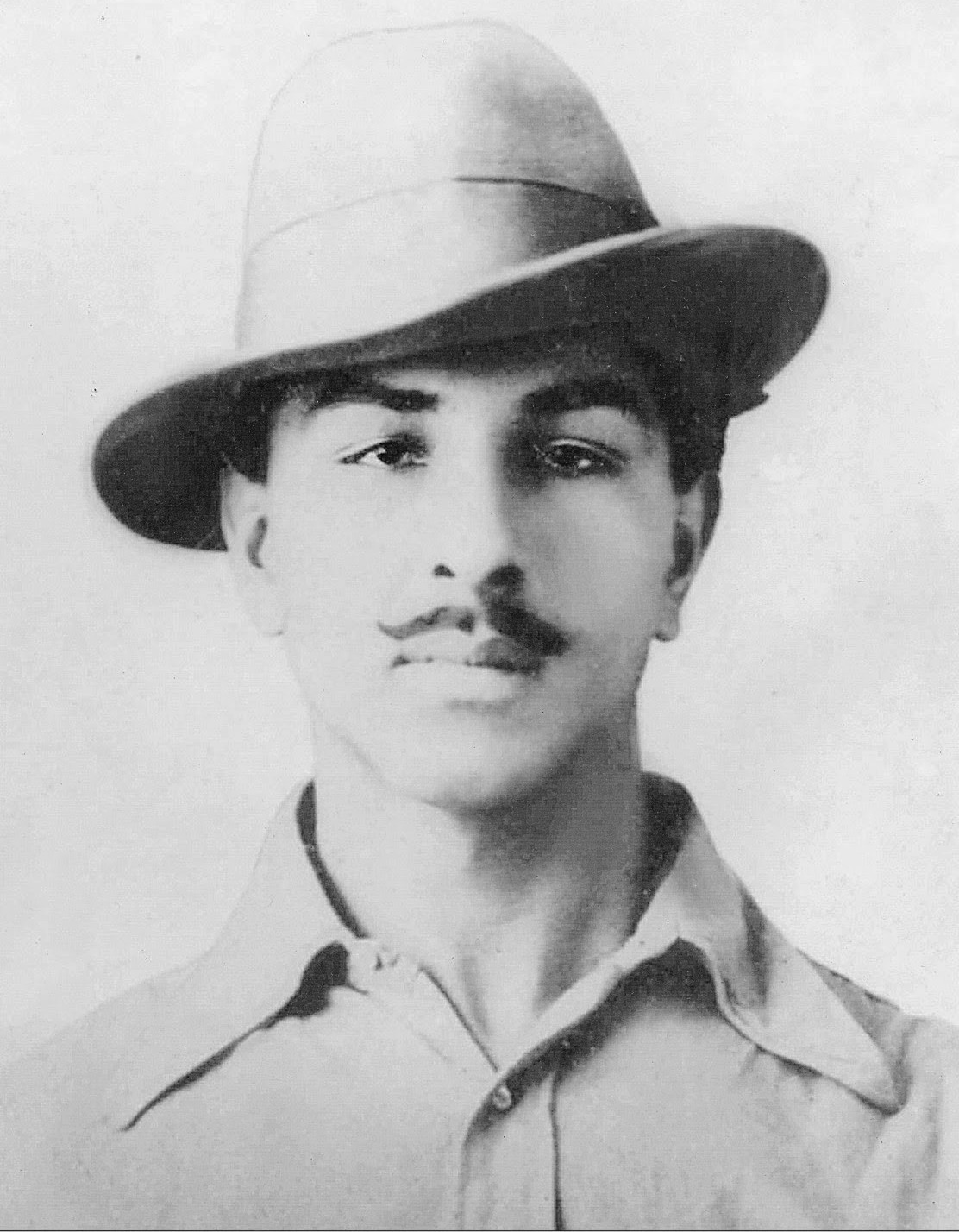
Bhagat Singh

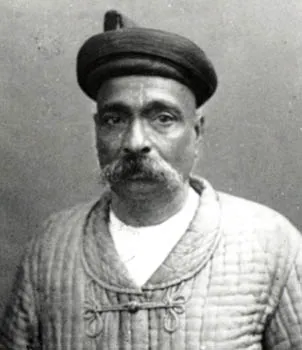
Bal Gangadhar Tilak

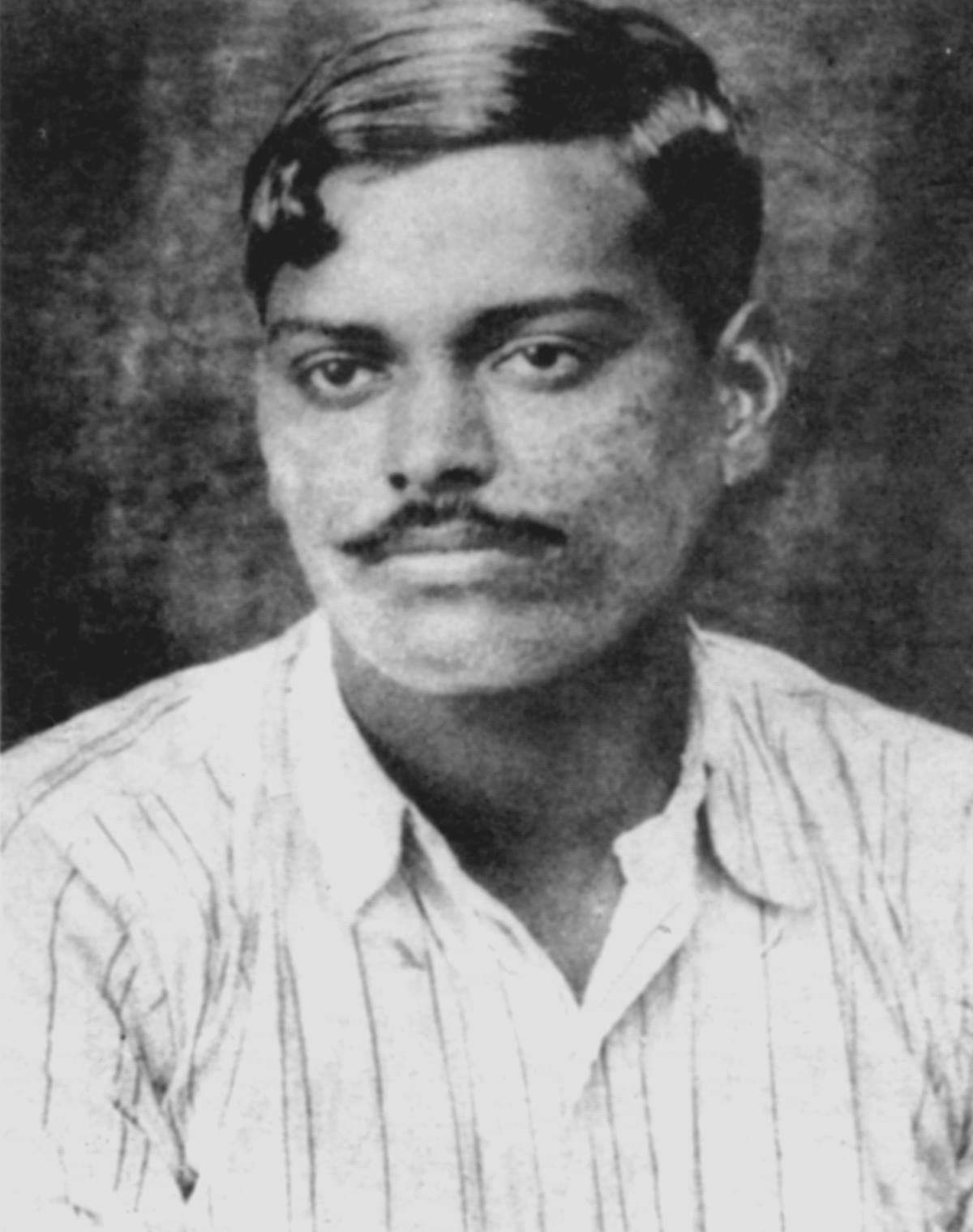
Chandra Shekhar Azad

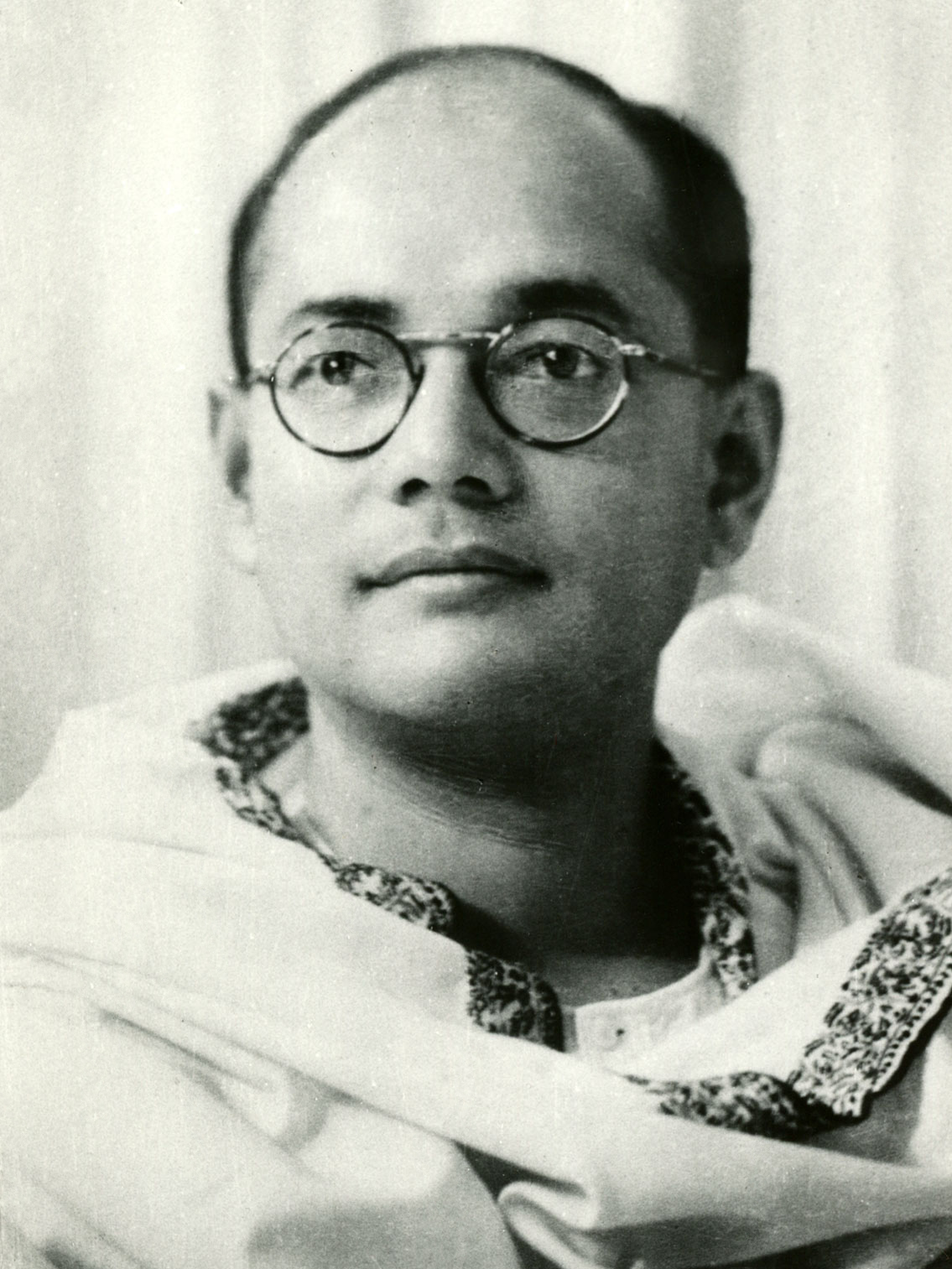
Subhas Chandra Bose

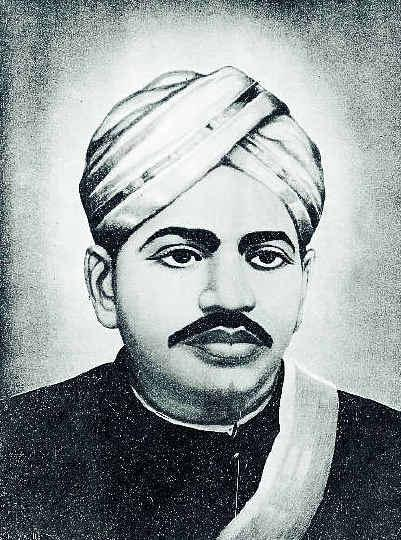
V.O. Chidambaram Pillai

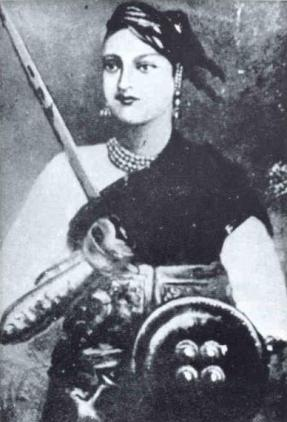
Rani of Jhansi

== List ==
=== A ===
Name	Activity	Ref.
Ambika Chakrabarty	A revolutionary, he took part in the Chittagong armoury raid.	
Alluri Sitarama Raju	He led the Rampa Rebellion of 1922.	
Amarendranath Chatterjee	A revolutionary, he raised funds and took part in the Indo-German Conspiracy.	
Anant Laxman Kanhere	A revolutionary assassin, he was executed by the colonial government for the murder of a British officer A. M. T. Jackson.	
Anant Maral Shastri	He participated in the Quit India Movement and used his writings to inspire nationalistic sentiments. As a journalist, he worked with several newspapers to spread awareness against British rule.	
Ananta Singh	A revolutionary, he participated in the Chittagong armoury raid.	
Anjana Devi Chaudhry	She was the first woman from Rajasthan to be arrested during the freedom struggle. She was also involved in the Bijolia movement and led a procession of 500 women in Bijolia	
Anugrah Narayan Sinha	A prominent revolutionary from Bihar known as Bihar Vibhuti. He was a Gandhian and participated in Champaran Satyagraha in 1917.	
Atulkrishna Ghosh	A revolutionary, he took part in the Indo-German Conspiracy.	
Swatantryaveer Nanasaheb Dhapte	Freedom fighter Nivritti Nanasaheb Dhapate was born in 1908 into the Kshatriya Shegar Dhangar community in Korhale Budruk village, Baramati taluka. He played an active role in India's freedom struggle alongside other freedom fighters from Korhale village. After witnessing the nation achieve independence, he breathed his last in free India in 1977.	

=== B ===
Name	Activity	Ref.
Babu Bhoop Singh	Ruler of Kohra (estate) and leader in the Indian Rebellion of 1857.	
Badal Gupta	A revolutionary, he died in an attack on police at Writers' Building.	
Bagha Jatin	A founding member of Anushilan Samiti, convicted in the Howrah-Sibpur conspiracy case and a participant in the Indo-German Conspiracy.	
Baldev Ram Mirdha	He mobilised farmers against British colonial and feudal policies through the Kisan Sabha.	
Baikuntha Shukla	A revolutionary, he was executed for murdering a government witness.	
Bal Gangadhar Tilak	A nationalist, he campaigned for Swaraj (self-rule).	
Begum Hazrat Mahal	Also known as the Begum of Awadh, she was the second wife of Nawab of Awadh Wajid Ali Shah, and the regent of Awadh in 1857–1858. She is known for the leading role she had in the rebellion against the British East India Company during the Indian Rebellion of 1857.	
Bankim Chandra Chatterjee	A nationalist, he wrote Vande Mataram which inspired many activists and became the national song of India.	
Barindra Kumar Ghosh	A revolutionary organizer, he was convicted in the Alipore bomb case.	
Basawon Singh	An activist, he was convicted in the Lahore Conspiracy Case trial.	
Batukeshwar Dutt	An Indian revolutionary participating in an armed struggle against British rule in India, he threw a bomb in the Central Assembly in 1929.	
Benoy Basu	A revolutionary, he died following an attack on police at Writers' Building.	
Bhabini Mahato	A freedom fighter and activist who participated in the Quit India Movement of 1942 and the Bengali Language Movement (Manbhum).	
Boyi Bhimanna	A celebrated Telugu poet, scholar, and social reformer from Andhra Pradesh who actively participated in the Quit India Movement (1942). He used his nationalist literature to fight against British rule and dedicated his career to social justice and Dalit empowerment.	
Bhagat Singh	A socialist, anarchist and Marxist revolutionary who worked with several revolutionary organisations and became prominent in the Hindustan Socialist Republican Association (HSRA).	
Bhagwati Charan Vohra	A revolutionary ideologue and bomb-maker, he wrote the article "The Philosophy of Bomb".	
Bhavabhushan Mitra	Ghadar Mutiny	
Bhikaiji Cama	Bhikaiji Cama was born in Bombay (now Mumbai) in a large, affluent Parsi Zoroastrian family. While in London recovering from the plague, she met Dadabhai Naoroji, then president of the British Committee of the Indian National Congress, and for whom she came to work as private secretary. Together with Naoroji and Singh Rewabhai Rana, Cama supported the founding of Varma's Indian Home Rule Society in February 1905. She was denied re-entry to India after refusing to sign a statement pledging she would not participate in nationalist activities and, while in exile, Cama wrote, published (in the Netherlands and Switzerland) and distributed revolutionary literature for the movement, including Bande Mataram (founded in response to the Crown ban on the poem Vande Mataram) and later Madan's Talwar (in response to the execution of Madan Lal Dhingra). These weeklies were smuggled into India through the French colony of Pondichéry. On 22 August 1907, Cama attended the second Socialist Congress at Stuttgart, Germany, where she described the devastating effects of a famine that had struck the Indian subcontinent. In her appeal for human rights, equality and for autonomy from Great Britain, she unfurled what she called the "Flag of Indian Independence". (Note: "This flag is of India's independence. Behold, it is born. It is already sanctified by the blood of martyred Indian youth. I call upon you, gentlemen, to rise and salute the flag of Indian independence. In the name of this flag, I appeal to lovers of freedom all over the world to cooperate with this flag in freeing one-fifth of the human race.")	
Bhupendranath Datta	A revolutionary, he was editor of newspaper Jugantar Patrika.	
Bhupendra Kumar Datta	A revolutionary, editor of the publications of Anushilan Samiti.	
Bina Das	A revolutionary, she attempted to assassinate Bengal Governor Stanley Jackson.	
Binod Bihari Chowdhury	A revolutionary, he took part in the Chittagong armoury raid.	
Bipin Chandra Pal	A staunch nationalist, he was a founding member of the swadeshi movement and campaigned for complete Swaraj Swadeshi movement. Pal is known as the Father of Revolutionary Thoughts in India and was one of the freedom fighters of India.Bipin Chandra Pal made a strong plea for repeal of the Arms Act which was discriminatory in nature. Along with Lala Lajpat Rai and Bal Gangadhar Tilak he belonged to the Lal-Bal-Pal trio that was associated with revolutionary activity. Sri Aurobindo Ghosh and Pal were recognised as the chief exponents of a new national movement revolving around the ideals of Purna Swaraj, Swadeshi, boycott and national education. His programme consisted of Swadeshi, boycott and national education. He preached and encouraged the use of Swadeshi and the boycott of foreign goods to eradicate poverty and unemployment. He wanted to remove social evils from the form and arouse the feelings of nationalism through national criticism.	
Birsa Munda	A tribal leader and freedom fighter, he led the Munda uprising (Ulgulan) against the British rule and exploitative landlords in the late 19th century. He is remembered as a symbol of resistance and tribal rights in India.	

=== C ===
Name	Activity	Ref.
Chandrashekhar Azad	Indian revolutionary who reorganised the Hindustan Republican Association (HRA) under its new name of Hindustan Socialist Republican Association (HSRA) after the death of its founder, Ram Prasad Bismil, and three other prominent party leaders, Roshan Singh, Rajendra Nath Lahiri and Ashfaqulla Khan.	
Chaudhary Charan Singh	Singh followed Gandhi in non-violent struggle for independence from the British government and was imprisoned several times and later founded his own party Lok Dal.	
Chaudhary Mohar Singh	He was a rebel in the Indian Rebellion of 1857. He along with Thana Bhawan Saiyed Pathans captured the Shamli tehsil from British rule for six months	
Chittaranjan Das	He founded the Swaraj Party and became the leader of the Non-cooperation Movement in Bengal.	
C. Rajagopalachari	A nationalist leader, lawyer and close associate of Mahatma Gandhi, he participated in the Non-cooperation movement (1919-1922) and led the Vedaranyam March in 1930. He later became the last Governor-General of India and founder of the Swatantra Party	
Chowdary Satyanarayana	He was an Indian freedom fighter, anti-colonial nationalist, politician, legislature in Andhra Pradesh Assembly (1955–62, 1967–72) and a human rights activist.	

=== D ===
Name	Activity	Ref.
Dadabhai Naoroji	Known as the Grand Old Man of India, Dadabhai Naoroji was born in Navsari, Gujarat within a Parsi Zoroastrian family. He was an Indian political leader, merchant, scholar and writer who was a Liberal Party Member of Parliament in the United Kingdom House of Commons between 1892 and 1895 and the first Asian to be a British MP, other than the Anglo-Indian MP David Ochterlony Dyce Sombre, who was disenfranchised for corruption after nine months in office. Naoroji is renowned for his work in the Indian National Congress, of which he was one of the founding members and thrice — in 1886, 1893, and 1906 — elected president. Dadabhai Naoroji is regarded as one of the most important Indians during the birth of the nascent independence movement. In his writings, he came to the conclusion that the exertion of foreign rule over India was not favourable for the nation, and that independence (or at the very least, responsible government) would be the better path for India.	
Damodaram Sanjivayya	A prominent statesman, political leader, and freedom fighter from Andhra Pradesh who actively participated in the Indian independence movement during his student days. Known for his upright character, he went on to become the first Dalit Chief Minister of an Indian state and served as a Union Cabinet Minister.	
Dhan Singh Gurjar	He was the police chief of Meerut, who participated in the 1857 rebellion and led initial actions against the British East India Company in Meerut.	
Dheeran Chinnamalai	An indigenous governor, he took part in guerrilla warfare against the British East India Company.	
Dinesh Gupta	A revolutionary, he was executed following an attack on police at Writers' Building.	
Durgawati Devi	A revolutionary, she helped operate a bomb factory.	

=== G ===
Name	Activity	Ref.
Ganesh Damodar Savarkar	Founder of the Abhinav Bharat Society. He led an armed movement against the British colonial government in India, he was sentenced to transportation for life as a result. Was the brother of Vinayak Damodar Savarkar.	
Ganesh Ghosh	A revolutionary, he participated in the Chittagong armoury raid.	
Gopal Krishna Gokhale	A moderate nationalist and social reformer, he advocated constitutional reform, expanded education, and greater Indian representation in government. He founded the Servants of India Society and was an important mentor to Mahatma Gandhi	
Gopal Mukund Huddar	An anti-colonial activist and anti-fascist soldier, Huddar conducted an armed robbery in 1931 to fund clandestine revolutionary activities.	
Gopinath Bordoloi	He met Jawaharlal Nehru in England in 1925. He joined the Indian National Congress and actively participated in the Indian Freedom Movement. In 1942 he was arrested during the Quit India Movement and sentenced to 3+1/2 years imprisonment. He was the first Chief Minister of undivided Assam. He died in 1950.	

=== H ===
Name	Activity	Ref.
Habib ur Rahman	He was an army officer in the Indian National Army (INA) who was charged with "waging war against His Majesty the King Emperor". He served as Subhas Chandra Bose's chief of staff in Singapore, and accompanied Bose on his last fatal flight from Taipei to Tokyo, sharing the last moments of his life.	
Seth Harchandrai Vishandas	A Sindhi politician and influential mayor of Karachi, he fought for Muslim-Hindu unity and the independence movement, particularly in opposing the Simon Commission of 1912. He died while travelling (against doctor's advice) to vote for its boycott.	
Hare Krishna Konar	A revolutionary, founder of Communist Consolidation in Andaman Cellular Jail. It is a Nationalist organisation to uproot British Raj from India.	
Hemchandra Kanungo	A nationalist, convicted in the Alipore bomb case.	
Hemu Kalani	A student revolutionary who was executed for attempted rail sabotage.	

=== I ===
Name	Activity	Ref.
Inayatullah Khan Mashriqi	He founded the Khaksar Movement in British India.	

=== J ===
Name	Activity	Ref.
Jagjivan Ram	Babuji, as he was commonly called, was a politician and Indian independence activist from Bihar. After playing a key role in the establishment of the All India Depressed Classes League in 1935, he went on to develop the rural labour movement and was elected to the Bihar Legislative Assembly in 1937. The league was devoted to achieving equality for untouchables.	
Jatindra Nath Das	An activist and revolutionary, he died during a hunger strike while awaiting trial for the Lahore conspiracy case.	
Jawahar Lal Nehru	An activist, he campaigned for independence and became India's first prime minister.	
Jayi Rajaguru	A prominent figure of the Indian independence movement in the state of Odisha.	
Jogesh Chandra Chatterjee	A revolutionary, he was imprisoned for the Kakori conspiracy.	

=== K ===
Name	Activity	Ref.
Kali Charan Banerjee	A Bengali Christian politician, he regularly addressed the Indian National Congress annual sessions in moulding the policy of national movement.	
Kalpana Datta	Involved in the Indian Independence Movement; also part of the Chittagong armoury raid planning.	
Kamal Nath Tewari	He was a freedom fighter and after independence he was elected as Member of Parliament from Bagaha (Now Valmikinagar) and Bettiah (Now Paschimi Champaran) Constituency respectively he was also in the panel of LokSabha Speaker and was the president of Estimate Committee.	
Kamla Beniwal	She participated in Quit India Movement at the age of 15. She was awarded with the Tamra Patra by former prime minister Indira Gandhi.	
Kanneganti Hanumanthu	A freedom fighter and farmer leader who spearheaded the Palnadu Rebellion. As a part of the non-cooperation movement, Hanumanthu mobilised people to not pay the Pullari tax and organised a social boycott of British officials. Under the leadership of Hanumanthu, the Chenchus of Nallamalla Hills fought against the British as a part of Palnadu forest satyagraha in 1921-22. Executed by a firing squad of British Indian police.	
K. Kamaraj	He was a freedom fighter and after independence he became as chief minister of Tamil Nadu and his rule for 9 years was the golden rule of Tamil Nadu.	
Kartar Singh Sarabha	A revolutionary, he helped with the Ghadar Party paper and the attempted Ghadar Mutiny.	
Khudiram Bose	One of the youngest revolutionary martyrs, he was executed following an attempted assassination bombing which accidentally killed two bystanders instead of his intended target, the Viceroy of Bengal.	
Kittur Chennamma	An Indian freedom fighter and rani of the Kittur, a former princely state in Karnataka. She led an armed force against the British East India Company in 1824 in defiance of the doctrine of lapse in an attempt to maintain Indian control over the region, but was defeated in the third war and died in prison.	
Komaram Bheem	A tribal leader, he fought for the liberation of Hyderabad.	
Krishnaji Gopal Karve	A revolutionary, he was executed as an accomplice to the murder of A. M. T. Jackson.	
Babu Kunwar Singh	A Rajput military commander in the Indian Rebellion of 1857.	
Kushal Konwar	An organizer of the Quit India movement, he was judged the mastermind of a troop train derailment and hanged.	

=== L ===
Name	Activity	Ref.
Lala Lajpat Rai	A staunch nationalist, he was a founding member of the swadeshi movement and campaigned for complete Swaraj Swadeshi movement.	
Lal Bahadur Shastri	He studied in East Central Railway Inter college and Harish Chandra High School, which he left to join the non-cooperation Movement. He worked for the betterment of the Harijan at Muzaffarpur and dropped his caste-derived surname of "Srivastava". Shastri's thoughts were influenced by reading about Swami Vivekanand, Mahatma Gandhi and Annie Besant. Deeply impressed and influenced by Gandhi, he joined the Indian Independence movement in the 1920s. He served as the president of Servants of the People Society (Lok Sevak Mandal), founded by Lala Lajpat Rai and held prominent positions in the Indian National Congress. Following independence in 1947, he joined the Indian government and became one of Prime Minister Nehru's key cabinet colleagues, first as Railways Minister (1951–56), and then in numerous other prominent positions, including the Home Minister.	
Lokenath Bal	A revolutionary, he participated in the Chittagong armoury raid.	
Laxman Jha	Revoluted against the Simon Commission and participated in the Civil Disobedience Movement during 1930–31 at the age of 15. After the arrest of Rajendra Prasad, he became the General Secretary of the Bihar State Movement Committee to lead the August Revolution. Joined Bharat Chhodo movement for the freedom of India from the British rule	

=== M ===
Name	Activity	Ref.
Madhusudan Das	A leader, popularly known as "Utkal Gourab". He was the first graduate and advocate of Odisha.	
Maghfoor Ahmad Ajazi	Left studies on call of Mahatma Gandhi and joined the Non-Cooperation Movement in the year 1921. Founded All India Jamhur Muslim League in 1940 to counter the Lahore resolution, passed by the All-India Muslim League, for a separate Pakistan based on Muhammad Ali Jinnah's Two nation theory.	
Mahmud Hasan Deobandi	He and his students launched the Silk Letter Movement and laid the foundation of Jamia Millia Islamia on 29 October 1920.	
Mangal Pandey	He rebelled against his British Indian army commanders and was executed.	
Manmath Nath Gupta	A member of the HRA, he took part in the Kakori conspiracy.	
Matangini Hazra	An activist with the Quit India Movement, she was fatally shot by British Indian police.	
Maulvi Liaquat Ali	A leader of the Sepoy Mutiny, he captured Khusro Bagh in Allahabad and declared the independence of India.	
Maveeran Alagumuthu Kone	He is the First Freedom Fighter from Kattalankulam in Thoothukudi District, was an early Chieftain and freedom fighter against the British presence in Tamil Nadu. Born into a yadav community family, he became a military leader in the town of Ettayapuram, and was defeated in battle there against the British and Maruthanayagam's forces. He was executed in 1759 In his memory, the government of Tamil Nadu conducts a Pooja ceremony every year on 11 July. A documentary film based on his life was released in 2012.	
Mohammad Farooq Chishti	Coming from an affluent Zamindar family, a leading Independence Activist from Eastern part of Uttar Pradesh. Mr. Chishti fought for the independence of India, actively participated in Quit India Movement and was jailed many times. He strongly opposed Jinnah's two nation theory and rejected his offer many times for ministerial positions in Pakistani Government brought by Raja of Salempur, he dedicated his life to help the underprivileged and economically backward people of India.	
Maulana Mazharul Haque	He was an educator, lawyer, independence activist and freedom fighter of the Indian National Movement. A stamp was issued in his honour by the Indian Postal Service in 1981 and in 1998.	
Mohandas Karamchand Gandhi	He was a lawyer, independence activist and freedom fighter of the Indian National Movement. He is known as Father of Nation.	
Mithuben Petit	Hailing from the Parsi Zoroastrian community, Mithuben Petit was a female activist in the Indian independence movement, who famously participated in Mahatma Gandhi's Dandi March. Petit along with Mahatma Gandhi's wife, Kasturba Gandhi, and Sarojini Naidu played a major part in the Salt March, with Kasturba Gandhi beginning the march at Sabarmati, Sarojini Naidu lifting the salt for the first time at Dandi on 6 April 1930 and Petit standing behind Mahatma Gandhi when he repeated the violation at Bhimrad on 9 April 1930. The march was one of the most important event in the Indian independence movement. In a time when women were required to take a back seat (due to the patriarchal culture at that time in India), Petit was one of the three women who played a pivotal role in the march and the civil disobedience against tax on salt. Petit participated in the Bardoli Satyagraha of 1928 which was a no-tax campaign against the British Raj where she worked under the guidance of Sardar Patel.	
Mufti Abdul Razzaq	He participated in the freedom struggle taking part in a fight against the British near Bhopal's Qazi camp.	
Mukhtar Ahmed Ansari	During the Indian Independence Movement, he served as the president of both the Indian National Congress and the Muslim League. He was a political figure and patriot from India. He was one of Jamia Millia Islamia University's founders.	

=== P ===
Name	Activity	Ref.
Pazhassi Raja	He used guerrilla warfare to fight the British in the Cotiote War (Kottayathu war, 1793–1805) to preserve the independence of his kingdom. He was killed at Mavila Thodu at the present Kerala-Karnataka border.	
Pir of Pagaro VI	A spiritual leader of the Hurs during the Indian independence movement	
Ponaka Kanakamma	A social worker, activist and freedom fighter, she was a disciple of Mahatma Gandhi.	
Prabhavati Devi	A Gandhian leader, she was the wife of activist Jayaprakash Narayan.	
Prafulla Chaki	A revolutionary, he killed two innocents in a mistargetted assassination bombing.	
Pravanalini Bhandari	A revolutionary, she participated in the Salt March.	
Pritilata Waddedar	A Bengali revolutionary, she led the attack on the European Club in Pahartali and committed suicide to avoid capture.	
Puli Thevar	He is notable for leading a revolt against Company rule at 1757 in India.he was the first Indian to fight against the British.	
Pasumpon Muthuramalinga Thevar	A leader of the socialist All India Forward Bloc, he was arrested and jailed by the British.	

=== R ===
Name	Activity	Ref.
Radhanath Rath	He played a vital role in the freedom struggle by creating public opinion against the British government through his writings in 'samaja'.	
Raja Nahar Singh	A Great Jat Ruler of the princely state of Ballabhgarh, he had secured the road from Delhi Gate (Delhi) to Bhadrapur (Bharatpur), who drove the British away from the parganas of Pali (Rajasthan), Palwal and Fatehpur.	
Rajendra Lahiri	A revolutionary, he participated in the Kakori conspiracy.	
Rambriksh Benipuri	He was a writer in Hindi, an editor for Socialist Leader, and a liberation fighter.	
Ram Lakhan Singh Yadav	A veteran freedom fighter, Shri Yadav participated in India's freedom struggle.	
Ram Prasad Bismil	The founder of the HRA, he led the Kakori conspiracy in an attempt to raise funds for revolutionary operations.	
Ramesh Chandra Jha	A poet and veteran freedom fighter, he actively participated and fought for independence during Quit India movement of 1942.	
Rani of Jhansi	One of the Pivotal Leaders of the First war of Independence of 1857.	
Rash Behari Bose	A revolutionary, he helped form the Indian National Army in Imperial Japan.	
Rosamma Punnoose	An activist, she campaigned for independence.	
Roshan Singh	A revolutionary who was among those executed for the Kakori conspiracy, though he had not taken part in it.	

=== S ===
Name	Activity	Ref.
Subhas Chandra Bose	A nationalist, he founded the Indian Legion in Nazi Germany and revamped the Indian National Army in Imperial Japan.	
S. Satyamurti	A politician, he campaigned for independence.	
Saadat Bano	Independence activist and poet, married to Saifuddin Kitchlew	
Sachindra Bakshi	A member of the HRA, he took part in the Kakori conspiracy.	
Saifuddin Kitchlew	Independence activist, barrister, politician, and leader of the peace movement, married to Saadat Bano	
Sangolli Rayanna	Born in into the Kshatriya kuruba-dhangar caste. The army chief of Kittur, who fought the British East India Company until his death.	
Sardar Vallabhbhai Patel	The Iron man of India, he fought for independence and Unified India into one sovereign Nation .	
Sarojini Naidu	An activist, she called for independence in her writing and was a major figure of the civil disobedience movement.	
Shambhu Dutt Sharma	A former British Indian Army officer, he joined the Quit India Movement in 1942.	
Shivaram Rajguru	A revolutionary, he was an HSRA member and assassinated a British police officer in the Indian Imperial Police.	
Shyamji Krishna Varma	A nationalist, he founded the Indian Home Rule Society, India House and The Indian Sociologist in London.	
Sri Aurobindo	A nationalist, he was arrested for leading the Alipore bomb conspiracy.	
Subodh Roy	A revolutionary, he took part in the Chittagong armoury raid and later the Tebhaga movement.	
Subramania Bharati	A writer and activist who created many patriotic and nationalistic songs during the independence movement.	
Sukhdev Thapar	A revolutionary, he was a senior member of HSRA and participated in several actions before his execution.	
Surendranath Tagore	A nationalist, he served as treasurer of the Anushilan Samiti.	
Surya Sen	President of INC Chittagong Branch, he led the Chittagong armoury raid.	
Sushila Chain Trehan	An activist, she was a leading member of Arya Samaj and also fought for women's rights.	
Sushila Didi	A revolutionary, participated in the Civil Disobedience Movement under the pseudonym of 'Indumati' and was arrested.	
Swami Shraddhanand	An activist, he started a protest in front of a posse of Gurkha soldiers at the Clock Tower in Chandni Chowk.	

=== T ===
Name	Activity	Ref.
Tanguturi Prakasam Pantulu	An Indian politician, he became known as "Andhra Kesari" (lion of Andhra) for leading protests against the Simon Commission in Madras.	
Tara Rani Srivastava	An activist, she was part of the Quit India Movement.	
Tatya Tope	A notable commander in the Indian Rebellion of 1857.	
Titumir	A freedom fighter who led a campaign against British rule during the 19th century, he eventually built a bamboo fort in Narikelberia village which became the subject of Bengali folk legend. Titumir died of wounds following the storming of the fort by British soldiers.	
Titusji	An activist, he was among the 78 marchers selected by Mahatma Gandhi to take part in the 1930 Salt March.	
T. V. Thomas	One of the first generation trade union leaders in Kerala and was actively involved in the Indian independence movement.	
Tileswari Barua	A 12 year old girl and one of the youngest martyrs; shot by Britishers while trying to raise the indian Flag at the dhekiajuli police station in the 1942 quit India Movement	

=== U ===
Name	Activity	Ref.
Ubaidullah Sindhi	An activist, he sought independence through foreign alliance in the Silk Letter Movement.	
Udham Singh	A revolutionary assassin, he was executed for the Caxton Hall shooting.	
Ullaskar Dutta	A revolutionary bomb-maker, he was convicted in the Alipore bomb case.	
Ulloor Gopi	A freedom fighter from Kerala. Born in a rich aristocratic family, Ulloor Gopi was drawn towards the national struggle by socialist thoughts. He was arrested five times by the British, in Quit India Movement his contributions could be called historical.	
Umaji Naik Khomane	Umaji was the first Ramoshi Freedom Fighter who fought against British Council. Umaji Naik, known honorifically as Vishwa Krantiveer Narveer Raje Umaji Naik (7 September 1791 – 3 February 1832), was an Indian revolutionary who challenged the British rule in India around 1826 to 1832. He was one of the earliest freedom fighter of India. He fought against East India company and company rule	
Uyyalawada Narasimha Reddy	He led an uprising in Andhra Pradesh in 1846 and was executed by the British.	
Uzair Gul Peshawari	An activist, he was imprisoned for the Silk Letter Movement.	

=== V ===
Name	Activity	Ref.
V. O. Chidambaram Pillai	A hardline politician of the Indian National Congress (INC), he launched the Swadeshi Steam Navigation Company in defiance of the British trade monopoly.	
Vanchinathan	A revolutionary assassin, he committed suicide after killing a British colonial administrator and tax collector, Robert Ashe.	
Vasakha Singh Dadehar	A Gadhari revolutionary played a role in organizing armed rebellion against British rule. Arrested in Lahore Conspiracy case.	
Vasudev Balwant Phadke	A Ramoshi revolutionary, he organized an insurgent group against British rule.	
Variyan Kunnathu Kunjahammed Haji	He seized control of a large area from the British rule and set up a parallel government of his Malayalam State in Malabar, named 'Malayala Rajyam' and now part of the Kerala State	
Velu Nachiyar	She was a queen of Sivaganga estate from c. 1780–1790. She was the first Indian queen to wage war with the East India Company in India.She is known by Tamils as Veeramangai ("brave woman").	
Veerapandiya Kattabomman	He refused to accept the sovereignty of the British East India Company and waged a war against the British.	
Vemula Kurmayya	A prominent leader and social reformer from Andhra Pradesh who participated in the Non-Cooperation Movement (1921), the Civil Disobedience Movement (1930), and the Individual Satyagraha (1940), facing multiple imprisonments. He trained at Mahatma Gandhi's Sabarmati Ashram (1925–1927) to learn khadi spinning as a form of peaceful resistance, and he dedicated his life to Dalit upliftment and rights.	
Vinayak Damodar Savarkar	He was an Independence activist, politician and a Hindu Nationalist. He published books advocating complete Indian independence by revolutionary means. One of the books he published called The Indian War of Independence about the Indian Rebellion of 1857. In 1910, Savarkar was arrested and ordered to be extradited to India for his connections with the revolutionary freedom group India House. He was sentenced to a total 50 years imprisonment at the Cellular Jail but later released on the promise of renouncing violence.	

== See also ==
- Category:Indian revolutionaries
