= Swami Satyananda (disambiguation) =

Swami Satyananda may refer to:

- Swami Satyananda Giri (1896-1971), Indian monk
- Swami Satyananda Saraswati (1923-2009), Indian yoga teacher and guru

== See also ==
- Swami Satyananda Puri (disambiguation)
