= Bhavabhushan Mitra =

Indian revolutionary and an influential social worker

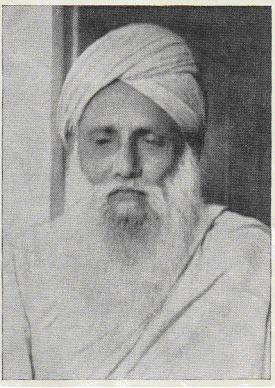
- Bhavabhushan Mitra
- Born: 1881; Balarampur, British India
- Died: 27 January 1970 (aged 88–89); Calcutta, India
- Other name: Swami Satyananda Puri
- Organization(s): Jugantar, Indian National Congress, Indian Independence League
- Movement: Indian Independence movement, Ghadar Conspiracy, Indian Independence League, Quit India

Bhavabhushan Mitra, or Bhaba Bhusan Mitter, alias Swami Satyananda Puri (1881– 27 January 1970), was a Bengali Indian freedom fighter and an influential social worker.

He represented the link between two radical trends: the highly centralised spirit of showdown personified by Barindra Kumar Ghose; and the decentralised loose federation of regional units advancing in a progressive revolution, as practised by the Jugantar movement under Bagha Jatin.

== Education ==
Born in the village of Balarampur in Jhenaidah District, now in Bangladesh, Bhavabhushan was son of Shyamacharan Mitra. As a student at Jhenaidah Government High School, Bhavabhushan excelled in sports. During a rough football match in about 1900 he crashed into an adversary, who was Bagha Jatin. Bhavabhushan later wrote: "In those days, colliding with the opponents and fracturing each other's legs were not considered as foul play."

Jatin and Bhavabhushan became close friends. Bhavabhushan discovered Swami Vivekananda's teachings, which had inspired the physical fitness programme in which Jatin was assisted by his boyhood friend, Kunjalal Saha of Kushtia. Soon, Jatin's club came to include other future celebrities like Baladev Ray (Kushtia), Phani Ray (Kushtia), Deviprasad Ray alias Khuro (Kushtia), Sisirkumar Ghosh (Sagardari, Jessore), Jyotish Majumdar alias Chandi (Jessore), Amaresh Kanjilal (Jessore), Suresh Majumdar alias Paran (Krishnagar), Atulkrishna Ghosh (Jadu-Bayra) and his cousin Nalinikanta Kar (Etmampur), Kshitish Sanyal (Pabna), Satish Sarkar (Natore), Jnan Mitra (Kolkata), Charu Ghose (Chetla), Nanigopal Sengupta (Howrah).

Jatin introduced Bhavabhushan to Surendranath Tagore, a nephew of Rabindranath Tagore. While looking after their estates at Silaidaha, the Tagores often consulted their solicitor Basantakumar Chatterjee, Jatin's maternal uncle and father of Phanibhushan and Nirmalkumar. And, like Rabindranath and Basantakumar, Suren not only held classes for the members of Jatin's club, but also practised riding, rowing and self-defence with them. Fond of Jatin and his friends, Suren taught them to think not only in terms of India's freedom but, especially, of Asian unity.

In 1900, invited by Suren at his Kolkata residence, Jatin and Bhavabhushan attended a meeting where Kakuzo Okakura, the Japanese dreamer of the movement "Asia is One," was presented to dignitaries like Sister Nivedita, Barrister Pramathanath Mitra, Shashibhushan Raychaudhury and the members of the Tagore family (Sarala Devi Chaudhurani, Rabindranath, Abanindranath Tagore). Like other patriots, too, Bhavabhushan was to be impressed by the Japanese victory over Russia in 1905, and admired Japan as an Asiatic power. Even in 1937, as a tribute to the Japanese admiral, he christened one of Jatin's grandsons as Togo. At Kolkata, Bhavabhushan noticed young Jatin's popularity among the seasoned personalities. Especially he found Mitter encouraging Jatin in his mission of preparing youths for an extremist uprising against the colonial rulers. As soon as the Kolkata Anushilan Samiti was inaugurated in 1902, with the help of Bhavabhushan and other associates, Jatin opened its branches in Kushtia and neighbouring towns. As Jatin's messengers, on several occasions Bhavabhushan and Chandi Majumdar used to meet Sarala Devi, Nivedita, P. Mitter, Bipin Chandra Pal, Krishnakumar Mitra.

From the beginning of Bagha Jatin's collaboration with Sri Aurobindo, in 1903, some of Jatin's recruits went to assist the former's brother Barin Ghose until Jatin and Barin decided to manufacture bombs jointly in Deoghar and Barin alone in Kolkata. The Police Who's Who mentions as one of Jatin's addresses Carstaris Town, Deoghar, Sonthal Parganas where, momentarily, lived his family. In Nadia, Kolkata and Deoghar, Bhavabhushan grew as much familiar with Jartin's relatives as with those of Barin's.

== Sedition ==
In 1904–1905, Barin and his maternal uncle Manindra Basu had been members of the "Golden League" club which furthered "the boycott and Swadeshi movement". The promoters were an Inspector of Schools named Baldeo Ram Jha and several local teachers, pleaders and other law-court officials. Among Barin's other friends were Sarada Charan Datta alias Bandar Babu and Shivakali Shome. After the death of his illustrious grandfather, Rajnarain Basu, Barin opened a club for self-defence where recruits from Kolkata, Kushtia and Dhaka came and it was regularly attended by Satyen Chaudhuri, Jyoti Prasad Chaudhuri, Naren Chakravarti and the brothers Sailendra and Sushil Sen.

One of the strangers who visited the Sil's Lodge "was dressed like a sadhu and it was given locally that he was ill (...) This man was taken periodically in a palki to Digripahar, a hill nearby, for open air treatment; under this cloak the party carried out their experiments with explosives in the jungles. Previous to the search at Sil's Lodge one Bhaba Bhusan Mitra used to frequent Mani Basu's akhara. He was known as the wanderer on account of his roving habits." Nolinikanta Gupta, member of the expedition, has narrated the episode how, in January 1908, Prafulla Chakravarti, son of Ishan Chakravarti, the Rangpur leader, lost his life while trying a picric acid bomb. In the same month, Barin and a party of seven including Bhavabhushan and Bijoykumar Nag of Khulna committed a hold-up in Rampore Boalia, according to Indra Nandi's statement. He mentioned, further: "There was a man called Jyotish [Majumdar, alias Chandi] in the garden who had been deputed by Bhaba Bhusan Mitra; he had in his possession a dynamite bomb which he took to throw at a padre somewhere in Jessore."

Correspondence found at 134 Harrison Road, showed Prakash Chandra Basu (Barindra Kumar Ghose) renting the Sil's Lodge at Rohini, via Baidyanath, Deoghar from its owner Devendranath Sil, in 1907. Also the Police seized in Deoghar and at the Muraripukur garden "sketches of relative positions of Baidyanath, Madhupur and Deoghar, one with a *mark near Deoghar, and in the corner white and very small pucca house." Searched on 28 May 1908, Sil's Lodge disclosed, among other materials, the presence of: (a) "9 small pieces of metal similar to a quantity found at the 'garden' and ready for melting." (b) "A label of the London chemists, Hewlett & Sons, similar to others found in Calcutta." This led Sealy to the conclusion: "Sil's Lodge was therefore clearly connected with the conspiracy (...) where members were sent for instruction and where explosives were made."

Among visitors to this centre were Sri Aurobindo alias Bara Karta, Subodh Chandra Mullick, V.B. Lele, Upen Banerjee, Ullaskar Dutta, Prafulla Chaki (the brave companion of Khudiram Bose in the Muzaffarpur expedition), three of Sri Aurobindo's cousins from Sagardari in Jessore (Birendra Nath, Sishir Kumar and Hemendra Prasad Ghose), Krishna Jiban Sanyal, Narendra Nath Bakshi, Sudhir Bagchi alias Sarkar (recruited by Sishir Kumar who learnt self-defence from Jatin Mukherjee alias Bagha Jatin). Sealy mentions also among Barin's friends two brothers, Narendra (supra) and Phanindra Chakravarti, grandsons of Dwarkanath Vidyabhusan of Changripota, both of them educated at Deoghar also. In 1915, Phanindra will accompany Naren Bhattacharya alias M. N. Roy as Jatindranath Mukherjee's emissaries to the Far East. As a link between Jatin and Barin, Bhavabhushan shuttled between Kushtia, Deoghar and Kolkata.

== The Kushtia murder ==
In 1908, the Reverend J. Harvey Higginbotham of Kushtia, by running an industrial exhibition with British materials, dissatisfied the local Swadeshi people. He was also suspected of being a Government spy. Apparently interested in the Bible, Baladeb Ray and some other young men visited the Missionary. On 4 March 1908, the Missionary was killed late in the evening. Baladeb, Ganesh Das and two others were arrested. The case was tried by Ashutosh Biswas, Public Prosecutor. The jury acquitted the accused. Whereas this outrage is believed to have been committed by Barin's party, a confidential deponent informed Denham that this was the work of the Kushtia Society, of which "Jatindra Nath Mukharji was the leading spirit."

Later, on 25 June 1908, the approver Naren Gossain told the Magistrate of Alipore that Barin and Upen Banerjee had informed him of this murder and he had learnt that "Bhavabhushan [Mitra] of Jessore or Khulna, and Kshitish [Sanyal], both residing at Kushtia, were concerned in it". Bhaba Bhusan Mitra "was very much mixed up with the Deoghar conspirators." While searching Sri Aurobindo's house, in May 1908, the Police discovered there a bicycle from Kushtia, belonging probably to Bhavabhushan.

In April 1908, Bhavabhushan accompanied Bagha Jatin and his family to Darjeeling. Jatin had founded there active branches of the Kolkata Anushilan Samiti. Bhavabhushan has left a first-hand account of the way, at the Siliguri railway station, Jatin taught a substantial lesson to four conceited British Army officers: the legal proceedings drawn up against Jatin had turned into such a sensation in the written press that the officers withdrew their complaint.

Sealy came to be informed that in April 1908 Barin had sent some machinery from Sil's Lodge to his mother's bungalow: believed to be deranged, she, Swarnalata Devi, "used to rush out with a sword whenever anyone approached the Raidih house." Once Sri Aurobindo commented: "I am the insane son of an insane mother." While her servants were busy burying the machinery under the direction of a "Bengali gentleman" (identified as Bhavabhushan), Swarnalata kept watch at the door. Moreover, one can easily evaluate his importance in the party hierarchy when Sealy records: "Mani Basu, Bhaba Bhusan, Subodh Mullick and two other Bengalis were seen in secret conversation in the compound of a ruined house." Subodh "took a prominent part in the early revolutionary propaganda and was a staunch friend of Arabinda Ghosh", and was to be one of the 1908 deportees. His wife was a friend of Hemangini Devi.

== Evade prosecution ==
Early in May 1908, escaping the massive arrests in Bengal, Bhavabhushan fled to Mumbai under the name of Advaitananda Brahmachari; when a money order sent by one Swami Krishnananda from 275 Upper Chitpur Road of Kolkata (one of Jatin's addresses, C/o his uncle, Dr Hemantakumar Chatterjee) reached him, the Police detained it for investigation. Exhibit LXXXVI found at the "garden" contained "a very important book, full of notes regarding the members of the society, references to religious, moral and political training, study of revolutionary histories of other countries, art of war etc". Therein Bhaba Bhushan was named. Further, "Ex. CLVI is a letter found at the 'garden' to 'My Dear B.' and the cover is addressed to B.B. Mitra, 30/2 Harrison Road."

Sealy held that Bhababhusan was traced at Deoghar, and he was proved to have been at the Kolkata 'garden' as an active member. He secured 78 Russa Road for the use of the conspirators and was an associate of Barin, Ullaskar Dutta, Sushil Ghosh, Sailendra Nath Das and others. Meanwhile, Tilak published two papers ("The Country's Misfortune" and "These Remedies Are Not Lasting") in his Kesari, supporting the extremist challenge in Bengal since the Muzaffarpore incident; he advised the Government to appreciate the changed psychology of the people. With his new identity as Swami Bhumananda, on 22 July 1908, Bhavabhushan joined a group of revolutionaries who, disguised as fierce monks, created a panic by attacking the armed police to protest against Tilak's trial: the Leader was accused of fomenting hatred and contempt, exciting disloyalty to HM's Government. In the bomb factory in Kolkata, the Police also found some letters from the Chandmari post office of Darjeeling by the above-mentioned Krishnananda, addressed to one Birkumar Mukherjee. The Judge Birley during the Alipore Case did identify them to be, respectively, Bagha Jatin and Bhavabhushan.

"Following the arrest of the Manicktola conspirators and the legal onslaught on the Calcutta Anushilan Samiti (1908–1909), (...) [Jatin Mukherjee's] appearance on the scene just at this juncture was a god-send to the revolutionary workers. Very soon he plunged himself deeply into politics, secretly undertaking missionary tours through the districts of Howrah, Nadia, Khulna, Jessore, Rajshahi and 24 Parganas and setting up secret societies in each district under the command of a local leader."

Two days after the searches in Kolkata, on 4 May 1908, Bhavabhushan arrived suddenly at Deoghar dressed in ochre and stayed about 15 days with Sarada Charan, "an attorney of the Calcutta High Court, a most suspicious gentleman who was undoubtedly in league with the revolutionaries." Later Bhababhushan gave out that the revolutionary Shyamji Krishna Varma had asked him to join the group in Paris. He was holding a valid passport when the police arrested him in Mumbai. Bhababhushan had been in jail during the trial of the main case, 1908–1909, and was convicted in a supplementary case connected with the Howrah case in June 1910.

== New plans ==
Released from jail on 2 December 1914, on 10 January 1915, Bhababhushan turned up at Deoghar and went straight to Mani Basu. Also he "had immediately taken up with old confederates and members of the Alipore gang, notably Bijoy Chakravarti, Pramatha Bhattacharji, Amaresh Kanjilal in Jessore, from which place he suddenly disappeared on 8 January. While there he also, as he admitted later, met the notorious Jatindra Nath Mukherji. In Deoghar he gave out his intention of leading an ascetic's life, but it was soon obvious that he was there for no good purpose, and he was very carefully watched."

From 2 March 1916, according to Sealy's Report, Bhababhushan assumed the name of Satyananda Puri, left Sarada Datta and made a show of renouncing the world. He inserted an advertisement in the Amrita Bazar Patrika regarding a nursing home he intended setting up. Later on he wanted to build himself an ashram. The police took their opportunity and through secret agents got him installed in a house, where they watched him and, apparently, gained his confidence. The place was known as the Girish Ashram. Bhababhushan gave out that money was needed by the revolutionaries to defray the expenses of active workers, to maintain the families of those killed or imprisoned and to collect arms and ammunition for the sending of emissaries to the Straits and the Far East where there were German Consuls.

For the recruiting and training of boys in political work and that this last-named branch was the part that was being organised in Deoghar, one Santi Bakshi, a teacher in the H.E. School being the chief local recruiter. The three brothers, Jogi, Hara and Jyoti Prasad Chaudhuri from Ranaghat, associates of Santi Bakshi and Barin, were also constantly in Bhababhushan's company, as well as Alokenath Chakravarti, a cousin of Phanindra Chakravarti. Among Bhababhushan's other immediate associates were two brothers, Gangadhar and Shashadhar Chatterji; boasting that "he would turn out a second Jatin Mukherjee", Bhababhushan had sent Gangadhar to Benares.

Another youth found at the ashram was Kiran Chandra Chatterji, an acquaintance of Hemangini Devi and the monk Thakurdas Babaji: according to Sealy, "the Sadhu was the religious preceptor of these dangerous persons" such as Dr Jnanendra Nath Mitra of Patna, Kedarnath Banerjee, a pleader from Kolkata, practising in Bankipore and the latter's wife, Hemangini who, believed Sealy, was "used by Dr Mitra in furtherance of his plans in much the same way as the notorious [sic!] Sarala Devi in Bengal." Satish Chandra Sarkar of Natore, an associate of Jatindranath Mukherjee and Phani Mitra of Kolkata (the future printer of the seditious Jugantar) were on the staff of the Motherland edited by Dr Mitra.

During 1906–1907, they had received the visit of Upendranath Banerjee, Bibhutibhushan Sarkar, Ullaskar Datta and Prafulla Chaki, four important associates of Barin, and they had been to see Thakurdas at Dhaniapahari. Since Kedarnath's death in 1914, Hemangini lived in Deoghar.

Sealy considered the sequel to Bhababhushan's stay in Deoghar to be interesting: first of all, it afforded light on the workings of the revolutionaries; it showed, moreover, how the various branches of the conspiracy were interconnected and the extraordinary manner in which all known workers and sympathisers were marked down and made use of when opportunity offered. The organisations "are so closely connected and the ramifications so wide, it is often impossible to grasp the issues; the deeper one goes into their plotting the more interesting do the connections become." Ananta Haldar, an active member of the party, had lived in Deoghar in 1911–1912. In June 1916, he visited Deoghar and, directed by Sarada Datta, went to Satyananda's ashram. Immediately after the man left, when the police visited Bhababhushan, they found the doors bolted from inside and noticed smell of burning paper.

After Ananta's arrest, a search made of the latter's belongings led to important discoveries: whereabouts of the absconding associates of Jatindranath Mukherjee such as Atulkrishna Ghose and Nolinikanta Kar, "two dangerous and important absconders", Ashutosh Ray and Anukul Mukherjee of Rodda's Theft case, Gopendra Ray, Ashutosh Lahiri; notes on Abinash Chandra Chakravarti, the ex-munsiff of Pabna and Monghyr, Jyotish Pal of the Balasore case, "32 Haritakibagan, 10 Abhoy Haldar's Lane, the headquarters of the Sibpur gang... Enquiries in Bengal showed that the youth was known as a member of the gang and was in close touch with Makhan Ghose, Atul Ghose, Nolini Kanta Kar, Debendra Chaudhuri of the Jajpur dakaiti case and Jatin Mukherjee, and that he had been lost sight of."

Ananta and his brother Jatin Haldar had been in close touch with Jatindranath Mukherjee. After Ananta's visit, Bhababhushan warned Mani Basu through Santi Bakshi that there would be a search. Ananta admitted his connection with Gopen Ray, Nolini Kar, Atul Ghose and others, and had been sent by Atul to Bhababhushan, "who was one of the trusted men of the party." An influential leader of youths in Deoghar, Santi Bakshi had known Sri Aurobindo's family very well, especially the latter's sister Sarojini Ghose, maternal uncle Mani Basu, uncle Krishnakumar Mitra, his daughter Kumudini Mitra and her fiancé Sachindraprasad Basu, before joining Bhababhushan and his party, since 1908. Santi had been to the Damodar Flood relief in 1913. Daily he visited Subodh Mullick, who was Sri Aurobindo's intimate friend.

In May 1916, Santi with his nephew Jyotiprasad Chaudhuri went for an "alleged" holiday trip and stayed finally for three weeks at Simla. Two letters from Nikhileswar Ray Mullick, a key figure of the Jugantar, dated Simla 3 and 14 June, addressed to Jitendranath Basu, nephew of Atul Ghose, "one of the most dangerous members of the gang", according to Sealy, were found during a house search at 11 Mahendra Gossain Lane (a meeting place of Atul's men), in which references to the need of concealment were made and to Santi's presence there. Santi Bakshi was arrested.

Sealy mentioned: "Looking at them in all their complicated details, these connections seem to point without doubt to a well organised attempt at Deoghar to further the objects of the conspiracy (...) Bhava Bhusan must undoubtedly have been sent to Deoghar with some definite orders by one of the leaders..." Persuaded that Patna and Deoghar were connected with the Alipore case and subsequently with the gun-running conspiracy, Sealy mentioned: "Jatin Mukherjee visited the place also and left his family there on one occasion." Deoghar was a convenient refuge for suspects tracked down at Bhagalpur, Bankipur, Muzaffarpur, Purnea and elsewhere.

In August 1916, Bhavabhushan was interned under the Defence of India Act. He was released on personal recognisance in January 1920.

== Later years ==
Nobody knows what the exact terms of "personal recognisance" were. But Bhavabhushan seems to have avoided all overtly active part in the subsequent episodes of freedom fight, though generations of revolutionaries in Bihar and Bengal admit having consulted him and followed his advice in critical situations. In Bihar, behind the scene, he was as much involved in the Non Cooperation Movement in 1922, as in the mass agitation organised by Sahajananda Sarasvati's Kishan Sabha ("Peasants' Guild') in the districts like Champaran, Saran, Monghyr, Madhubani to protest against the rampant unemployment, where "social banditry" prevailed, followed by a refusal to pay taxes.

Accused by the Indian National Congress of forsaking the precepts of non-violence, Sahajananda was expelled and, out of sympathy for him, Jayprakash Narayan resigned from the Congress Working Committee. During the Quit India Movement in 1942, Bhavabhushan's men disrupted under the leadership of Jayprakash Narain and Ramanand Mishra all means of communication. Escaping from the prison of Hazaribagh, Jayprakash could launch a guerrilla, supported by the revolutionaries of the area, before shifting his headquarters to Nepal. Some of Bhavabhushan's followers like Dr Lambodar Mukherjee of Motihari were useful also to Hari Vishnu Kamath during the latter's trial in Bihar, in 1942. Kamath shared with Bhavabhushan his admiration for Sri Aurobindo.

In these regions, Bhavabhushan was seen as someone who shunned the limelight and who was faithful to his past commitment at the secret society. He guided young men and introduced them to acquaintances like Subhas Chandra Bose, Bidhan Roy, Abanindranath Tagore or Nandalal Bose, to arrange suitable schooling. He also found matches for girls from needy families. His Ashrams at Deoghar and elsewhere remained a reference for their charitable activities, especially regarding women's place in society. He supported the Mother's effort for women's emancipation at Sri Aurobindo Ashram in Pondicherry.

In the late 1940s, Sri Aurobindo was informed that a great yogi had come down from the Himalayas to visit his Ashram. When the visitors filed past him, Sri Aurobindo smiled at the sadhu in a significant way. Later he exclaimed: "That is our Bhavabhushan. He is even younger than Barin!" Acquainted with traditional modes of Nature cure and Ayurvedic remedies, he applied them with success. Fond of wandering, Bhababhushan had visited shrines all over North and North-West India, under very hard conditions. After 1947, when Bhupendra Kumar Datta was appointed by the Jugantar workers to write an authentic biography of Bagha Jatin or Jatindranath Mukherjee, Bhababhushan sent him a series of written notes and, in 1963, granted interviews to Prithwindra Mukherjee (Datta's assistant), adding supplementary facts on the agniyuga ("Fiery Epoch") that preceded and prepared the Gandhian freedom movement.

Feats of paranoia were aggravated by the frustration caused by the ominous partition of India in 1947. Younger than Bagha Jatin, towards the end of life, Bhavabhushan lived the illusion of having brought up Jatin and guided him across critical choices. A batch of devotees, thrilled by fascinating revelations made by the Swami, encouraged him in his pathology. Having detected this tendency in several other former revolutionaries like Jadugopal Mukherjee and Satish Sarkar, Bhupendra Kumar Datta, Bagha Jatin's loyal follower, warned them individually, in the name of History, adding supplementary facts on the agniyuga ("Fiery Epoch") that preceded and prepared the Gandhian freedom movement.

On 27 January 1970, Bhababhushan died in Kolkata.

== Note ==
Both Ker and Sealy mention that Bhavabhushan was born "about 1888," whereas he himself recalled it to be the Bengali year 1288, which corresponds to 1881.
