= Narendra Mohan Sen =

Indian revolutionary

Narendra Mohan Sen (1887–1963) was an Indian freedom fighter and revolutionary involved with Anushilan Samiti.

== Short biography ==
Narendra joined the revolutionary outfit that was known as Anushilan Samiti. He played a major role in unifying Jugantar, led by Jadugopal Mukherjee and Anushilan Samiti in the 1920s, after both parties suffered major setbacks because most of their senior leaders were arrested.
