= Lokhande =

Clan found in Indian state Maharashtra

Lakhande लोखंडे
- Clan of Marathi speakings
- Ethnicity: Koli people; Maratha; Brahmin; Mang; Mahars; Ramoshi
- Location: Maharashtra; Goa; Dadra and Nagar Haveli and Daman and Diu
- Demonym: Marathi people
- Language: Kachi Koli; Marathi; Hindi; English
- Religion: Hinduism
- Surnames: Deshmukh; Patil; Nayak

The Lokhande (Hindi: लोखंडे) is a clan (Gotra) found amongst the Koli, Maratha, Mang, Mahar, Ramoshi, Brahmin, mainly in the state of Maharashtra in India but it also appears in Indian states bordering Maharashtra. Lokhande means the person who deals with iron or ironmonger.

== Notable ==
Notable people with the surname include:

- Ankita Lokhande, Indian actress
- Ashok Lokhande, Indian film, television and theatre actor
- Narayan Meghaji Lokhande, (1848–1897) father of trade union movement in India
- Sadashiv Lokhande, Indian politician

== See also ==
- Marathi people
