= Jugantar =

Secret revolutionary group operating in Bengal for Indian independence

Jugantar or Yugantar (Bengali: যুগান্তর Jugantor; lit. New Era or Transition of an Epoch) was one of the two main secret revolutionary trends operating in Bengal for Indian independence. This association, like Anushilan Samiti, started in the guise of a suburban health and fitness club while secretly nurturing revolutionaries. Several Jugantar members were arrested, hanged, or deported for life to the Cellular Jail in Andaman and many of them joined the Communist Consolidation in the Cellular Jail.

== The beginning ==
The Jugantar party was established in April 1906 by leaders like Aurobindo Ghosh, his brother Barin Ghosh, Hemchandra Kanungo, and Upen Banerjee. Along with 21 revolutionaries, they started to collect arms, explosives and manufactured bombs. The headquarters of Jugantar were located at 27 Kanai Dhar Lane then 41 Champatola 1st Lane in Kolkata.

== Activities ==
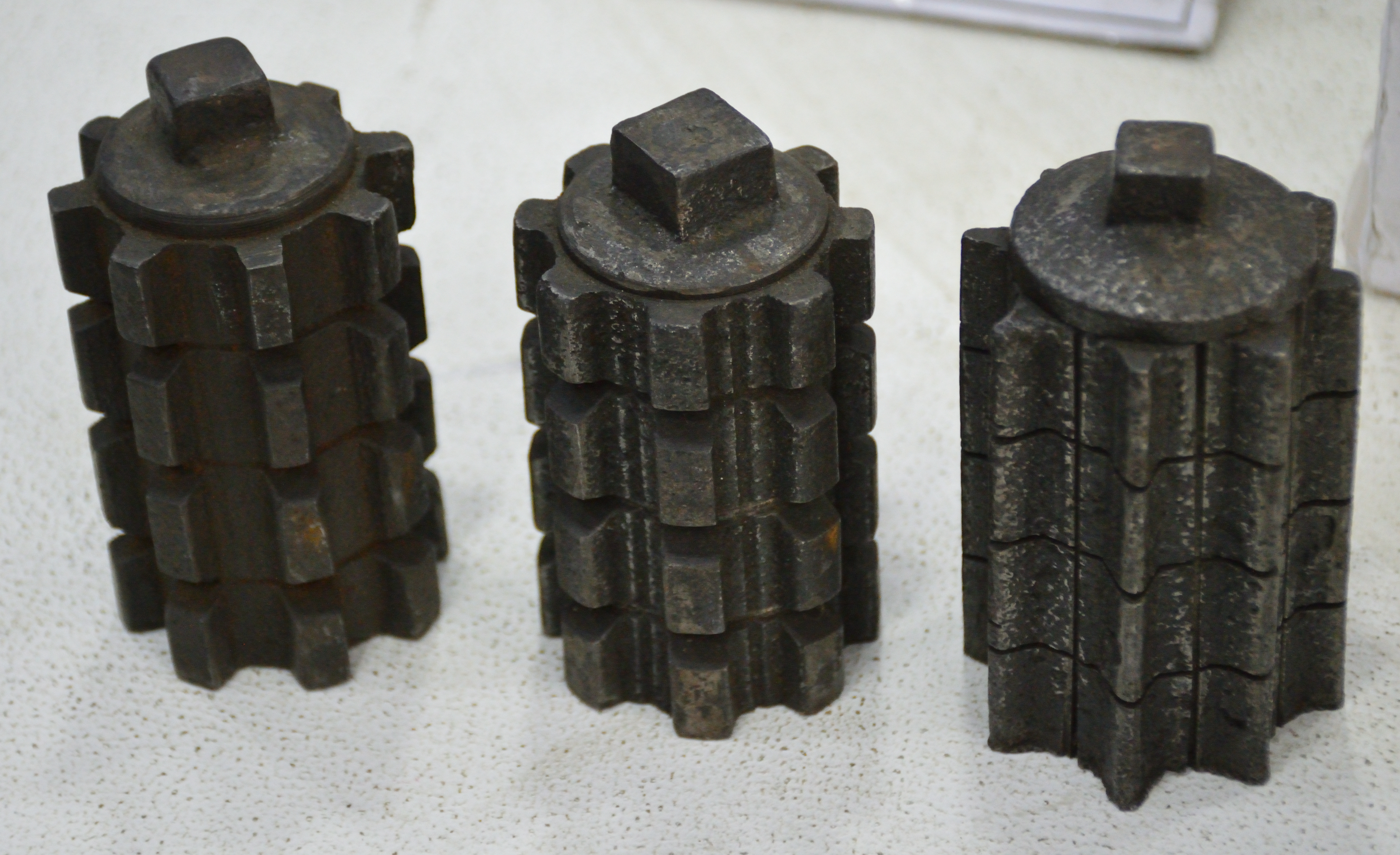
The Jugantar party possessed cast iron bombshells those manufactured in 1930 by themselves.

Some senior members of the group were sent abroad. One of the first batches included Surendra Mohan Bose, Tarak Nath Das and Guran Ditt Kumar, who, since 1907, were extremely active among the Hindu and Sikh immigrants on the Western coast of North America. These units were to compose the future Ghadar Party. In Paris Hemchandra Kanungo alias Hem Das, along with Pandurang M. Bapat, obtained training in explosives from the Russian anarchist Nicholas Safranski. After returning to Kolkata, Hemchandra Kanungo joined the combined school of 'self-culture' (anushilan) and opened a bomb factory at a garden house in Maniktala, a suburb of Calcutta. However, the attempted murder of Kingsford, the-then district Judge of Muzaffarpur by Khudiram Bose and Prafulla Chaki (30 April 1908) initiated a police investigation that led to the arrest of many of the revolutionaries. The prisoners were tried in the famous Alipore bomb conspiracy case in which several activists were deported for life to the Cellular Jail in Andaman.

In 1908, as a next step, Jugantar chose to censure persons connected with the arrest and trial of revolutionaries involved in the Alipore Bomb Case. On 10 February 1909, Ashutosh Biswas, who conducted the prosecution of Kanai and Satyen for the murder of Naren Gosain (a revolutionary turned approver), was shot dead by Charu Basu in the Calcutta High Court premises. Samsul Alam, Deputy Superintendent of Police, who conducted the Alipore Case was shot and killed by Biren Dutta Gupta on the stairs of Calcutta High Court building on 24 January 1910. Charu Basu and Biren Dutta Gupta were later hanged.

Several including Jatindra Nath Mukherjee were arrested in connection with the murder of Police inspector Samsul Alam on 24 January 1910 in Calcutta and other charges. Thus started the Howrah-Sibpur Conspiracy case that tried the prisoners for treason, waging war against the Crown and tampering with the loyalty of Indian soldiers, such as those belonging to the Jat Regiment posted in Fort William, and soldiers in Upper Indian Cantonments.

== The German plot ==
Nixon's Report corroborates that Jugantar under Jatindra Nath Mukherjee counted a good deal on the ensuing World War to organise an armed uprising with the Indian soldiers in various regiments. During World War I the Jugantar Party arranged importation of German arms and ammunitions (notably the 32 bore German automatic pistols) via Virendranath Chattopadhyay alias Chatto and other revolutionaries residing in Germany. They had contacted Indian revolutionaries active in the United States, as well as Jugantar leaders in Kolkata. Jatindra Nath Mukherjee informed Rash Behari Bose to take charge of Upper India, aiming at an All-Indian Insurrection with the collaboration of native soldiers in different cantonments. History refers to it as the Hindu German Conspiracy. To raise fund, the Jugantar party organized a series of dacoities, organized robbery by armed gangs, which came to be known as Taxicab dacoities and Boat dacoities, in order to procure funds to prepare the ground for working out the Indo-German Conspiracy.

The first of the Taxicab dacoities took place at Garden Reach, Kolkata on 12 February 1915, by a group of armed revolutionaries under the leadership of Narendra Bhattacharya under the direct supervision of Jatindranath Mukherjee. Similar dacoities were organized on different occasions and in various parts of Calcutta. Dacoities were accompanied by political murders in which the victims were mostly zealous police officers investigating into the cases, or approvers who helped the police.

== Failure of the German plot ==
On receiving instructions from Berlin, Jatindra Nath Mukherjee selected Naren Bhattacharya (alias M. N. Roy) and Phani Chakravarti (alias Pyne) to meet the German legation at Batavia. The Berlin committee had decided that the German arms were to be delivered at two or three places like Hatia on Chittagong coast, Raimangal in the Sunderbans and Balasore in Orissa. The plan was to organize a guerrilla force to start an uprising in the country, backed by a mutiny among the Indian Armed Force. The whole plot leaked out locally owing to a native traitor and, internationally, through Czech revolutionaries in the United States. As soon as the information reached the British authorities, they alerted the police, particularly in the delta region of the Ganges, and sealed all the sea approaches on the eastern coast from Noakhali-Chittagong side to Orissa. Sramajibi Samabaya and Harry & Sons of Calcutta, the two business concerns run respectively by Amarendra Chatterjee and Harikumar Chakrabarti which were taking an active part in the Indo-German Conspiracy were searched. The police learned that Bagha Jatin was in Balasore awaiting a German arms delivery. Police went on to find out the hiding places of Bagha Jatin and associates and after a gun-fight, the revolutionaries were either killed or arrested. The German plot thus failed.

== Unification and failure ==
Following these major setbacks, and in the new circumstances of the colonial powers practising their divide and rule policy, there was an attempt to unify the revolutionary factions in Bengal. Anushilan Samiti and Jugantar were brought close by the joint leadership of Narendra Mohan Sen of Anushilan, and Jadugopal Mukherjee of Jugantar. However, this merger failed to revive the revolutionary activities up to the expected level.

== Notable members ==
- Abinash Chandra Bhattacharya (1882–1962)
- Basanta Kumar Biswas (1895–1915)
- Khudiram Bose (1889–1908)
- Satyendranath Bosu (1882–1908)
- Prafulla Chaki (1888–1908)
- Ambika Chakrabarty (1891–1962)
- Amarendra Chatterjee (1880–1957)
- Hemchandra Das Kanungo, alias Hem Das (1871–1951)
- Taraknath Das (1884–1958)
- Bhupendra Kumar Datta (1894–1979)
- Kanailal Dutta (1888–1908)
- Ullaskar Dutta
- Bipin Behari Ganguli (1887–1954)
- Santi Ghose (1916–1989)
- Surendra Mohan Ghose alias Madhu Ghosh (1893–1976)
- Aurobindo Ghosh (1872–1950)
- Barin Ghosh (1880–1959)
- Ganesh Ghosh (b. 1900 )
- Arun Chandra Guha (b. 1892)
- Bagha Jatin alias Jatindra Nath Mukherjee (1879–1915)
- Hare Krishna Konar (1915–1974)
- Bhavabhushan Mitra
- Santosh Kumar Mitra (1901–1931)
- Satyendra Chandra Mitra (1888–1942)
- Mohit Moitra
- Jadugopal Mukherjee (1866–1976)
- Subodh Chandra Mullick
- Surya Sen (1894–1934)
- M. N. Roy (1889–1954)
