= Swami Satyananda Puri =

Swami Satyanda Puri may refer to:

- Bhavabhushan Mitra (1881–1970), Bengali Indian revolutionary intricately involved with the Jugantar Party and the Indo-German Conspiracy
- Prafulla Kumar Sen (died 1942), Bengali Indian philosopher involved with the Thai-Bharat Cultural Lodge and later was key in founding the Indian Independence League in South-East Asia
