= Umaji Naik =

Indian revolutionary (1791–1832)

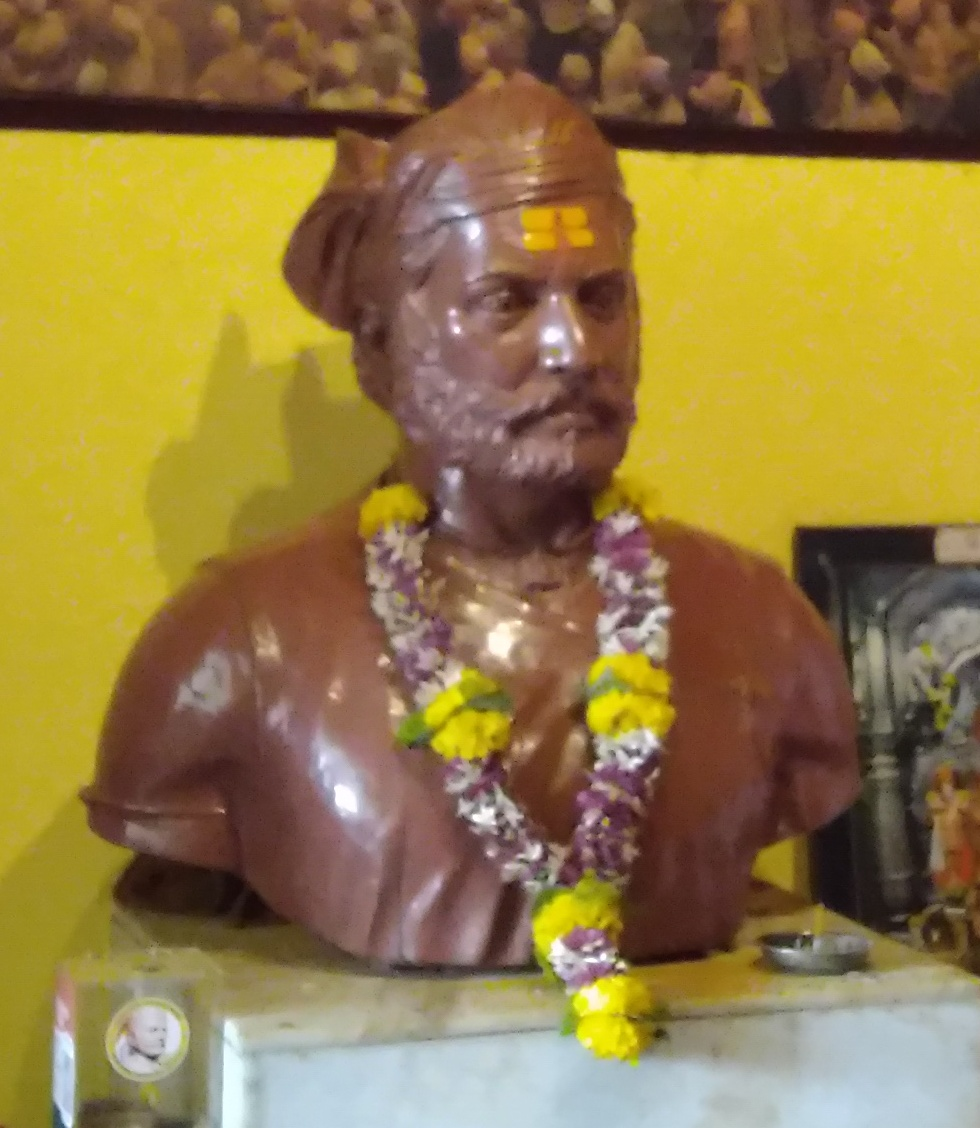
- Bust of Naik at his samadhi in Pune
- Born: 7 September 1791; Bhiwadi, Pune, Maratha Confederacy (modern day Maharashtra, India)
- Died: 3 February 1832 (aged 40); Pune, Bombay Presidency
- Cause of death: Hanging
- Known for: Indian independence movement

Umaji Naik (7 September 1791 – 3 February 1832) was an Indian revolutionary who challenged the British rule in India around 1826 to 1832. He fought against East India company and company rule.

Soon after the fall of Maratha Confederacy Naik raised a tiny army against the British. His anti-British manifesto asked the country-men to fight against the foreign rulers. To capture him, the British Government announced a bounty of 10,000 rupees. Betrayed by another Ramoshi named Nana Raghu Chavan British arrested him, inquired then hold him guilty and hanged till death on 3 Feb 1834 in Pune.

== Early life ==
Umaji Naik was born on 7 September 1791 in the Ramoshi tribe. Umaji's brother's name was Krishnaji Naik

He belonged to the Ramoshi community, which migrated from Telangana and settled down in Maharashtra during the Maratha period but was later branded as a tribe of thieves during the British rule.

== Fight against British rule ==
Before the East India company rule, Ramoshis use to work under Maratha rule. These Ramoshis used to work for surveillance of Maratha region and for security of Maratha forts in Maharashtra during the Maratha period. The Ramoshi(s) were entrusted with night patrolling and policing by the Marathas. Because of this work they had the right to take taxes from few specific villages. But after defeat of the Maratha Confederacy by the British, this right got violated because of which Ramoshis started a struggle against the Britishers.

Soon after the fall of the Maratha Confederacy, Naik raised a tiny army against Britishers. In 1826, Naik declared himself a king. In 1831 he spread his command, with a proclamation to kill British infantry and cavalry and to loot their property. Naik lived in mountains of Satara, Kurud, Mand devi Kalbai's mountain, Khopoli Khandala and Borghat during his struggle against British Raj. He issued his stamp in which he wrote "Umajiraje Naik, Mukkam Dongar" (lit. 'Hero Umaji, lives in Mountains').

Naik attacked Jejuri's police headquarters and killed policemen there. Ramoshi people used to punish those who were loyal to the Britishers and British Raj. Naik would loot money of the British government and Sahukars.

In 1828, the Britishers entered into a pact in which the Naik was given 120 Bigha land and promised to give government jobs to Ramoshi people. After this pact, Ramoshi stopped war against British for some time. But the peace did not last long and Naik again rose in revolt.

== Arrest ==
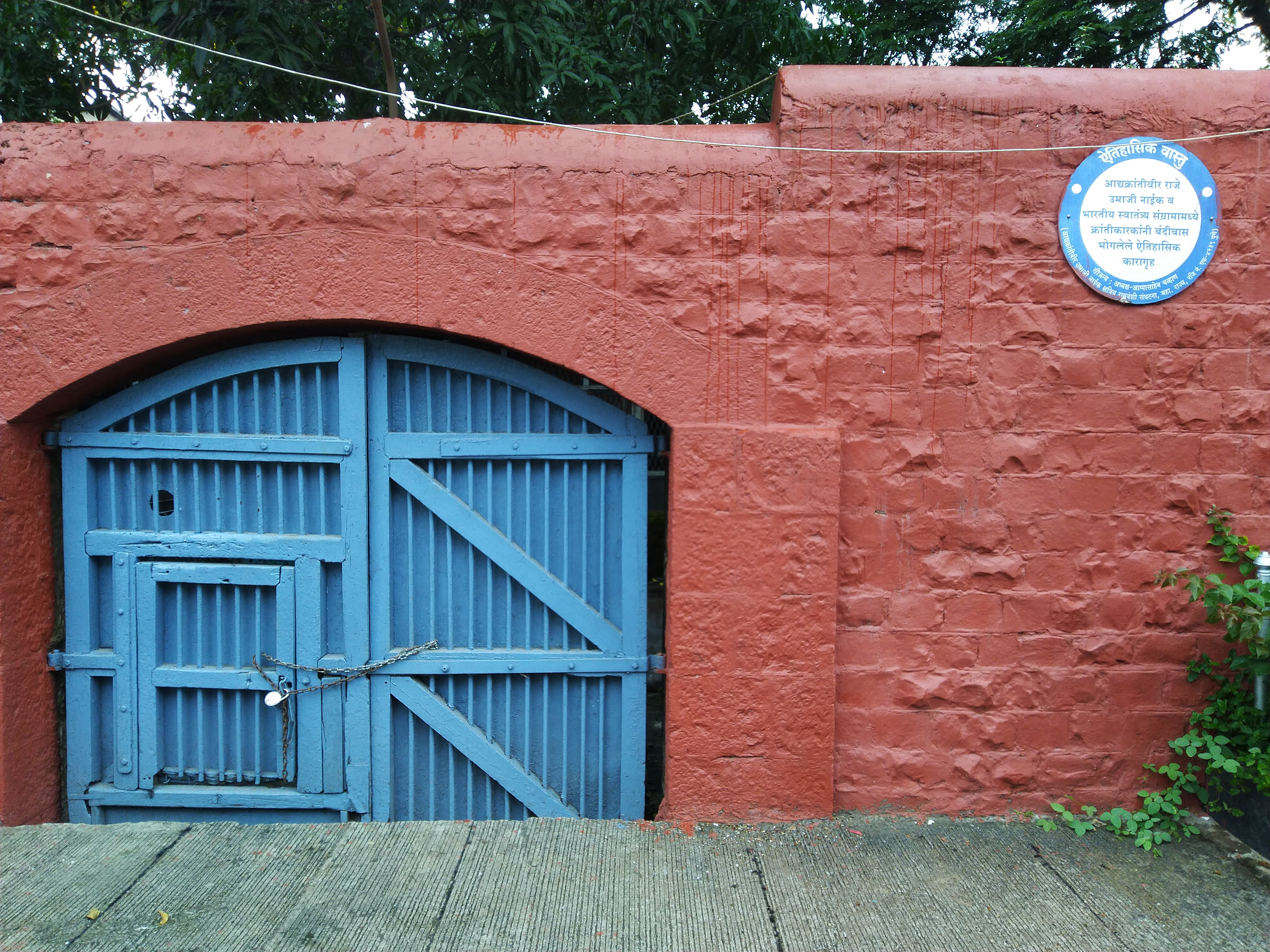
Jail where Naik was imprisoned in Pune after his arrest.

To capture Naik, British East India company appointed Officer Makcintosh. Under command of Makcintosh big British police officers like captain Wide, Livingston, Lukan planned and launched operation to arrest Naik. In spite of that he did not get captured "Makcintosh bribed Naik's sister Jijai by giving her ownership of four villages and arrested Naik. According to "Gazetteer of Bombay presidency: Satara", in 1831, a Ramoshi named Nana Raghu Chavan received £1000 (India rupee 10,000) bounty reward from government for arrest of Naik'. This is recorded by a dismissed agent of pant sachiv to district magistrate Mr. Rose on 10 June 1857. He was arrested and held in prison in Pune. In Pune, Umaji Naik was hanged in this Tehsil office on 3 February 1832, by the British Government.

Heritage structures at the memorial of Umaji Naik in Pune

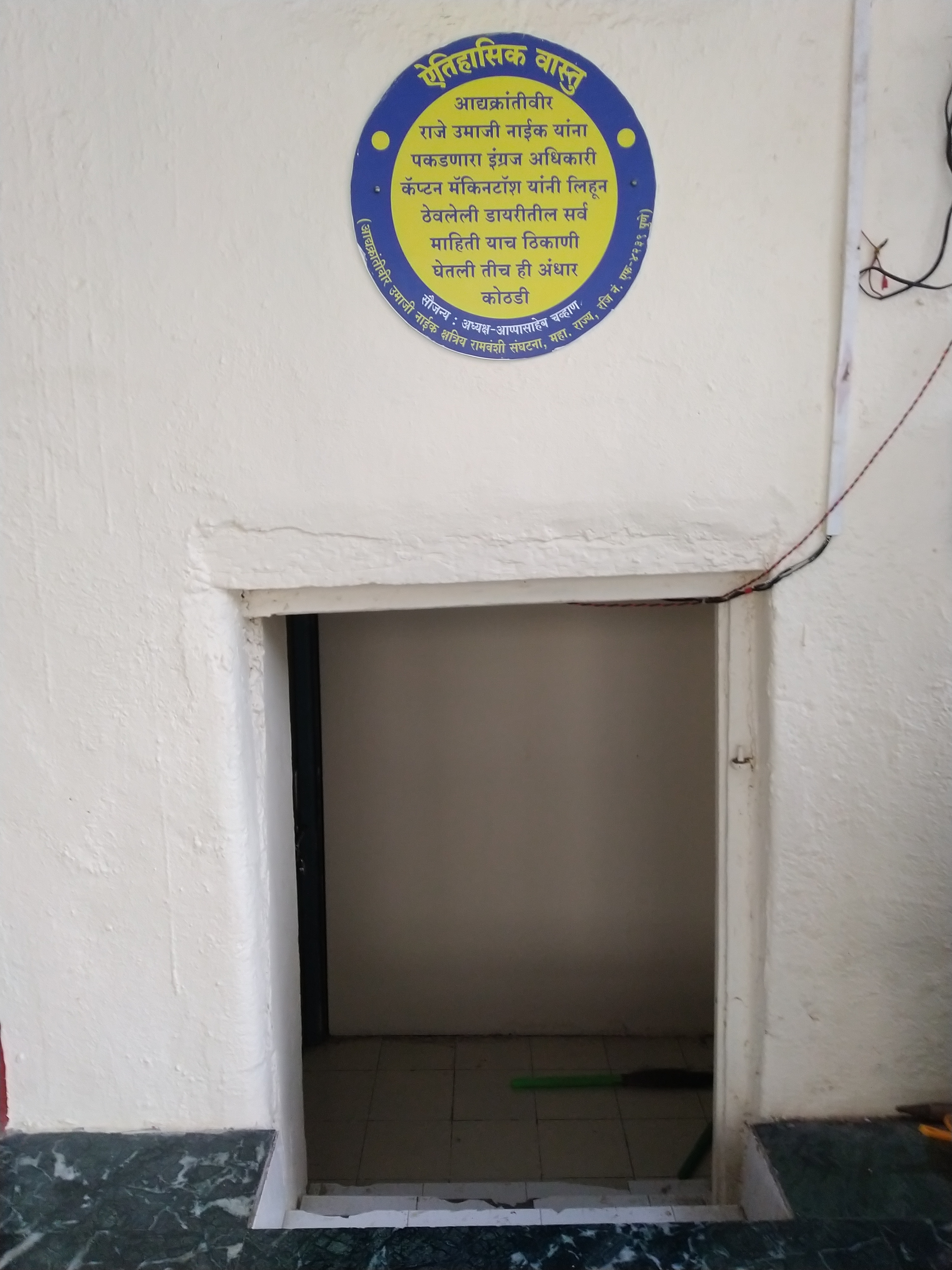
Dark room (Andhar Kothi) where Umaji Naik was interrogated by Captain Makcintosh in Pune.

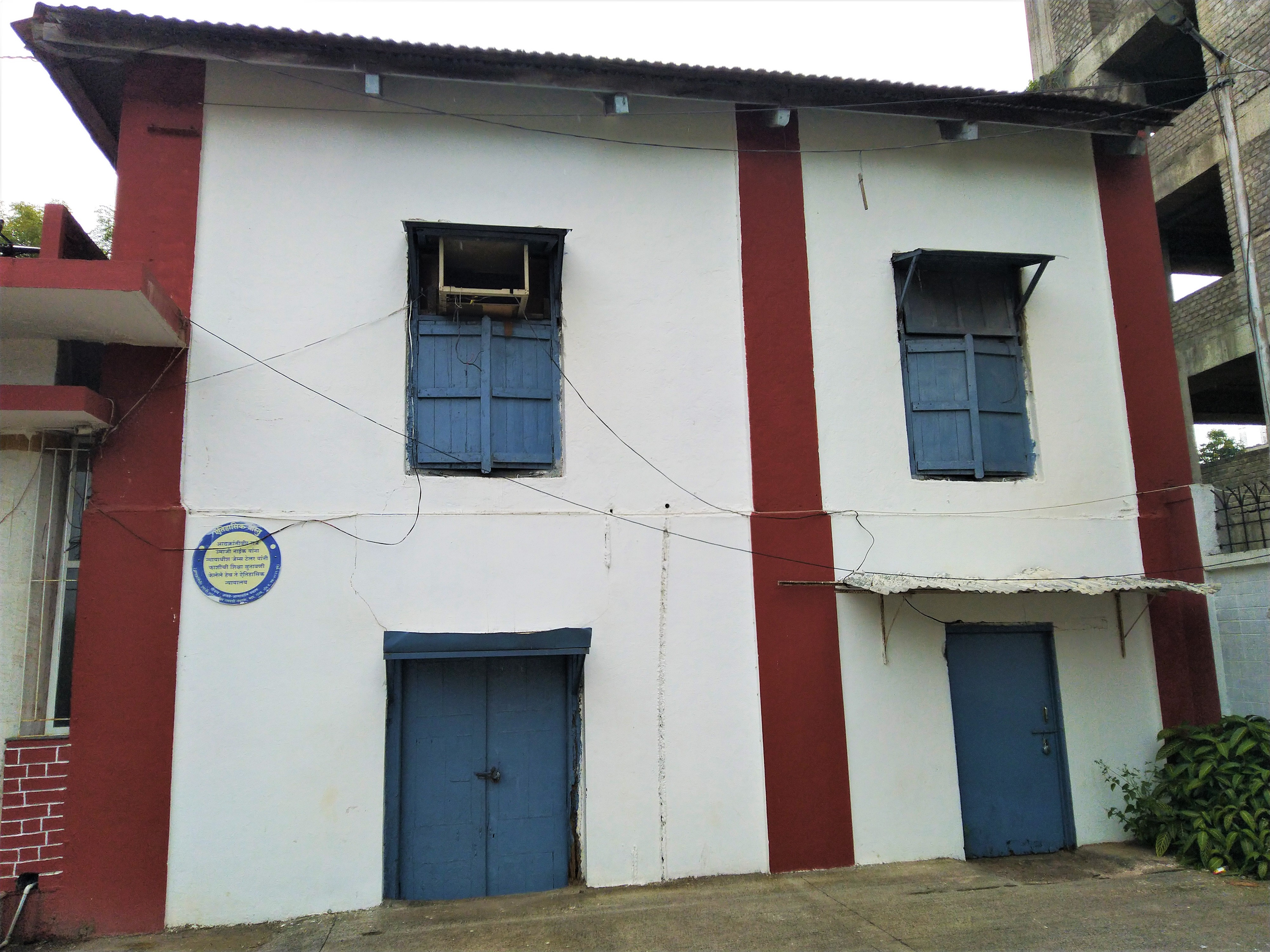
Court building where Umaji Naik was under trial. It was announced here that he would be hanged.

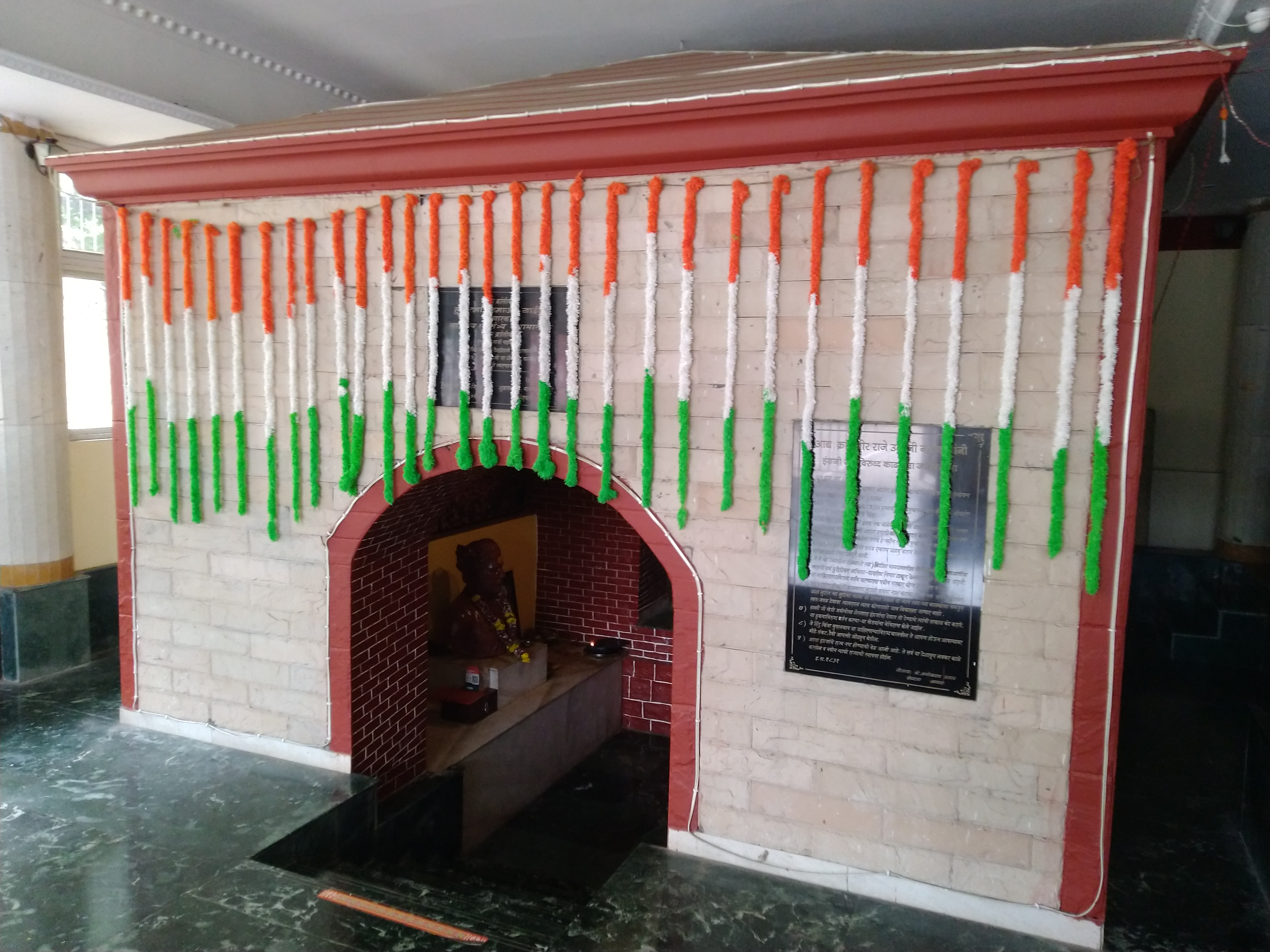
Place where Umaji Naik was hanged in Pune. This structure now houses his samadhi.

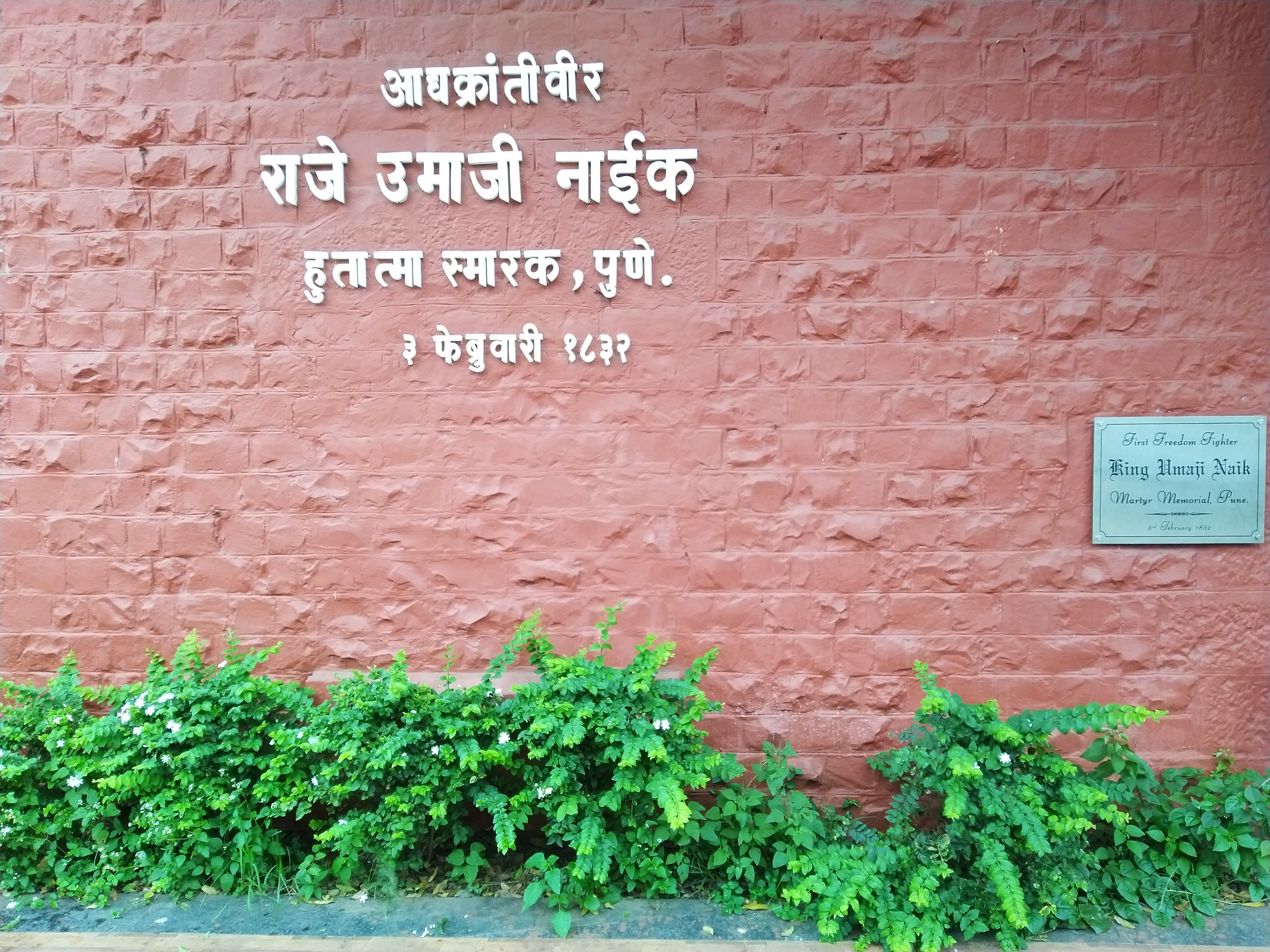
The memorial to Umaji Naik in Pune.

== Popular culture ==
A movie made in 1960 portrayed Naik's life. In 2012, Bollywood actor Nana Patekar was expected to headline a film based on Naik's life, but ultimately no movie was made.
