= Sushila Chain Trehan =

- Born: 1 July 1923; Pathankot
- Died: 28 September 2011 (aged 88)
- Known for: freedom struggle, social activism
- Parent: Mathuradas Trehan

Notes
- Founded Stree Sabha

Sushila Chain Trehan (1 July 1923 – 28 September 2011) was a freedom fighter and women activist. She worked towards educating and liberating the women of Punjab until her death.

== Early life ==
Trehan was born in Pathankot and was the youngest of four siblings. Her father Mathuradas Trehen, was a contractor and one of the founder members of Congress Party in his area and also a leading member of Arya Samaj. Trehan was also a leader of the East Punjab Istri Sabha.

Trehan lost her father under mysterious circumstances and the family lost their source of income and wealth.

Trehan married Chain Singh Chain who was a founder member of Kiry Party.

== Career as activist ==
Trehan joined the Arya Samaj as a teenager when while attending an opening meeting the attendees were surrounded by police and beaten up. Trehan at that age, decided to fight against injustice.

Trehan became a political activist and moved to the communist party headquarter in Lahore in 1941. That time she was working along Bibi Raghbir Kaur who was a Kirti-Ghadar Party member of Punjab State Legislative assembly. By this time, Trehan had left home and joined Shakuntala Azad to join the freedom fighters against the capitalist system Indian society was under.

Trehan later joined the Kirty Party after much opposition. She proved her mettle by tolerating torture and lathi charges against injustice by the then British Raj police.

== Social Work ==
Trehan traveled the remote villages of Punjab to encourage women to cook, sew and clean. This was to promote the belief of being self dependent in times where women were not given enough support to be independent. After India's independence, Trehan continued to promote education for children and opened three girls' schools and one co-education.

Trehan was the first ever woman panch of her village panchayat council in Daduwal. Until her death in 2011, she tackled the social problems at the grassroots level – dowry, domestic violence, casteism and inter-caste marriage.

== Personal life ==
Chain and Trehan ran and hid from one location to other for the causes they believed in. They lost three of their children and their only surviving daughter Savita was left to be brought up by relatives.
