= Ponaka Kanakamma =

Indian social worker, activist and freedom fighter

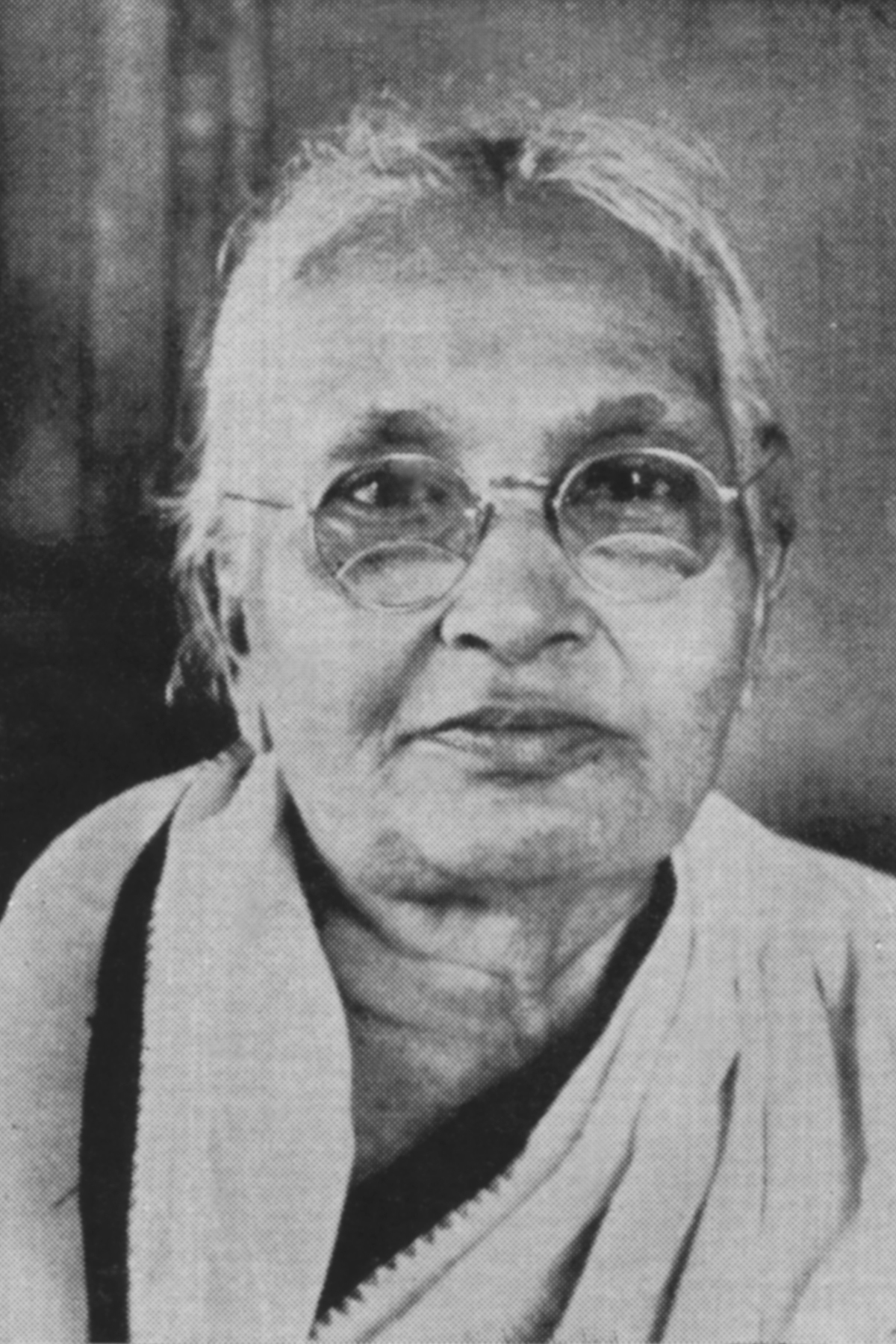
- Ponaka Kanakamma

Founder, Sahitya Academy

Personal details
- Born: 10 June 1892 Minagallu, Nellore, Andhra Pradesh
- Died: 15 September 1963 (aged 71) Nellore
- Party: Indian National Congress
- Spouse: Ponaka Subbarami Reddy

Ponaka Kanakamma (1892–1963) was an Indian social worker, activist and freedom fighter who played an important role in India's struggle for independence. She was a disciple of Mahatma Gandhi and played an important role in the Swadeshi and Khadi Movements. She also was an advocate for women's education, founding a high school for girls in Nellore called Sri Kasturidevi Vidyalayam.

== Early life ==
Ponaka Kanakamma was born in Nellore district, on 10 June 1892 at Minagallu to father Marupooru Konda Reddy and mother Kaamamma. She hailed from a wealthy landlord community and was married to her maternal uncle, Subbarama Reddy, at the age of eight. Subbarama was from Potlapudi Village, near Nellore. Her husband did not allow her to attend school, but she still taught herself Telugu, Hindi, and Sanskrit.

== Activism ==
=== Indian Independence Movement ===
Ponaka Kanakamma was involved with the Indian Independence, or "Vande Mataram", Movement from an early age. In 1907, when she was 16 years old, she hosted activists Bipin Chandra Pal and his wife during a visit to Nellore.

From 1916 to 1919, she was very actively involved in revolutionary politics. She purchased 13 acres of land in Pallipadu village about 8 miles from Nellore on the banks of river Penna and handed over the land to her revolutionary friends for concealing fire arms and for firing practice. She donated land to establish the "Pinakini Satygraha Ashram", which became a center for nonviolent resistance movement. It was inaugurated by Gandhi on April 7, 1921. Chaturuvedula Krishnaiah (C.V.Krishna), Digumarti Hanumanta Rao, his wife Krishnabai and Kondiparti Punnaya were the founder Members of the Ashram.

Kanakamma participated in non-cooperation movement and in Salt Satyagraha (1930). She was imprisoned in Rayavellore prison or 6 months in 1930 and for 13 months in 1932. She was imprisoned alongside freedom fighters such as Rajajee, Durgabai Deshmukh, and Bezawada Gopala Reddy.

=== Promotion of Education ===
With the help of her youngest brother-in-law Pattabhirama Reddy, who was involved in Library Movement, she established "Sujana Ranjani samajam" and "Vivekananda Granthalayam" in Potlapudi village, near Nellore. Her friends started libraries in nearby villages Pogadadoruvu kandrika and Kotturu. She worked for the uplift of Harijan (outcaste) and poor.

Under Gandhiji's constructive program, Kanakamma founded Sri "Kasturidevi Vidyalam" (School for Girls) on Vijayadasami Day in 1923. It was inaugurated by Sri Tanguturi Prakasam Pantulu. Gandhiji laid the foundation stone for the permanent building of the school on 12 May 1929. In 1944 Kanakamma exchanged 1-5 acres of the school site, in Pogatota Nelore for a sprawling 20 acre of land in the outskirts of Nellore and a school building was built in this site with the donation made by Sri tikkvarapu Ramireddy in around 1947 or so. Kasturi devi Vidyalam campus, is the living monument for Kanakamma. For some time, she acted as a member of AICC. She also acted as vice-president of Andhra Congress committee.

=== Writing ===
After she lost her only daughter, M.Venkatasubbamma in 1934, who was a budding writer and social worker, she became a devotee of Ramana Maharshi and Ramayogi of Annareddy palem. Ponaka Kanakamma and Dronamraju Lakshmibaiyamma were the first twin women poets in Telugu. They wrote several philosophical poems on Ramana Maharshi, most notably Aradhana and Nivedyam. They translated essence of Bhagavadgita into Telugu by name Gnana Netram. She wrote the auto-biography of Sri Rama Yogi, both in Telugu and English. Kankamma was an accomplished write and her writings appeared in Bharati, Krishnapatrika, Grihalakshmi, Anasuya, Hindusundari Jaminryot and in many other journals. She lost her property due to the tyranny and repression of Venkatagiri Zameendar. She established in 1952 an industrial training centre for poor, orphan and under-privileged women.

During her life, she hosted many eminent freedom fighters and poets at her residence in Potalpudi and in Nellore. National leaders like Babu Rajendraprasad, Desabandhu Chittaranjan Dass, artists Udayasanker, Atreya, Sthanam, Tiruvankur sisters and many others were her guests. She is the recipient of the Gruhlakshmi Swarnakankanam Sanmanam (award felicitation). On the occasion of the silver jubilee celebrations of Madras Mahila Sabha organisation, Smt. Durga Bhai Deshmukh honored Kanakamma with a silver plank. Kankamma and all other her family members are writers, whose writings are found in Bharati and in other magazines. Her youngest brother "Kala Prapurna" Marupuru Kodandarami Reddy is a famous journalist and noted writer.

She founded the Jameen Raitu, a Telugu weekly at Nellore in support of Zameendari Raitu movement in Nellore district.

== Death and Legacy ==
Kanakamma died in Nellore, on 15 September 1963.

Her autobiography in Telugu, Kanakapushyaragam, was edited by Dr. K. Purushotham and published by Mannem Rayudu of MaNaSu Foundation in 2011. On Gandhi Jayanti in 2017, Kanakammas's bronze statue was erected on the premises of Pinakini Satyagrahasrmam, Pallipadu by the Ashram Committee.

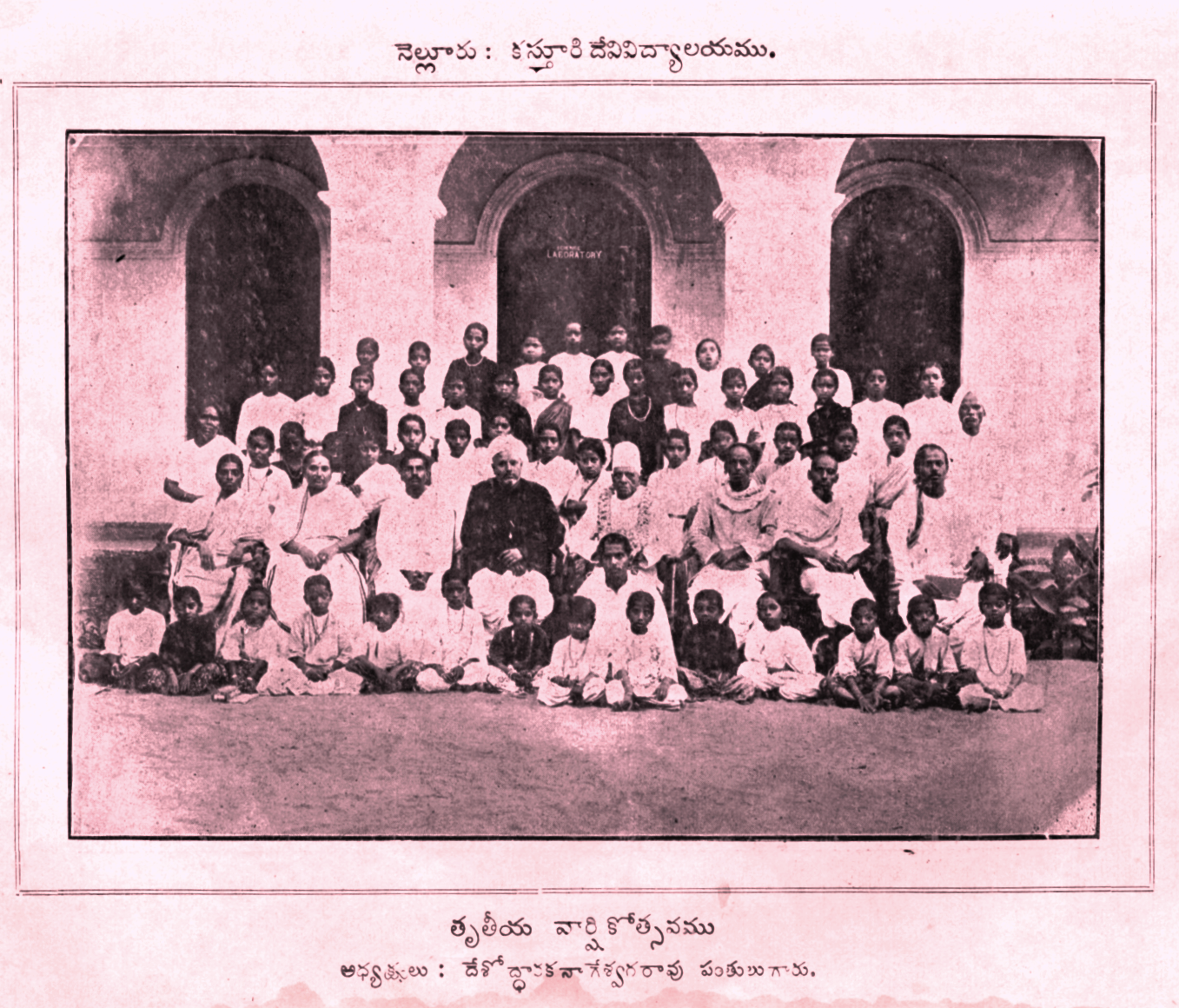
Ponaka Kanakamma on 3rd Anniversary of Kasturi Devi Girls School along with pupils

== Sources ==
- Jamiinraitu (Telugu Weekly), 1931–1980
- Vikramasimhapuri Mandala Sarvasvam-3
- A biography of Kanakamma written by Raavinootala Sri Ramulu published in the year 2006.
- Kanakapushyaraagam, an autobiography of Ponaka Kanakamma edited by Dr. K. Purushotham and published by Manasu Foundarion in the year 2011.
- Reddy Rani Monthly Journal Volumes.
- Grihalakshmi, Hidusundari, Bharathi and Krishna Patrika Volumes.
- Anasuya, Telugu Monthly volumes
- Andhra Jyoti, Sunday supplement.
- Subodhini, Nellore local Telugu weekly.
