= Tara Rani Srivastava =

Indian freedom fighter

- Born: Bihar, India
- Known for: Member of Mahatma Gandhi's Quit India Movement
- Spouse: Phulendu Babu

Tara Rani Srivastava was an Indian freedom fighter, and part of Mahatma Gandhi's Quit India Movement. She and her husband, Phulendu Babu, lived in the Saran district of Bihar. In 1942, she and her husband were leading a march in Siwan towards the police station when he was shot by police. She nonetheless continued the march, returning later to find that he had died. She remained part of the struggle for freedom until the country's independence five years later.

== Personal life and freedom struggle ==
Srivastava was born in Saran near the city of Patna. She married Phulendu Babu at an early age. Following public proposals which could have led to a surge in gender inequality, Tara Rani galvanized women from and around her village to join protest marches against the British Raj.

On 12 August 1942, called upon by Mahatma Gandhi, she and her husband organized a march to raise the Flag of India in front of the Siwan police station, an act that would be seen as "a major defiance." The police, in preventing them from hoisting the flag, lathi charged the protesters. When they were unable to gain control, the police opened fire. Phulendu Babu was among the shot and wounded. Despite that, after bandaging Babu's wounds with strips of cloth torn from her sari, Tara Rani continued her march to the police station, where she attempted to hoist the flag; on her return, she discovered that her husband had died of his injuries. On 15 August 1942, a prayer meeting was held in Chhapra in honor of her husband's sacrifice for the country. She continued to be part of the freedom struggle until the Partition of India on 15 August 1947.
