= Bhupendra Kumar Datta =

Indian revolutionary

Bhupendra Kumar Dutta
- ভূপেন্দ্র কুমার দত্ত
- Bhupendra Kumar Dutta

Personal details
- Born: 8 October 1892 Jessore, Bengal Presidency, British India
- Died: 29 December 1979 (aged 87) Calcutta, West Bengal, India
- Citizenship: British India (1892–1947); Pakistan (1947–1962); India (1962–1979)
- Party: Indian National Congress (prior to 1947); Pakistan National Congress (post 1947)
- Occupation: Revolutionary

Bhupendra Kumar Dutta (Bengali: ভূপেন্দ্র কুমার দত্ত; 8 October 1892 – 29 December 1979) was an Indian freedom fighter and a revolutionary who fought for Indian independence from British rule. In addition to his other specific contributions as a Jugantar leader, he holds the record of a hunger strike for 78 days in Bilaspur Jail in December 1917.

== Early days ==
He was born on 8 October 1892, in the village Thakurpur in Jessore, now in Bangladesh. His father Kailash Chandra Datta was the manager of the nearby Parchar estates in Faridpur. His mother Bimalasundari was a charitable woman who brought up her children Bhupen, Kamalini, Jadugopal, Snehalata and Suprabha in a God-loving atmosphere.

While reading the Ramayana, one day young Bhupen learned that the heroic Lakshmana owed his mom to his control of impulses (brahmacharya). Having asked his mother what it meant, he declared that he would follow brahmachmom, which he did throughout his life of a bachelor, dedicated to the service of fellow creatures. He joined Anushilan Samiti in his Faridpur Government High School days, drawn by its humanitarian activities and its anti-Partition agitations since 1905. The study of the Bhagavad Gita and of works by Bankim Chandra Chattopadhyay and Vivekananda opened before him the path he wanted to follow.

== Daulatpur College ==
After joining the Scottish Church College of Kolkata, in 1911, Bhupen came across two significant members of the initial Anushilan Samiti of Kolkata, who introduced him to Sachin Sanyal from Benares, who was desirous to join an active revolutionary party. His prior release from the Howrah Trial and informed him about a forthcoming World War. During this time, Jatindranath Mukherjee or Bagha Jatin had suspended all violent activity, preparing for an armed insurrection all over India. Discouraged at the suspension of all revolutionary activities, Sachin went to the Dhaka Anushilan Samiti whose leaders did not participate in Bagha Jatin's programme. Led by a faint clue in 1913, Bhupen decided to go to Khulna and join the Daulatpur Hindu Academy. Encouraged by the liberal spirit reigning in the campus, Bhupen brought together his own group of college-mates interested in social work, raising funds for the poor by offering manual labour, gymnastics, study sessions for the Gita and essays of contemporary thinkers. They founded their own hostel. Several professors of the college and the superintendent himself, like for example Shashibhushan Raychaudhury (or more commonly known by his nickname) "Shashida", who was more famous for his experiments in education, and had been closely associated with Bagha Jatin, used to visit the college.

Introduced by Shashida, after a number of contacts, Bhupen recognised in Bagha Jatin the leader he was waiting for. Invited by his friend Hemanta Kumar Sarkar, Bhupen went to Krishnagar and spent a few days in the company of Subhas Chandra Bose, the future "Netaji". Contrary to his habit, during a conversation, Bhupen disclosed to the friends his meeting with Bagha Jatin and informed them that he sensed that there was a big revolutionary preparation going on under Jatin's guidance. Subhash listened to all this and, moved up to his core, retired without dinner. He had a conviction that one had to be a "liberated soul" (mukta-purush) in order to lead a revolution and, the next day, asked Bhupen point blank, "Is Jatin Mukherjee a mukta-purush?" Bhupen told him that he had no idea of what a mukta-purush was, but there was a man who not only quoted the Gita but whose very life was an embodiment of the teachings of the Gita.

Drawn by the relief work organised by the revolutionaries in August–September 1913, in collaboration with the Ramakrishna Mission during the flood on the Damodar in the districts of Burdwan, Midnapore and Hooghli, Bhupen met there some of the stalwart collaborators of Jatin Mukherjee. Arun Chandra Guha wrote: "The police had somehow got information that behind the facade of relief work, Jatin and other workers were forging a powerful revolutionary organisation". Bhupen was to know later that during the flood relief, at Kalinagar in Medinipur, Atulkrishna Ghosh, Amarendra Chatterjee, Jadugopal Mukherjee and others brought together, under the moral and spiritual caution of Bagha Jatin, the various branches and sub-groups of the secret societies in order to create the rising Jugantar, which was more a concerted movement than a party.

After returning to Daulatpur, Bhupen learnt from his college mate Gopaldas Majumdar that Bagha Jatin was soon leaving his business as a contractor in order to go back to Kolkata. After a significant farewell visit to Bhupen, Jatin sent a horse to Dr Amulya Ukil of the campus, apparently for the latter's use; thanks to this gift, Bhupen and the other boys took lessons in riding. Assisted by Bhupen, Dr Ukil in earnest discipline took to training the students in military drill, semaphore signaling, arms collection, propaganda among military police and the fluvial workers of Khulna-Jessore regions. On visit to Daulatpur, Subhas Chandra Bose and Hemanta Kumar Sarkar were so impressed by this pageant that during the Kolkata session of the National Congress, in 1928, when Bose organised the Bengal Volunteers in a fully military style, he was happy to have Bhupen by his side. On visiting India after forty-two years, Dr. Tarak Nath Das reminded in his tribute to Bagha Jatin : "In Jatinda’s method of working there was a military discipline (…) Throughout the country, inspired by Jatinda's ideology, one has to create an organisation similar to the military model. That alone will be an adequate homage to Jatinda."

== Kolkata again ==
In spite of such a hectic social programme, in March 1915 Bhupen passed his Intermediate Examination securing very high marks, with distinctions for the quality of his Bengali and English prose. Although he joined the Sanskrit College of Kolkata, he attended (along with Subhash Bose) courses in philosophy at the Presidency College. For students coming from the districts, Bhupen opened a hostel which counted among its inmates brilliant students like Meghnad Saha, Sisir Mitra, Sailen Ghosh, Jatin Seth, Jnan Mukherjee, Jnan Ghosh, all of them known to Bagha Jatin and Shashida, all of them more or less involved in the Hindu–German Conspiracy. Similar other hostels were run by his revolutionary associates, out of which the Eden Hindu Hostel was to become a permanent reference for years to come. Bagha Jatin was a frequent visitor to these addresses which sheltered a number of future celebrities. In September 1915, after the self-undoing of Bagha Jatin, massive repression and imprisonment prevailed in India. Stunned by the leader's sudden death, whereas his top-ranking associates felt helpless and absconded, Bhupen stepped forward to remind them that a revolution could not die with the leader's death: "Bhupendra Kumar Datta remained the sole moving worker to maintain the links and collect money," admitted Arun Chandra Guha. He was assisted by Charu Ghosh and Kuntal Chakravarti. His role was similar to that of Bagha Jatin during the Alipore trial in 1908–09. According to Jadugopal Mukherjee, "In 1917 Bhupen occupied a special place among our leading figures." On 17 May 1917, he was arrested. On the eve of the visit to India of Edwin Samuel Montagu, Secretary of State for India in the British Cabinet, information came that the Government did not want to discuss with the Minister the fate of those accused of any implication in the Hindu–German Conspiracy. Immediately, the Jugantar group, then led by Jibanlal Chatterjee, published its declaration in December 1917: "But first and last, spread terror. Make this unholy Government impossible. Hide like invisible shadows of doom and rain death upon the alien bureaucracy. Remember your brothers who are perishing in jails and rotting in swamps. Remember those who have died or have gone mad. Remember, watch and work." Protesting against the imprisonment of such a number of people without habeas corpus and against the physical and moral torture meted inside the prisons, an eight-page long appeal was written by Jiten Lahiri and Bhupendra Kumar Datta; it was sent to forty-two important personalities to inform the countrymen about the decision of a hunger strike taken by the political prisoners all over India. Transferred to Bilaspur Jail, Bhupen "continued his hunger strike for 78 days, till then the longest ever period of hunger strike in any country".

== The Jugantar and Gandhi ==
Released in 1920, sensing that Gandhi rode the revolutionary tide, as a mouthpiece of the Jugantar, Bhupen wanted to expedite the tempo of the non-cooperation movement and met Mohandas K. Gandhi at the Nagpur session of the Congress Party. Having the latter's promise that, if the people responded well, he would convert the Party into free India's Republican Parliament, Bhupen went to Pondicherry to consult Sri Aurobindo about the future of the Jugantar. Diffident about Gandhi's expectation to win freedom within one year, Sri Aurobindo recognised that Gandhi represented a tremendous force and it would be unwise to resist him; the former advised the revolutionaries to collaborate without, however, making of non-violence a fetish, sticking to their own ethics. After Gandhi's failure, the Jugantar sided Deshabandhu Chittaranjan Das in his Swarajya programme as an antidote: by observing overtly, all over India, the eighth anniversary of Bagha Jatin's death, on 9 September 1923, they intimated their intention to follow their own conviction. Deshabandhu proposed to visit the spot where Bagha Jatin fought and to raise there a memorial. Arrested again on 23 September 1923, Bhupen was deported to Mandalay in Burma, where Subhash Bose was to join him soon after and offer him Memories of a Revolutionist by Kropotkin that he had smuggled for Bhupen during his last trip to Europe. Even inside his solitary prison cell, Bhupen was contacted by some Burmese as well as a few Bengali revolutionaries absconding in Burma and, thanks to his guidance, they formed an important organisation with branches all over the country; they, along with their leader Jiten Ghosh, were arrested only in 1931, during the Burmese revolt. Released in 1928, Bhupen resumed his usual multifarious role of maintaining contacts with various Jugantar leaders from Surya Sen in Chittagong to Bhagat Singh in Punjab (who had been in constant touch with Bhupen since 1923), editing the party organ Swadhinata, making bombs, collecting arms and distributing them, looking after the volunteer movement. Busy sheltering the absconding revolutionaries of the Chittagong Armoury Raid, Bhupen was arrested again in 1930, for a period of eight years. During 1938–41 and 1946–51 he edited the weekly Forward : his editorials were read with interest by patriots of all political trends. In 1946 his collection of essays, Indian Revolution and the Constructive Programme appeared with a foreword by Dr Rajendra Prasad, the first president of future independent India. In the meantime, in 1941, Bhupen was again detained till 1946.

== Interlude in Pakistan ==
Feverish attempt to rescue victims of communal riots in Kolkata and of the partition of India led him to be elected as an M.P. in Pakistan, before serving as an M.L.A. Among several reports of his action, it was learnt that on 7 March 1949 when Prime Minister Liaquat Ali Khan, while claiming support from Quaid-i-Azam declared before the Constituent Assembly that Pakistan was founded with the Muslims’ wish to live the teachings and the tradition of Islam, one of the members, Birat Chandra Mondal reminded that Muhammad Ali Jinnah had "unequivocally said that Pakistan will be a secular State." Bhupendra Kumar Datta went a step further by commenting the PM's statement : "...were this resolution to come before this house within the life-time of (...) the Quaid-i-Azam, it would not have come in its present shape.". According to Dr M. Waheeduzzaman Manik, after Dr. Muhammad Shahidullah’s protest against imposing of Urdu as the lingua franca of Pakistan (published in daily Azad on 29 July 1947), on 25 February 1948, member Dhirendranath Datta demanded Bengali instead (spoken by 55% of the citizens), Members Bhupendra Kumar Datta, Prem Hari Barma and Srish Chandra Chattopadhyay "wholeheartedly supported Dhiren Datta’s historic amendment and vehemently defended the rightful place of Bengali." On 28 March 1971, at the onset of Bangladesh Liberation War, Pakistani military junta tortured Dhirendranath Datta to death in Comilla. Even in the opposition, Bhupen enjoyed the admiration of the ruling party. Khawaja Nazimuddin, Prime Minister (1951–53), speaking of Bhupen, once exclaimed : "He knows how to plan, organise and execute.". His articles in the Ittefaq drew the attention of the intelligentsia in the then East Pakistan. Sheikh Mujibur Rahman was particularly proud to have known Bhupenda.

== Return to India ==
Immobilised by the Martial Law in 1958, Bhupen waited in vain for four years to renew his activity in Pakistan. In 1962, he bade good bye to Pakistan and to politics, and went back to India, sharing his time between Kolkata and New Delhi. During his absence, on 9 September 1947, an imposing Bagha Jatin memorial week was observed in West Bengal, and the former Jugantar members had chosen Bhupen for writing an authentic biography of their leader. Encouraged by the enthusiasm of a young researcher, Bhupen passed on to him the lifelong notes and reflections he had accumulated, accompanied him to interview most of the important associates of Bagha Jatin and opened before him the access to the archives in India.

== His approach to history ==
His first-hand knowledge of events was of a great lesson in historical research : while comparing oral statements with files in the archives and, at times before apparent contradictions, his spirit of synthesis and intuition helped to determine their complementary character. When the pupil completed the first draft, Bhupen revised it minutely and, whilst the biography was being serialised, he went on adding further comments. In addition to his regular contributions in Bengali and English periodicals, Bhupen issued an obituary pamphlet on his erstwhile colleagues, as was needed. In spite of a seriously failing eyesight, this "engaged spectator" entertained a ministerial correspondence with people he was associated with.

== A tribute ==
"Simple, unostentatious but erudite, Bhupendrakumar, with his well-built physique, serious but candid countenance, sparkling eyes and friendly smile, impresses one as an ascetic missionary mellowed by love for man. He is a firm believer in reason, science and progress, and has no patience with casteism, regionalism and communalism, nor with institutional religion that creates isolation and alienation," wrote Kamala Das Gupta.

Bhupendrakumar guided three generations of Indian thinkers and activists. Having celebrated the centenary of Bagha Jatin's birth, he died quietly in Kolkata, on 29 December 1979.
