= Ullaskar Dutta =

Indian revolutionary (1885–1965)

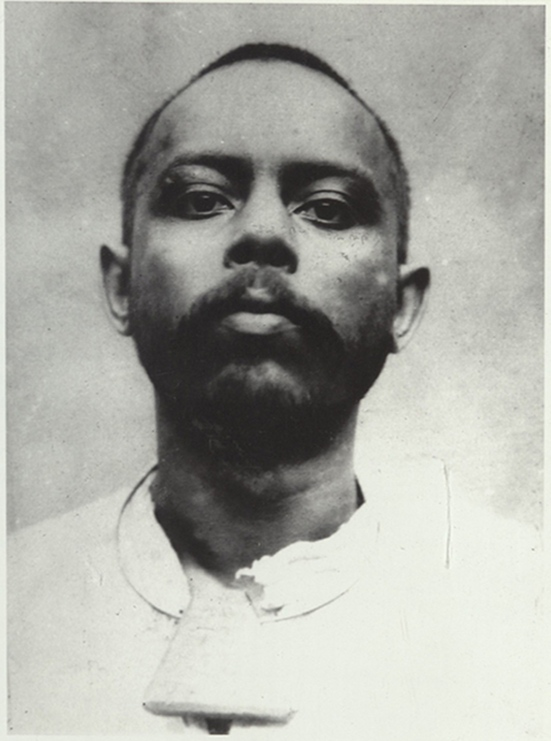
- Born: 16 April 1885; Kalikaccha, Brahmanbaria, Bengal Presidency, British India
- Died: 17 May 1965 (aged 80); Silchar, Assam, India
- Education: Presidency University
- Occupation: Indian independence activist
- Organisations: Jugantar; Anushilan Samiti
- Known for: Freedom Struggle
- Movement: Indian Independence movement

Ullaskar Dutta (16 April 1885 – 17 May 1965) was an Indian revolutionary associated with Anushilan Samiti and Jugantar of Bengal, and was a close associate of Barindra Ghosh. He was the principal bomb maker of the Jugantar group until Hemchandra Kanungo returned from Paris learning political theory and explosive chemistry.

== Early life ==
Ullaskar was born on 16 April 1885 to a Bengali Baidya family in the village of Kalikachha, Sarail, then located under the Brahmanbaria subdivision of the Bengal Province's Tipperah District (present-day Bangladesh). His father Dwijadas Duttagupta was a member of the Brahmo Samaj and had a degree in agriculture from the University of London. After passing entrance examination in 1903, he took admission in the Presidency College, Kolkata and his passion was for the subject Chemistry. However, he was rusticated from the college for hitting a British professor, Professor Russell, who made some derogatory comment about Bengalis.

== Revolutionary activities ==
Ullaskar was a member of the Jugantar party and he became expert in bomb-making. Khudiram Bose used a bomb manufactured by Ullaskar and Hem Chandra Das in an attempt to murder the notorious magistrate, Kingsford. However, police caught many members of the Jugantar group including Ullaskar Dutta, Barindra Ghosh and Khudiram.

== Trial and sentence ==
In the famous Alipore bomb case, Ullaskar was arrested on 2 May 1908 and he was sentenced to death by hanging in 1909. Later, on appeal, the verdict was reduced to transportation for life and he was deported to the Cellular Jail in Andaman.

== Cellular jail ==
Ullaskar was subjected to brutal torture and repeated electrocution in the Cellular Jail and is said have lost his mental balance. He was set free in 1920 and he returned to Kolkata.

== Later life ==
Ullaskar was again arrested in 1931 and sentenced to 18 months imprisonment. He returned to his home village Kalikachha when colonial rule ended in 1947. After a lonely life of 10 years, he returned to Kolkata in 1957. After returning to Kolkata, he married his childhood friend Lila, daughter of Bipin Chandra Pal, who at the time was physically challenged and widowed. He went to Silchar, the district town of Cachar District of Assam and spent his later life there. He died on 17 May 1965 in Silchar. Recently, two roads in Kolkata and Silchar were named after him.

== Works ==
- Dvipantarer Katha (The Tale of Deportation)
- Amar Karajiban (lit. 'My Prison Life') (translated into English as Twelve Years of Prison Life in 1924).
