= Ramoshi =

Indian community

Regions with significant populations
- Maharashtra • Madhya Pradesh • Karnataka

Religion
- Hinduism

The Ramoshi are an Indian community found largely in Maharashtra, Madhya Pradesh, and Karnataka. They are classified in the Other Backward Class category by the government of India.

They are considered to be a branch of the Kanadi Berads. Members of the community refer to themselves as Ramvanshi (descendants of Rama), from which the caste name "Ramoshi" is derived. According to community tradition, when Rama was in exile, his brother Bharata went to meet him and subsequently brought the local forest dwellers back to Ayodhya. Upon Rama's return, Bharata arranged a meeting between them, after which Rama appointed the forest dwellers as village watchmen (rakhandar) and permitted them to adopt the name Ramvanshi.

== Social structure ==
The Ramoshi consider themselves to belong to the Kshatriya varna. The community is divided into two major sub-sects, Purandar Ramoshi and Holga Ramoshi.

Inter-dining and intermarriage are prohibited between these two sub-sects. Additionally, marriages are forbidden between individuals belonging to the same surname clan (kul) or between clans that share the same family deity (kuldaivat).

== Physical characteristics and language ==
Members of the Ramoshi community are described as tall, sturdy, robust, and dark-complexioned. They traditionally wear a neck chain (kanthi) and a Sulemani gando around the neck, which they believe protects them from evil spirits. Their diet includes various types of meat, with the exception of beef.

Historically, the Ramoshi spoke the Telugu language, but over time they adopted Marathi. They also maintain a secret coded language (sanketik bhasa) that was historically used during thefts or confidential transactions.

== Religious beliefs and culture ==
The Ramoshi worship deities such as Rama, Khandoba (Mahadev), and Krishna, while also respecting saints and pirs. When taking a solemn vow in the name of Khandoba, they hold turmeric powder (bhandara) in their hands and strictly fulfill the oath until its completion. They venerate animals such as the Nandi, monkeys, and cows. During Nag Panchami, they worship snakes, and on Dasara, they worship horses.

The community celebrates the festival of Shigmo with great enthusiasm, singing explicit songs throughout the night.

== Customs and rituals ==
=== Birth rituals ===
The birth of a male child is celebrated by beating a metal plate (thali), whereas the birth of a female child brings grief. Following the birth of a boy, members of other communities—such as the Kunbi, Dhangar, Gavali, Koli, Mhar, and Mang—visit the house to offer grain blessings (shitado).

On the fifth day after birth, the family performs the Panchvi ritual and conducts an all-night vigil (jagaran). On the twelfth day, five to seven stones are set up by the roadside and worshipped. Birth pollution (suyer) is observed by the household. The child's name is chosen by a Deshastha Brahmin or a Jangam. When the child reaches two to three months of age, they are taken to visit local deities such as Satvai or Ekai. The first hair-cutting ritual (javal) is performed by offering the cut hair before the deity alongside a goat sacrifice.

=== Marriage rituals ===
Cross-cousin marriage—specifically marrying the daughter of one's paternal aunt or maternal uncle—is practiced. The marriage proposal is initiated by the groom's father at the bride's house. Prior to the main wedding ceremonies and the installation of the family deity (devak), a goat is sacrificed inside the wedding canopy (matav).

During the wedding procession, the groom carries a dagger (khanjir) and travels on horseback. Upon reaching the bride's village, a member of the Mhar community performs a welcoming ritual (awal). The groom's party then visits a local temple, where members of the bride's side break a papad on the groom's head.

Inside the wedding canopy, two piles of rice are prepared:

- The groom stands on one heap facing west, holding a dagger in one hand and a coconut in the other.
- The bride stands facing him on the second heap of rice.

This core ritual is known as kanyadaan. The following day, the groom takes the bride to his home, where a community feast (chavder gaonjevan) is hosted by his family. Marriage ceremonies are officiated by Deshastha Brahmins or Jangams. Remarriage for widows (goraj muhurtar) is permitted and officiated by a Jangam priest, with attendance restricted exclusively to men.

=== Death rituals ===
The Ramoshi practice burial for the deceased. When a person is near death, their heir places the dying individual's head on their lap and performs acts of charity. Ancestral rites (shraddha) are observed during the period of Pitru Paksha.

== History and occupation ==
Historically, some members of the community engaged in robbery and dacoity. Their traditional weapons included bows and arrows, slingshots (gofani), axes, and wooden staffs. Under the Maratha Empire, they were employed as village watchmen and guardians (palegari).

During the period of British rule, their employment responsibilities were reduced, and their land grants (inam) were seized, leading many to resort back to dacoity. However, they adhered to a strict code of ethics regarding loyalty to salt, refraining from stealing from any home whose salt they had consumed.

The Ramoshi are traditionally classified as part of the Bara Balutedar system (the twelve traditional hereditary village servants). In modern times, they primarily engage in agriculture, salaried employment, and other professions.

== History ==
The Ramoshi in Maharashtra were earlier known as Vedan.

They were then classified as a criminal tribe under the Criminal Tribes Acts of the Raj.

== Culture ==
They belong to the Hindu section while some are Vaishanavas.
