= Jadugopal Mukherjee =

Indian politician and revolutionary

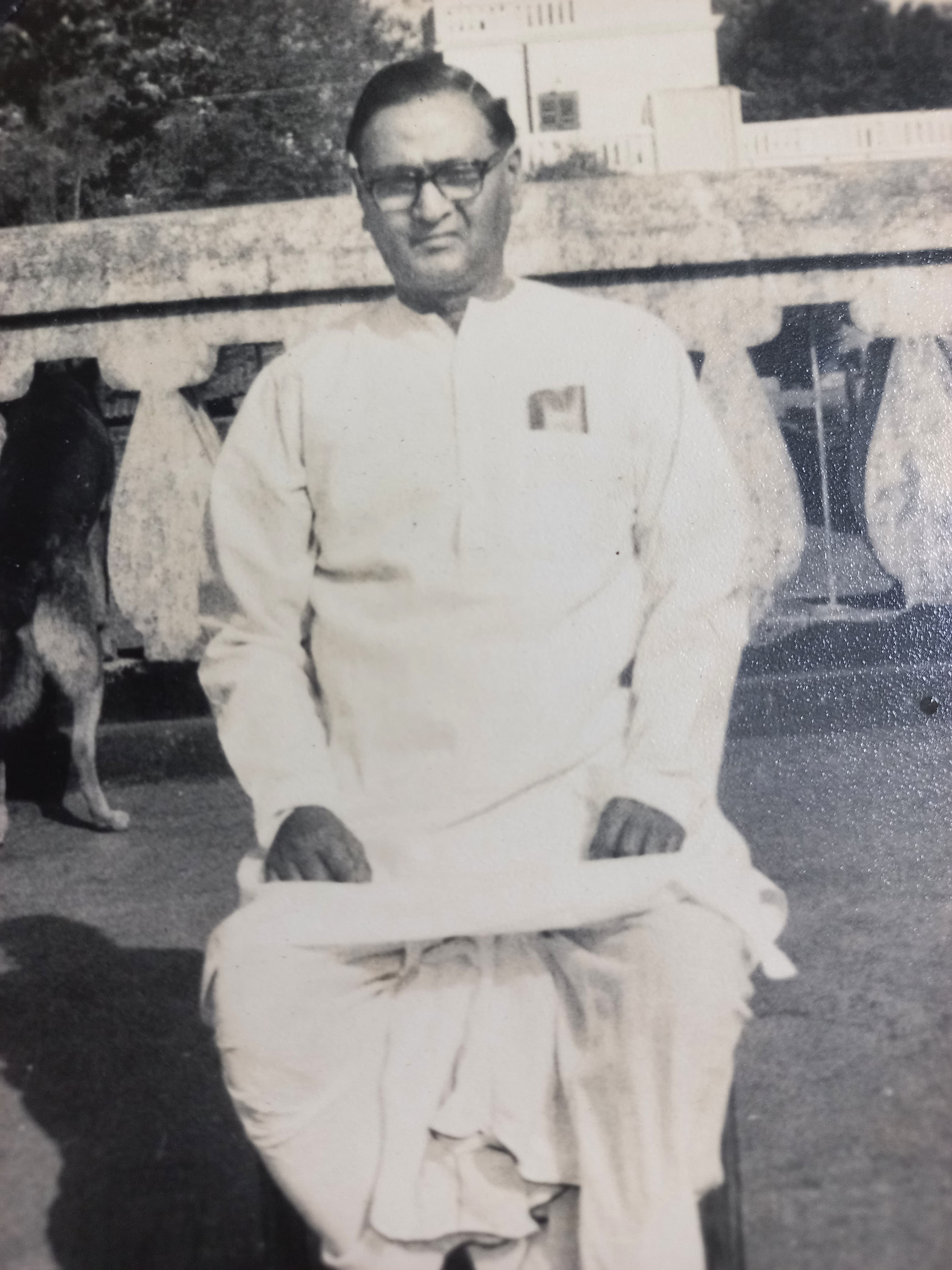
- Jadugopal Mukherjee on floor of his home at Ranchi, 1960
- Born: 18 September 1886; Tamluk, British India
- Died: 30 August 1976 (aged 89)
- Occupation: Freedom fighter
- Organization(s): Jugantar, Hindustan Republican Association
- Movement: Indian Independence Movement

Jadu Gopal Mukherjee (18 September 1886 – 30 August 1976) was a Bengali Indian revolutionary who, as the successor of Jatindranath Mukherjee or Bagha Jatin, led the Jugantar members to recognise and accept Gandhi's movement as the culmination of their own aspiration.

== Early life ==
Jadugopal or Jadu was born at Tamluk in the district of Medinipur on the bank of the Rupnarayan River in West Bengal, where his father Kishorilal practised law and distinguished himself as a Kheyal singer. The family came from Beniatola in north Kolkata. Jadu's mother Bhubanmohini hailed from a Vaishnava family and transmitted in her children a spirit of devotion. Jadu's younger brother was to settle in the US and to be known in the West the famous writer and cultural scholar Dhan Gopal Mukerji. As an upper class student of the Duff School in Kolkata, Jadu learnt to think patriotically, thanks to one of his teachers. He became a member of the Kolkata Anushilan Party in 1905, attracted by its physical culture and, on the foil of the Partition, by its political climate. He writes in his autobiography that the single-handed fight of Bagha Jatin with a Royal Bengal tiger thrilled him and his friends in 1906, and he had an impression of belonging to a heroic epoch. After the F.A. examination, in 1908, Jadu entered the Calcutta Medical College. Fond of observing and analysing the rising tide of patriotism and the Government measures to repress them, Jadu preferred remaining aloof, confining himself to a couple of close friends.

== First World War ==
Relief work during the 1913 Damodar floods brought Jadu close to Bagha Jatin and the latter's important associates. Busy cementing the regional units for organising an armed insurrection during the forthcoming War, Jatin designated Rash Behari Bose as the responsible for Upper India. Though jealous of Naren Bhattacharya's proximity with Jatin, Jadu received the charge of developing the external links, mainly with Taraknath Das in California and Virendranath Chattopadhyay in Germany. With the failure of the Indo-German Plan and Bagha Jatin's sudden death in 1915, finding Atulkrishna Ghosh, the legitimate right-hand man of Jatin, plunged in a momentary despair, Jadu replaced him and asked the revolutionaries to disperse. During Jadu's absence, Bhupendra Kumar Datta maintained the leadership till his arrest in 1917.

== Absconding leader comes home ==
Hiding in the hilly forests of Assam-Burma and Tibeto-Bhutan frontiers, Jadu was informed about the impact of the revolutionaries' activities on the Imperialists and about the question of a possible concession of constitutional reforms with the Rowlatt Act at the end of World War I. Returning home in 1921, Jadu obtained a special permission to sit for the Medical degree Examination and passed it with record results in 1922. After Gandhi's first failure, according to their initial contract, the Jugantar members worked under Deshbandhu Chittaranjan Das and Satyendra Chandra Mitra to form the alternative Swaraj movement and they declared their new programme by celebrating the 8th anniversary of Bagha Jatin's self-giving on 9 September 1923, from Bengal to Punjab.

After receiving a message from Lala Har Dayal, Pandit Ram Prasad Bismil went to Allahabad where he drafted the constitution of Hindustan Republican Association in the winter season of 1923 with the help of Dr. Jadugopal Mukherjee and Sachindra Nath Sanyal both of these revolutionaries were from Bengal. The basic name and aims of the organisation were typed on a Yellow Paper in Allahabad.

Alerted by this, the British authorities immediately arrested the radicals; arrested for the first time, Jadu was detained under the State Prisoners' Regulation for four years. Released in 1927, he was externed from Bengal. Settled in Ranchi, he earned an outstanding reputation in TB treatment. He married Amiyarani Chaudhuri in 1934 and had two sons. At this juncture, he succeeded in bringing together the Jugantar and the Anushilan radicals, creating the short-lived federated Karmi-Sangha; under the pretext that Subhas Chandra Bose and the Jugantar leaders were indifferent to their efficiency, the members of the Anushilan put an end to this fusion.

Jadu took the initiative, in 1938, and announced that the Jugantar stopped existing as a Party distinct from the Congress, extending its full support to Gandhi. Arrested again for helping Gandhi to organise the Quit India movement, in 1942, he was released two years later. He disagreed with the Congress compromise on vital issues such as complete independence and partition of India, and he resigned in 1947. He died in 1976.
