= Khudiram Bose (film) =

- Directed by: Vidya Sagar Raju
- Screenplay by: Vidya Sagar Raju
- Story by: Vidya Sagar Raju
- Produced by: Vijay Jagarlamudi
- Starring: Rakesh Jagarlamudi; Atul Kulkarni; Nassar; Vivek Oberoi; Shourya SreeKere
- Cinematography: Rasool Ellore
- Edited by: Marthand K. Venkatesh
- Music by: Mani Sharma
- Production company: Golden Rain Productions
- Release date: December 2022
- Country: India
- Language: Telugu

Khudiram Bose is a 2022 Indian Telugu-language biographical film about Indian revolutionary leader Khudiram Bose The film stars Rakesh Jagarlamudi in the title role, with production design, and stunts helmed by Thota Tharani, and Kanal Kannan respectively. The film is featured in the Indian Panorama section of the 53rd International Film Festival of India.

== Premise ==
This is a film about Midnapore born Khudiram Bose's journey. The first youngest freedom fighter, who was hanged at the age of 18.

== Cast ==
- Rakesh Jagarlamudi as Khudiram Bose
- Nassar as Bal Gangadhar Tilak
- Atul Kulkarni as Barindra Kumar Ghosh
- Vivek Oberoi as Narendra Kumar Bose
- Shourya SreeKere as Sushil Sen
- Abhiram Kanumilli as Prafulla Chaki
- María Luz Tremsal as Sister Nivedita

== Awards and honours ==
Year	Award / Festival	Category	Result	Ref.
2022	53rd International Film Festival of India	Selected for the Indian Panorama section	Won	
2022	International Film Festival of India	Positive audience response at IFFI Goa	Nominated	
