= Emperor v. Aurobindo Ghosh and Others =

Alipore Bomb case

Emperor v Aurobindo Ghosh and many others, colloquially referred to as the Alipore Bomb Case, the Muraripukur conspiracy, or the Manicktolla bomb conspiracy, was a revolutionary activity held in India in 1908. The case saw the trial of a number of Indian nationalists of the Anushilan Samiti in Calcutta, on charges of "Waging war against the Government" of the British Raj. The trial was held at Alipore Sessions Court, Calcutta, between May 1908 and May 1909. The trial followed in the wake of the attempt on the life of Presidency Magistrate Douglas Kingsford in Muzaffarpur by Bengali nationalists Khudiram Bose and Prafulla Chaki in April 1908, which was recognised by the Bengal police as linked to attacks against the Raj in the preceding years, including attempts to derail the train carrying Lieutenant-Governor Sir Andrew Fraser in December 1907.

Among the famous accused were Aurobindo Ghosh, his brother Barin Ghosh as well as 38 other Bengali nationalists of the Anushilan Samiti. Most of the accused were arrested from Barin Ghosh's Garden house at 36 Murarirupukur Road, in the Manicktolla suburb of Calcutta. They were held in the Presidency Jail in Alipore before the trial, where Narendranath Goswami, approver and crown-witness, was shot dead by two fellow accused Kanailal Dutta and Satyendranath Bose within the jail premises. Goswami's murder led to collapse of the case against Aurobindo. However, his brother Barin and a number of others were convicted of the charges and faced varying jail terms from life-imprisonment to shorter jail terms.

Aurobindo Ghosh retired from active nationalist politics after serving a prison sentence awarded in the trial, beginning his journey into spirituality and philosophy that he described as having started with revelations that occurred to him during his incarceration. He later moved to Pondicherry, establishing an Ashram. For Anushilan Samiti, the incarceration of many of its prominent leaders led to a decline in the influence and activity of the Manicktolla branch, and its activities were overtaken by what emerged to be called the Jugantar branch under the leadership of Bagha Jatin.

== Background ==
=== Anushilan samiti ===
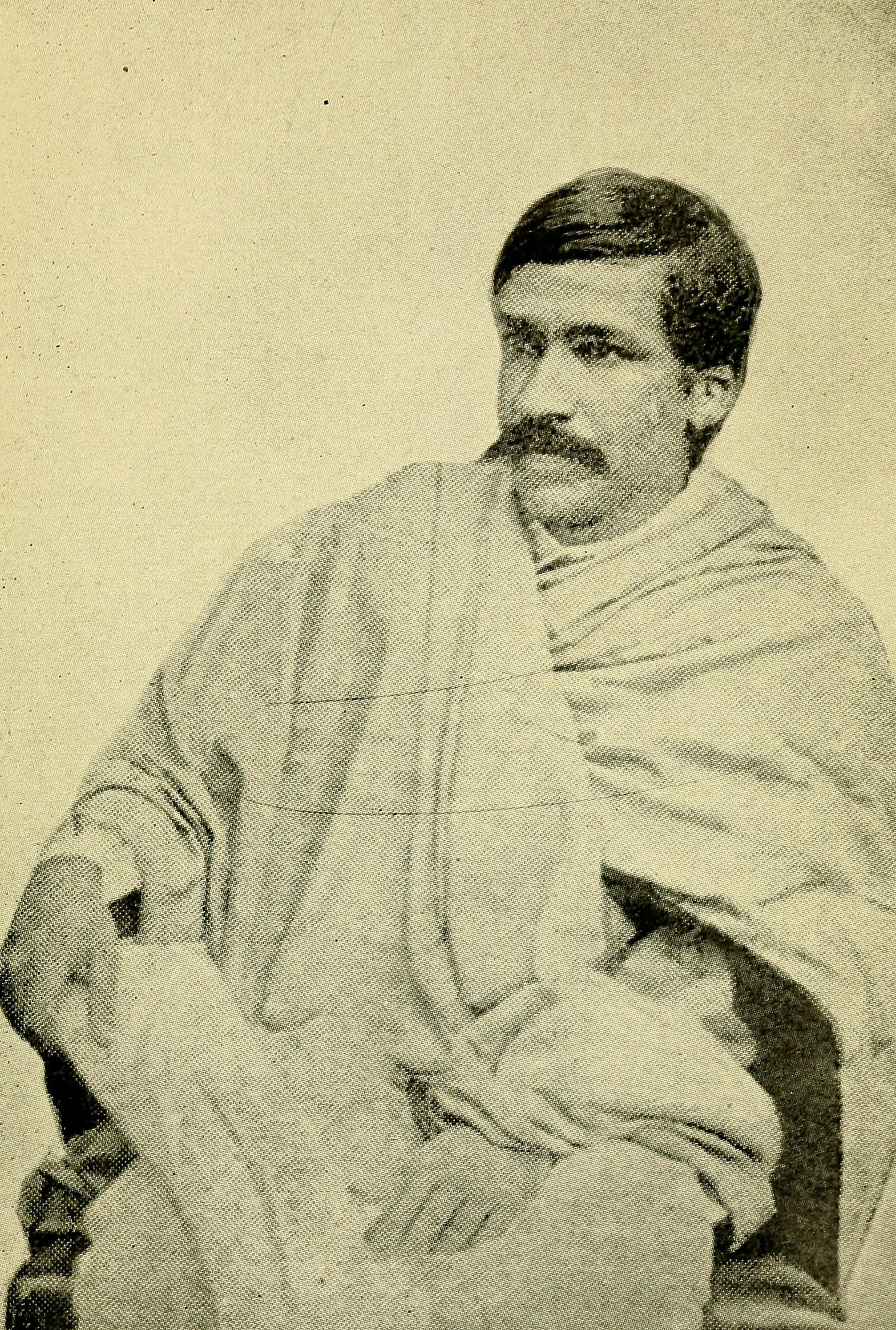
Aurobindo Ghosh

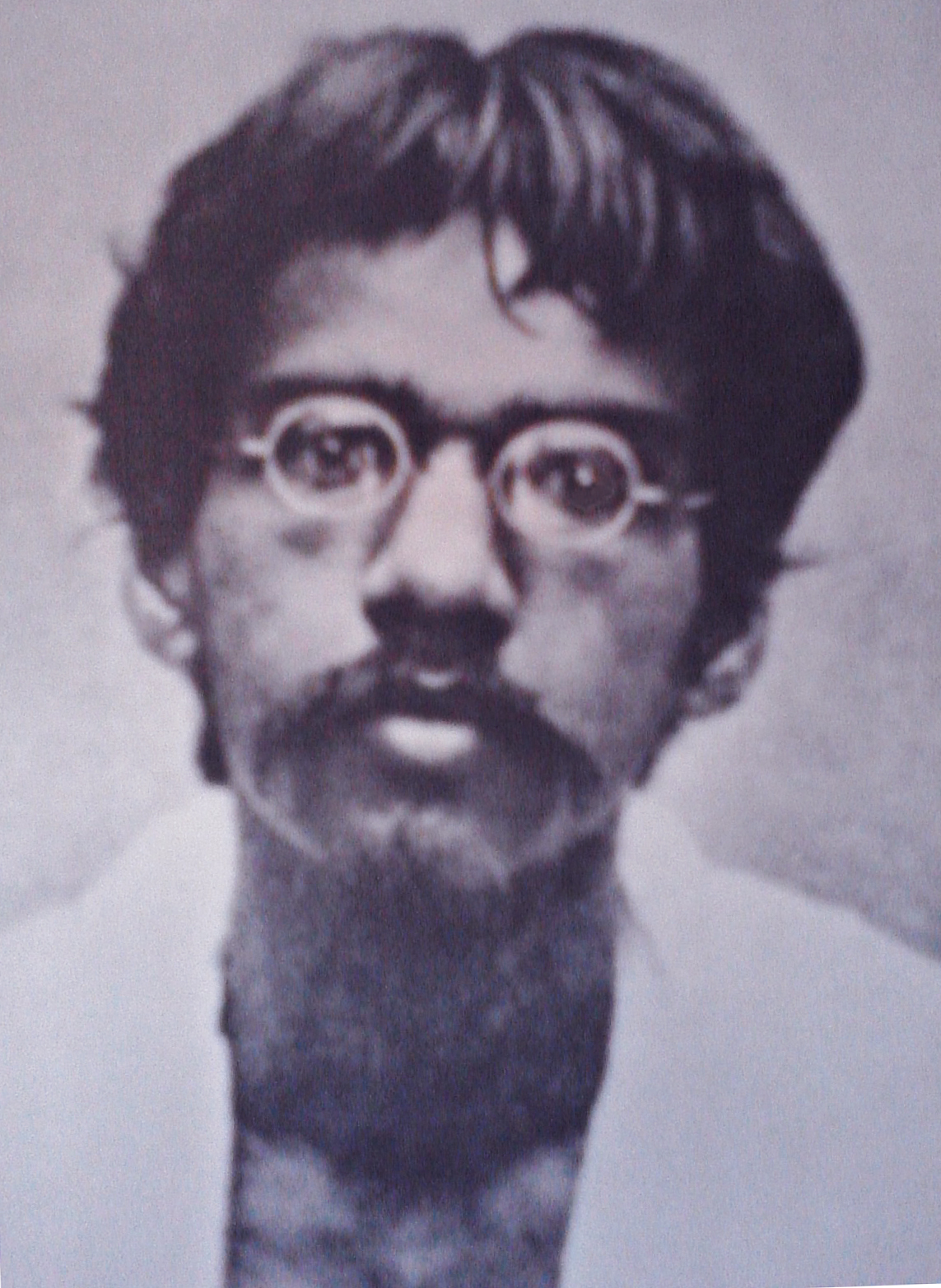
Barindra Kumar Ghosh

Political consciousness and opposition to British Raj in Bengal had grown steadily over the last decades of the 1800s. By 1902, Calcutta had three secret societies working toward the violent overthrow of British rule in India. These included the Anushilan Samity, founded by a Calcutta student named Satish Chandra Basu with the patronage of the Calcutta barrister Pramatha Mitra, another led by a Bengalee lady by the name of Sarala Devi Chaudhurani, and a third one founded by Aurobindo Ghosh. Ghosh was one of the strongest proponents of militant nationalism at the time. Having forsaken a potential career in the Indian Civil Service, Ghosh had returned to India and taken up an academic post under the patronage of the Maharaja of Baroda. Here he came to develop a close relationship with Indian Maratha nationalist Bal Gangadhar Tilak, and through him the nationalist network in Maharashtra. Inspired by the histories of Italian and Irish nationalism, Aurobindo began preparing the grounds and network for an Indian nationalist revolution, in which he found support in Tilak. Aurobindo sought for source of military training to prepare for a revolution in the future. His younger brother Barin joined Aurobindo in Baroda. Baroda offered Barin to obtain training in military strategies and armed conflicts. In 1903, Aurobindo Ghosh sent his younger brother Barindra Kumar Ghosh to Calcutta to rally the nascent organisation. By 1905, the controversial 1905 partition of Bengal had a widespread political impact: it stimulated radical nationalist sentiments in the Bhadralok community in Bengal, and helped Anushilan acquire a support base among of educated, politically conscious and disaffected young in local youth societies throughout Bengal. The works of Aurobindo and his brother Barin Ghosh allowed Anushilan Samity to spread through Bengal. Anushilan began a program of slowly building a support base, preparing slowly and steadily for a nationalist uprising, on the lines of the Italian Carbonari.

Aurobindo returned to Bengal in 1906, and with the assistance of Subodh Mallik and Bipin Chandra Pal, founded in 1907 the radical Bengali nationalist publication of Jugantar and its English counterpart Bande Mataram. After a slow start, the journal gradually grew to acquire a mass appeal in Bengal through its radicalist approach and message of revolutionary programmes. Aurobindo, active in nationalist politics in the Congress, increasingly became the prominent voice of radical nationalists including Bal Gangadhar Tilak and Bipin Pal who advocated break-away from Britain and justified violent revolution as a means to this end. Nationalist writings and publications by Aurobindo and his brother Barin included Bande Mataram, Jugantar had a widespread impact among the youth of Bengal. By 1907 it was selling 7,000 copies, which later rose to 20,000. Its message, aimed at elite politically conscious readers was essentially critique and defiance of British rule in India, and justification of political violence. The publication inspired a proportion of the young men who joined Anushilan Samiti cited the influence of Jugantar in their decisions. In 1907, Bipin Chandra Pal and Aurobindo faced prosecution for the message emanating from Bande Mataram, with Pal being convicted. Meanwhile, Jugantar was also subject to close scrutiny.

=== 32 Muraripukur Garden House ===
Muraripukur garden house, in the Manicktolla suburbs of Calcutta. This served as the headquarters of Barin Ghosh and his associates.

By 1907, Barin Ghosh had begun gathering around groups of young men attracted to the Jugantar message. This was at a time that the Dhaka Anushilan Samiti under Pulin Das was becoming active in seeking to target British administrative officers and interests as targets. Police searches and surveillance of Jugantar became routine, and the younger Ghosh cut his ties with the paper. A close group of approximately a dozen young men gathered around Barin, some of whom lived in his garden house in 36 Muraripukur lane, in the Manicktolla suburb of Calcutta. The house was intended by Barin to be organised along the lines of an ashram or hermitage along the lines of Aurobindo's message in Bhawani mandir, away from the public eye, where revolutionaries could live in strict discipline and prepare for a future revolution. Barin's group had been experimenting with production of explosives from 1906. In 1907, they were joined by Ullaskar Dutt, a self-taught chemist from the Howrah suburb of Calcutta who was attracted to the Jugantar message. The group had targeted the Lieutenant Governor of Bengal since 1906. In autumn 1906, Charu Chandra Dutt and Prafulla Chaki had made a failed attempt to assassinate the governor at Darjeeling. With Dutta's expertise, the plans were revisited. By October that year, Dutta was in a position to manufacture a bomb powerful enough to blow up a train. With dynamite obtained by Barin's group, Dutt produced a bomb with a detonator of his own manufacturing. The intended target was the train carrying the lieutenant governor of Bengal, Andrew Fraser. Through November 1907, two attempts were made to target the train carrying the lieutenant governor, which were unsuccessful. However, the group was at last successful on 5 December when Bibhutibhushan sarkar and Prafulla Chaki successfully detonated Dutt's bomb under the Governor's train at Narayangarh, near Midnapore. The Governor escaped unhurt, but security was tightened around him in the investigation that followed. In January 1908, Dutt successfully produced a more powerful picric acid bomb that was tested in Deoghar. Accidentally, a young revolutionary of Rangpur, Prafulla Kumar Chakraborty, died that time. However, by this time Bengal police had infiltrated the Medinapore branch of the Samiti through an infiltrator, who was able to pass on information on the Manisktolla ashram, which he obtained from Satyendranth Bose. This included the names of Barin Ghosh and Aurobindo, and both were soon the subject of surveillance by Calcutta police. However, the Government desisted from acting against Ghosh's group, fearful they would melt away to regroup in secret.

== Muzaffarpur bombings and aftermath ==
=== The plot of killing Kingsford ===
In 1907, Hem Chandra Kanungo (Hem Chandra Das), left Calcutta for Paris to learn the art of bomb-making from Nicholas Safranski, a Russian revolutionary in exile in the French Capital. Returning to Bengal, Hem began working with Barin Ghosh again. With Fraser alerted, a new target was selected: Magistrate Douglas Kingsford. Kingsford was the Chief Magistrate of the Presidency court of Alipore, and had overseen the trials of Bhupendranath Dutta and other editors of Jugantar, sentencing them to rigorous imprisonment. Jugantar itself responded with defiant editorials. The defiance of Jugantar saw it face five more prosecutions that left it in financial ruins by 1908. These prosecutions brought the paper more publicity, and helped disseminate the Samiti's ideology of revolutionary nationalism. Shukla Sanyal notes in 2014 that revolutionary terrorism as an ideology began to win support amongst a significant populace in Bengal, tacitly even if not overt. Kingsford also earned notoriety among nationalists when he ordered the whipping of a young Bengali boy by the name of Sushil Sen for participating in the protests that followed the Jugantar trial. The first attempt to kill Kingsford was in the form of a book bomb that Hem constructed. An empty tin of Cadbury's cocoa was packed with a pound of picric acid and three detonators. This was packed into a hollowed section of Herbert Broom's Commentaries on the Common Law and delivered wrapped in brown paper to Kingsford's house by a young revolutionary named Paresh Mallick. Kingsford placed the unopened package in his shelf to examine it later. By March 1908, fearful of the judge's safety, he was promoted to District Judge and transferred by the government to Muzaffarpur in the northern part of Bihar. With him went his furniture, library and the book bomb made by Hem Chandra.

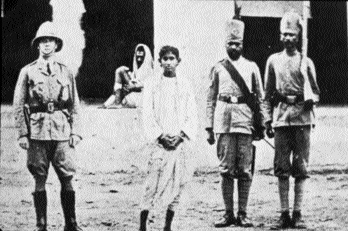
Khudiram Bose, who threw the bomb at Muzaffarpur, held under guard some time after his arrest.

=== The attempt and the failure ===
Anushilan, under Barin, persisted in their attempts to kill Kingsford. In April, a two-man reconnaissance team visited Muzaffarpur, which included Prafulla Chaki. On their return, Hemchandra Kanungo provided the bomb that was to be used, composed of 6 ounces of dynamite, a detonator, and a black powder fuse. Prafulla returned to Muzaffarpur with a new man, Khudiram Bose. However, the outlines of these plans to attempt to take Kingsford's life had also become known to Calcutta police, and commissioner Frederick Loch Halliday had passed on the alert to the Muzaffarpur superintendent of police. Kingsford was thus alerted by the superintendent, but had ignored the warnings. Four men were assigned to guard the magistrate's house. On the evening of 29 April, Bose and Chaki were in place to execute their plans. Pretending to be schoolboys, they surveyed the Muzaffarpur park, opposite The British club frequented by Kingsford. They were noticed by a constable. The next day they returned and, being noticed by the same constable, they scurried away. The duo moved away, then doubled back, hiding in a tree with the bomb. Kingsford was playing bridge that night at the club with his wife and the wife and daughter of a local barrister, Pringle Kennedy. Finishing the last game at 8:30 in the evening, the group broke up to head home. Kingsford and his wife were in a carriage identical to and immediately behind that carrying the Kennedys. As the first carriage passed the tree hiding Chaki and Bose, Bose ran up to the carriage and threw his bomb through the carriage window. Both the occupants were fatally wounded. Escaping in the ensuing confusion, Bose and Chaki broke up and left the town separately. Bose walked through the night, reaching a small town called Waini, from where he intended to take the train back to Calcutta. Unfamiliar with the place, he came under the scrutiny of two constables and was caught while attempting to escape. Chaki, in the meantime, was able to take a different train, but came under the suspicion of an off-duty policeman named Nandalal Bannerjee. Bannerjee telegraphed Calcutta, and upon receiving instructions to detain Chaki, attempted to arrest. Chaki attempted to escape from the platform fighting his way through with his revolver and, down to his last bullet, shot himself in the mouth.

=== Arrest ===
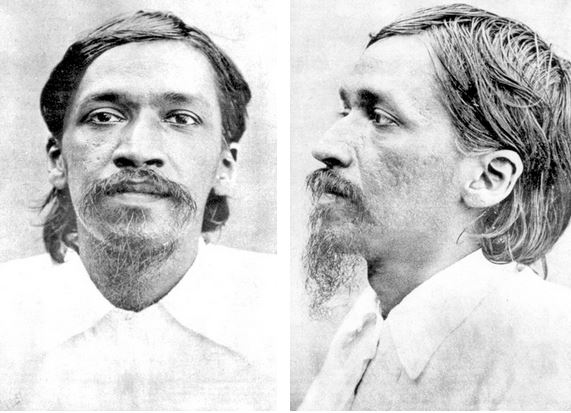
Aurobindo on the day of his arrest on 1 May 1908

News of the bombings reached Calcutta on 1 May 1908, and suspicion was immediately on Aurobindo and Barin. Fraser, the Governor of Bengal, contemplated arrest and deportation of the Samiti leadership of the Ghosh brothers, Abhinash Bhattacharya, Hemchandra Kanungo and Satyendranath Bosu. Fraser feared that the evidence may not be sufficient to obtain conviction in a formal trial. By the time Fraser had wired the Government of India, however, Halliday, unaware of Fraser's actions, begun the process of charging Aurobindo and the Manicktolla group. By 7'o clock in the evening, warrants had been obtained to search eight places in Calcutta and the Manicktolla suburbs, and an operation was put in motion which involved all of Calcutta's police superintendents, nearly twelve inspectors, and more than a hundred constables. A news of the killings broke in the evening newspapers in Calcutta. Barin and his group, warned by Aurobindo, began hiding away arms, ammunition, and bombs in various stages of preparation at the house in Muraripukur lane that served as the headquarters. The place also contained a substantial amount of incriminating papers which the group attempted to burn. On 2 May 1908, police arrested an initial 33 suspects. Aurobindo, Sailen Bose and Abhinash Bhattacharya were arrested from Ghosh's Grey Street office where the trio were staying and his writings and letters were confiscated by the police. They were taken to the police headquarters at Lal Bazar at midday, and then held at the detective headquarters at Royd Street overnight, before being produced in front of Commissioner Halliday the following morning. Meanwhile, seven additional police teams raided properties linked to the Ghosh brothers in North Calcutta, including the residences in Scott Street and in Harrison Road. A search in this second place uncovered large amounts of explosives, bombs, and chemicals left behind by Ullaskar Dutta. Meanwhile, Barin and fourteen others were arrested in a raid at the Maniktala garden premises where they had been staying the night before. A search of the premises led to the discovery large amounts of arms and ammunitions the group had attempted to hide away, while a large amount of incriminating documents and papers that the group had not managed to burn were also seized.

=== Statement by Barin Ghosh ===
Fearing that the entire Samiti organisation stood at jeopardy, Barin offered to make a confessional statement taking responsibility for the conspiracy and the materiel. Convinced that they would be awarded the death penalty in any case, Barin was joined in written statements by Ullashkar Dutt, Indubhushan Roy and Bibhutibhushan Sarkar who implicated themselves taking entire responsibility with written statements, later confirmed orally in front of a magistrate.

== Emperor vs Aurobindo Ghosh and others ==
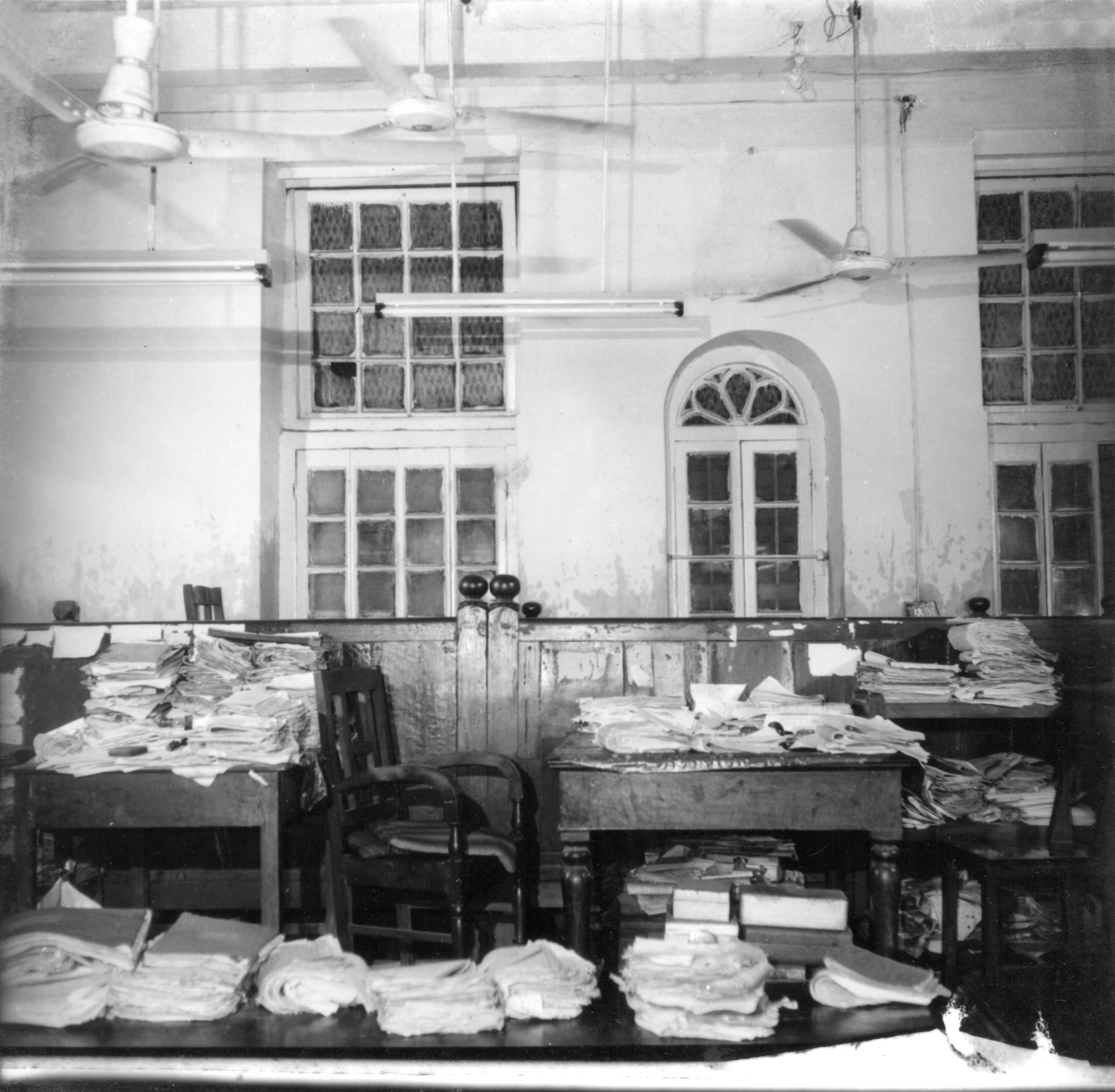
The trial room, Alipore Sessions Court, Calcutta in 1997.

The Maniktala gardens under the jurisdiction of the Alipore suburb of Calcutta. On 5 May 1908, Aurobindo and others were produced in front of the chief presidency magistrate's court, where they were allowed access to lawyers for the first time. From here the case was transferred to the Alipore chief magistrate's court, and the accused were held at Alipore jail, with Aurobindo held in solitary confinement.

=== Initial hearings ===
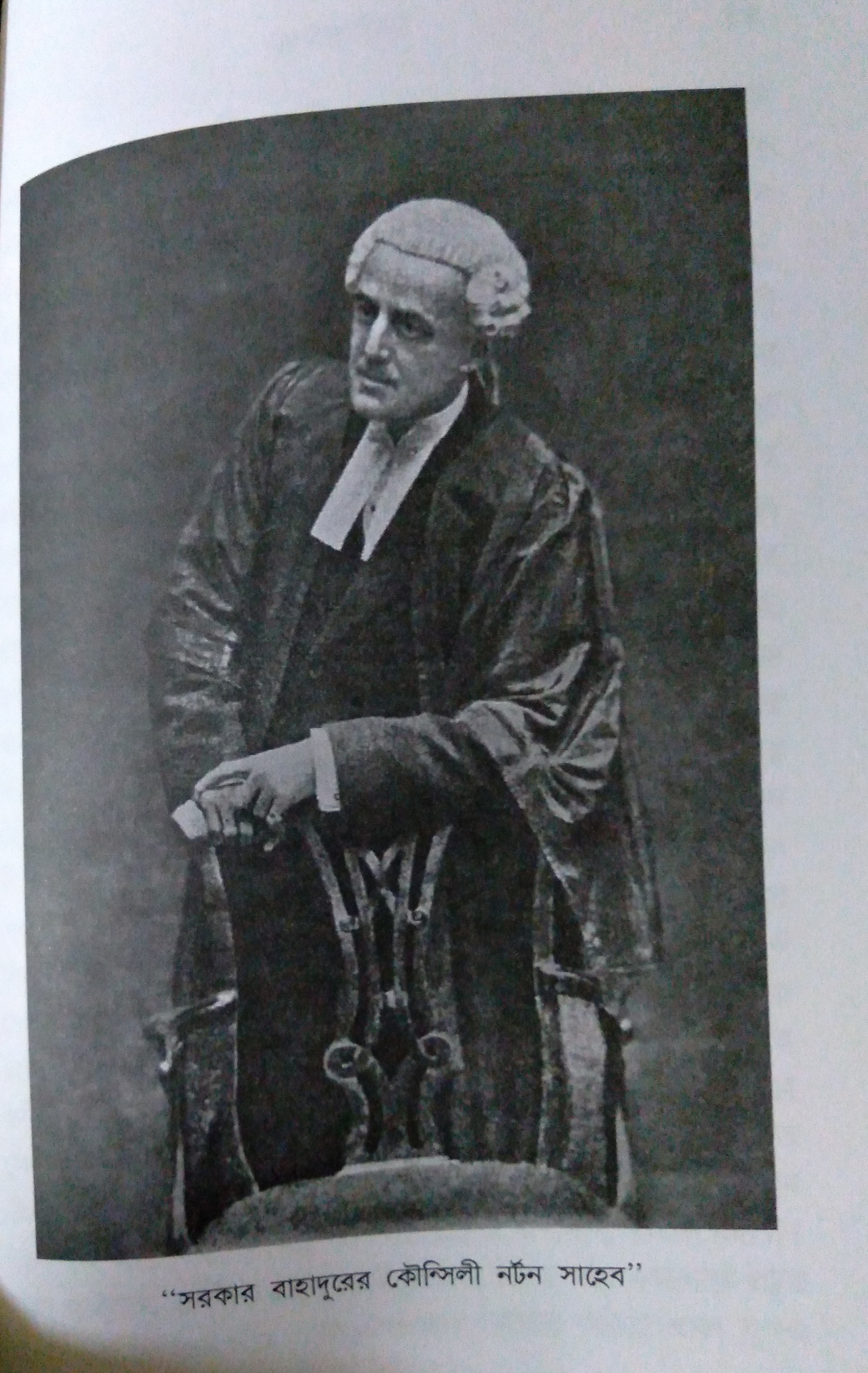
Eardley Norton

On 18 May, the accused were formally charged in the first hearing of Emperor vs Aurobindo Ghosh and others. The charges included "organising to wage war against the government" and charging each individual accused with "waging war against the King". The prosecution was headed by Eardley Norton, a leading barrister of the then presidency of Madras. The hearing was assigned to the court of additional district magistrate, Leonard Birley, ICS. Birley started hearing evidence from the 222 witnesses even before formal charges had been pressed. Nearly 2000 material and documentary exhibits formed the evidence. In total, ultimately 49 stood accused. They were held separately from other prisoners. In the middle of June, the accused were transferred to a three-roomed wing at Alipore Jail, from where they were later moved to Ward 23 of Alipore jail.

The hearings against the accused had continued through May with intermittent recesses. However, despite a considerable body of evidence against most of the accused, very little evidence existed against Aurobindo himself. The structure of Anushilan Samiti prevented the higher echelons of the organisation from becoming familiar to the junior ranks, and Aurobindo's involvement in the organisation and its activities were hard to pinpoint, except for a few letters and correspondences confiscated at Barin's Manicktolla garden house. These included letters Barin had written in 1907, initialled "A.G." proclaiming the time for distributing "sweets" across India, a euphemism for bombs of which the technology Hem Chandra had learnt in Paris. On the other hand, much of the aim of the prosecution was to gain conviction against Aurobindo, who was seen as the most dangerous individual driving the Samiti against the Raj.

=== Murder of Naren Goswami ===
Unable to identify stronger material evidence, the prosecution began an effort to obtain witnesses who may be able to implicate Aurobindo. Their target became a young Anushilanite by the name of Naren Goswami. Goswami belonged to the family of a landowner in Bengal, of a wealthy background and social standing. He had been arrested at Maniktala with Barin and others on the initial raid. On 22 June, Prosecutor Norton announced to the court that Narendranath Goswami had turned "King's witness", or prosecution witness, in return for a pardon. By the middle of August, Birley had heard evidence against the accused. He twice rejected the defence's requests to cross-examine Goswami, using discretionary powers granted to him by the government of Bengal. On 19, 31 August, prisoners were committed to stand trial at Alipore Sessions Court for waging war against the King. On the evidence against Aurobindo, Birley concluded that letters and correspondences from members of the group --- particularly one letter from Barin where he had referred to "distributing sweets" across India --- indicated prima facie involvement on Aurobindo's part.

Kanailal Dutt (2nd from right) and Satyen Basu (4th from right), under arrest after assassinating Naren Goswami.

Interned with his fellow conspirators, Barin Ghosh had carefully planned to stage a jail-break. Careful plans were made to overpower guards with acid, bombs and with arms smuggled into the jail with the help of Samiti members and of family members. By the last week of August, Barin was able to obtain two revolvers, a R.I.C. 0.45 calibre and an Osborne 0.38 calibre revolver. However, the accused soon realised that Goswami knew more than anticipated, and his evidence may implicate many accused including the Ghosh Brothers. A decision was taken by Hemchandra Kanungo to silence Naren. On 29 August, Kanailal Dutt feigned abdominal colic and gained admission to the Jail hospital, from where he sent word to Naren of wishing to turn approver, along with Satyendranath Bosu. Naren, believing the ruse, walked into the Hospital ward to meet the duo with the jail overseer. Armed with the two revolvers somehow smuggled in by Hem Chandra at Barin's request, Sen and Dutta chased Goswami down the jail corridors. The overseer accompanying Goswami, Warden Higgins, attempted to overpower Dutt but was shot through the wrist. Another overseer named Lynton tried to overpower Bose, but the latter broke free. Both Bose and Dutt shot Goswami multiple times, hitting his hip and piercing his spine, wounding him fatally. Bose and Dutta, firing nine shots in total into Goswami's lifeless body, gave themselves up once they realised Goswami was dead. Dutta later pleaded guilty, was convicted and hanged. Bose was initially declared not guilty by jury, but the verdict was returned to the high court, which returned a guilty verdict and awarded him the death sentence.

=== Alipore sessions court ===
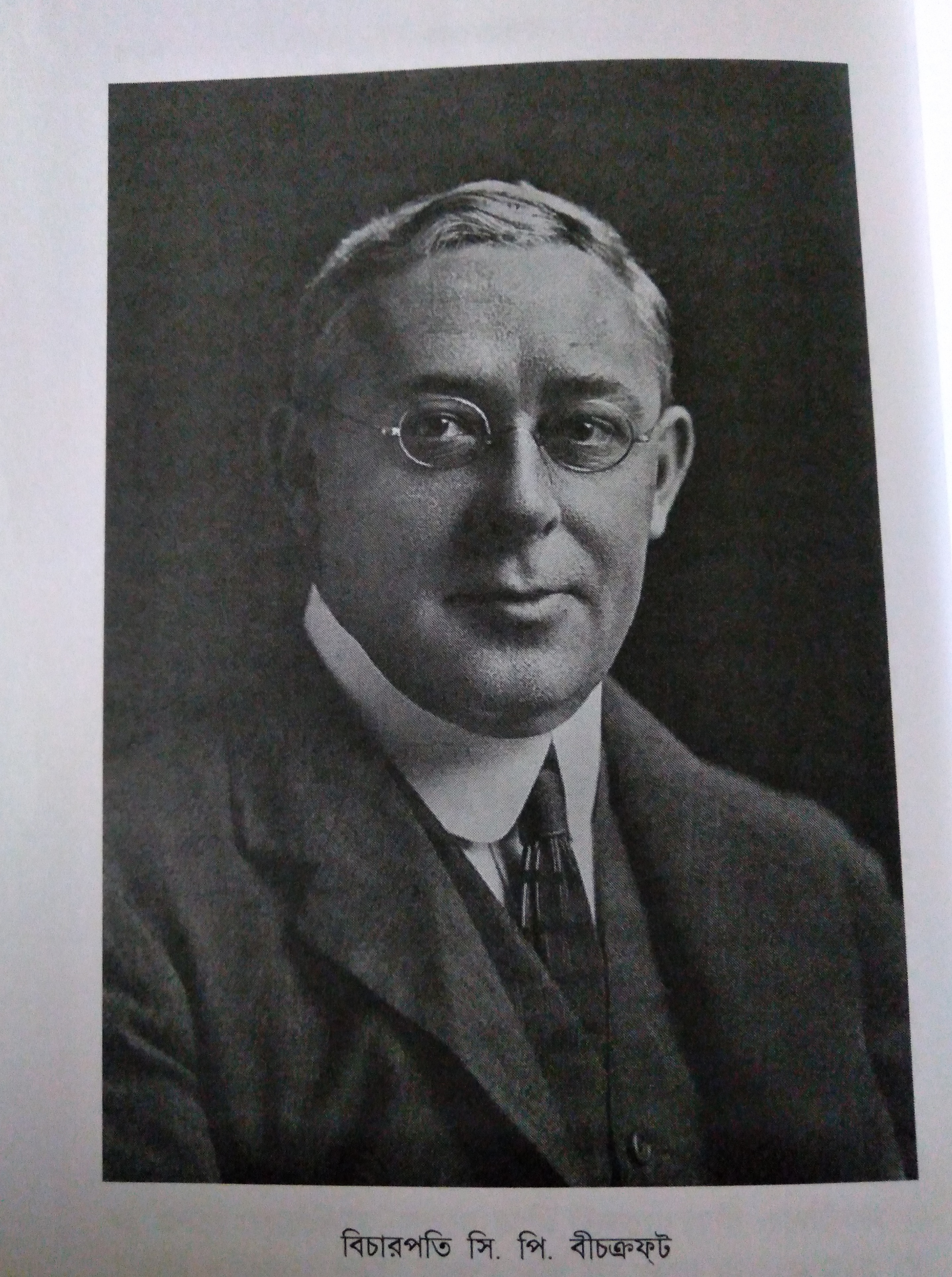
Charles Porten Beachroft

On 19 October 1908, the hearing for the trial began at the court of Charles Porten Beachroft who served as the additional sessions judge of the District 24 Paraganas. Beachcroft and Aurobindo had previously entered the Indian Civil Service Examinations in England in the same year, where Aurobindo had ranked ahead of Beachcroft. The defence team was composed of 15 lawyers, barristers and pleaders. Aurobindo was initially represented by Byomkesh Chakravarty, a leading Calcutta barrister. In addition to the 1500 documents and material evidence, defence team entered further 54 items. However, Chakravarty was successfully able to challenge Norton's attempts to enter Goswami's testimony as evidence, and able to obtain Beachcroft's ruling that Birley broke the law in refusing to allow defence to cross-examine Goswami. The trial continued for a year (1908-1909). In all, 206 witnesses were called, around 400 documents were filed with the court, and more than 5000 exhibits were produced including bombs, revolvers, and acids. However, Chakravarty soon pulled out of Ghosh's defence team, as the funds failed to meet his fees. On the desperate appeal of Ghosh's uncle Krishna Kumar Mitra, the defence was taken over by Chittaranjan Das, then still a junior barrister. Early in the trial, Barin and his fellow detainees from the Manicktolla ashram withdrew their confessions. Despite this, the scope lay to use their evidences against themselves. However, the prosecution's efforts to link Aurobindo to the group and to implicate him as the leader of the conspiracy began to unravel. With assassination of Naren Goswami, precious little remained to link Aurobindo to the works of Barin's group other than his published views in Bande Mataram and Jugantar. Das successfully argued that Aurobindo's thoughts and writings on independence were consistent with philosophical thoughts on liberty and freedom held by the English intelligentsia. On material evidences, Das alleged outright fabrication of documents by the police where these linked Aurobindo to the conspiracy.

Significantly, as the hearings proceeded through 1908 into 1909, the government of Bengal came to fear that Anushilan Samiti would mount a rescue mission to break out the undertrials. A noted rise in militant actions and assassinations linked to Anushilan Samiti in wider Bengal began to be reported, reaching the premises of the Alipore court as the hearings drew to a close. In November 1908, two assassinations were attempted in Calcutta two days apart, one targeting Chief of Police Andrew Fraser and the second where Nandalal Bannerjee --- the police officer who had arrested Prafulla Chaki --- was gunned down, both in public. That same month, a police informant was killed and mutilated in Dacca. A shaken Bengal government arrested and deported a number of Anushilan leaders, including Raja Subodh Mallik, Aurobindo's uncle Krishna Kumar Mitra, and Bande Mataram editor Shyamsunder Chakravarty to Rangoon. In response, in March 1909, Anushilan assassinated public prosecutor Ashutosh Biswas when he was gunned down by Charu Chandra Bose in the very steps of the Alipore High court where the hearings were beginning to draw to a close. The final arguments for prosecution and defence began amidst tight security at the end of March 1909. Das, closing his argument for defense, famously stated:

"My appeal to you is this, that long after the controversy will be hushed in silence, long after this turmoil, the agitation will have ceased, long after he is dead and gone, he will be looked upon as the poet of patriotism, as the prophet of nationalism and the lover of humanity. Long after he is dead and gone, his words will be echoed and re-echoed, not only in India but across distant seas and lands. Therefore, I say that the man in his position is not only standing before the bar of this Court, but before the bar of the High Court of History.
The time has come for you, sir, to consider your judgment and for you, gentlemen, to consider your verdict..."

=== The verdict ===
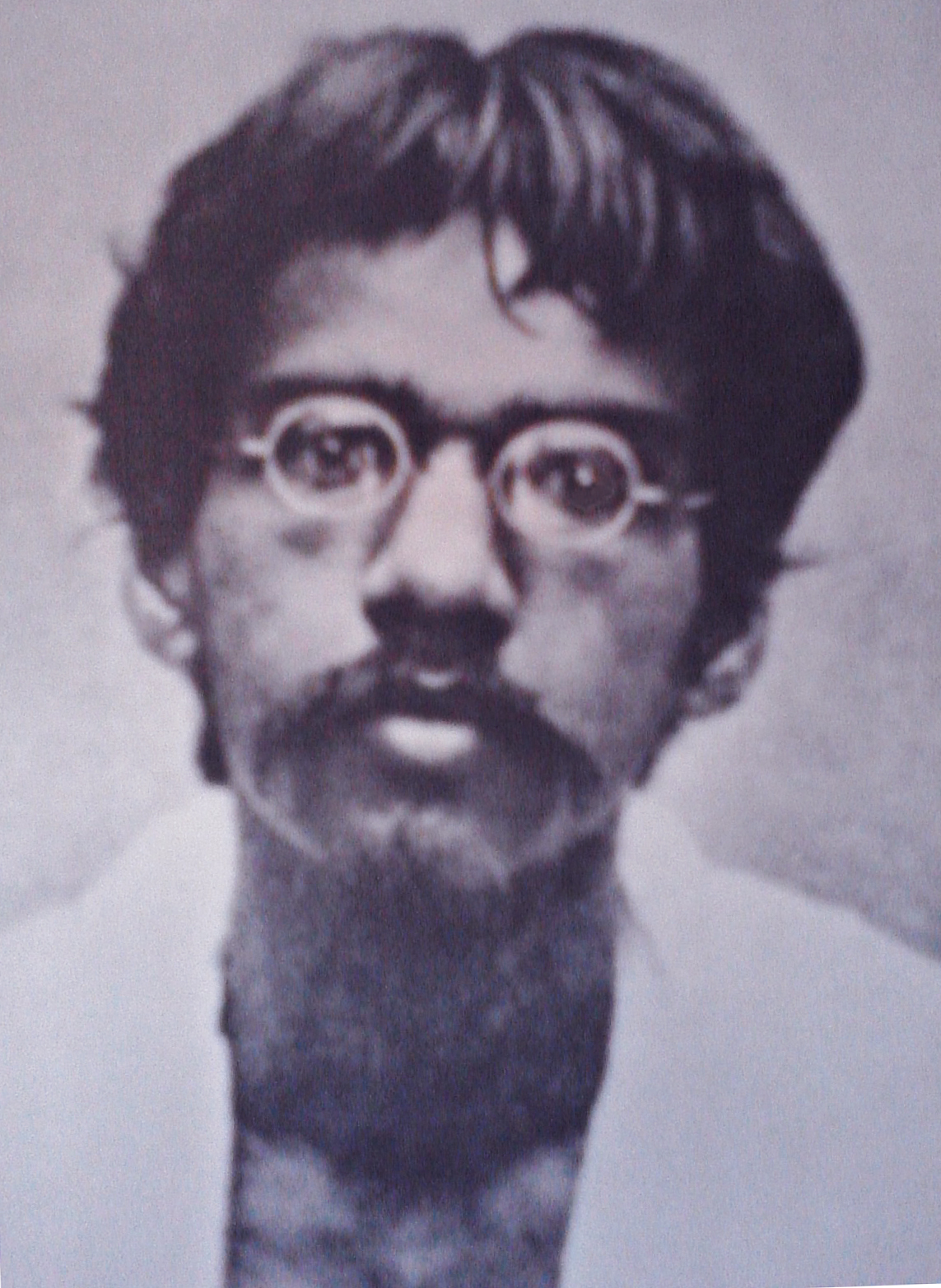
Barindra Kumar Ghosh, sentenced to death, later converted to transportation to Cellular Jail, Andamans

Beachcroft delivered his verdicts on 6 May 1909, amidst tight security in Calcutta to prevent outbreak of nationalist violence. Observing the popular supports following the executions of Khudiram Bose, Kanailal Dutta and Satyen Bose, the day of the verdict was kept closely guarded. Additional security measures were put in place, with a reserve force of European officers held ready in case of an outbreak of violence and disorder in the streets of Calcutta. Sessions Judge Charles Porten Beachcroft delivered his verdicts on 6 May 1909, amidst tight security in Calcutta.

Regarding Sri Aurobindo, he said:

"I now come to the case of Arabinda Ghose, the most important accused in the case. He is the accused, whom more than any other the prosecution are anxious to have convicted and but for his presence in the dock there is no doubt that the case would have been finished long ago. It is partly for that reason that I have left his case till last of all and partly because the case against him depends to a very great extent, in fact almost entirely, upon association with other accused persons... The point is whether his writings & speeches, which in themselves seem to advocate nothing more than the regeneration of his country, taken with the facts proved against him in this case are sufficient to show that he was a member of the conspiracy. And taking all the evidence together I am of opinion that it falls short of such proof as would justify me in finding him guilty of so serious a charge."

In his verdict, Barin Ghosh and Ullaskar Dutt were found guilty, and sentenced to death by hanging (later commuted to life imprisonment). Thirteen others, Upendranath Bandhopadhyay, Bibhuti Bhusan Sarkar, Hrishikesh Kanjilal, Birendra Sen, Sudhir Sarkar, Indra Nundy, Abinash Bhattacharjee, Soilendra Bose, Hemchandra Kanungo, Indu Bhusan Roy, Poresh Mullick, Sishir Ghosh, Nirapado Roy were sentenced to transportation for life and forfeiture of all property. Three others, Poresh Mullick, Sishir Ghosh, Nirapado Roy were sentenced to ten years incarceration along with forfeiture of property. A further three Asoke Nundy, Balkrishna Kane, Susil Sen were sentenced to seven years jail terms. Seventeen, including Aurobindo, were found not guilty. One defendant, Krishna Jiban Sanyal, was sentenced to one-year rigorous imprisonment. Two of the 17 acquitted, Dharaninath Gupta & Nagendranath Gupta, were already undergoing a 7-year sentence for conviction in the Harrison Road case, so they were not released. Probash Chunder Dey was re-arrested on a sedition charge under Section 124A, in connection with the publication of the book "Desh Acharjya". The verdict on Aurobindo was passed last. Beachcroft highlighted the lack of concrete evidence linking Aurobindo to the conspiracy in the lack of crown-witness Naren Goswami.

The verdict was disappointing to the Government of India, who had hoped to obtain a conviction against Aurobindo. Further fears were raised that those acquitted may have already received instructions from Hem on constructing the bombs. Aurobindo further was seen as the most dangerous adversary to the Raj whilst he remained free. Consulted on the prospects of a successful appeal against the verdict on Aurobindo, the advocate general of Bombay the chance of obtaining a conviction "fair", but was unable to provide more reassuring prospects. In August 1909, the government took the decision not to launch an appeal.

Of the two sentenced to death by hanging (but released in 1920), Ullaskar Dutt, a young man of 22, described his occupation as a cow keeper. Barindra Kumar Ghosh, younger brother of Aurobindo Ghosh, was a key player in the Alipore trial. It was in their house that the revolutionaries carried out their activities. Barindra had been born in England and came to India at the age of one. According to British Indian law, he was asked whether he preferred being tried as a British citizen. Barin, as a nationalist, refused. Those two were sentenced to death, with the sentence later commuted to life imprisonment in the Cellular Jail in Andamans, where they remained until a general amnesty, in 1920.

== Popular perception ==
The trial was considered sensational at the time, and generated an enormous amount of interest in both the British and Indian press. In India, journals such as The Empire ran editorials calling for harsh punishments for the undertrials. The Times published a number of reports, reflecting on Aurobindo's career, Aurobindo's monologues and essays, published in Karmayogin, Jugantar, and other publications.

== Impact ==
In the aftermath of the trial, the power of native Indian press in promoting nationalist messages were severely curtailed, with the Indian Press act of 1910 allowing provincial governments to demand punitive deposits from journals deemed hostile to the Raj. Bal Gangadhar Tilak, who had close ties with Aurobindo, was arrested and charged with sedition, subsequently found guilty despite publicly dissociating himself from the Muzaffarpur bombings. In the aftermath of these events, moderates in the Indian National Congress came to be a more prominent force within the organisation, and developed a closer working relationship with the Raj. The Minto-Morley reforms were passed in 1910. Historians like Peter Heehs argue that although these had been planned as early as 1906, the popular impact of the trials hastened, or were perceived to hasten, the passage. In the view of the larger population, the actions of Aurobindo and his group took credit for this.

== Aftermath ==
Aurobindo Ghosh was acquitted of the charges (among 17 acquitted) and came out of the affair with a new outlook on life and spirituality (see final conversion). He recused himself from active politics, ultimately settling to his ashram in Pondicherry. Barin was interred till 1920, and after being released from jail he worked as a journalist, including The Statesman. He died in 1959. Aurobindo retired from active politics after he was acquitted. This was followed by a 1909 Dhaka conspiracy case, which brought 44 members of the Dhaka Anushilan to trial.

In the aftermath of the Manicktala conspiracy, the western Anushilan Samiti found a more-prominent leader in Bagha Jatin and emerged as the Jugantar. Jatin revitalised links between the central organisation in Calcutta and its branches in Bengal, Bihar, Orissa and Uttar Pradesh, establishing hideouts in the Sunderbans for members who had gone underground. The group slowly reorganised, aided by Amarendra Chatterjee, Naren Bhattacharya and other younger leaders. Some of its younger members, including Taraknath Das, left India. Between 1909 and 1914, the group continued its campaign against the interests, making a number of attempts on the lives of Raj officials with variable successes. In a concerted attempt of revenge, Ashutosh Biswas, an advocate of Calcutta High Court in charge of the prosecution of the Narendranath Goswami murder case, was shot dead within Calcutta High Court in 1909. In 1910, Shamsul Alam, Deputy Superintendent of Bengal Police responsible for investigating the Alipore Bomb case, was shot dead on the steps of Calcutta High Court. Naren Bannerjee, the police officer who arrested Khudiram Bose, was murdered in 1910. These assassinations led up to the uncovering of Jatin's network, precipitating the Howrah-Sibpur Conspiracy case. Undeterred, the Samiti's networks continued the attempts on political violence and assassinations, using its base in Chandernagore. The most notable was the attempt on the life of Viceroy of India in 1912 in a conspiracy headed by Rash Behari Bose. However, the most serious threat organised by the Samiti arose in 1914 when, with the clouds of war gathering in Europe in 1914, the Samiti began liaising with revolutionary groups abroad and with Imperial Germany to overthrow the British Raj with a Pan-Indian Mutiny.

== Memoirs and other publications ==
Several convicts of Maniktala Bomb Case wrote memoirs after their release from British captivity. Following is a brief list:

- Bandyopadhyay, Upendranath (1921). নির্বাসিতের আত্মকথা, Calcutta: Hrishikesh Kanjilal.
- Ghosh, Barindra Kumar (1922). The Tale of My Exile, Pondicherry: Arya Office.
- Ghosh, Barindra Kumar (1922). বারীন্দ্রের আত্মকাহিনী, Calcutta: D.M. Library.
- Datta, Ullaskar (1923). কারাজীবনী, Calcutta: Arya Publishing House.
- Datta, Ullaskar (1924). Twelve Years of Prison Life, Pondicherry: Arya Office.

== Commemoration ==
- The site of Barin Ghosh's country residence – the site of arrest of fourteen nationalists who stood trial – is commemorated by a marble plaque unveiled in 1990 by the West Bengal state government in independent India.
- 48 Grey Street, where Aurobindo was arrested with three others, was also commemorated with a marble plaque from the government in 1993. Grey street was renamed Aurobindo Sarani by West Bengal Government in independent India.
- Pusa road railway station, where Khudiram Bose was arrested, is now named after him.
- Kanailal Dutt is commemorated with a bust at his birth town of Chanderrnagore.
- The Osborne 0.38 calibre revolver used in Naren Goswami's assassination forms a part of collections of Police Museum at Kolkata.
