= Khudiram Bose =

Indian revolutionary, freedom fighter and martyr (1889–1908)

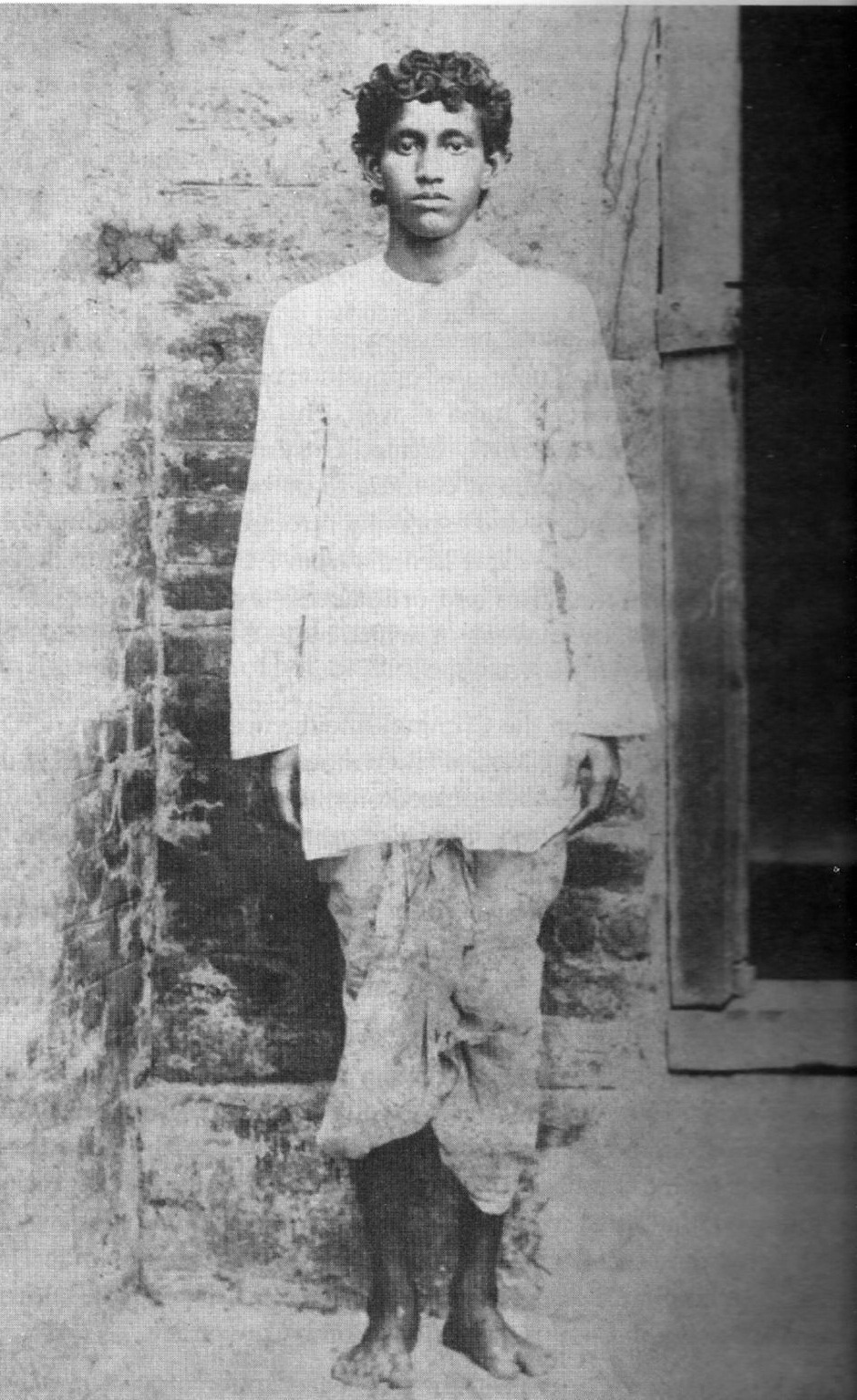
- Bose c. 1905
- Born: 3 December 1889; Habibpur, Midnapore, Bengal Presidency, British India (now Paschim Medinipur, West Bengal, India)
- Died: 11 August 1908 (aged 18); Muzaffarpur, Bengal Presidency, British India (now Bihar, India)
- Occupation: Indian Freedom fighter
- Organisation: Jugantar
- Known for: Role in Indian freedom struggle
- Movement: Indian independence movement
- Criminal status: Executed by hanging

Khudiram Bose (Note: also spelled Khudiram Basu) (3 December 1889 – 11 August 1908) was an Indian nationalist from Bengal Presidency who opposed British rule of India. For his role in the Muzaffarpur Conspiracy Case, along with Prafulla Chaki, he was sentenced to death, for the attempted assassination of a British judge, Magistrate Douglas Kingsford, by throwing bombs on the carriage they suspected belonged to him. Magistrate Kingsford, however, was seated in a different carriage, and the throwing of the bombs resulted in the deaths of two British women instead. Prafulla committed suicide by shooting himself before arrest. Khudiram was later arrested and tried for the murder of the two women, ultimately being sentenced to death. He was one of the first Indian revolutionaries in Bengal to be executed by the British.

Mahatma Gandhi, however, denounced the violence, lamenting the deaths of the two innocent women. He stated "that the Indian people will not win their freedom through these methods." Bal Gangadhar Tilak, in his newspaper Kesari, defended the two young men and called for immediate swaraj. This was followed by the immediate arrest of Tilak by the British colonial government on charges of sedition.

== Early life ==
Khudiram Bose hailed from a Bengali Kayastha family of Habibpur, Midnapore, Paschim Medinipur in Bengal Presidency (now West Bengal). His father held the post of Tehsildar in Midnapore Town of West Medinipur district.

Khudiram was the fourth child in a family of three daughters. His parents, Trailokyanath Bose and Lakshmipriya Devi had two sons before the birth of Khudiram but both of them died in infancy. Following the traditional customs prevalent in the culture, the newborn child was symbolically sold to his eldest sister in exchange for three handfuls of food grains locally known as Khud, in an attempt to save him from dying at an early age. This way he acquired the name, Khudiram.

He lost his mother when he was five years old. His father died a year later. Aparupa Roy, his elder sister, brought him to her house at Hatgacha village under the Daspur Police Station. Aparupa's husband, Amritalal Roy, got him admitted to Tamluk's Hamilton High School.

In 1902 and 1903, Sri Aurobindo and Sister Nivedita visited Medinipur. They held a series of public lectures and private sessions with the existing revolutionary groups for freedom. Khudiram, a teenager, was an active participant in the discussions about the revolution, he met the veteran revolutionary Hemchandra Kanungo, who was the chief of the Anushilan Samiti at Medinipur.

Apparently, he was recruited to the Anushilan Samiti, by Hemchandra Kanungo and came into contact with the network of Barindra Kumar Ghosh of Calcutta. He became a volunteer at the age of 15, and was arrested in Medinipur for distributing pamphlets against the British rule in India, but he was completely acquitted of the charges due to the effective pleading by Barrister Birendranath Sasmal. At the young age of 16, Khudiram took part in planting bombs near the police stations and targeted government officials.

== Kingsford assassination attempts ==
=== First attempt ===
The first attempt to kill Kingsford was in the form of a book bomb constructed by Hemchandra Kanungo, a revolutionary, who learnt bomb making techniques from Europe. An empty tin of Cadbury cocoa was packed with a pound of picric acid and three detonators. This was packed into a hollowed section of Herbert Broom's Commentaries on the Common Law and delivered wrapped in a brown paper to Kingsford's house by Paresh Mallick, a young revolutionary. Kingsford placed the unopened package in his shelf to examine later. By March 1908, fearful of the judge's safety, he was promoted to the District Judge position and transferred by the government to Muzaffarpur, Bihar. With him went his furniture, library and the book bomb.

=== Reconnaissance at Muzaffarpur ===
Anushilan Samiti persisted in their attempt to kill Kingsford. In April, a two-man reconnaissance team visited Muzaffarpur, which included Prafulla Chaki. On their return, Hemchandra provided the bomb, which was composed of 6 ounces of dynamite, a detonator, and a black powder fuse. Prafulla Chaki returned to Muzaffarpur with a new boy, Khudiram Bose.

=== Police suspicion ===
The activities of Aurobindo Ghosh, Barindra Ghosh and their associates roused suspicion. The Calcutta police became aware of the plans on Kingsford's life. Commissioner F.L. Halliday's alerts to the Superintendent of Police in Muzaffarpur were ignored. However, four men were assigned to guard the magistrate's house. In the meantime, Khudiram Bose and Prafulla Chaki adopted the name of Haren Sarkar and Dinesh Chandra Roy respectively and took up residence in a charitable inn (Dharamshala) run by Kishorimohan Bandyopadhyay. In the ensuing days, the duo monitored the activities and daily routine of their target. The two revolutionaries successfully hid their identities for over three weeks. The CID officer from Calcutta returned with a letter from the Superintendent of Muzaffarpur, Armstrong, that the duo had not arrived.

On the evening of 29 April, Khudiram and Prafulla were in place to execute their plans. Pretending to be schoolboys, they surveyed the Muzaffarpur park situated opposite The British Club, frequented by Kingsford. They were noticed by a constable.

=== Assassination attempts at Muzaffarpur ===
Kingsford and his wife were playing bridge with the daughter and wife of Pringle Kennedy, a British barrister. They decided to head home around 8.30 PM. Kingsford and his wife were in a carriage identical to the one carrying Kennedy and his family As their carriage reached the eastern gate of the compound of the European Club, Khudiram and Prafulla ran towards the carriage and threw the bombs into the carriage. A loud explosion ensued and the carriage was taken to Kingsford's house. The carriage was shattered and the Kennedy ladies sustained terrible injuries. Miss Kennedy died within an hour and Mrs. Kennedy died on 2 May of sustained injuries.

=== Escape ===
Khudiram and Prafulla went their own way to escape capture. By morning, Khudiram had walked 25 miles and he reached a station called Waini. As he asked for a glass of water at a tea stall, he was confronted by two armed constables, Fateh Singh, and Sheo Pershad Singh, who immediately suspected something upon seeing his dusty feet, and his exhausted and perspiring appearance. After a couple of questions, their suspicion became stronger, and they decided to detain Khudiram. Khudiram started struggling with the two men, and immediately, one of the two hidden revolvers fell out. Before Khudiram could use the other one to fire on the constables, one of them held him from behind in a bear-hug. The much younger and lightly built Khudiram had no more chance of defence or escape. On his person were found 37 rounds of ammunition, Rs. 30 in cash, a railway map and a page of the rail timetable. The fate of Khudiram was sealed forever. The Waini station is now known as Khudiram Bose Pusa Station.

On the other hand, Prafulla had travelled long arduous hours. Around midday, a civil named Trigunacharan Ghosh noticed a young man coming his way. He was aware of the bomb blast and realised that Prafulla was the other revolutionary. Ghosh decided to save his life, and let him bathe, eat, and rest in his house. He arranged for Prafulla to return to Kolkata the same night. He boarded a train from Samastipur for Mokamaghat, and continue his onward journey with a train to Howrah. A sub-inspector in the Indian Imperial Police, Nandalal Bannerjee, was travelling in the same compartment. He struck a conversation and realised Prafulla to be the other revolutionary. When Prafulla got down at the Shipwright station to drink water, Bannerjee sent a telegram to the Muzaffarpur police station. Banerjee tried to apprehend Prafulla at the Mokamaghat station. Prafulla tried to fight his way through with his revolver but in the end, down to his last bullet, he shot himself in the mouth.

On 1 May, the handcuffed Khudiram was brought from to Muzaffarpur. The entire town descended at the police station to take a look at the teenage boy surrounded by a team of armed policemen. Khudiram was taken to the house of the district magistrate, Mr. Woodman. The English daily, The Statesman, wrote on the following day, 2 May 1908:

The Railway station was crowded to see the boy. A mere boy of 18 or 19 years old, who looked quite determined. He came out of a first-class compartment and walked all the way to the phaeton, kept for him outside, like a cheerful boy who knows no anxiety.....on taking his seat the boy cheerfully cried 'Vandemataram'.

Khudiram had to give a statement or declaration to the magistrate. He took full responsibility for the assassination, unknown that Prafulla was dead. Only after Khudiram finished giving his statement, the body of Prafulla reached Muzaffarpur. Khudiram realised that lying would go in vain. He identified the body of Prafulla and the British also received details from the encounter with sub-inspector Bannerjee. Instead of believing Khudiram, the British colonial authorities thought it more proper to detach Prafulla's head from his corpse and send it to Calcutta for better confirmation.

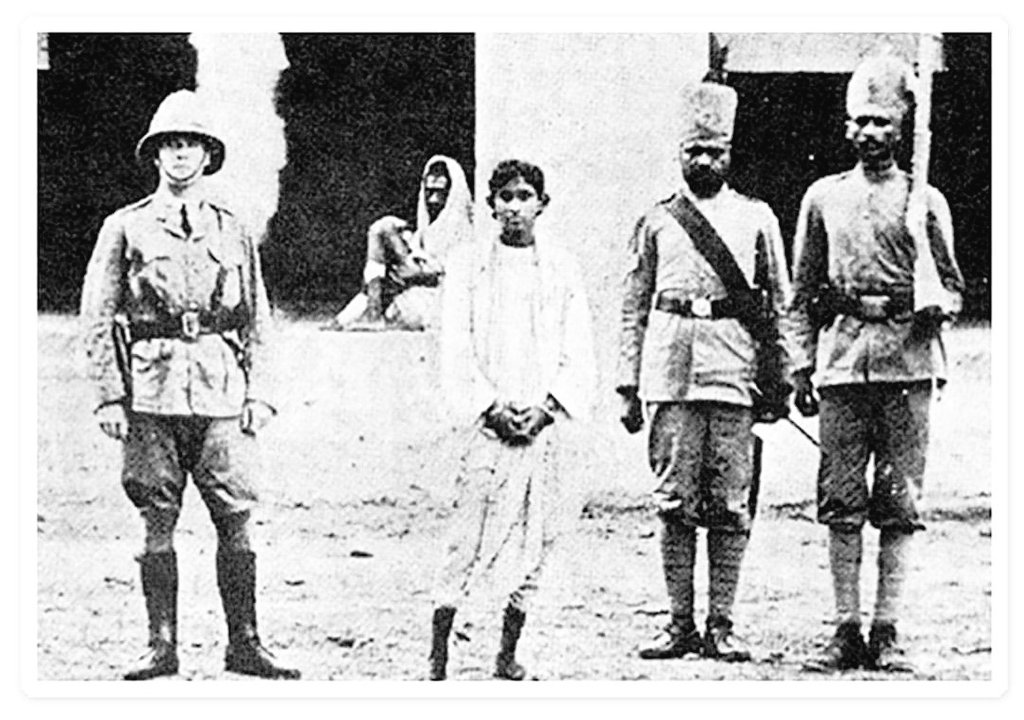
Khudiram Bose as a captive

== First hearing ==
The historical trial started on 21 May 1908, presided by Judge Corndoff, Nathuni Prasad and Janak Prasad in the Jury. Along with Khudiram, two others were tried for assisting the revolutionaries in their mission — Mrityunjay Chakraborty and Kishorimohan Bandopadhyay, who had accommodated Khudiram Bose and Prafulla Chaki in his Dharmashala for their mission. Mrityunjay died during the trial, and subsequently, the trial of Kishorimohan was separated from that of Khudiram.

Mannum and Binod Bihari Majumdar were the prosecutors for the British colonial government. Lawyers Kalidas Basu, Upendranath Sen, and Kshetranath Bandopadhyay took up Khudiram's defence. They were joined later in the trial by Kulkamal Sen, Nagendra Lal Lahiri, and Satischandra Chakraborty—all of them fought the case without any fees.

On 23 May, Khudiram resubmitted his statement to magistrate E.W. Bredhowd, denying any involvement or responsibility in any aspect or stage of the entire mission and operation down to the bombing. Initially, Khudiram was not ready to sign this statement but did so after persuasion from his lawyers. On 13 June, the scheduled date for the verdict and sentence, the judge and the prosecutors received an anonymous letter of warning, which told them that there was one more bomb coming for them from Kolkata and that henceforth. it will be the Biharis, and not the Bengalis, who are going to kill them. On the other hand, it made the defence lawyers more confident as the letter was proof there could be other masterminds and executors of the Muzaffarpur bombing other than Khudiram, and that along with Khudiram's age should make the judge deliver sentencing other than death. But, to the disappointment to all, the Judge pronounced the death sentence for Khudiram.

Khudiram's immediate and spontaneous response was to smile. The judge, surprised, asked Khudiram whether he had understood the meaning of the pronounced sentence. Khudiram replied that he surely had. When the judge asked him again whether he had anything to say, in front of a packed audience, Khudiram replied with the same smile that if he could be given some time, he could teach the judge the skill of bomb-making. By then, the Judge was instructing the police to escort the boy out of the courtroom.

As per the legal system, Khudiram had 7 days to appeal to the High Court. Khudiram refused to appeal. However, after some persuasion by his counselors — with the logic that if he receives a life sentence instead of getting hanged because of this appeal, he would live to serve his nation once free and he would have age on his side when that happens — Khudiram finally agreed, in a detached manner, to go along with his defence team.

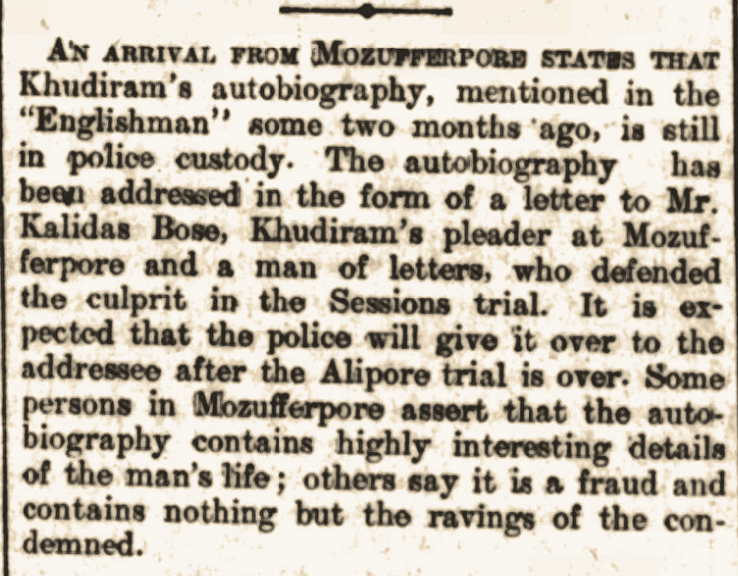
News report on Khudiram Bose

== Second hearing ==
The High Court hearing took place on 8 July 1908. Narendrakumar Basu came to Khudiram's defence and concentrated all his legal skills and experience in this case to save a boy who had overnight become a wonder and a hero for the whole country. He challenged the verdict of the session court by saying that the judging was not according to law and was flawed. He reasoned that according to article 164 of the penal code, the accused is required to submit his statement in front of a first class magistrate, which Mr. Woodman was not, and moreover, during the first statement Khudiram was not told anything of the person's identity and position.

Secondly, pointed out Basu, the article 364 requires that all questions to the accused be made in the mother tongue of the same, and all answers from the accused in his mother tongue be documented verbatim in that language, but which was done in English in Khudiram's case. Moreover, Khudiram's signature was required to be given on the statement on the same date and at the time of the statement in the presence of the magistrate, but in reality, Khudiram was made to sign the day after, and in front of a different person, who was an additional magistrate. Lastly, since such a statement is by definition required to be totally voluntary, with the magistrate being sure that it was so, there was no proof that Khudiram was allowed to give a voluntary statement without any direct or indirect manipulation after his capture.

Lastly, Narendrakumar Basu said that Prafulla aka "Dinesh" (the name used in the trial) was stronger than Khudiram was, and he was the bomb-expert among the two of them. Thus, it is highly likely that the actual thrower of the bomb was "Dinesh". Further, Prafulla's suicide on the verge of capture only reinforces the possibility of his being the actual thrower of the bombs.

After the defence, it was announced by the two British judges that the final verdict would be passed on 13 July 1908.

== Judgement ==
As Khudiram was the only of the two alive, his lone statement of a two-man team was the foundation for the entire case. Since all the legal arguments put forth by Narendrakumar Basu were believed to be technically correct, it was hoped that for the sake of the law—about which the British prided themselves ad infinitum — Khudiram's life would, at least, be spared. But, on a historical day, the British judges confirmed the conviction and sentence and dismissed the appeal.

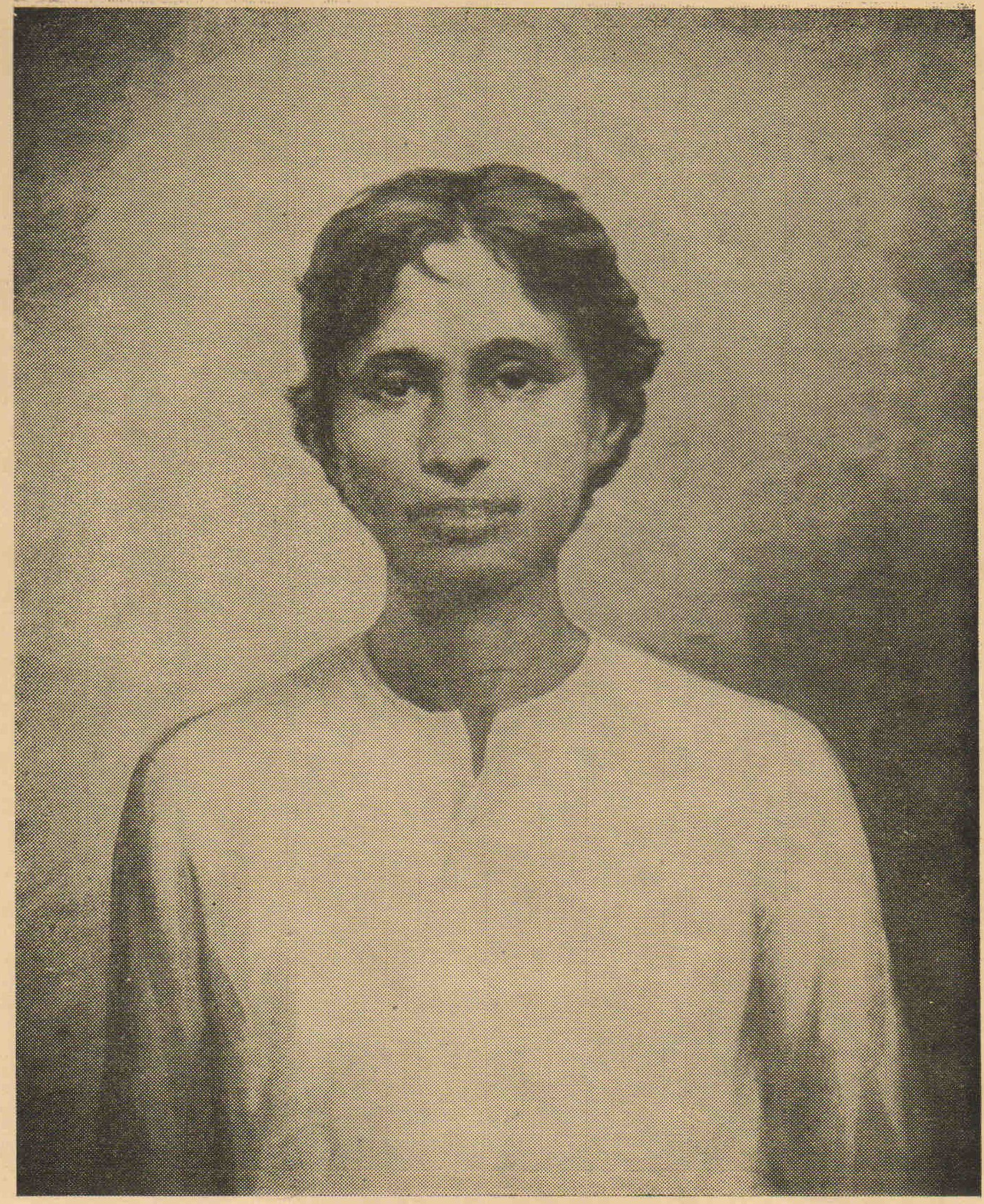
Painting of Khudiram Bose by Haripada Das it is kept at Mahajati Sadan, Kolkata

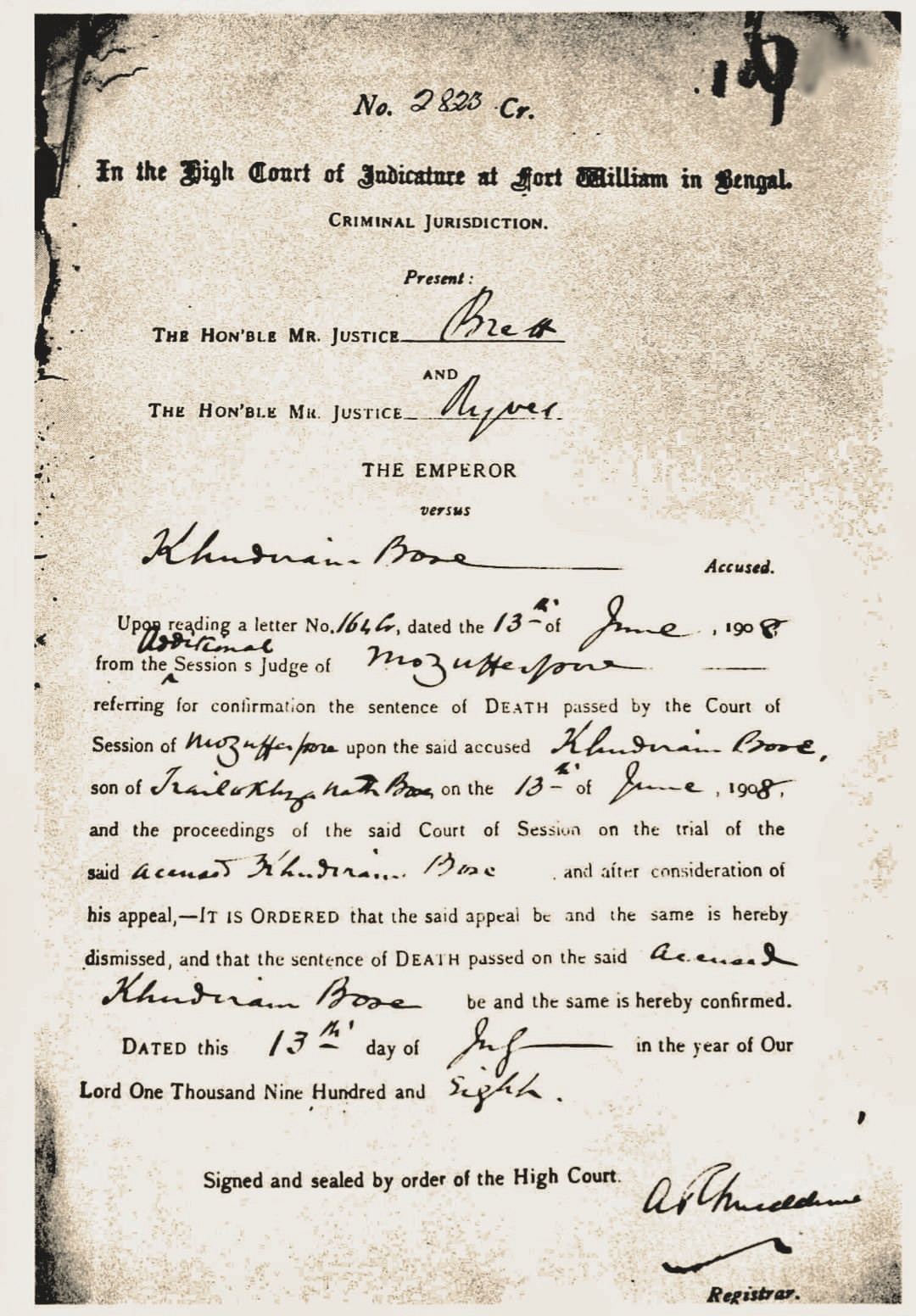
Death Sentence of Khudiram Bose

== Execution ==
On 11 August, the region around the prison became packed with a swelling crowd before the scheduled time, 6 AM. People holding flower garlands filled up the front rows of the crowd. Upendranath Sen, the lawyer-journalist of the Bengali news daily "Bengalee", who was close to Khudiram, reports having reached the venue by 5 AM, in a car with all the necessary funerary arrangements and clothes. After the hanging, the funeral procession went through the city, with police guards holding back the crowd all along the central artery street. The people kept throwing their flowers on the body as the carriage passed by.

The Amrita Bazar Patrika, one of the prominent dailies of that era, carried the story of the hanging the next day, on 12 August. Under the headline "Khudiram's End: Died cheerful and smiling" the newspaper wrote:

"Khudiram's execution took place at 6 a.m. this morning. He walked to the gallows firmly and cheerfully and even smiled when the cap was drawn over his head."

An established Anglo-Indian newspaper, The Empire, wrote:

"Khudiram Bose was executed this morning...It is alleged that he mounted the scaffold with his body erect. He was cheerful and smiling."

The Kesari, nationalist Marathi newspaper, observed on 26 May 1908:

"Neither the Jubilee murder of 1897, nor the reported tampering of the Sikh regiments had produced so much commotion, and the English public opinion seems inclined to regard birth of the bomb in India as the most extraordinary event since the mutiny at 1857."

The Bengali poet Kazi Nazrul Islam wrote a poem to honour him.

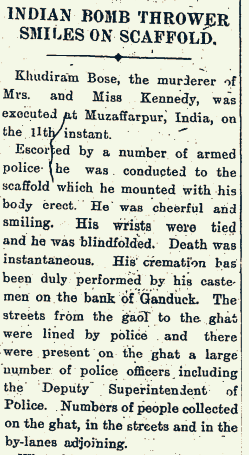
News report of Khudiram Bose's death in English.

After martyrdom, Khudiram became so popular that weavers of Bengal started weaving a special type of dhoti, with 'Khudiram' written on its side. Boys studying in school colleges wore these dhotis and stitched and walked on the path of independence.

== Statement made by Khudiram Bose ==
In his own words, Khudiram made a statement (which was updated) while under arrest, recorded by the special branch of the police, before he was hanged: "I was naughty in my childhood, But after I entered Midnapore Collegiate School a change overtook me".

== Legacy ==
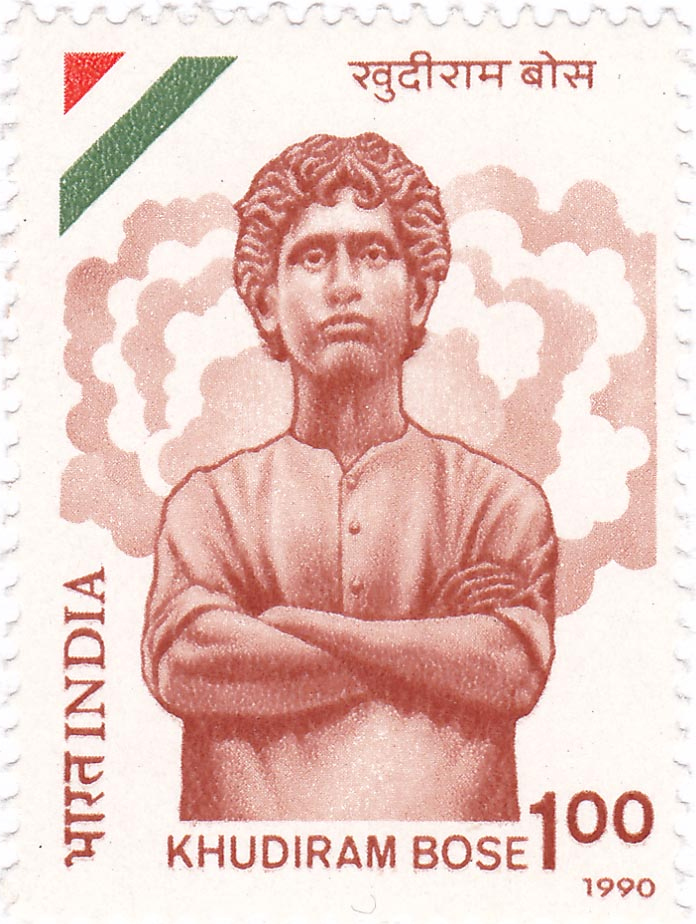
Khudiram Bose 1990 stamp of India

- Shahid Khudiram Station – a metro railway station near Garia in Kolkata.
- Shahid Khudiram Bose Hospital – a hospital on BT Road near Municipality park.
- Khudiram Bose Memorial Central Jail – the Muzaffarpur Jail, where the freedom fighter was incarcerated and hanged on 11 August 1908, was renamed.
- Sahid Khudiram Siksha Prangan – a university campus for postgraduate studies of University of Calcutta, Kolkata. It is also known as Alipore Campus.
- Khudiram Anushilan Kendra – located adjacent to the Netaji Subhash Chandra Bose Indoor Stadium in Kolkata.
- Khudiram Bose Pusa railway station

== Films ==
Over the years, Khudiram Bose and his journey have been represented in several films.

- Biplabi Kshudiram (1951 film)
- Main Khudiram Bose Hun (2017 film)
- Khudiram Bose (2022 film)

== See also ==
- Indian independence movement
- Revolutionary movement for Indian independence
- Anushilan Samiti
- Prafulla Chaki
