= Dainik Basumati =

Dainik Basumati was a Bengali daily published from Kolkata by the Basumati Corporation Limited. It was first published on 6 August 1914 and stopped its publication in 2003.

== History ==
In 1881, Upendranath Mukhopadhyay started the Basumati Sahitya Mandir with the blessings of Sri Ramakrishna Paramahamsa as a publishing house in Beadon Street. Later he shifted his workplace to Grey Street and finally to the present location at Bowbazar Street. In 1895, inspired by Vivekananda Mukhopadhyaya started publishing Weekly Basumati, a digest of the news from all over the world. On 6 August 1914, the Dainik Basumati began. In 1941, the Bengal government cracked down on the daily as it played major role of patriotic thought against the Government. The publication of Dainik Basumati was stopped and Basumati Telegram was launched.

In 1961, the Basumati Sahitya Mandir ran into internal problems. It was acquired by Ashoke Kumar Sen, the then Union Law Minister in 1962. In 1970, the publication of Dainik Basumati was suspended and the Basumati Corporation Limited closed down. In 1971 it reopened again. Four years later in 1974, the publication house was acquired by the Government of West Bengal. In September 1992, the Basumati stopped its operations in Kolkata and moved to Siliguri. In 2003, the Dainik Basumati stopped its publication.

== Editors ==
Dainik Basumati, one of the oldest Bengali Daily papers, was edited by Barindra Kumar Ghosh, younger brother of Sri Aurobindo Ghosh.
