= Pringle Kennedy =

British author and barrister

Pringle Kennedy (1855 – 16 February 1925) was a British author and barrister. He is best known for writing two books (during 1905–1925):

- A History of the Great Moghuls (Or A History of the Badshahate of Delhi From 1398 AD To 1739), in 2 volumes, during 1905–1911.
- Arabian Society at the Time of Muhammad, published in 1926 by Thacker, Spink & Co. (Calcutta, India).

Pringle Kennedy observed in Arabian Society at the Time of Muhammad (pp. 8–10, 18-21): "Muhammad was, to use a striking expression, the man of the hour."

In 1908, 18-year-old Bengali revolutionary Khudiram Bose, was hanged for throwing a bomb at the carriage of Pringle Kennedy and killing his wife and daughter, Grace Kennedy. Bose and his companion Prafulla Chaki had intended to assassinate a British judge, Presidency Magistrate Douglas Hollinshead Kingsford. However, Kingsford was seated in a different carriage.

Prafulla fatally shot himself before he could be arrested arrest. Khudiram was arrested, tried for the murder of the two women and sentenced to death. He was one of the first Indian revolutionaries in Bengal to be executed by the British.

Pringle Kennedy died on 16 February 1925.
