= Vivekananda Mukhopadhyaya =

Indian Bengali journalist (1904–1993)

Vivekananda Mukhopadhyay
- Born: 31 July 1904; Madaripur, Faridpur District, Bengal, British India
- Died: 20 March 1993 (aged 88); Kolkata, West Bengal, India
- Resting place: Kolkata
- Occupations: Journalist, Writer
- Known for: Writings in Bengali literature
- Spouse: Geeta Mukhopadhyay
- Children: Esha Dey; Bhaskarananda Mukhopadhyay; Ela Mukhopadhyay
- Parent(s): Kuladananda Mukhopadhyay (father); Manomohini Debi (mother)
- Awards: 1970 Padma Bhushan; Soviet Land Nehru Award (1st class)

Vibekananda Mukhopadhyay (Bengali: বিবেকানন্দ মুখোপাধ্যায়) was an Indian Bengali journalist and author. He is best known for Dwitiya Mahajuddher Itihas (দ্বিতীয় মহাযুদ্ধের ইতিহাস,) a three volume book Indian view of World War II. As an activist, he was deeply involved in all the national and international movements of his time. The Government of India awarded him Padma Bhushan, the third highest Indian civilian award, in 1970.

== Early life ==
Mukhopadhayay was born in an impoverished Bengali Hindu family to Kuldananda Mukhopadhyay and Manomohini Devi in the Domsar village of Madaripur sub-division of Faridpur district of undivided Bengal in 1904. His ancestral home was in Chhoygaon village in Madaripur sub-division which was lost due to erosion of the Padma. In his childhood, he was a bright and meritorious student. As he came from a needy family, he received the local landlord's customary patronage to continue his studies. In 1921, the wave of Non-Cooperation Movement reached Faridpur district and Mukhopadhyay's studies got disrupted. However in 1923 he passed the Matriculation examination with distinctions in Bengali and Sanskrit. He couldn't continue his studies because of the financial constraints caused by the demise of elders in the family.

== Career ==
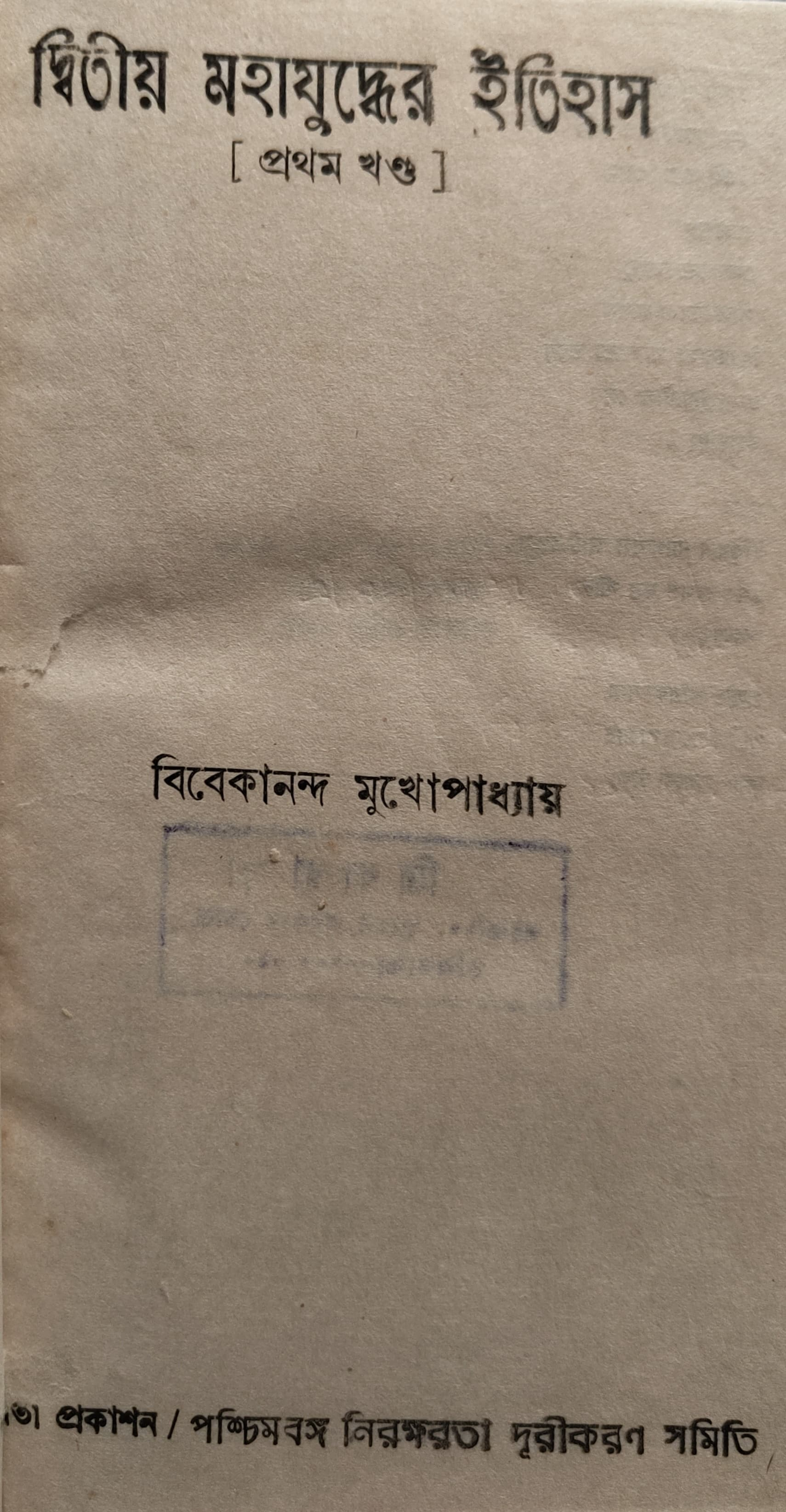
Dwitiya Mahajuddher Itihas, Part 1

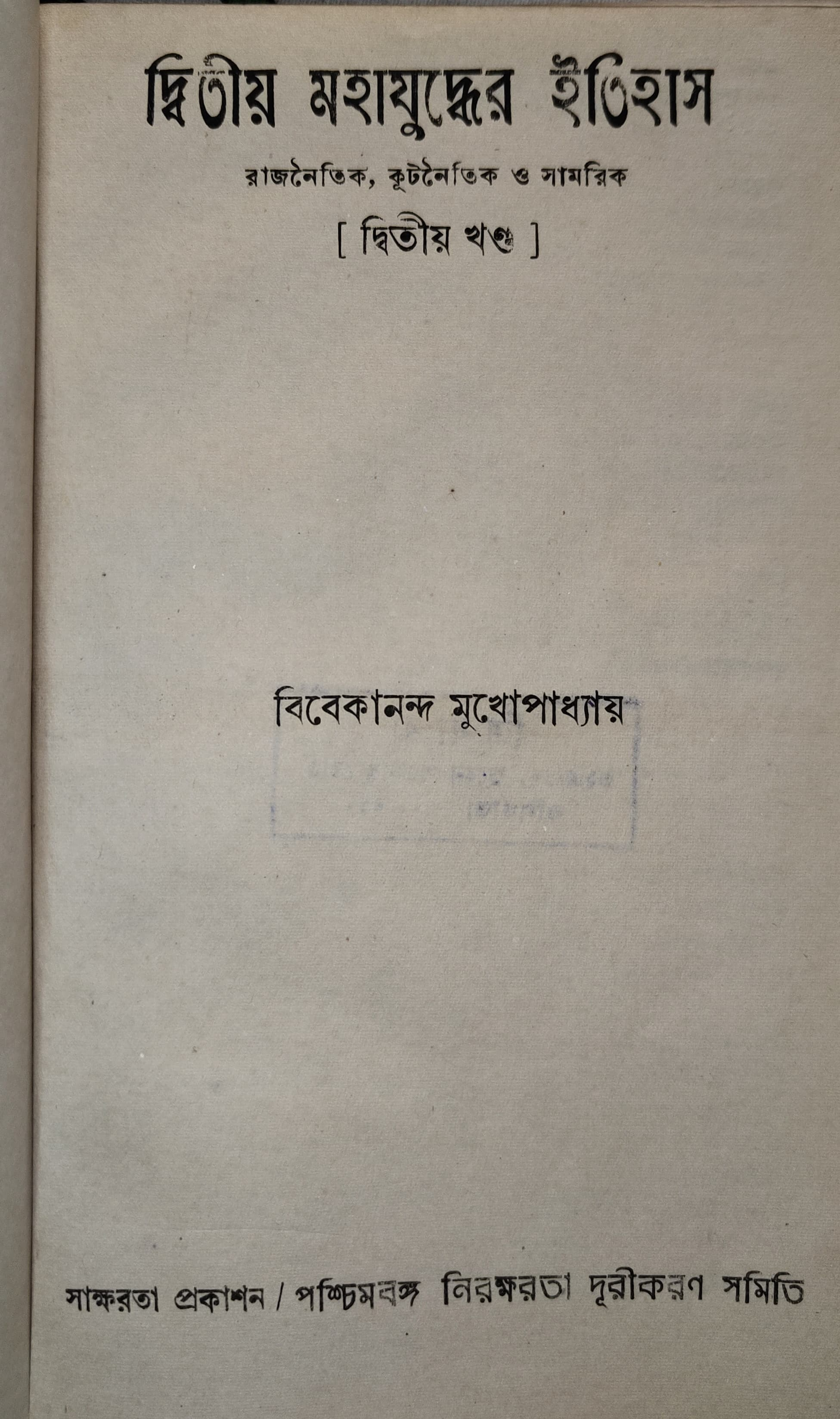
Dwitiya Mahajuddher Itihas Part 2

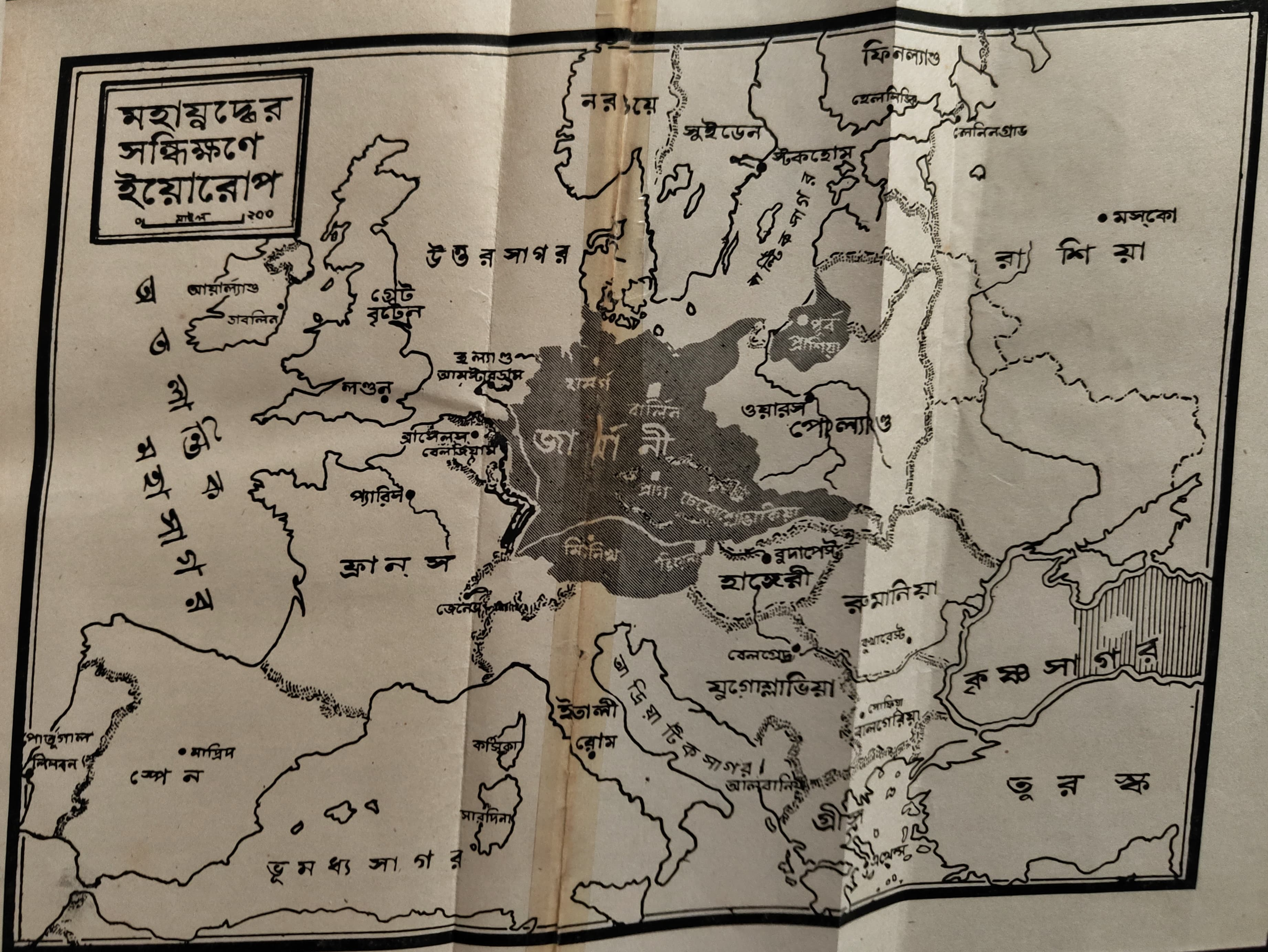
Europe's Map from Dwitiya Mahajuddher Itihas Part 2

Mukhopadhyay had started writing poetry at an early age inspired by the nationalist movement. At the age of 21, when he came to Kolkata in search of livelihood, his poems had already appeared in reputed journals of the city. At that time, he came in contact with Kazi Nazrul Islam for writing poetry. It was his poems which attracted the attention of Satyendranath Mazumdar, famous editor of the new Bengali daily, Ananda Bazar Patrika and in 1925 he joined as an unpaid apprentice. He distinguished himself immediately as a powerful nationalist writer and rose to the position of Assistant Editor in the same year. During his tenure in Anandabazar, the Government forfeited the surety of the daily and demanded higher amount of deposit as punishment for publishing an editorial written by him titled Sahitye Sarkari Dauratmya ("Governmental Mischief in Literature"), a protest against official censorship imposed on creative writing.

After a rewarding stint of 12 years with Anandabazar, in 1937 Mukhopadhyay joined a new Bengali daily Jugantar started by the Amritabazar Patrika group. From 1937 to 1962 he was the editor of Dainik Jugantar Patrika (যুগান্তর পত্রিকা). Vivekananda Mukhopadhyay re-established this traditional paper which was suffering from financial crisis. Edited Dainik Basumati, Satyajug, Bharat Katha magazine (Bengali: দৈনিক বসুমতী, সত্যযুগ, ভারতকথা পত্রিকা). In the same sense, he took over the responsibility of editing financially stricken Dainik Basumati and started the magazine. This magazine gradually became extremely popular due to his achievements. His, probably, the most notable authored work was a three-volume history-oriented omnibus, based on World War II, Dwitiya Mahajuddher Itihas/দ্বিতীয় মহাযুদ্ধের ইতিহাস (1, 2 and 3) Apart from journalism, he became famous for writing about war. His various writings were published on the liberation war of Bangladesh where he highlighted the importance of India's recognition and military assistance to Bangladesh. He wrote the description of the liberation war in various papers including Jugantar, which played an important role in forming public opinion in favour of Bangladesh. After Bangladesh became independent, Vivekananda Mukhopadhyay went there at the invitation of Bangabandhu Sheikh Mujibur Rahman. He was the president of Indo-Soviet Suhrid Sangh. Anti-war journalist Vivekananda Mukhopadhyay was associated with the World Peace Council. In opposition to nuclear testing, he wrote the editorial 'Tejoshkriyo Puishank' (Bengali: তেজস্ক্রিয় পুঁইশাক). His fearless well-thought-out emotional discussions and sharp insights into all kinds of crises in the life of the country and the nation, from documentary analysis of the world situation, have a profound impact on the reading society. At the last stage, he was the editor-in-chief of two new newspapers, 'Dainik Satyajug' and 'Bharat Katha'. His oratory was as popular as his writing.

== Editorials ==
Vivekananda Mukhopadhyay initiated the debate and state debate in Bengali. Authored four research books. They are –

1. 'The Russo-German Struggle' ('রুশ জার্মান সংগ্রাম')
2. 'Japanese War Diaries' (জাপানি যুদ্ধের ডায়রী)
3. 'Unlocking West Asia' (পশ্চিম এশিয়ার বন্ধন মুক্তি)
4. 'Russian US Foreign Policy' (রুশ মার্কিন পররাষ্ট্র নীতি')

His concentrated pursuit of World War II and its international consequences over several decades resulted in the epic "History of the Second World War" (published in two volumes), a unique achievement in Indian languages. In his own words - "Most of my journalistic and editorial career has been spent dealing with armistice and international conflict. During and after World War II, as editor of the daily 'Jugantar', I published many articles on war and international politics. 'Japanese War Diary' and ' "Russo-German Struggle" is a work of that distant period. After those two books were well received by the readership, I decided to write a comprehensive history of the Second World War. His book of poetry is the music of the century.
