= Manmohan Ghose =

Indian poet

Manmohan Ghose (19 January 1869 – 4 January 1924) was an Indian poet and one of the first from India to write poetry in English. He was a brother of Sri Aurobindo.

== Background ==
Manmohan Ghose was born the son of Dr. Krishna Dhan Ghose by his wife, Swarnalata Devi Ghose (née Basu). His ancestral village was in Konnagar, present day Hooghly district. His family was bengali Kayastha , and were among the early adopters of English education. Consequently, they had acquired affluence and the prestige of holding government jobs. Manmohan's father, Krishna Dhun Ghose, was a doctor in the government service, who served as Assistant Surgeon of Rangpur in Bengal. Formerly a member of the Brahmo Samaj religious reform movement, he had become enamoured with the then-new idea of evolution while pursuing medical studies in Britain. (Note: Aurobindo described his father as a "tremendous atheist" but Thakur calls him an agnostic and Heehs believes that he followed his own coda.) Manmohan's mother, Swarnalata Devi, was the daughter of Shri Rajnarayan Bose, a leading figure in the Brahmo Samaj. He was the best friend of Laurence Binyon. Manmohan was the second of siblings. The eldest was his brother, Benoybhusan Ghose, then Manmohan himself, then his brother Sri Aurobindo (the famous revolutionary and ascetic) followed by his only sister Sarojini, and last of all was another brother, Barindrakumar (usually referred to as Barin).

== Career ==
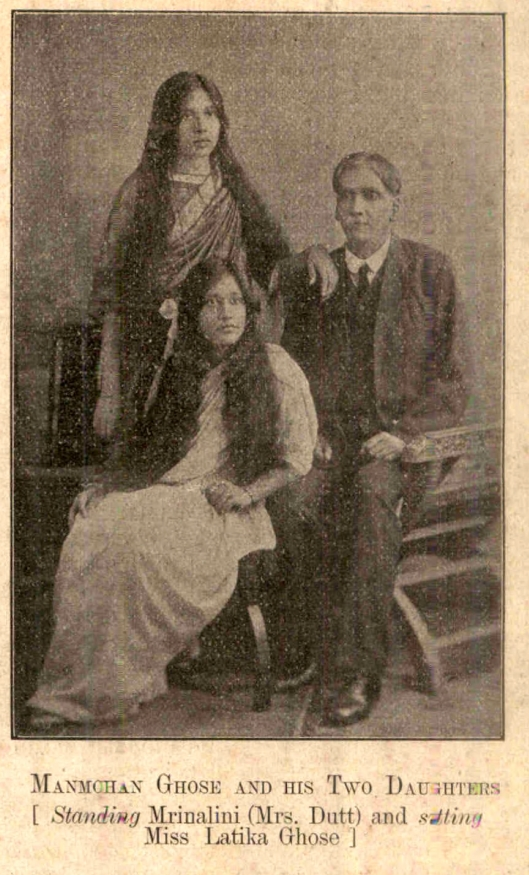
Manhohan Ghose with his daughters Mrinalini and Latika.

He was educated at The Manchester Grammar School (1881–84), St Paul's school in London (1884–87) and won an open scholarship to Christ Church, Oxford.

His work was published in Primavera:Poems by Four Authors (1890), with Laurence Binyon, Arthur S. Cripps, and Stephen Phillips. Ghose later met Oscar Wilde at the Fitzroy Street Settlement, who reviewed Primavera in Pall Mall Gazette, with particular favour towards Ghose. During this time in London Ghose met many other members of the "Rhymers' Club" set such as Lionel Johnson, Ernest Dowson, who were both very fond of him.

In 1893, after his father's death, Ghose returned to India and took a series of teaching posts at Patna, Bankipur, and Calcutta. In 1897, he was appointed assistant professor of Dacca College. After the death of his wife Malati Banerjee in 1918, his health deteriorated and he aged prematurely. For 30 years Ghose had cherished the dream of returning to England and even booked a passage along with his daughter in March 1924, but after a short illness on 4 January 1924 he died in Calcutta.

His daughter left for London and met Laurence Binyon, who helped her edit Songs of love and death, which was published in 1926.

== Bibliography ==
- Heehs, Peter (2008), The Lives of Sri Aurobindo, Columbia University Press, ISBN 978-0-231-14098-0
- Thakur, Bimal Narayan (2004), Poetic Plays of Sri Aurobindo, Northern Book Centre, ISBN 978-81-7211-181-6
- Select Poems of Manmohan Ghose (1975), edited by Lotika Ghose.
- Manmohan Ghose (Modern Indo-English poet) (1990) by Lotika Ghose, Tr. Gulwant Farigh in the Makers of Indian Literature Series.
