= Biplabi Kshudiram =

- বিপ্লবী ক্ষুদিরাম
- Directed by: Hiranmoy Sen
- Screenplay by: Hiranmoy Sen
- Starring: Chhabi Biswas; Chhaya Devi; Tulsi Chakraborty
- Cinematography: Dhiren Dey
- Edited by: Baidyanath Chattopadhyay
- Music by: Debesh Bagchi
- Distributed by: India United Pictures Limited
- Release date: 30 November 1951
- Country: India
- Language: Bengali

Biplabi Kshudiram is a Bengali biographical drama film directed by Hiranmoy Sen based on the life of Indian freedom fighter Khudiram Bose. The film was released on 30 November 1951 under the banner of United Pictures Limited.

== Plot ==
The film revolves with the life and martyrdom of Khudiram Bose, one of the youngest revolutionaries of the Indian independence movement.

== Cast ==
- Amalendu Sarbadhikari as Khudiram Bose
- Chhabi Biswas
- Chhaya Devi
- Tulsi Chakraborty
- Ashu Bose
- Bhaskar Mukhopadhyay
- Amalendu Moitra
- Bhola Pal
- Satya Mukhopadhyay
