= Barindra Kumar Ghosh =

Indian revolutionary and journalist

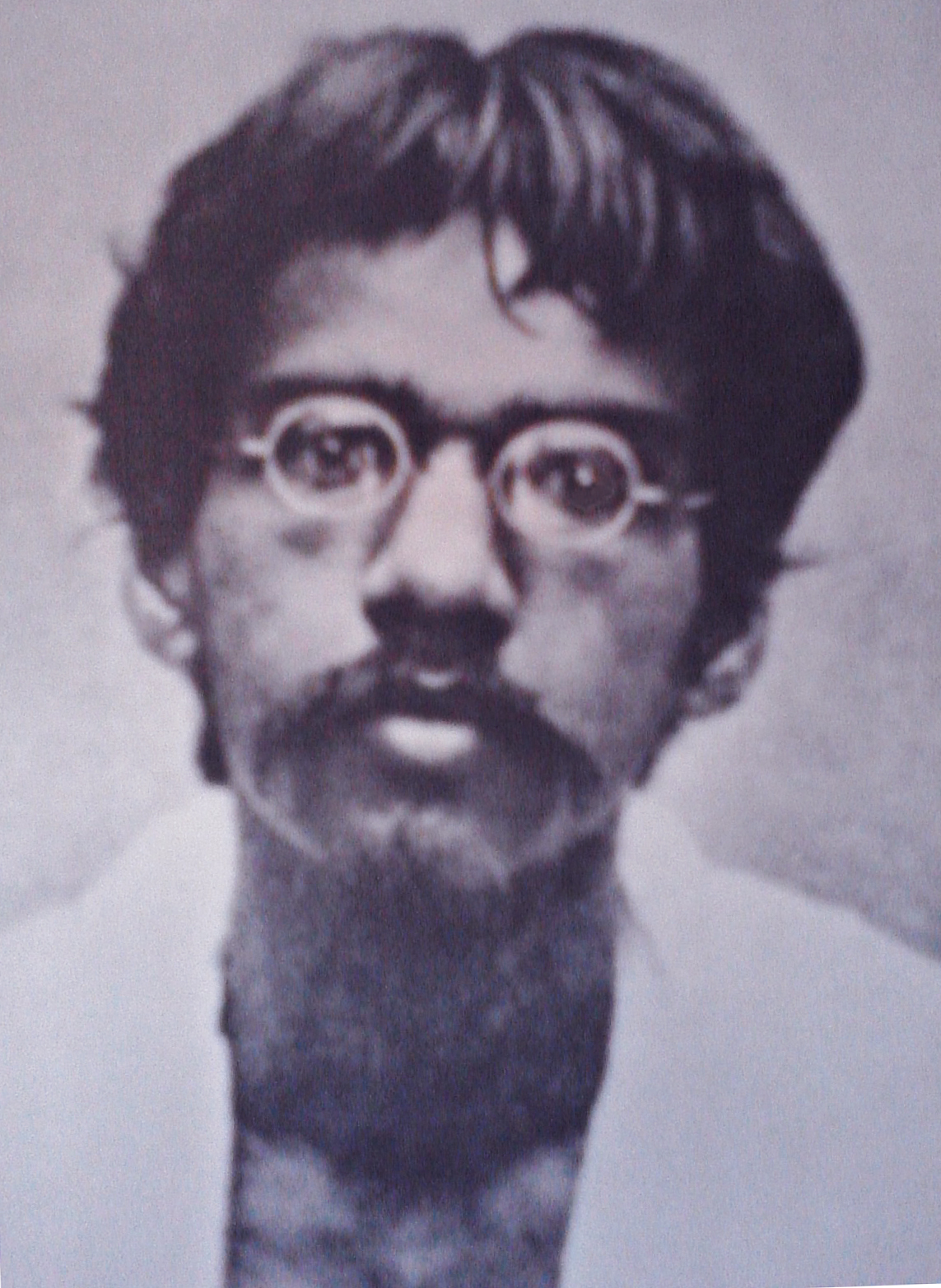
- Barindra Kumar Ghosh
- Born: 5 January 1880; Croydon, Surrey, England
- Died: 18 April 1959 (aged 79); Calcutta, West Bengal, India
- Occupations: Revolutionary, journalist
- Relatives: Sri Aurobindo (brother); Manmohan Ghose (brother)

Barindra Kumar Ghosh or Barindra Ghosh, or popularly Barin Ghosh (5 January 1880 – 18 April 1959), was an Indian Bengali revolutionary and journalist. In 1906, he founded the Bengali weekly Jugantar Patrika and later started a revolutionary group of the same name to further the revolutionary activities for the liberation of India. He was the younger brother of Sri Aurobindo. In 1908, Barindra was arrested, along with his 33 co-workers, and sentenced to death. On appeal, he was sent to life imprisonment. After serving 10 years, he was released as part of Montague-Chelmsford reforms.

He later edited the Bengali weekly Bejoli, the English weekly The Dawn of India, and the Bengali daily Dainik Basumati. Among his other notable works are The Tale of My Exile (1922), Pather Ingit (1930), and the memoir Barinder Atmakatha.

== Early life ==
Barindra Ghosh was born on 5 January 1880, at Croydon, South London, in a Bengali Kayastha family. His ancestral village was at Konnagar, Hooghly of present-day West Bengal. His father, Dr. Krishnadhan Ghosh, was a physician and district surgeon. His mother was Swarnalata, the daughter of Rajnarayan Basu, an author and intellectual during the Bengal Renaissance. Barindra's elder brother was Sri Aurobindo. His second elder brother, Manmohan Ghose, was an English literature scholar, a poet and English professor at Presidency College, Calcutta and at Dhaka University. He also had an elder sister named Sarojini Ghosh.

Barindranath attended school in Deoghar, and after passing the entrance examination in 1901, joined Patna College. He received military training in Baroda. During this time, Barin was influenced by Aurobindo and drawn towards the revolutionary movement.

== Revolutionary activities ==
In 1902, Barin came back to Calcutta (known as Kolkata since 2001), and started organising several revolutionary groups in Bengal with the help of Jatindranath Banerjee. In 1906, he started publishing Jugantar, a Bengali weekly and a revolutionary organisation named Jugantar soon followed. Jugantar was formed from the inner circle of Anushilan Samiti and it started preparation for armed militancy activities to oust British from Indian soil.

Barin and Jatindranath Mukherjee alias Bagha Jatin were instrumental in the recruitment of many young revolutionaries from across Bengal. The revolutionaries formed the Maniktala group in Maniktala, Kolkata. It was a secret place where they started manufacturing bombs and collected arms and ammunition.

Following the attempted killing of Kingsford by two revolutionaries Khudiram and Prafulla on 30 April 1908, the police intensified its investigation which led to the arrest of Barin and Aurobindo Ghosh on 2 May 1908, along with many of his comrades. The trial (known as the Alipore Bomb Case) initially sentenced Aurobindo Ghosh, Barin Ghosh and Ullaskar Datta to death. However, the sentence was reduced to life imprisonment, by Deshbandhu Chittaranjan Das and Barin was deported to the Cellular Jail in Andaman in 1909 along with other convicts. In the Cellular Jail, Barin Ghosh was locked up beside Vinayak Damodar Savarkar and he successfully managed to flee Cellular Jail in 1915. But British caught Barin Ghosh again from Puri after Balasore Battle with Bagha Jatin.

== Release and later activities ==
Barin Ghosh successfully escaped from Cellular Jail and was the only freedom fighter to do so in 1915. He was hiding in Puri during Battle of Balasore, where Bagha Jatin fought the British. Barin Ghosh was caught again from Puri and sent to Cellular Jail in Andamans. He was kept under solitary confinement for 5 long years. During a general amnesty in 1920, Barin was released and returned to Kolkata to start a career in journalism. Soon he left journalism and formed an ashram in Kolkata. He published his memoirs "The Tale of my Exile – Twelve Years in Andamans". In 1923, he left for Pondicherry where his elder brother Aurobindo Ghosh had formed the Sri Aurobindo Ashram. He was influenced by Aurobindo towards spirituality and Sadhana. Barin returned to Kolkata in 1929 and again took up journalism. In 1933 he started an English weekly, The Dawn of India. He was associated with the newspaper The Statesman, and in 1950, he became the editor of the Bengali Dainik Basumati. Around this time he got married. He died on 18 April 1959.

== Works ==
The following are books by Barindra Ghosh:

- Dvipantarer Banshi
- Pather Ingit
- Amar Atmakatha
- Agnijug
- Rishi Rajnarayan
- The Tale of My Exile
- Sri Aurobindo

Other books

- Barindrakumar Ghosh, Pather Ingit, Calcutta, 1337 (Bengali year).
- Upendra Nath Bandyopadhyaya, Nirbasiter Atmakatha, Calcutta, 1352 (Bengali year).
- RC Majumdar, History of the Freedom Movement in India, II, Calcutta, 1963.
