= Sushil Sen =

Bangladeshi revolutionary

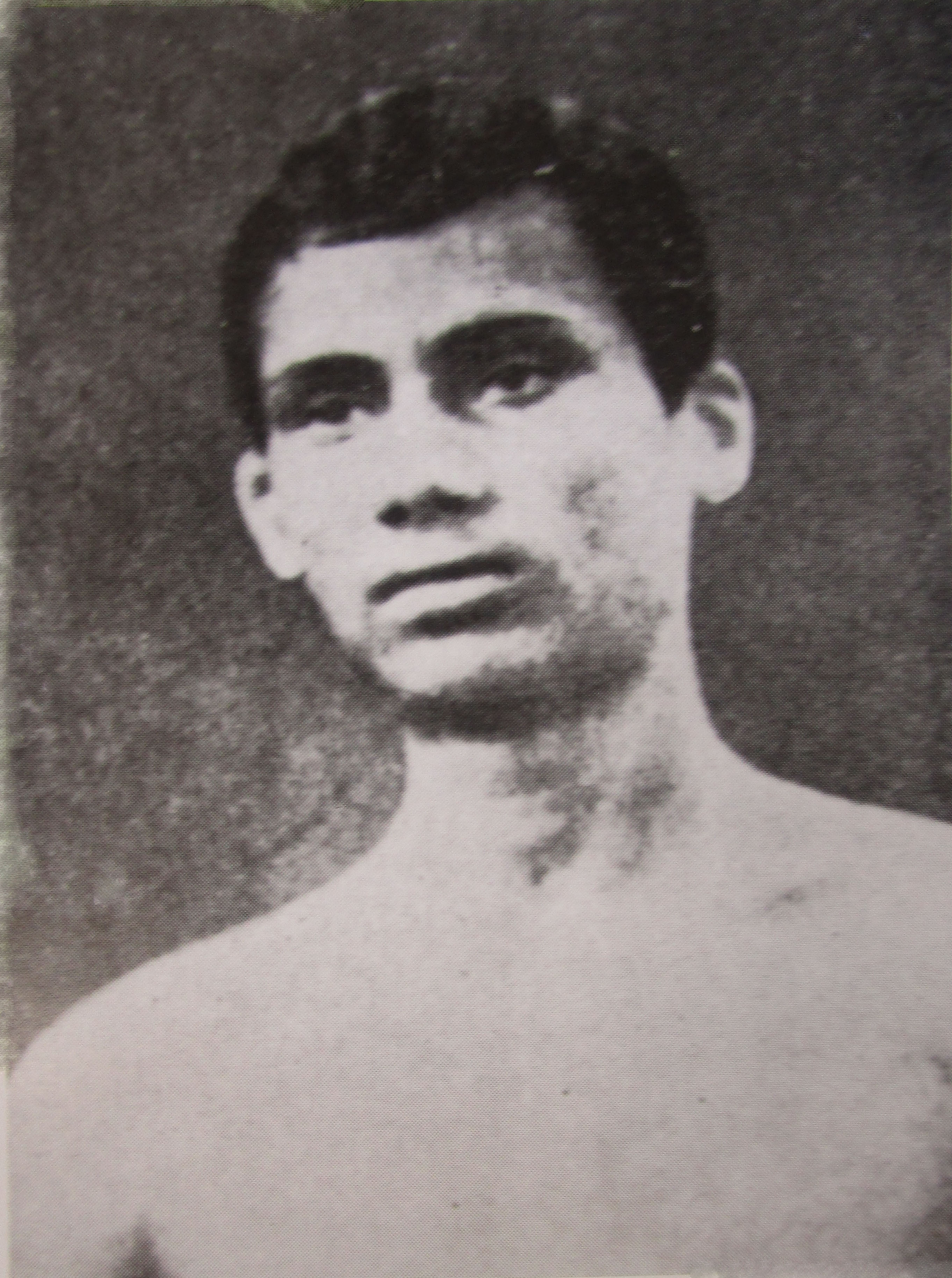
- Born: Sushil Kumar Sen; 1892; Sylhet, Bengal Presidency, British India
- Died: 3 May 1915 (aged 22–23); Khalilpur, Nadia District, West Bengal
- Known for: Alipore Bomb Case

Sushil Kumar Sen (Bengali: সুশীল কুমার সেন; 1892 – 3 May 1915) participated in the Indian Independence Movement.

== Life ==
Sushil Kumar Sen was born in a family of revolutionaries. A meritorious student, he had his early education in Srihatta and Shillong; later in response to the boycott call, he joined the National College, with Aurobindo Ghosh as the principal. At an early age, he was sentenced with fifteen lashes for having participated in a picketing against the British judiciary. Sen developed a patriotic spirit from his childhood and had studied at National College, Calcutta.

== Arrest ==
He was one of the accused in the famous Alipore Bomb Case and was arrested in May 1909. He was sentenced to seven years rigorous imprisonment and later this sentence was canceled by High Court as his role in the Alipore Bomb Case was not proven. However, he had to spend 21 months in jail. He was active in many direct actions and involved in the assassination of Pro British Inspector in Special Investigation Cell Suresh Chandra Mukherjee. He was active in raising resources for revolutionary activities and was successful in collecting about Rs. 10,000/- (Rupees Ten Thousand) during 1915 for Rash Behari Bose's escape to Japan.

== Revolutionary activities ==
He joined Vidyasagar College in Calcutta and passed S.c in first Division in 1913 and received a government scholarship. He was awarded gold medal for securing the first place in Chemistry. For his B.Sc. he joined Presidency College and secured a seat in Eden Hindu Hostel where a number of boarders were adherents of Jatindranath Mukherjee Bagha Jatin. Sushil came under the influence of Jatin. Though he had no intention to get involved in any political or revolutionary activities until he had completed his graduation, Sushil could not come to a decision. However, after an extensive thought on the matter for a week he decided to join the revolutionaries again. He left Eden Hindu Hostel and took up his residence with an orthodox family in Manicktala Street. Being a member of Jatindranath Mukherjee's group Sushil took an active role in the murder of Inspector Suresh Mukherjee on 28 February 1915. Sushil again appeared in May 1915. A dacoity was committed by a group at Pragpur in Nadia District on 30 April and thereafter they came to village Khalilpur by boats.

== Death ==
The Bengal revolutionaries were planning and carried out from Calcutta two heroic political dacoities in district Nadia at Pragpur and Shibpur. These dacoities were conceived and executed in the light of anticipated armed rising with German aid in coordination with Ghadr Party patriots. Apart from the idea of procuring money, the revolutionaries also had the idea of getting some training in guerrilla tactics.

A group of revolutionaries of Jugantar Party conducted a raid in village Pragpur on 30 April 1915. They went by boat and committed dacoity in the shop of Harinath Saha in village Pragpur Police Station Daulatpur. Mouser pistols and a huge quantity of ammunition and safe-breaking implements were sent from Calcutta. Cash and ornaments to the value of Rs. 7000 were acquired. After the dacoity had taken place, the plan for returning to Calcutta misfired. Much of the journey had to be completed by boat. On the riverbank, they were attacked by the villagers and the police and an open fight took place. Sushil Sen was shot in both legs. An injured Sushil immediately asked his accompanying persons to first shoot him then separate his head from the body after his death and bury the body and head at different places to relieve them of the load of carcass as well as to make it difficult for the identification by Police. This was done accordingly and police was not able to trace any evidence in this matter till February, 1916. Thirteen people were arrested in this Pragpur Dacoity Case, including Ashutosh Lahiri, Gopendralal Roy, Kshitish Sanyal and Phani Bhusan Roy. Three of them were sentenced to expatriation for seventeen years each, while the fourth was sentenced to deportation for eight years. All the four were sent off to the Andamans.
