= Prafulla Chaki =

Indian freedom fighter (1888–1908)

Prafulla Chandra Chaki
- প্রফুল্ল চন্দ্র চাকী
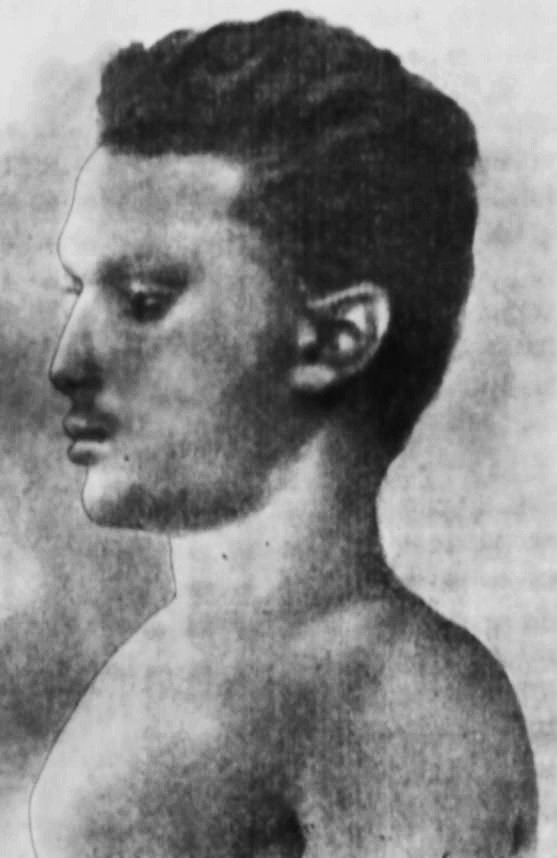
- Born: Prafulla Chaki; 10 December 1888; Bogra, Bengal Presidency, British India
- Died: 2 May 1908 (aged 19); Mokama, Patna, Bengal Presidency, British India
- Occupation: Freedom fighters of India
- Organization: Jugantar
- Known for: Role in Indian independence movement

Prafulla Chandra Chaki // (Bengali: প্রফুল্ল চাকী, Prafulla Chaki alias Dinesh Chandra Roy) (10 December 1888 – 2 May 1908) was an Indian revolutionary associated with the Jugantar group of revolutionaries who carried out an assassination attempt against a British colonial official in an attempt to secure Indian independence.

Prafulla and Khudiram Bose tried to assassinate the notorious district judge of Muzaffarpur, Douglas Kingsford, by throwing bombs at a carriage they believed Kingsford was traveling in, but he was not in the carriage, and two British women were killed instead. Prafulla committed suicide when he was about to be arrested by the police. Khudiram was arrested and tried for the murder of the two women and sentenced to death. Mahatma Gandhi denounced the violence and regretted the deaths of the two women. He stated that "the Indian people will not win their freedom through these methods". However, Bal Gangadhar Tilak, in his newspaper Kesari, defended the two young men and called for immediate swaraj. This was followed by the immediate arrest of Tilak by the British colonial government on charges of sedition.

== Early life ==
Prafulla Chandra Chaki was born into a well-to-do Jotedar family on 10 December 1888 in Bihar, a village in Bogra District of current day Bangladesh, then a part of the Bengal Presidency. His father's name was Rajnarayan Chaki, and his mother's name was Swarnomoyee Devi. Rajnarayan's ancestor Prankrishna Chaki (his grandfather) was a resident of Chanchakia. He was the fifth child in his family. Rajnarayan was an employee in the Nagar estate. He started his education at Namuja Janada Prasad English School, an English-medium school in Bogra. After completing his primary education, he came to Rangpur with his elder brother, Pratap Chandra Chaki, whose father-in-law was a reputed person in Rangpur. He was expelled from Rangpur Zilla School in Class 9 for taking part in a students' demonstration that violated East Bengal law. He then joined Rangpur National School, where he came in contact with revolutionaries and became a believer and practitioner of revolutionary philosophies.

== Revolutionary activities ==
Barin Ghosh brought Prafulla to Calcutta, and he was enlisted in the Jugantar party. His first assignment was to kill Sir Joseph Bampfylde Fuller (1854-1935), the first Lieutenant Governor of the new province of Eastern Bengal and Assam. However, the plan did not materialize.

Next, Prafulla, along with Khudiram Bose, was chosen for the assassination of Kingsford, the magistrate of Muzaffarpur, Bihar. Kingsford, during his previous tenure as the Chief Presidency Magistrate of Calcutta, was unpopular for passing harsh and cruel sentences on young political workers of Bengal. He was also noted for inflicting corporal punishments on such workers. This led to the planning of his murder, and Chaki and Bose were selected and sent to Muzaffarpur to execute this task. Prafulla took the fake name Dinesh Chandra Ray in this operation.

== Muzaffarpur killing ==
Khudiram and Prafulla watched the usual movements of Kingsford and prepared a plan to kill him. On the evening of 30 April 1908, the duo was waiting in front of the gate of the European Club for Kingsford's carriage to arrive. When a vehicle came out of the gate, a bomb was thrown into the carriage. There was a mistake towards identification by them, as the vehicle was carrying the daughter and the wife of a local congressman. Both were killed by the bomb, and the revolutionaries fled.

== Manhunt and suicide ==
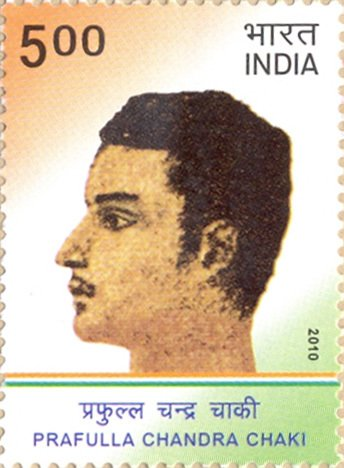
Stamp of India 2010 Prafulla Chandra Chaki

Prafulla and Khudiram took separate routes to escape. Nandalal Banerjee, a police officer travelling in the same compartment, grew suspicious of Prafulla and attempted to arrest him on the Mokama railway station platform. But Prafulla committed suicide by shooting himself using his own revolver. His head was severed from his body and sent to Kolkata to be identified by Khudiram, who subsequently got captured.

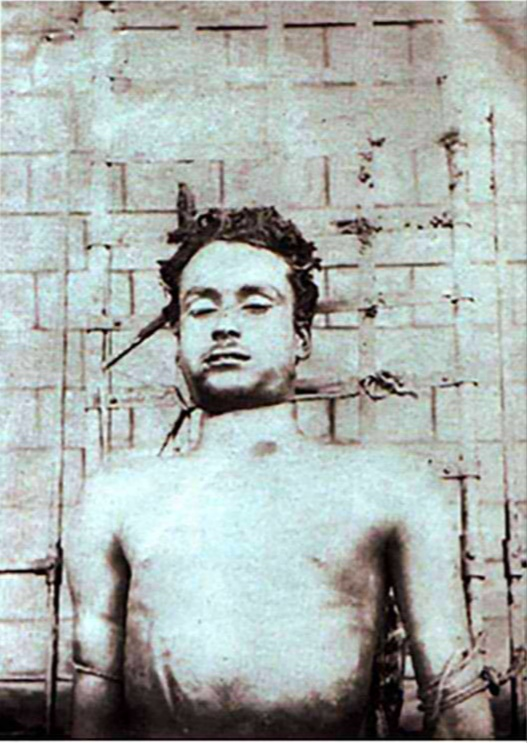
Martyr Prafulla Chaki, Samadhi ceremony (front)

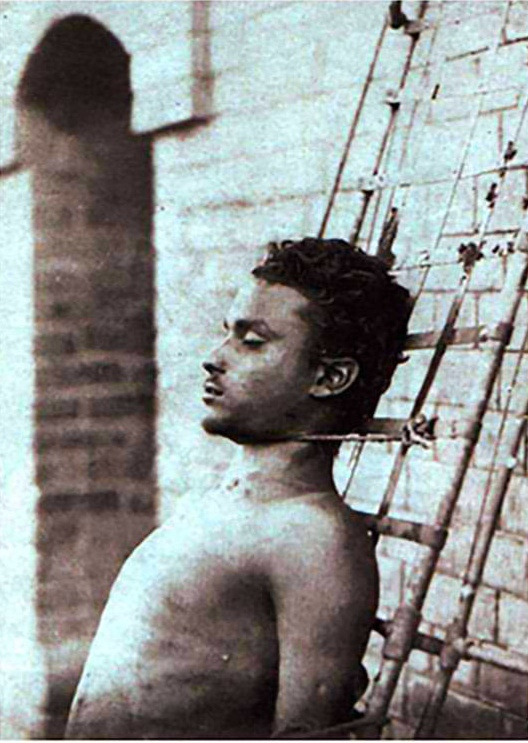
Martyr Prafulla Chaki, Samadhi ceremony (leftside)

Khudiram was later arrested and hanged to death. Following this incident, inspector Nandalal was assassinated by two young revolutionaries, Srishh Pal and Ranen Ganguly. Their relatives live in Uttar Dinajpur and Dakshin Dinajpur in West Bengal. Pratap Chanda Chaki's great grandson, Subrata Chaki, lives in Kolkata.
