= Jugantar Patrika =

Bengali revolutionary newspaper founded in 1906

Jugantar Patrika (Bengali: যুগান্তর) was a Bengali revolutionary newspaper founded in 1906 in Calcutta by Barindra Kumar Ghosh, Abhinash Bhattacharya and Bhupendranath Dutt. A political weekly, it was founded in March 1906 and served as the propaganda organ for the nascent revolutionary organisation Anushilan Samiti that was taking shape in Bengal at the time. The journal derived its name 'Jugantar' (lit.: New Era) from a political novel of the same name by Bengali author Sivanath Shastri. The journal went on to lend its name to the Western Bengal wing of the Anushilan Samiti, which came to be known as the Jugantar group. The journal expounded and justified revolutionary violence against the British Raj as a political tool for independence, and denounced the right and legitimacy of the British rule in India. It was also critical of the Indian National Congress and its moderate methods which was viewed as aiding the Raj. Its target audience was the young, literate and politically motivated youth of Bengal, and was priced at one paisa.

== Growth and prosecution ==
The paper rapidly acquired a broad popularity, at one time having a readership of 20,000. Bhupendranath Dutt served as the editor of the newspaper until his arrest in 1907, although it also published articles from a number of noted Bengali revolutionaries including Hemchandra Kanungo, Barindra Kumar Ghosh and Aurobindo Ghosh. It faced prosecution a number of times by the British Indian government for publishing seditious articles. Bhupendranath Dutt was arrested in 1907 for publication of articles "inciting violence against the Government of India", for which he was sentenced to a year's rigorous imprisonment. The paper was ultimately forced to shut down in 1908, amidst financial ruins following the prosecutions, and after the passage of The Newspapers (Incitement to Offences) Act in June 1908 which made its position vulnerable.

== Revival and demise ==
The newspaper was revived after India's independence from British rule. Its daily circulation increased to a peak of 80,000 copies during the eighties. However poor management and increasing operational costs resulted in dwindling readership. Finally the newspaper was forced to shut down due to huge bank debts and financial losses.
