= Herbert Broom =

Herbert Broom (1815–1882) was an English writer on law.

== Life ==
Broom was born at Kidderminster in 1815, and was educated at Trinity College, Cambridge, where he graduated as a wrangler in 1837. He proceeded LL.D. in 1864. He was called to the bar at the Inner Temple in Michaelmas term 1840, and practised on the home circuit. For a considerable period he occupied the post of reader of common law at the Inner Temple. He died at the Priory, Orpington, Kent, on 2 May 1882.

Legal Maxims (1845) gained wide circulation as an established text-book for students.

== Works ==
Law books

- Practical Rules for determining Parties to Actions, 1843.
- Legal Maxims, 1845. third edition, 1858 Fifth edition, 1870.
- Practice of Superior Courts, 1850.
- Practice of County Courts, 1852.
- Commentaries on the Common Law, 1856. fourth London edition 1873
- Constitutional Law viewed in relation to Common Law and exemplified by Cases, 1st edition 1866; 2nd edition 1885.
- Commentaries on the Laws of England (with E. Hadley), 1869.
- Philosophy of Law; Notes of Lectures, 1876-8.

Novels

- The Missing Will, 1877
- The Unjust Steward, 1879
