= Satyendranath Bosu =

Indian revolutionary (1882–1908)

Satyendra Nath Bosu
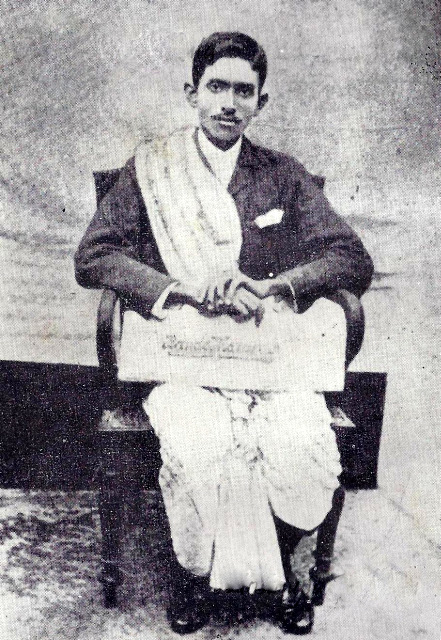
- Satyendra Nath Bosu, Bengali Revolutionary
- Born: 30 July 1882; Midnapore District, Bengal Presidency, India
- Died: 21 November 1908 (aged 26); Alipore Jail, Calcutta, British India
- Organization: Jugantar
- Known for: Role in Indian freedom struggle

Satyendra Nath Bosu (aka. Satyendranath Bose or Satyen Bose; 30 July 1882 – 21 November 1908) was an Indian nationalist of the Anushilan Samiti. Bosu, while held in Alipore Jail hospital as an under-trial in the Alipore Bomb Case, shot dead the Crown witness Narendranath Goswami with the help of fellow prisoner Kanailal Dutta, leading to the collapse of the case against prime suspect Aurobindo. Bosu gave himself up on the jail premises and was subsequently put on trial. Along with Dutta, he was found guilty and executed by hanging on 21 November 1908 for the murder of Goswami.

== Early life ==
Satyendranath was born on 30 July 1882 in Midnapore district (presently Paschim Midnapore) of West Bengal, India. His father, Abhaya Charan Bosu, was a professor in Midnapur College. Around 1850, he settled at Midnapur, which became the residence of Satyendranath's family. Abhaya Charan had five sons (Jnanendra Nath, Satyendra Nath, Bhupendra Nath, Subodh Kumar and another boy) and three daughters. Satyendranath was the maternal uncle of Shri Aurobindo, though he was about ten years younger. The Bosu family originally hailed from the village Boral of district 24 Parganas, and were the descendants of famous Babu Raj Narayan Bosu. Babu Nanda Kishore Bosu, the father of Babu Raj Narayan Bosu, was a follower of Raja Ram Mohan Roy and was the first of his family to be initiated into Brahmoism. Babu Nanda Kishore had three sons, the eldest of whom was Babu Raj Narayan. The reputation of Babu Raj Narayan as a man of piety and letters was widespread. Additionally, he was a distinguished member of the Adi Brahmo Samaj and was a Senior Scholar of the then Hindu College. His two younger brothers were Madan Mohan and Abhaya Charan. Around the year 1850, Babu Raj Narayan, along with his two younger brothers, left his ancestral village and settled at Midnapur where he was appointed Headmaster of the district School. In 1867, he retired from Government service and moved to Calcutta, where he lived for some time. In 1880 he finally settled with his family at Deoghur and died in the year 1899.

Having successfully passed the Entrance and F.A. Examinations, Satyendranath studied up to the B.A. standard of the Calcutta University but did not go up for the B.A. Examination. He left college and served for about a year at the Midnapur Collectorate.

== Revolutionary activities ==
Satyendranath became involved in the murder case of Narendranath Goswami among other events, in which there were three events of armed revolution at the dawn of the twentieth century.

=== Midnapur arms case ===
Satyendranath was arrested by the police on the charge of possessing a gun which was licensed in his brother's name at Midnapore. He was convicted and sentenced to two months' rigorous imprisonment, according to the police report.

=== Alipore Bomb Case ===
Police raided the premises at 32 Murari Pukur Road at Kolkata on 2 May 1908 and a bomb-factory was discovered along with a cache of arms, a large quantity of ammunition, bombs, detonators and other tools. They also confiscated revolutionary literature.

Muraripukur Garden House of Barin Ghosh

The raids were being conducted at various places throughout Bengal and Bihar, and more detention was on the way. Aurobindo Ghosh, Barindra Kumar Ghose, Hemchandra Kanungo, Ullaskar Dutt, Indu Bhusan Roy and many others were arrested. During this time, one detainee, Narendranath Goswami (aka Naren Gossain), became an approver of the British, and started revealing the names of many involved persons to the police, leading to further arrests.

Goswami was a resident of Srirampur near Chandernagore, and he knew all the plans and activities of the revolutionaries. Appearing in the witness box, he started implicating many of his former colleagues by mentioning their names. Barin Ghosh, Shanti Ghosh and Ullaskar Dutta's names were mentioned for their alleged involvement in an attempt to bomb the governor's train at Chandernagore station in 1908, and when referring to the bomb outrage in the Mayor's house he mentioned the name of Charu Chandra Roy: the leader of the revolutionary outfit of Chandernagore. On 24 June, Goswami mentioned the names of Aurobindo Ghosh and Subodh Chandra Mallik as a link to revolutionary activities.

=== A conspiracy hatched ===
The under-trial prisoners under the leadership in Barin Ghosh and Hemchandra Kanungo hatched a plan to escape from the Alipur Central Jail, and also to get rid of Goswami. B.C. Roy, Barrister-at-law, defending the prisoners, offered help with men and arms. Barin wrote letters from jail to Sudhangshu Jiban Rai, Preo Shankar Rai and Basanta Banerjee of Chandernagore to meet B. C. Roy for arrangements of arms. He also wrote to Shrish Chandra Ghosh to send phial, acid for the purpose of throwing to jail wardens and wax to copy keys. On Sunday, 23 August, one revolver was smuggled into the jail by Shudhangshu Jiban Rai. Next day Barin asked Hemchandra Kanungo to give it to Satyendranath with instruction to kill Goswami. That time Satyendranath was admitted in the jail Hospital. He expressed his inability to use such a big revolver, and returned it back. On Sunday, 30 August, another revolver reached Barin though Shrish. it was a smaller one. Kanailal took it, and subsequently got admitted to the jail hospital. The Revolvers were received loaded. The stage was set.

=== Murder of Narendranath Goswami ===
It was time for retribution for the traitor inside Presidency Jail. It appears that the Narendranath, intentionally kept separated from the other prisoners, was confined in the European Ward in Alipore Central Jail. On 31 August 1908, Narerdranath was brought, from that ward, to the Jail Hospital by a European Convict Overseer named Highens. Narendranath had apparently previously arranged to meet, at that time, in the hospital, two fellow prisoners, who were already patients in the Jail Hospital, named Kanailal Dutta and Satyendranath Bosu. Kanailal and Satyendra managed to acquire two revolvers secretly. Shrish Chandra Ghosh of Chandernagore smuggled the revolvers into the jail, assisted by Motilal Roy. Narendranath had apparently been approached by the second of these prisoners, who had pretended that he also wished to make a statement; and his visit was really in order to get this statement. Evidently it was however part of a plot to get Narendranath within striking distance for it appears that almost immediately on Narendranath's arrival on the landing, at the head of the staircase leading to the second story of the hospital, these two prisoners opened fire on him with the two revolvers. Highens the Convict Overseer attempted to arrest one of them and was shot through the wrist. Narendranath although shot in several places was not mortally hit and fled down the stairs, out of the Hospital Compound and along an alley way towards the gate. Kanailal Dutta pursued him and shot him fatally through the back. He was then secured by a Eurasian Prisoner named Linton.

Kanailal Dutta and Satyen Bosu arrested after murder of Naren Goswami

(Excerpts from a letter No 1876-C dated 31 August 1908, addressed to The Chief Secretary to the Government of Bengal, Calcutta from Commissioner of Police, Calcutta.

=== Nine shots fired ===
Excerpts from the Magistrate's commitment order in the case of murder of Narendranath Goswami (spellings unchanged):

"The two revolvers were brought into the office and examined and the smaller one (Exhibit I) was found to have in the chambers four discharged cartridges while the larger (Exhibit II) had five discharged cartridges and one loaded cartridge. Thus we may assume that in all nine shots were fired. Four bullets were found — two inside the dispensary, one just outside the dispensary, and one was extracted from the dead body of Norendra. From the medical evidence it appears that this was the bullet which caused Norendra's death. It entered fairly high up in the back and severed the spinal cord and almost completely penetrated the breast in front but spent its force before doing so and lay imbedded under the skin of the breast. Exhibit VII is this bullet (contained in a glass bottle sealed by Captain Daley). An examination of this bullet shows that it was fired from the larger of the two revolvers (Exhibit II). The evidence of Linton shows that the revolver was the one used by Kanai Lall Dutt. Thus the fatal shot was fired by Kanai Lall Dutt."

== Trial, sentencing and death ==
The murder of Narendranath Goswami was a daring act previously unparalleled in the history of revolutionary terrorism. On 5 September 1908 the Indu Prakash made the following observation:

"The Bengal anarchists were perhaps the most romantic lot in the whole anarchist world, and in point of bravery, daredevilry and cunning they were no doubt far ahead of Russian and Spanish desperadoes - quick in action, quick in revenge and smart in getting rid of any approver."

On 21 October 1908, the High Court pronounced its judgment by giving the sentence of death to both the accused. Kanailal declined to file an appeal against such an order. The sentence was carried out on 10 November 1908, and Kanailal was hanged in the Alipore Jail at about seven in the morning. In the trial of Satyendranath, the Sessions Judge, disagreeing with the majority verdict of the jury, referred the case to the High Court and there Satyendranath was convicted and sentenced to death. He was hanged on 21 November 1908.

While fleeing from Muzaffarpur, on 2 May 1908, Prafulla Chaki was cornered at the Mokama Ghat railway station and was about to be arrested when he killed himself by firing two shots: one at the forehead and the other on the left side of his chest at the head. Khudiram Bose was the first martyr in the history of revolutionary movement for Indian independence. Kanailal Dutta was the second, and Satyendranath Bosu was the third. The execution of these men in 1908 aroused great commotion in public life. The witnesses' accounts of the final moments before martyrdom and accounts of their sacrifices became canonical.

== See also ==
- Indian Independence Movement
- Indian nationalism
- Revolutionary movement for Indian independence
