= Historical Indian flags =

Before the independence of India, the Indian subcontinent did not have a single national flag but rather several political entities of varying sizes had their own flags. Historic polities usually did not have a national flag but rather flags for their dynasty, state and armies.

== Flags of historical polities ==
=== Medieval and early modern India ===
Flag	Duration	Use	Description	References
	566–1949	Flag of the Kingdom of Mewar	Triangular flag with a Sun, Moon and scales of Justice.	
	1103–1750	Flag of The Kingdom of Thekkumkur	Orange Flag with a red Lion	
	1320–1413	Flag of the Tughlaq dynasty of the Delhi Sultanate according to the Catalan Atlas, but there is no evidence this was actually used by the Delhi Sultanate.	A gray flag with a black strip left of center.	
	1320–1323 1339–1589	Flag of the Kashmir Sultanate.	A red rectangular flag.	
	1518–1687	Flag of the Qutb Shahi Dynasty of the Sultanate of Golconda.	A teal rectangular flag.	
	1490–1636	Flag of the Ahmadnagar Sultanate	A green triangular swallowtail shaped flag.	(Note: Flags of Ahmadnagar from the Battle of Talikota from the Ta'rif-i Husain Shahi (Chronicle of Husain Shah): ) (Note: Flags of Ahmadnagar from the drawing, Sultan Husain Nizam Shah I on Horseback: )
	?	The various flags of the Mughal Empire.	Sun and Lion flag of the Mughal Empire.	
	1526-?	The various flags of the Mughal Empire.	Alam of the Mughal Empire.	
	?	The various flags of the Mughal Empire.	Flag of the Mughal Emperor Shah Jahan.	
	c.1699–1818	Flag of the Kingdom of Amber.		
	c.1629-1809	Flag of the Kingdom of Travancore	Used after the rise of Maharaja Marthanda Varma.	
	1674–1818	The Bhagwa Dhwaj, Flag of the Maratha Empire.	A saffron colored swallowtail flag.	
	1799-1849	Nishan Sahib, Flag of the Sikh Empire		

=== Modern India ===
For the flags of princely states, see Flags of Indian princely states.

Flag	Duration	Use	Description	References
	1880–1947	Civil Ensign of India used sometimes to represent India internationally.	A Red Ensign with the Union Jack at the canton, defaced with the Star of India emblem displayed in the fly.	
	1943–1945 (Note: Used from 1931–1947 by the Indian National Congress.)	The Swaraj Flag, de facto flag of the Azad Hind.	Three horizontal strips of saffron, white and green with a blue chakra in the centre.	

==== Dutch India ====
Flag	Duration	Use	Description
	1605 – 1825	Flag of Dutch India	Flag of the Dutch East India Company

==== Swedish India ====
Flag	Duration	Use	Description
	1731-1733	Flag of the Swedish East India Company	Briefly used prior to the Affair of Porto Novo

==== Danish India ====
Flag	Duration	Use	Description
	1620 – 1869	Flag of Danish India	Flag of Denmark
	1620 – 1869	Flag of Danish India	Naval flag of Danish East India Company

==== Portuguese India ====
Flag	Duration	Use	Description
	1500-1505	Flag of Casa da Índia	Flag of the Portugues India. White ensign with a Green Cross
	1500-1505	Flag of Casa da Índia	Portuguese Sailors uses the Banner of the Order of Christ as a Naval ensign during the Portuguese India Armadas.
	1505 – 1521	Flag of the Portuguese monarchy	White square flag with the Coat of arms of Portugal in the center.
	1521 – 1578	Flag of the Portuguese monarchy	White rectangular flag with the Coat of arms of Portugal in the center.
	1578 – 1640	Flag of the Portuguese monarchy	White rectangular flag with the Coat of arms of Portugal in the center.
	1616 – 1640	Flag of the Portuguese monarchy	additional flag used during this period to denote The Portuguese Empire
	1650 – 1667	Flag of the Portuguese monarchy	White square flag with the Coat of arms of Portugal in the center.
	1667 – 1706	Flag of the Portuguese monarchy	White square flag with the Coat of arms of Portugal in the center.
	1706 – 1750 1826 – 1830	Flag of the Portuguese monarchy	White square flag with the Coat of arms of Portugal in the center.
	1750 – 1816	Flag of the Portuguese monarchy	White square flag with the Coat of arms of Portugal in the center.
	1816 – 1826	Flag of the Portuguese monarchy	White square flag with the Coat of arms of Portugal in the center.
	1830 – 1910	Flag of the Portuguese monarchy	White square flag with the Coat of arms of Portugal in the center. Vertical blue and white stripes in a 1:1 ratio.
	1911 – 1961 (de facto) 1911 – 1974 (de jure)	Flag of the Portuguese Republic	It was first used for the Portuguese Republic in 1910. Portugal continued to use this flag for Portuguese India until 1974, when it formally recognized the Indian liberation of Goa in 1961.
	1932	Proposed flag of Portuguese India.	Designed by Afonso de Ornelas.
	1967 (proposed)	Proposed Colonial flag of Goa.	Proposed by F. P. de Almeida Langhans. Never put into use.

==== French India ====
Flag	Duration	Use	Description
	1667 – 1791	Flag of the French Monarchy	Used as a personal standard.
	1791 – 1815	Flag of the French First Republic and the First French Empire	A triband Flag of France with Red, white and Blue
	1815 – 1830	Flag of the French Empire	Flag of French India during the Bourbon Restoration
	1830 – 1940 1944 – 1955	1830 – 1848: Flag of the French Monarchy. 1848 – 1852: Flag of the Second French Republic. 1852 – 1870: Flag of the Second French Empire. 1870 – 1940: Flag of the Third French Republic and the French Empire. 1944 – 1952: Flag of the Fourth French Republic.	Flag of the French Republic
	1940 – 1944	Flag of Free France Forces during World War 2	Flag of the French Republic defaced with the Cross of Lorraine

== Flags of military of historical polities ==
=== Modern India ===
==== British Raj (1858-1947) ====
Flag	Date	Use	Description
	1863–1947	1877–1892 Ensign of Her Majesty's Indian Marine. 1892–1928: Ensign of the Royal Indian Marine. 1928–1934: Naval jack of the Royal Indian Marine. 1934–1947: Naval jack of the Royal Indian Navy.	A Blue Ensign with the Union Jack at the canton, and the Star of India displayed in the fly.
	1878–1947	Flag of the Indian Army Service Corps.	A Blue Ensign with the Union Jack at the canton, and the Star of India crossed by two swords displayed in the fly.
	1884–1928	1884–1892 Naval jack of Her Majesty's Indian Marine 1892–1928: Naval jack of the Royal Indian Marine	The Union Jack with blue border.
	1928–1950	1928–1934: Ensign of the Royal Indian Marine 1934–1950: Ensign of the Royal Indian Navy	The White Ensign of the Royal Navy.
	1928–1958	1928–1932: Flag of the Flag Officer Commanding and Director, Royal Indian Marine 1934–1950: Flag of a Flag Officer, Royal Indian Navy 1950–1958: Flag of a Flag Officer, Indian Navy	Ensign of a Rear-Admiral in the Royal Navy.
	1934–1958	1934–1948: Flag of the Flag Officer Commanding, Royal Indian Navy 1948–1950: Flag of the Chief of the Naval Staff and Commander-in-Chief, Royal Indian Navy 1950–1954: Flag of the Chief of the Naval Staff and Commander-in-Chief, Indian Navy 1955–1958: Flag of the Chief of the Naval Staff, Indian Navy	Ensign of a Vice-Admiral in the Royal Navy.
	1942–1947	Ensign of the British Indian Army.	Red field emblazoned with Star of India crossed by two swords and beneath the Tudor Crown.
	1945-1947	Ensign of the Royal Indian Air Force	A field of air force blue with the United Kingdom's flag in the canton and the Royal Indian Air Force's roundel in the fly.
	1954–1955	1954–1955: Flag of the Chief of the Naval Staff and Commander-in-Chief, Indian Navy 1955: Flag of the Chief of the Naval Staff, Indian Navy	The St George's Cross. Ensign of an Admiral in the Royal Navy.

==== Azad Hind (1943-1945) ====
Flag	Date	Use	Description
	1942-1945	Flag of the Indian Legion, in Nazi Germany. Part of the German Wehrmacht and later the Waffen SS.	3 horizontal strips, top being saffron, middle being white and lowest being green with a sprinting tiger in center and Azad Hind written on the flag.

== Proposed flags of Indian polities ==
Flag	Date	Use	Description	References
	1902	Design reported in the Daily Express to have been proposed as part of a series of Empire flags that would replace the Union Jack in representing individual territories of the British Empire	The Cross of Saint George and the crown in the canton would have been present on all Empire flags to represent the English. In the top right would have been the emblem of the territory flying the flag, and in this case, the Star of India. A large sun in the centre symbolizes "the empire on which the sun never sets."	
	Proposed in 1904, used in April 1910	Flag proposed in an issue of an Anglo-Indian weekly.	Dark blue, green and light blue triband with a purple band at the hoist depicting the Orion constellation. A thin red border surrounds the whole flag.	
	1921	Mahatma Gandhi's Original Proposal.	Two strips of Green and Red with a spinning wheel in center.	
	1921	Gandhi's flag, introduced at the Indian National Congress meeting in 1921.	Three strips of White, Green and red with a spinning wheel in center.	
	1947	Louis Mountbatten's proposed flag for India.	The Swaraj flag with a small Union Flag in the canton.	

== Flags used in the Indian Independence Movement ==
Flag	Date	Use	Description	References
	1906	The Calcutta Flag, used in the Swadeshi movement.	Three horizontal bands of equal with the top being orange, the centre yellow, and the bottom green. It had eight half-opened lotus flowers on the top stripe, and a picture of the sun and a crescent moon on the bottom stripe (Vande Mātaram) was inscribed in the centre in Devanagari.	
	1907	Alternative versions of the Calcutta flag.	Three horizontal bands, top being green, middle being yellow and lowest being red. It has lotus flower on the top stripe.	
	1907	Alternative versions of the Calcutta flag.	Three horizontal bands, top being blue, middle being yellow and lowest being red. It has stars on the top stripe.	
	1917	Flag of the Home Rule Movement	Five red and four green horizontal stripes On the upper left quadrant was the Union Jack, which signified the Dominion status that the movement sought to achieve. A crescent and a star, both in white, are set in top fly. Seven white stars are arranged as in the Saptarishi constellation (the constellation Ursa Major), which is sacred to Hindus.	
	1931–1947	The Swaraj Flag, officially adopted by the Indian National Congress in 1931. Also used by Azad Hind.	Three horizontal strips of saffron, white and green with a blue chakra in the centre.	
