= Krishna Kumar Mitra =

Indian Freedom Fighter

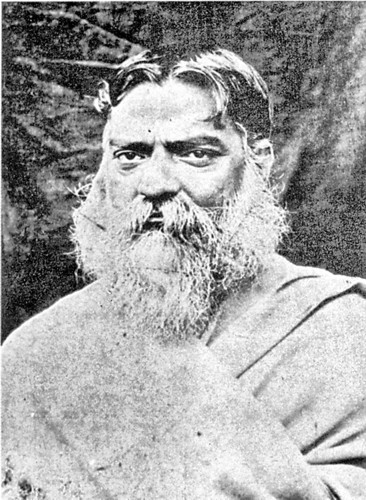
- Born: 1852; Baghil, Mymensingh district, Bengal Presidency
- Died: 1936 (aged 83–84); Calcutta, Bengal Presidency, British India
- Occupations: Indian freedom fighter, journalist and leader of the Brahmo Samaj
- Spouse: Lilabati Devi

Krishna Kumar Mitra (1852–1936) was an Indian freedom fighter, journalist and leader of the Brahmo Samaj. He is remembered for his contributions to the Swadeshi movement through his journal Sanjibani.

== Early life and education ==
Krishna Kumar was born in the village of Baghil in the Mymensingh district (now Tangail district) of Bengal in what is today Bangladesh in 1852. He was a Hindu Kayastha by birth and his father Guruprasad Mitra was a landholder who led an agitation against oppression by British indigo planters.

Krishna Kumar was educated at Mymensingh's Hardinge Vernacular School and the Zilla School and obtained a bachelor's degree from the Scottish Church College in 1876. Subsequently, he studied law at the University of Calcutta for a while.

== Brahmo leader ==
Deeply influenced by his father who was a local Brahmo leader and his schoolteacher Girishchandra Ghosh, Krishna Kumar was inducted into the Brahmo faith in 1869 at the age of 17. He became a member of the Sadharan Brahmo Samaj and his journal Sanjibani became the Samaj's principal mouthpiece. He was elected president of the Sadharan Brahmo Samaj in 1918.

== Career as a journalist ==
Mitra launched his Bengali journal Sanjibani in 1883. In 1886, he published a series of articles on the condition of the Indian workers in the tea plantations of Assam based on investigations by Dwaraknath Ganguly forcing the government to provide legal protection to tea garden workers. The second floor of Mitra's 6, College Square residence served as the office and press for the journal. His nephew Aurobindo Ghosh stayed here during 1909-1910 before escaping to Pondicherry.

== Teaching career ==
Mitra taught at the AM Bose School and College (under the University of Calcutta) in Kolkata from 1879 to 1908 when he resigned from his post as superintendent and professor of history following the colonial government's threat to cancel the college's accreditation if he continued to be associated with the swadeshi movement.

== Political life ==
Mitra joined Surendranath Banerjee's Indian Association in 1876 and became its joint secretary and Banerjee and Mitra traveled across northern India to popularise their political ideas. Mitra was also associated with the Indian National Congress since its inception and was part of its 'moderate' faction in Bengal. In 1890 he joined the indigo cultivators' agitation.

== Swadeshi movement ==
Opposed to the partition of Bengal and influenced by colleagues like Ananda Mohan Bose and Kalishankar Shukul, Mitra joined the anti-Partition Swadeshi movement. He used his journal Sanjibani to rouse public opinion against the partition and on 13 July 1905 he openly called for the boycott of foreign goods through the journal. He attended the Bengal Provincial Conference at Barisal in 1906 where he condemned police atrocities against Swadeshi activists. The same year the Bengal government issued a circular banning the singing of Vande Mataram in any procession or public meeting. Mitra became president of the Anti-Circular Society that was formed to oppose the ban.

For his involvement in the Swadeshi movement, Mitra had to resign from his job as a professor of history and in 1908 was deported from Calcutta for two years by the British authorities.

== Family ==
Mitra married Lilabati Devi, the fourth daughter of Rajnarayan Basu in 1881. At their wedding, conducted in accordance with Brahmo rites, Narendranath Dutta sang two songs that were composed by Rabindranath Tagore for the occasion. Mitra was the maternal uncle of Aurobindo Ghosh and father in law of Sachindra Prasad Bose who unfurled the Calcutta Flag at the Parsi Bagan Square in Calcutta in 1906.

== Social reformer ==
Krishna Kumar Mitra was a dedicated social reformer opposed to idolatry, caste system and the social and religious prejudices in Bengal. He formed a Nari Raksa Samiti to work for the protection of women's rights. He was also an advocate of temperance who strongly criticised the government's decision to establish public drinking houses.

== Books ==
Besides his journalistic pieces in the Sanjibani, Mitra also authored several books including Mahammad-Charita, Buddhadev-Charita and Bauddhadharmer Sangksipta Bibaran. He also wrote an autobiography, Krishna Kumar Mitrer Atma Charit.

== Death and commemoration ==
Krishna Kumar Mitra died in 1936. The Assamese writer Padmanath Gohain Baruah included a short biography of Mitra in his Nithikatha which he wrote as a textbook for school children to "show respect" to "a selfless patriot and deeply religious man [who] Through Sanjibani, a paper which was run and edited by him, the bad luck of the tea garden coolies of Assam were slightly changed".
