= Kanailal Dutta =

Indian revolutionary (1888–1908)

- কানাইলাল দত্ত
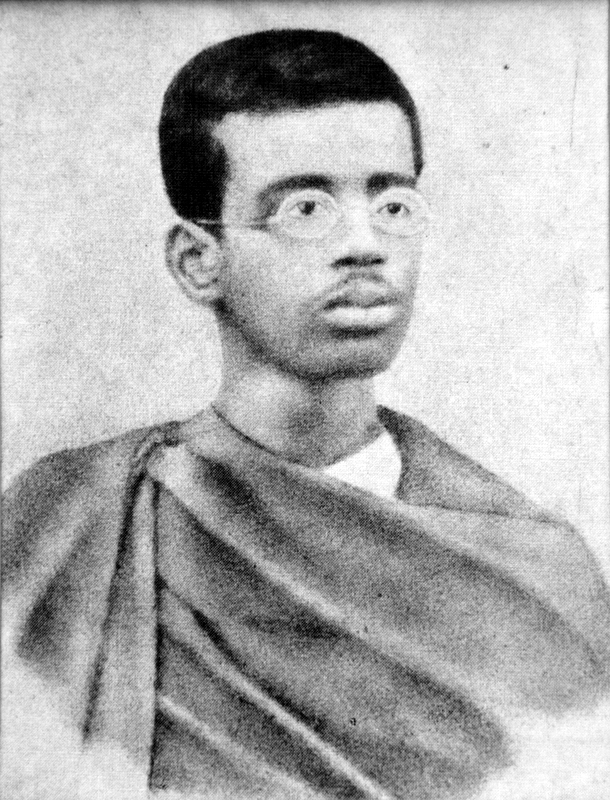
- Born: 30 August 1888; Chandernagore, French India (present-day Chandannagar, Hooghly, West Bengal, India)
- Died: 10 November 1908 (aged 20); Calcutta, Bengal Presidency, British India (present-day Kolkata, West Bengal, India)
- Occupations: Revolutionary, Freedom Fighter
- Organization: Jugantar

Kanailal Dutta (Bengali: কানাইলাল দত্ত; 30 August 1888 – 10 November 1908) was an Indian nationalist involved in the Indian Independence Movement belonging to the Jugantar group. He was born in Chandannagar, West Bengal. He, along with Satyendranath Bose, was convicted by the British for the assassination of Narendranath Goswami, an approver of the British, in the Jail hospital of Alipore Central Jail on 31 August 1908. He was executed in November of that same year.

== Early life ==
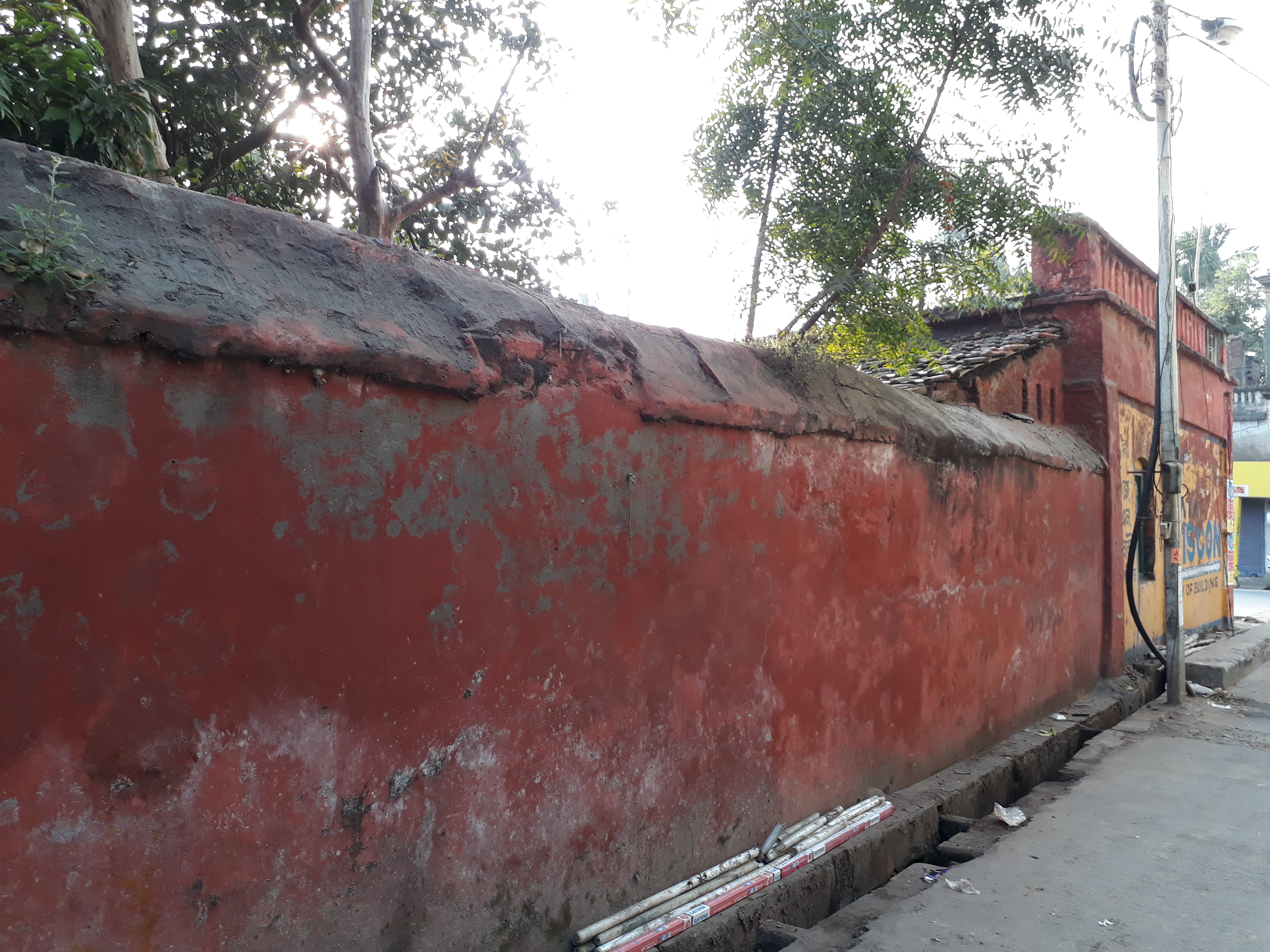
Birthplace of Kanailal Dutta

Kanailal Dutta was born in Chandan Nagar, West Bengal in a weaver (Tanti) family. His father, Chunilal Dutta, was an accountant in Bombay. Kanailal's early school life was started in Girgaon Aryan Education Society School, Bombay and later he came back to Chandannagar and took admission in Duplex College in Chandannagar. In 1908, he appeared BA exam from Hooghly Mohsin College, which was affiliated with the University of Calcutta.

== Revolutionary activities ==
During his early college days, Kanailal met with Charu Chandra Roy, who inspired him to join the revolutionary movement during the agitations against the Partition of Bengal. During 1905 movement against partition of Bengal, Kanailal Dutta was in the forefront from Chandannagar group. He also developed a close connection with the Gondolpara revolutionary group, which was led by Srishchandra Ghosh. In 1908, he moved to Kolkata and joined Kolkata based revolutionary group Jugantar. In Anushilan Samiti at Calcutta, he was trained and guided by Hemchandra Kanungo.

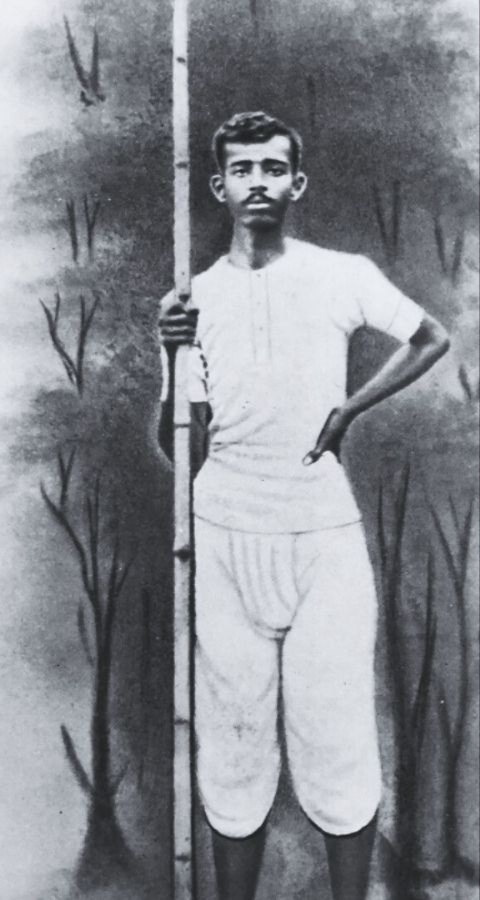
Kanailal Dutt as a student.

Kingsford assassination attempt

Just two days after the Muzaffarpur bomb attack (30 April 1908) aimed at killing Kingsford, the police raided and arrested a number of revolutionaries in Bengal on 2 May 1908. 33 revolutionaries were charged with waging war against the government. Kanailal Dutta was one of these men, who was also arrested on 2 May 1908 and detained in Alipore Jail.

Alipore Bomb Case

Muraripukur Garden House of Barin Ghosh

Police raided premises at 32 Murari Pukur Road at Kolkata on 2 May 1908 and a bomb-factory was discovered as was a cache of arms, a large quantity of ammunition, bombs, detonators and other tools. They also confiscated Revolutionary literature. The raids were being conducted at various places throughout Bengal and Bihar, and more detention was on the move. Aurobindo Ghosh, Barindra Kumar Ghose, Ullaskar Dutt, Indu Bhusan Roy and many others were arrested. During this time one detainee, Narendranath Goswami (aka Norendra Nath Gossain), became approver of the British, and started revealing names of many persons to the police, leading to further arrests.

Goswami was a resident of Srirampur near Chandernagore. He knew all the plans and activities of the revolutionaries. Appearing in the witness box he started implicating many of his former colleagues by mentioning their names. Barin Ghosh, Shanti Ghosh and Ullaskar Dutta's names were mentioned in attempting to blow off the governor's train at Chandernagore station in 1908; referring to the bomb outrage in the Mayor's house he mentioned name of Charu Chandra Roy, being the leader of the revolutionary outfit of Chandernagore; and on 24 June mentioned names of Aurobindo Ghosh and Subodh Chandra Mullick linking to revolutionary activities.

A conspiracy hatched

The under-trial prisoners under the leadership under the advice of Hemchandra Kanungo. Barin Ghosh hatched a plan to escape from the Alipur Central Jail, and also to get rid of Goswami. B.C. Roy, Barrister-at-law, defending the prisoners, offered help with men and arms. Barin wrote letters from jail to Sudhangshu Jiban Rai, Preo Shankar Rai and Basanta Banerjee of Chandernagore to meet B. C. Roy for arrangements of arms. He also wrote to Shrish Chandra Ghosh to send phial, acid for the purpose of throwing to jail wardens and wax to copy keys. On Sunday, 23 August, one revolver was smuggled into the jail by on the request of Hemchandra Kanungo by Shudhangshu Jiban Rai. Next day Hem Kanungo gave it to Satyendranath with instruction to kill Goswami. That time Satyendranath was admitted in the jail Hospital. He expressed his inability to use such a big revolver, and returned it back. On Sunday, 30 August, another revolver reached Barin though Shrish. it was a smaller one. Kanailal took it, and subsequently got admitted to the jail hospital. The Revolvers were received loaded. The stage was set.

Murder of Narendranath Goswami

Kanailal Dutta and Satyen Bosu arrested after murder of Naren Goswami

It was time for retribution for the traitor inside Presidency Jail. The Narendranath, intentionally kept separated from the other prisoners, was confined in the European Ward in Alipore Central Jail. On 31 August 1908, Narerdranath was brought, from that ward, to the Jail Hospital by a European Convict Overseer named Highens. Narendranath had apparently previously arranged to meet, at that time, in the hospital, two fellow prisoners, who were already patients in the Jail Hospital, named Kanailal Dutta and Satyendranath Bose. Kanailal and Satyendra managed to acquire two revolvers secretly. On the request of Hem Kanungo, Shrish Chandra Ghosh of Chandernagore smuggled the revolvers into the jail, assisted by Motilal Roy. Narendranath had apparently been approached by the second of these prisoners, who had pretended that he also wished to make a statement; and his visit was really in order to get this statement. Evidently it was however part of a plot to get Narendranath within striking distance for it appears that almost immediately on Narendranath's arrival on the landing, at the head of the staircase leading to the second story of the hospital, these two prisoners opened fire on him with the two revolvers. Highens the Convict Overseer attempted to arrest one of them and was shot through the wrist. Narendranath although shot in several places was not mortally hit and fled down the stairs, out of the Hospital Compound and along an alley way towards the gate. Kanailal Dutta pursued him and shot him fatally through the back. He was then secured by a Eurasian Prisoner named Linton. (Excerpts from a letter No 1876-C dated 31 August 1908, addressed to The Chief Secretary to the Government of Bengal, Calcutta from Commissioner of Police, Calcutta.

Nine shots fired

Excerpts from the Magistrate's commitment order in the case of murder of Narendranath Goswami (spellings unchanged):

"The two revolvers were brought into the office and examined and the smaller one (Exhibit I) was found to have in the chambers four discharged cartridges while the larger (Exhibit II) had five discharged cartridges and one loaded cartridge. Thus we may assume that in all nine shots were fired. Four bullets were found — two inside the dispensary, one just outside the dispensary, and one was extracted from the dead body of Norendra. From the medical evidence it appears that this was the bullet which caused Norendra’s death. It entered fairly high up in the back and severed the spinal cord and almost completely penetrated the breast in front but spent its force before doing so and lay imbedded under the skin of the breast. Exhibit VII is this bullet (contained in a glass bottle sealed by Captain Daley). An examination of this bullet shows that it was fired from the larger of the two revolvers (Exhibit II). The evidence of Linton shows that the revolver was the one used by Kanai Lall Dutt. Thus the fatal shot was fired by Kanai Lall Dutt."

== Trial, sentencing and martyrdom ==
On 5 September 1908 the news paper Indu Prakash made the following observation:

"The Bengal anarchists were perhaps the most romantic lot in the whole anarchist world, and in point of bravery, daredevilry and cunning they were no doubt far ahead of Russian and Spanish desperadoes - quick in action, quick in revenge and smart in getting rid of any approver."

On 21 October 1908, the High Court pronounced its judgment by giving sentence of death to both the accused. Kanailal declined to file an appeal against such order. Kanailal offered no defense and was averse to an appeal. Sir Prafulla Chandra Roy on a later date commented that Kanailal taught the Bengalees the proper use of "shall" and "will", pointing to his sense of English grammar. When the question of an appeal came up, Kanailal simply said, 'There shall be no appeal'. It was the use of "shall" in the imperative.

Kanailal's statement to the District Magistrate about his motive for assassinating Naren was touchingly direct and simple:

"I wish to state that I did kill him. I do not wish to give any statement why I killed him. Wait, I do wish to give a reason. It was because he was a traitor to his country."

The sentence was carried on 10 November 1908, and Kanailal was hanged till death in the Alipore Jail at about seven in the morning.

In the trial of Satyendranath, the Sessions Judge, disagreeing with the majority verdict of the jury, referred the case to the High Court and there Satyendranath was convicted and sentenced to death. He was hanged on 21 November 1908.

An account of a Jail Warden: Charu Chandra Roy recalled the account of a British jail warden, who, on 9 November 1908, a day before the day of hanging, saw Kanailal smiling, and said, "You are smiling now, but tomorrow morning all the smiles will disappear from your lips." The next day when Kanailal was brought to the gallows he saw the warden, and asked him smilingly, "How do you find me now?" The warden had no answer. Later, the warden told Charu Chandra Roy, "I am the sinner who has executed Kanailal. If you have a hundred men like him, your aim will be fulfilled."

About fifteen years after the death of Kanailal, Motilal Roy published a memorial booklet on Kanailal Dutta in Bengali from Chandarnagore town, which was under French occupation that time and beyond British jurisdiction. It was immediately banned by the British under Sea Customs Act of 1878 which prohibited any "objectionable materials" from being transported into British territories. In that book Motilal recalled the sight of Kanilal's body on the funeral pyre:

"As soon as the blanket was carefully removed, what did we see - language is wanting to describe the lovely beauty of the ascetic Kanai - his long hair fell in a mass on his broad forehead, the half-closed eyes were still drowsy as though from a test of nectar, the living lines of resolution were manifest in the firmly closed lips, the hands reaching to the knees were closed in fists. It was wonderful! Nowhere on Kanai's limbs did we find any ugly wrinkle showing the pain of death.."

On the day of cremation of Kanailal in the Kalighat burning ghat, his body was handed over to his family for cremation. A huge crowd gathered and all were pushing each other to touch the bier. The body was decked with flowers. Men, women and children followed the procession in large numbers, shouting Jai Kanai occasionally. He gloried in the deed he had committed and went to his execution without flinching. While fleeing from Muzaffarpur, on 2 May 1908, Prafulla Chaki was cornered at Mokama Ghat railway station and was about to get arrested when he killed himself by firing two shots one at the forehead and the other on the left side of his chest at the head.

== Bibliography ==
- Bose, Bejai Krishna (1910), The Alipore Bomb Case - Mr. Beachcrofts Judgment, Calcutta: M N Mitra
- Ghosh, Durba (2017), Gentlemanly Terrorist - Political Violence and the Colonial State in India, 1919-1947, Cambridge University Press, ISBN 978-110-718-666-8
- Heehs, Peter (2008), The Lives of Sri Aurobindo (Second ed.), Columbia University Press
- Huda, Nurul (2008), The Alipore Bomb Case: A Historic Pre-Independence Trial, Neogy Books, ISBN 978-81-8973-831-0
- Miles, William FS (1995), Imperial Burdens- Counter Colonialism in Former French India, Lynne Rienner Publishers, p. 162, ISBN 978-1-55587-511-4
- Mohanta, Sambaru Chandra (2012), "Dutta, Kanailal", in Islam, Sirajul; Jamal, Ahmed A. (eds.), Banglapedia: National Encyclopedia of Bangladesh (Second ed.), Asiatic Society of Bangladesh, archived from the original on 23 October 2016
- Roy, Motilal (1923), Kanailal, Calcutta: Prabartak Publishers
- Sarkar, Hemanta Kumar (1923), Revolutionaries of Bengal : their methods and ideals, Calcutta: The Author
- Sen, Shailendra Nath (2012), Chandernagore - From Bondage to Freedom 1900-1955, Primus Books, ISBN 978-93-80607-23-8
- Tailleur, Georges (1947), Chandernagore ou le let de Dupleix - in Affaires Politiques, Paris: AOM
- Sengupta, Subodh Ch.; Basu, Anjali (2002), Sansad Bengali Charitavidhan (Bengali) Vol I, Kolkata: Sahitya Sansad, pp. 80, 390, ISBN 81-85626-65-0
