= United Industrial Bank =

Indian banking organization

United Industrial Bank (UIB) was founded in Calcutta in 1940 by Jadunath Ray. In 1989 Allahabad Bank acquired it in a rescue.

In 1963 UIB acquired two banks. One was the Prabartak Bank, which the Prabartak Sangha movement had founded in Calcutta on 17 September 1929 as the Prabartak Bank and Insurance Company. At one point Prabartak Bank had a branch in Chittagong. The other was the Bank of Bankura, which had been established in Calcutta on 8 June 1936.

In 1964 United Industrial Bank acquired two more banks: Metropolitan Bank on 6 February, and Southern Bank on 24 August. Both Southern and Metropolitan Bank had been established in Calcutta, Southern on 10 October 1934, and Metropolitan on 16 October 1936.

In 1965 the Government of East Pakistan took over UIB's branch in East Pakistan.

At the time of its merger into Allahabad Bank, United Industrial had 145 branches.
