= Shrish Chandra Ghosh =

Indian Independence Activist (1887-1941)

Shrish Chandra Ghosh (1887 – 2 May 1941) was a Bengali revolutionary and Indian independence activist.

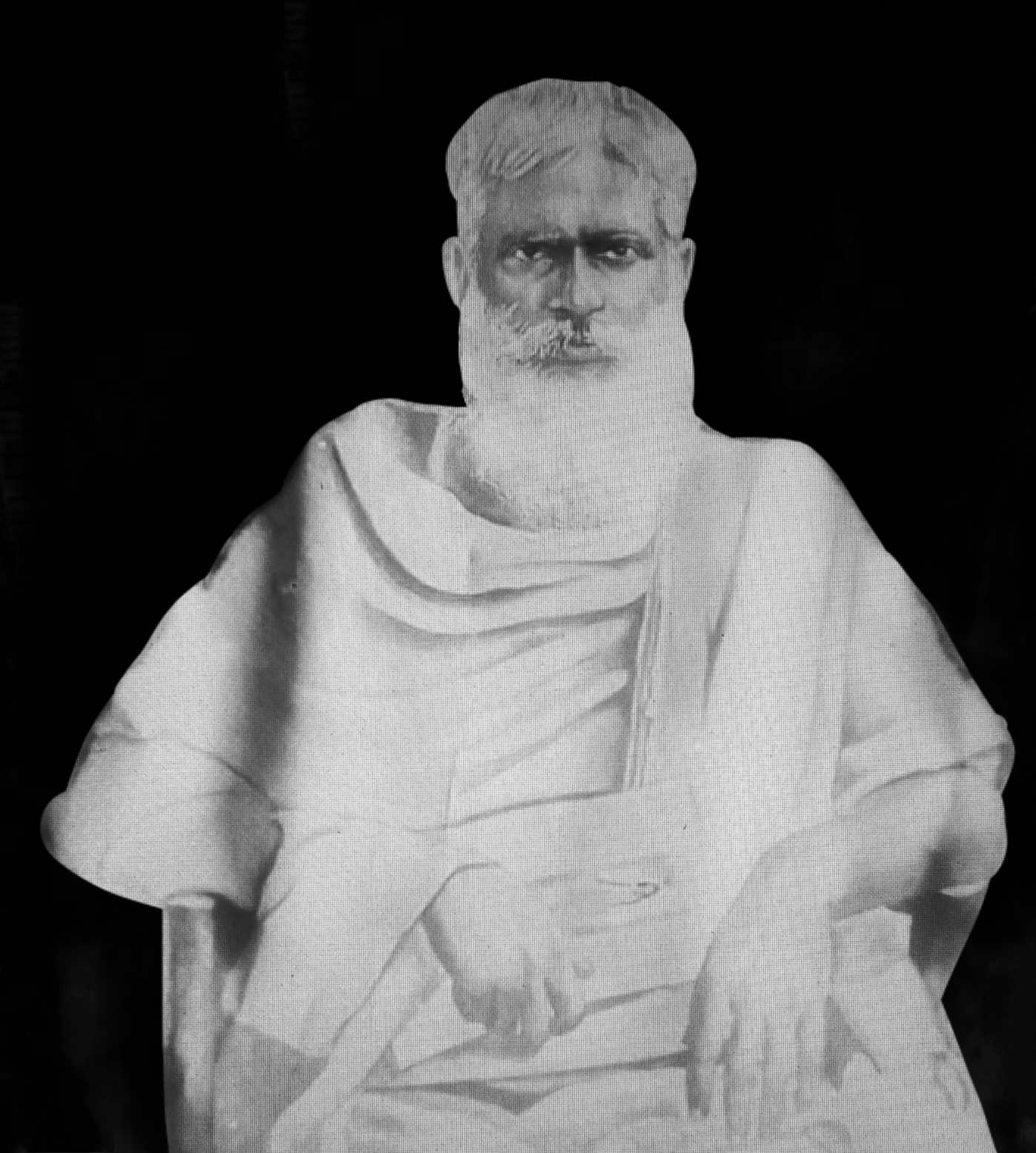
Srish ghosh

== Early life ==
Shrish Chandra was born to Birajkrishna and Mahamaya in 1887, he hailed from the Subaldaha village, Burdwan district. His early education was completed at Subaldaha village pathsala (presently Rashbehari Bose F.P School). He studied in the Dupleix College (presently Chandernagore Government College) and befriended with Ras Bihari Bose. Both were inspired by Professor Charuchandra Roy, a nationalist teacher of Chandannagar. Ghosh passed entrance examination in 1905 but due to financial incapacity he left college and join in a temporary work in Hitabadi magazine.

== Revolutionary activities ==
Ghosh participated in the movement against Partition of Bengal (1905) and joined in various revolutionary work. While working in Hitabadi magazine he met Indian nationalist leader Sakharam Ganesh Deuskar. Ghosh learnt manufacturing of bomb in Maniktala, Kolkata and suggested Ras Bihari to assassinate Viceroy Lord Charles Hardinge. He was associated with number of revolutionary activities. He attempted to assassinate Tardival, Mayor of Chandernagore, handed over a revolver to Kanailal Dutta in Alipore Central Jail to kill the approver Naren Gnoswami and also attached with Rodda company arms heist. As per instruction of Ras Bihari Bose he made liaison among the revolutionaries of various state. Ghosh roamed all over the India to reorganise the freedom movement under the leadership of Bose and returned safely to Chandannagar, French territory, where the British police could not track him down. Ghosh made arrangements of safe house of Aurobindo Ghosh in 1910, and number of other revolutionaries with the help of Motilal Roy, another senior freedom fighter of the Chandannagar group.

== Arrest ==
British police and intelligence repeatedly failed to arrest him. British authorities had appealed to the French administration of Chandannagar to expel him. Police commissioner Charles Tegart identified him as one of the most dangerous person. Finally in 1915, police arrest in Howrah Station while he was accompanying his cousin sister to the home of her in-laws.

== Death ==
After his release he devoted himself into constructive work of Prabartak Sangha. But due to the set back of the armed uprising he became frustrated. After suffering from poverty and persecution, he lost his mental balance and committed suicide on 2 May 1941 by consuming opium.
