= Manindra Nath Nayak =

Indian independence activist (1897-1982)

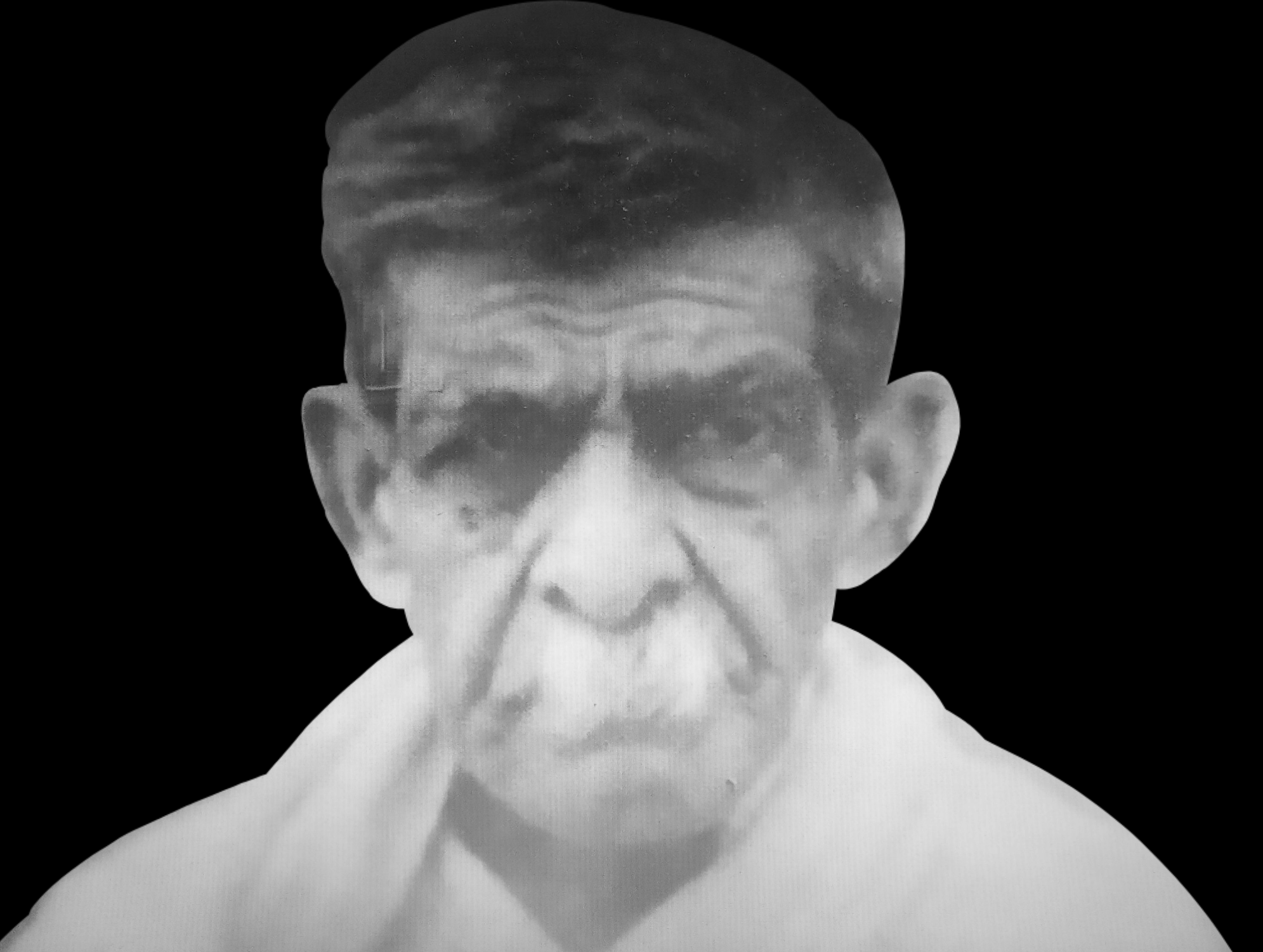
- Manindranath Nayek
- Born: 30 June 1897; Chandernagore, French India (now in West Bengal, India)
- Died: 28 December 1982 (aged 85)
- Occupations: revolutionary, activist

Manindra Nath Nayak (30 June 1897 – 28 December 1982) was a Bengali revolutionary and Indian independence activist.

== Early life ==
Nayak was born in a Mahishya family, in the house of his maternal uncle, Rajendranath Nandy at Ghorapukurdhar in Chandannagar, Hooghly district in French India. His father name was Bhushan Chandra Nayak. Manidra Nath was the first science graduated person of Chandannnagar. He passed B.Sc. from Scottish Church College in 1913 but could not enter in Presidency College Calcutta for pursuing M.Sc. due to police report citing his revolutionary activities.

== Revolutionary activities ==
He was attracted to the revolutionary politics and member of secret society from student life. Nayak learnt to manufacture bombs by putting explosives in the empty shell of coconut even before Manicktala Conspiracy case. After that he was trained by Mr. Suresh Chandra Dutta, Professor of Ripon College, Calcutta to prepare improvised explosives. Rash Behari Bose sent bombs prepared by him to Lahore, and Delhi in 1912. The historic bomb used by Basanta Kumar Biswas which wounded Lord Hardinge, was made by him. Since he was a resident of Chandannagar, a French territory, British police could not ever arrest him. Nayak also took care of the arms collected in Rodda company arms heist.

== Aftermath ==
In 1919 he became the member of French India Legislative Assembly and went to Pondicherry conference in 1920. Nayak developed close relation with Sri Aurobindo and kept regular contact with him. He also attached with the social works organised by Prabartak Sangha and became editor of Prabartak magazine started by Motilal Roy.
