= Sachindra Prasad Bose =

Indian independence movement activist

Sachindra Prasad Bose (Bengali: শচীন্দ্র প্রসাদ বসু) (died February 1941) was an Indian independence movement activist and follower of Sir Surendranath Banerjee. He was the son-in-law of the moderate Brahmo leader, Krishna Kumar Mitra.

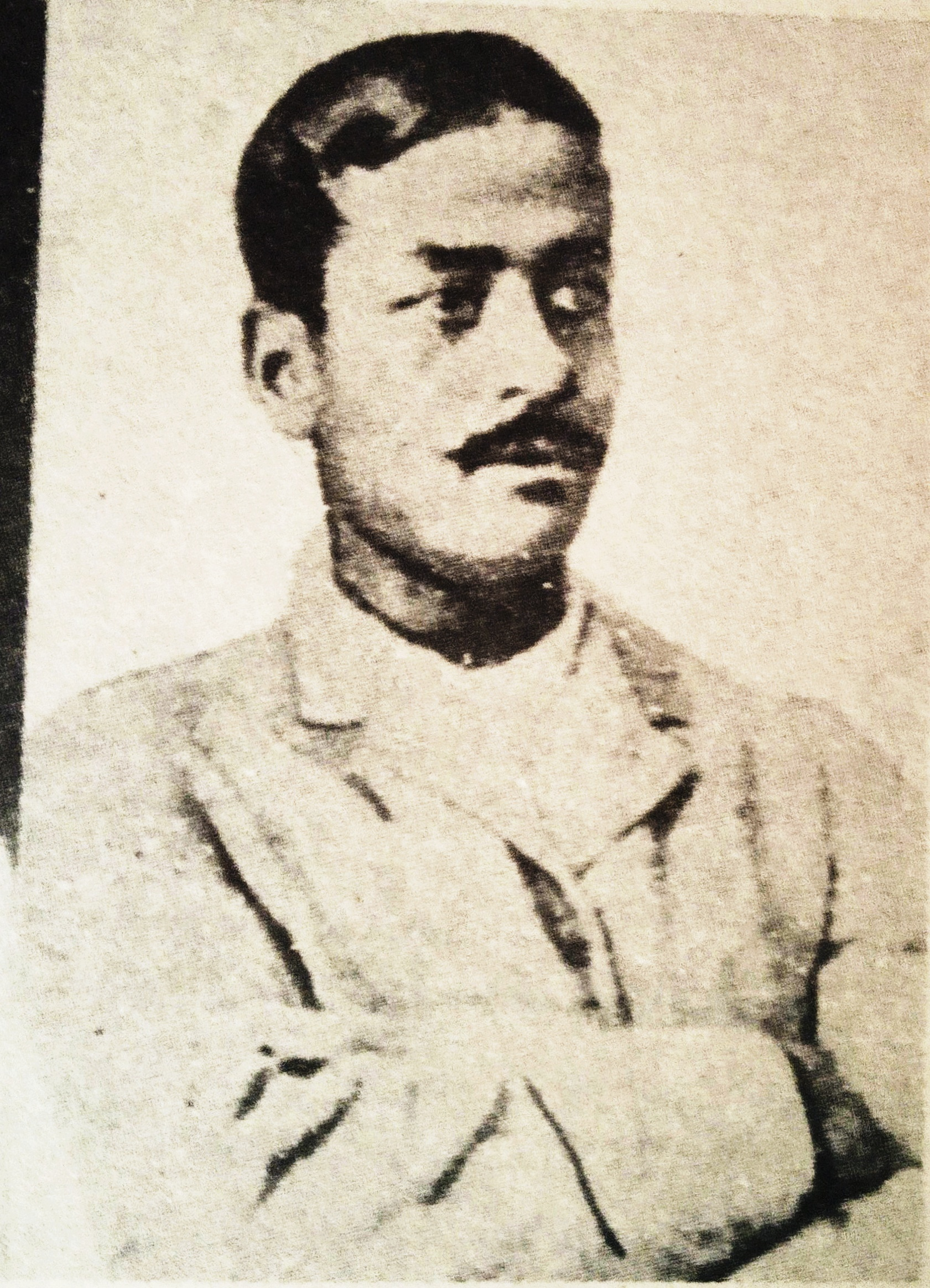
Sachindra Prasad Bose

Calcutta flag, designed by Bose and Hemchandra Kanungo

On 4 November 1905, when he was a fourth year student of Ripon College, Calcutta, he took initiative to form the Anti-Circular Society in protest against the circular issued by R. W. Carlyle, then Chief Secretary of the Government of Bengal instructing Magistrates and Collectors to take stern measures against students involved in politics. He became its secretary and Krishna Kumar Mitra became its president.

He, along with Hemchandra Kanungo, designed and unfurled the Calcutta Flag on 7 August 1906 in Parsi Bagan Square (Greer Park) in Calcutta, India. In 1908, he was arrested and sent to the Rawalpindi jail. After his release, he worked as the editor of a magazine named Vyavsa O Vanijya.
