= Hemchandra Kanungo =

Indian revolutionary, writer and artist (1871–1951)

Biplabi Dronacharya Hemchandra Kanungo
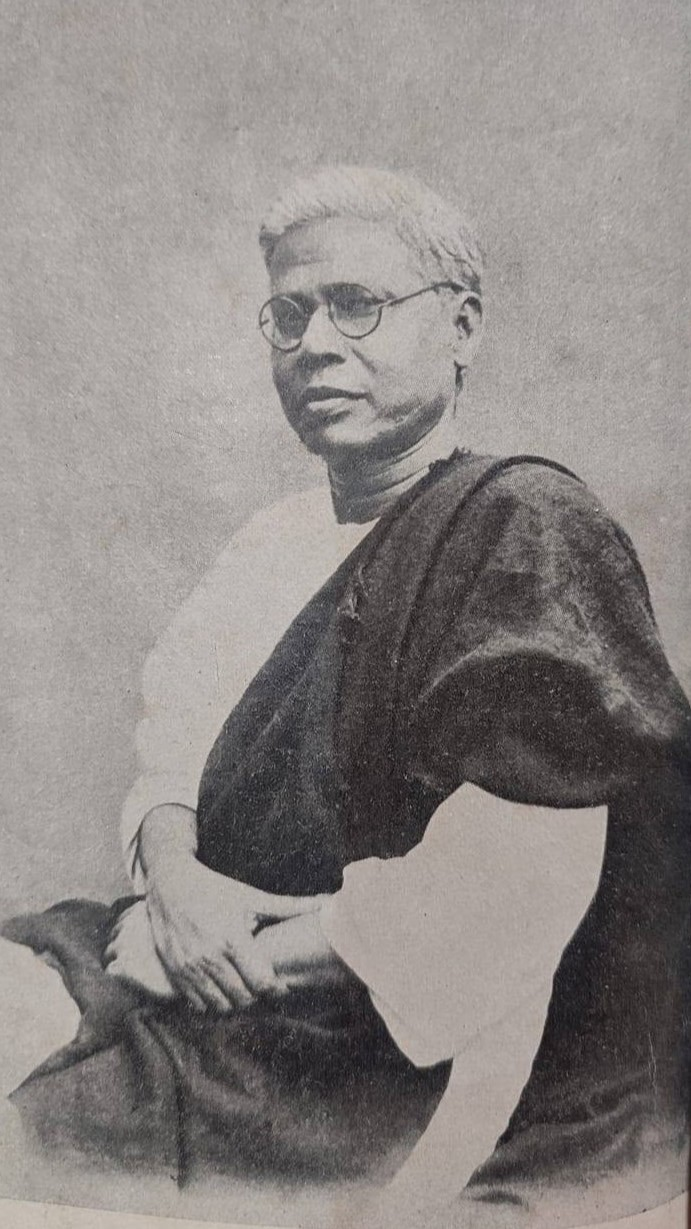
- Hemchandra Das Kanungo
- Born: Hemchandra Das Kanungo; August 4, 1871; Radhanagar, Midnapur District, British India (now in Belda, West Bengal, India)
- Died: April 8, 1951 (aged 79); Midnapore, West Bengal, India
- Other name: Biplabi Dronacharya
- Education: Midnapore Town School
- Alma mater: Calcutta College of Art
- Organization(s): Anushilan Samiti, India House, Paris Indian Society, Jugantar
- Known for: Indian Freedom movement, Anushilan Samiti, Jugantar
- Notable work: Account of the revolutionary movement in Bengal (Banglay Biplabi Prochesta), Towards the great years to come (Onagata Sudiner Torey)
- Movement: Indian independence movement
- Spouse: Sarat Kumari Debi (m. 1887)

Hemchandra Das Kanungo (4 August 1871 – 8 April 1951) was an Indian nationalist and a member of the Anushilan Samiti. Kanungo travelled to Paris in 1907, where he learnt the technique of assembling picric acid bombs from exiled Russian revolutionaries. Kanungo's knowledge was disseminated throughout Indian nationalist organisations in the British Raj and abroad. In 1908, Kanungo was one of the principal co-accused with Aurobindo Ghosh in the Alipore Bomb Case (1908–09). He was sentenced to transportation for life in the Andamans, but was released in 1921. He was given the honorific sobriquet of, "Biplabi Dronacharya" (Dronacharya for the revolutionaries) by Kazi Nazrul Islam himself. For the crucial mentorship that he had provided to many fledging revolutionaries of the time. He has been widely regarded as the most prominent figure in the early phase of the revolutionary movement.

He was probably the first revolutionary from India who went abroad to obtain military and political training. He obtained training from the Russian emigre in Paris. He returned to India in January 1908. He opened a secret bomb factory for the Anushilon Samiti at Maniktala near Kolkata, founder members of which were Hemchandra Kanungo, Aurobindo Ghosh (Sri Aurobindo) and his brother, Barindra Kumar Ghosh. He was also one of the founders of the Jugantar party which was the central association of revolutionary independence activists in Bengal. He also contributed his writings on the revolutionary movement to the Jugantar Patrika in order to inspire more youths. He was one of the creators of the Calcutta flag, based on which the first flag of independent India was raised by Bhikaiji Cama on 22 August 1907 at the International Socialist Conference in Stuttgart, Germany.

== Early life ==
Born in an aristocratic Mahishya family to Pandit Kshetramohun Das Kanungo and Komalkamini Debi of Radhanagar village, in Belda of the Medinipur district. His ancestor Madan Mohan Das had migrated from Chari village in Jajpur district in Odisha to present-day Paschim Medinipur. The earliest recorded ancestor of the family was Raghabram Das. Their original surname was Das, they received the title Kanungo for their command of the subjects of Nyaya and their acumen in surveying of the royal lands of different Kings of Utkala. His father Kshetramohun was a scholar of philosophy and astronomy, and his mother Komalkamini was the sister of Raja Kali Prasanna Singha Gajendra Mohapatra of the Khandrui Royal family.

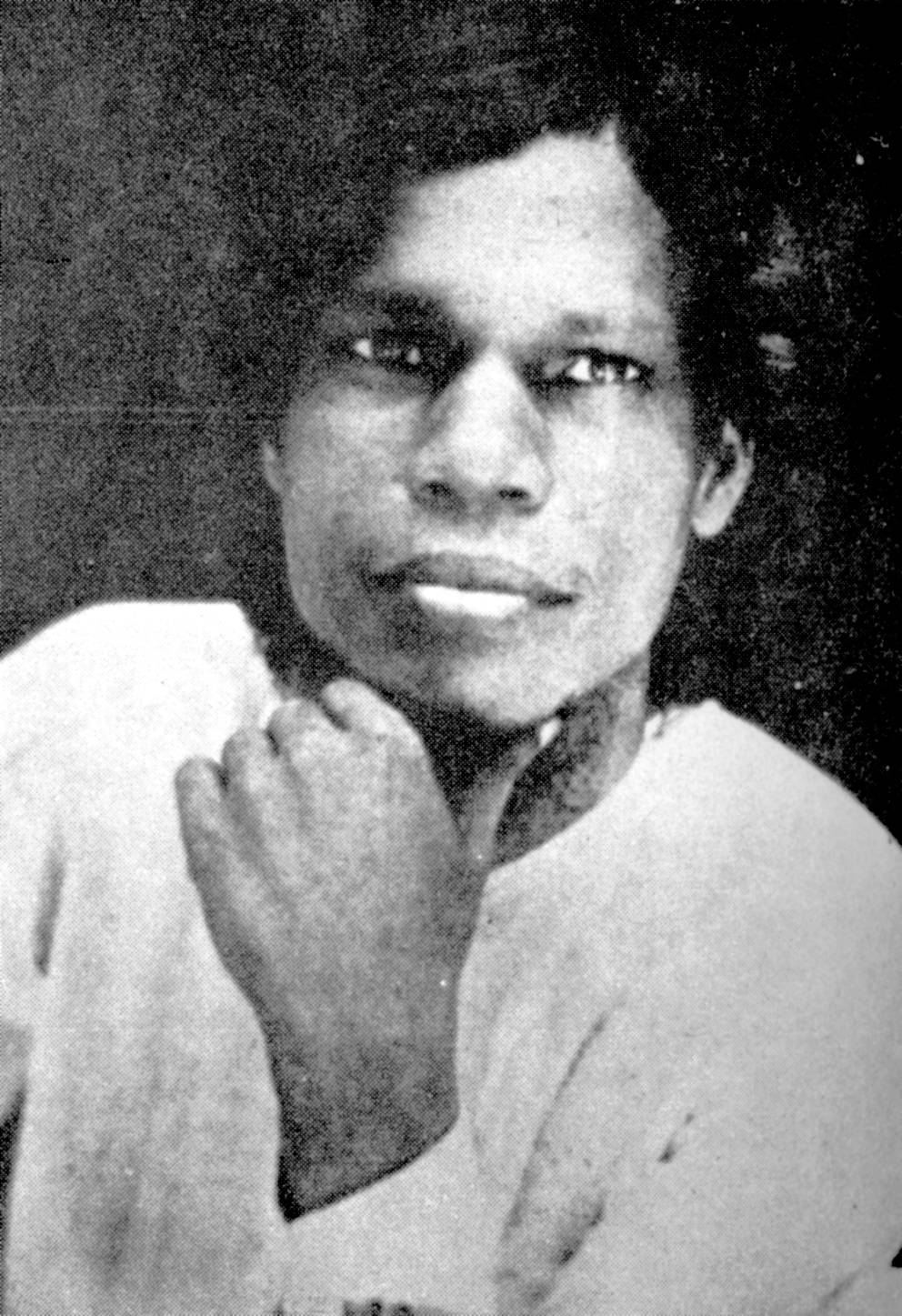
A young Hem Chandra Kanungo

He started his education from Boromohunpur M.I. School and then subsequently shifted to the prestigious Midnapore Town School in the 6th Class. He passed the Entrance examination from Midnapore Town School; then shifted to First Arts class of Midnapore College, but soon changed his mind and took admission into the Campbell Medical Hospital in Calcutta to become a doctor. With an inborn passion for art, he left his medical studies and entered the Calcutta art college to study fine arts. Abruptly discontinuing his studies, he returned home to work as an art teacher in his school for some time followed by his joining the District Board.

== Career as a teacher ==
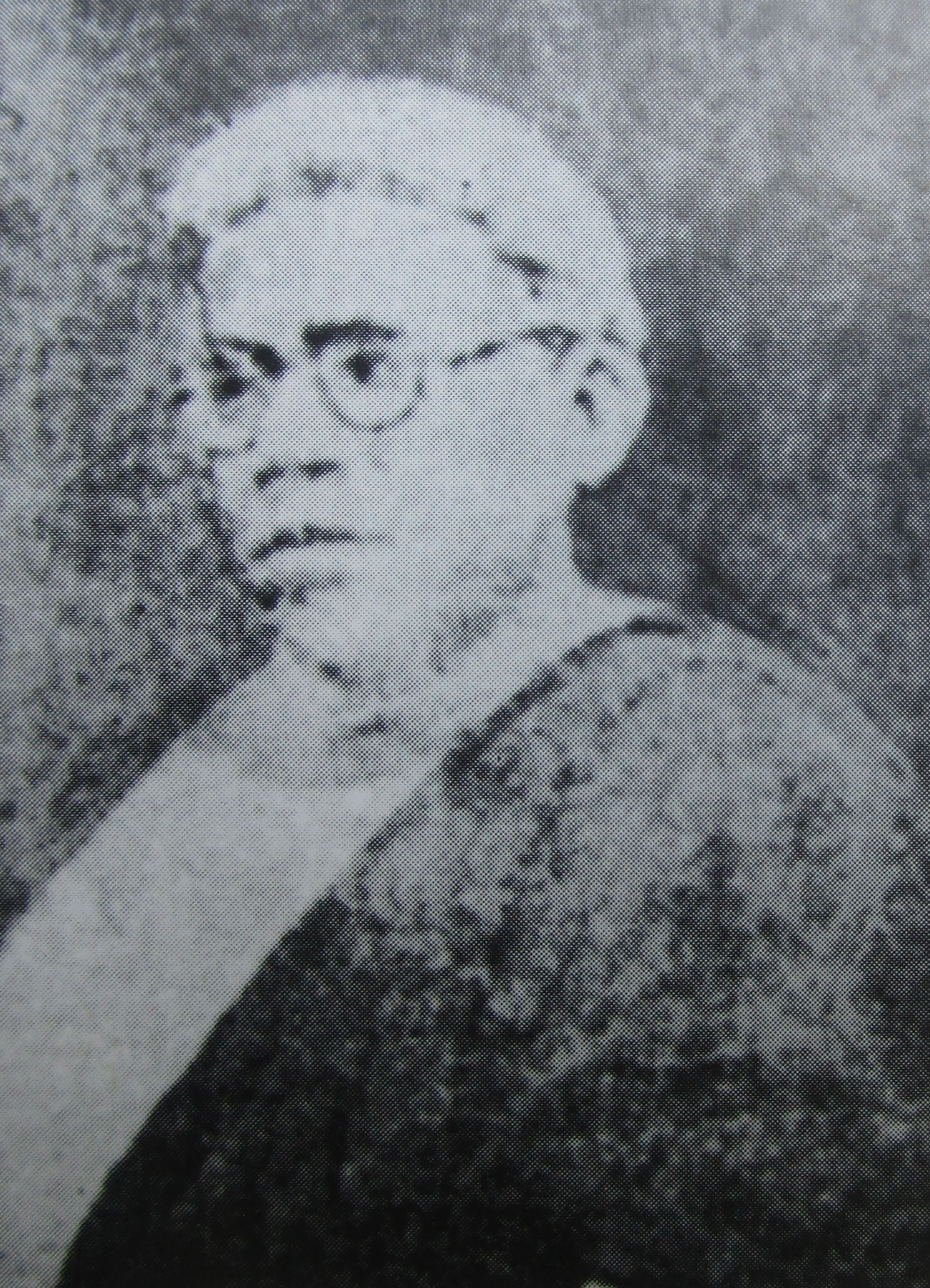
As a teacher at the Midnapore Collegiate School

After completing his studies in Art, he returned to Midnapore and joined the Midnapore College as a demonstrator in its Chemistry department. Simultaneously, he joined the Midnapore Collegiate School as its art teacher. He was instrumental for igniting the revolutionary fervour in the school’s early pupils. Midnapore town, by itself being a hotbed for revolutionary activities. He was greatly inspired by the school's former principal Rajnarayan Basu. During this time, he also became involved in teaching art to village kids free of cost. He subsequently left teaching to join the Medinipur district board as a surveyor.

== Anushilan Samity (Midnapore) ==
During his time at the Midnapore Collegiate School, he was introduced to Ganendranath Basu by Rajnarayan. He was inspired by Ganendranath to join the revolutionary movement and to lay the foundations of the Anushilan Samity of Midnapore, during this time he greatly motivated by Bankim Chandra Chattopadhyay’s works, especially Ananda Math. In 1902, he once again travelled to Calcutta and in the presence of Arobindu Ghosh he joined the newly formed Anushilan Samity, and took an oath with a talwar in hand, in front of the goddess Kali. It was a custom in the early years of the Samity to exclusively take revolutionary oath in Sanskrit, but by Hemchandra’s clear logic, Arobindu made a rare exception in his case and allowed him to take the oath in Bengali instead.

In 1902, he was nominated to organize the Midnapore chapter of the Anushilan Samity. In 1903, he laid the foundations of the Midnapore branch of the Anushilan Samity in Midnapore town. He rented a house with the aid of his maternal uncle Raja Kali Prasanna Gajendra Mohapatra of Turka Raj, and transformed it into an institute of physical culture. Essentially, an akhara where he began to teach young men in stick-wielding, swordplay and wrestling. The said Akhara was inaugurated by Sister Nivedita herself, during her visit to Midnapore. He also utilised his maternal house Turka Raj’s palace grounds, to train the youths that he had recruited. Khudiram Bose himself was one of his early recruits. He also recruited some of the other great revolutionaries like Kanailal Dutta and Satyendranath Basu.

== Revolutionary activities ==
=== Early Activities ===
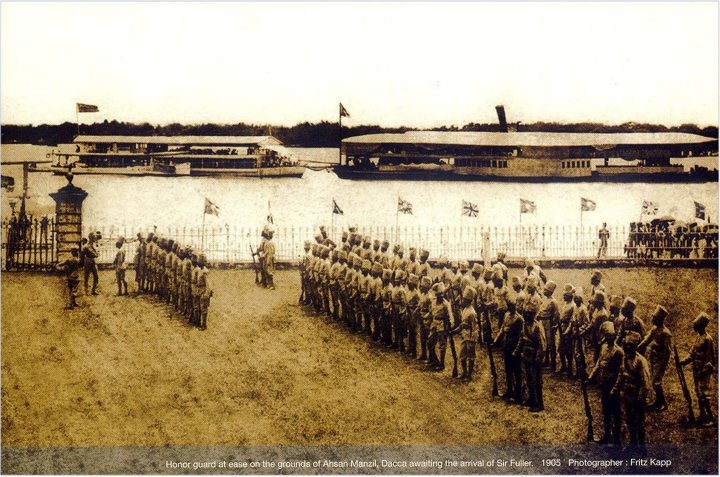
Sir Bampfylde Fuller arrives at Dhaka

In 1905, he along with Barindra Kumar Ghosh, took the responsibility of assassinating the oppressive Governor of East Bengal, Bampfylde Fuller at Shillong. However, just before the planned assassination date, a member inadvertently injured himself, hence inhibiting the attempt. Meanwhile, Fuller had left Shillong for Barishal. Another attempt was made at Barishal, which also failed. Subsequent attempts to assassinate Fuller at Dhaka and Rangpur also failed. These early unsuccessful attempts made it clear to Hem Chandra that a more precise and professional approach to the revolutionary movement was necessary for it to be of any success. Furthermore, superior Bomb manufacturing and rifle training was also requisite in order to stand a chance against the mighty British Empire, which the Russian and Irish revolutionaries apparently were in possession off. This was one of the motivations for him to leave for Europe.

=== Journey to Europe ===
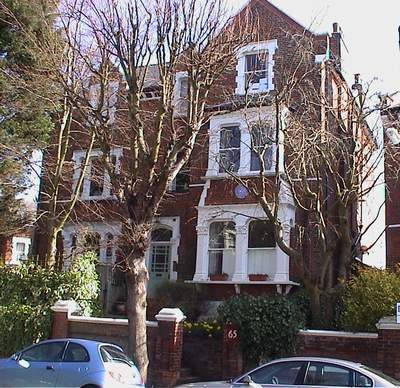
India House in London in the present day

Initially, he intended to pursue the modern art of weoponry in the United States, the Jugantar group already had certain connections there. But this couldn't somehow materialize. Hemachandra decided that what was needed was technical know-how, and he went to Europe to get it. He sold his house in Calcutta to arrange money for the trip. He was also financially aided by his maternal uncle Raja Kali Prasanna Singha Gajendra Mohapatra of Turkagarh and also by Raja Narendra Lal Khan of Narajole. Arriving in Marseille toward the end of 1906, he joined a group of expatriated Indians who had formed an organisation called the "Paris Indian Society". However, during this time his already strained finances got exhausted. He spent a few months trying to get in contact with revolutionaries, or people who knew revolutionaries, in Switzerland, France, and England. During this ordeal, he was fortunately spotted by Shyamji Krishna Varma, who immediately welcomed him to his India House, at London. This, he consequently he left Paris for London. There he came into contact with other revolutionaries already in London in pursuit of their own studies or in actuality, in the pursuit of revolution, like Vinayak Damodar Savarkar, Madan Lal Dhingra and Har Dayal.

=== Return to Paris ===
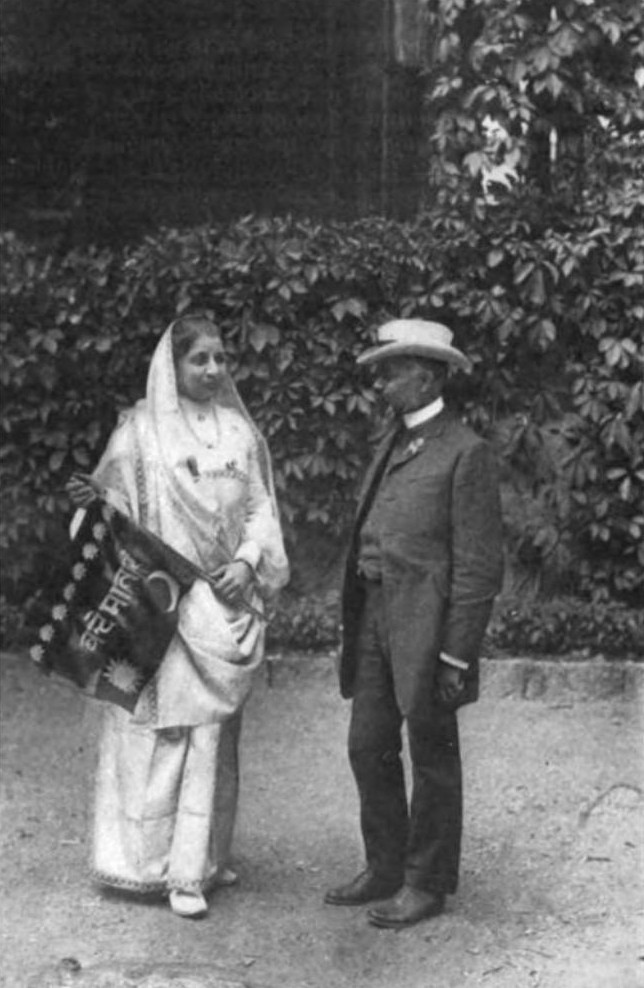
Bhikaji Cama and S. R. Rana with the flag at the International Socialist Conference in Stuttgart

Finally, he found a backer to support him while he studied chemistry in Paris in the form of Madam Cama herself. He became an editor for her mouthpice the journal, called "Anarchy". During this time, he came into contact with certain Russian revolutionaries exiled in Paris. He was also helped a lot by S. R. Rana . He also joined the Russian Bolshevik Party in 1907. Bhikaiji Cama introduced Joseph Albert, known as Libertad, to Hemchandra and his friend Pandurang Bapat in July 1907. She also helped them establish a Chemical laboratory at Paris. He also accompanied Bhikaiji Cama on 22 August 1907 at the International Socialist Conference in Stuttgart, Germany, where she delivered her famous speech, and the flag that she had unfurled at the conference was drawn by Hemchandra. With the help of a female anarchist, apparently Emma Goldman, they were admitted to a party headed by a mysterious Russian known as Ph.D, later identified as Nicholas Safranski. During the latter part of 1907, the two Indians studied history, geography, economics, socialism, communism, and finally, the subjects they had come to learn - explosive chemistry and revolutionary organization. Kanungo utilised his photography skills in taking pictures of the bomb manuals and later Bapat, took the help of a Russian student studying Medicine at Berlin to help them translate the photographs of the bomb making manual.

=== Return to India ===
Hemchandra returned from Europe with a trunk full of up-to-date technical literature, the most important item of which was a seventy-page manual on bomb-making, translated from the Russian. Hemchandra had not intended to join forces with Barindra, but after a talk with Sri Aurobindo, agreed to cooperate.

32 Muraripukur garden house, in the Manicktolla suburbs of Calcutta. This served as the headquarters of Hem Kanungo, Barin Ghosh, and their associates.

A suicide squad of two members was sent to kill Kingsford at Muzaffarpur. After bombing at wrong target, Prafulla Chaki committed suicide before the British Indian Police detained him alive but Khudiram Bose didn't do so and the Police arrested him. As a result of this incident, the covert bomb factory established by Hemchandra was raided by the British Police and shut down. Almost all of the members were arrested in a short period of time.

== Arrest & Andamans ==
=== Arrest and Alipore Bomb trial ===
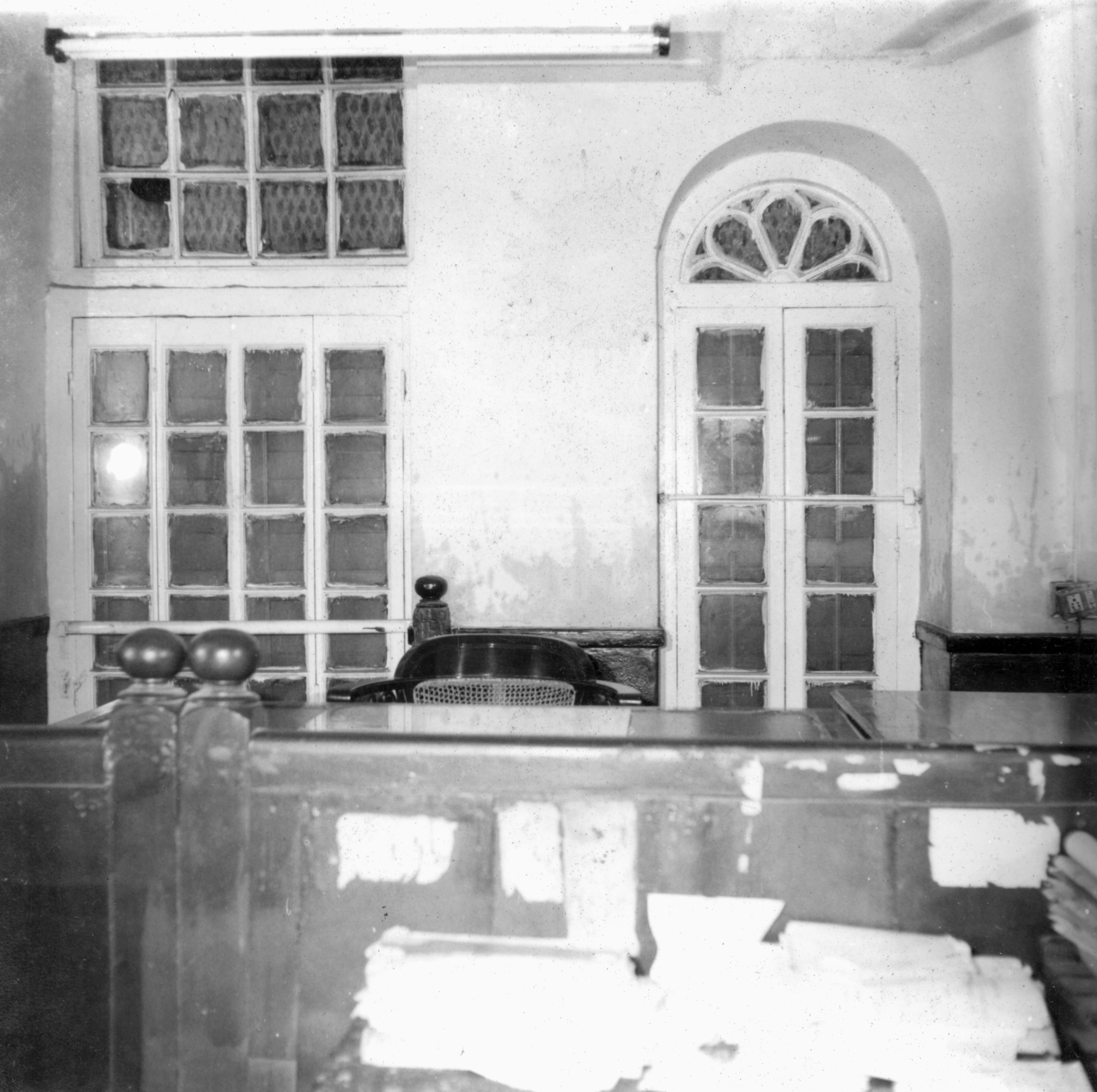
The trial room where the infamous trial took place

The Alipore Bomb Case saw the trial of a number of Indian nationalists from the Anushilan Samiti in Calcutta on charges of revolutionary activity. Kanungo was listed as one of the principal co-accused alongside Aurobindo Ghosh. The activities exposed during the trial centered around the Manicktolla garden house, which served as a secret laboratory and hub for the preparation of explosives. Kanungo was arrested along with several others, including Barindra Kumar Ghosh, and Ullaskar Dutta. The trial became a landmark event, not only because of the high-profile accused but also due to the colonial government’s attempt to portray revolutionary nationalism as a criminal conspiracy against the British Raj. The evidence presented during the trial, including the recovery of bomb-making materials, directly implicated those involved in the technical aspects, of which Kanungo was the foremost expert.

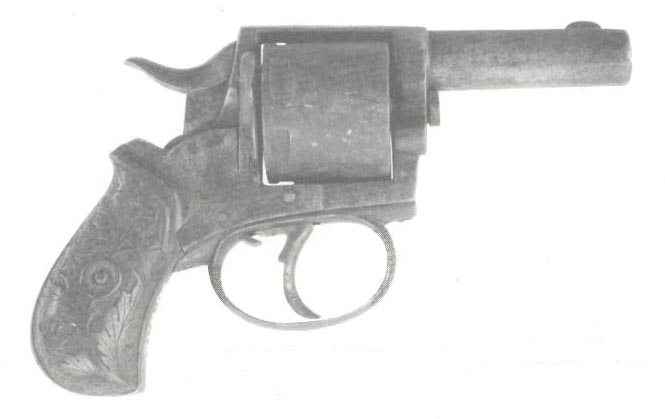
The revolver used by Kanailal Dutta to silence Narendra Goswami was smuggled in by Hem Kanungo

Kanungo's involvement extended even to events that unfolded during the trial period. He was instrumental in the plan to kill Narendra Goswami, who became an approver (King's witness) in the case while in Alipore jail. Hemchandra was reported to have provided the gun used by Satyendranath Basu and Kanailal Dutta to eliminate Goswami within the jail premises. This act, while adding a dramatic and defiant layer to the conspiracy, further cemented the image of the revolutionaries' determined resistance.

=== In Cellular Jail ===
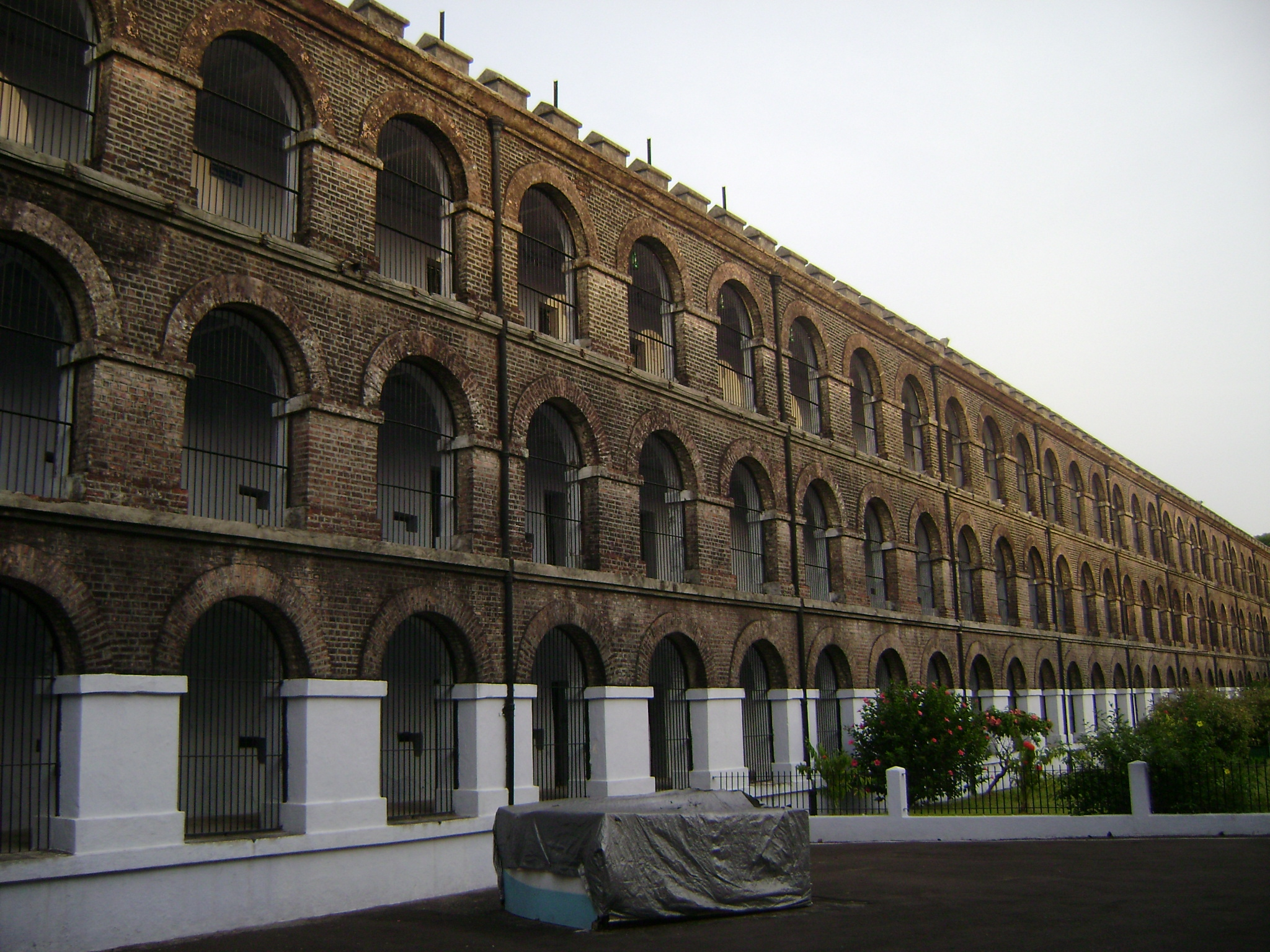
The Cellular Jail also called Kala Pani for its location

In consequence, he was sentenced to transportation for life following his involvement in the Alipore Bomb Case. This sentence led him to the infamous Cellular Jail in the Andamans, a prison known for its exceptionally severe and dehumanizing conditions. Along with other revolutionaries, he endured an isolated existence; the jail's design intentionally prevented communication between inmates, effectively keeping them in solitary confinement. The harsh regime included subjecting prisoners to months of shackles or chains while forcing them to perform rigorous labor, such as manually operating the oil press machines. His time in the "Kala Pani" was an immense personal trial that severely impacted his health. During this time, he again came into contact with V. D. Sarvarkar, and many other revolutionaries he had met abroad. He also, met some of the other key figures of the movement like Sachindra Nath Sanyal, Pulin Behari Das, and his fellow compatriots of Calcutta like Ullaskar Dutta and Indu Bhusan Roy. He became a great inspiration to the younger freedom fighters who saw him as a guide or a guru, for his experience and scholarly disposition.

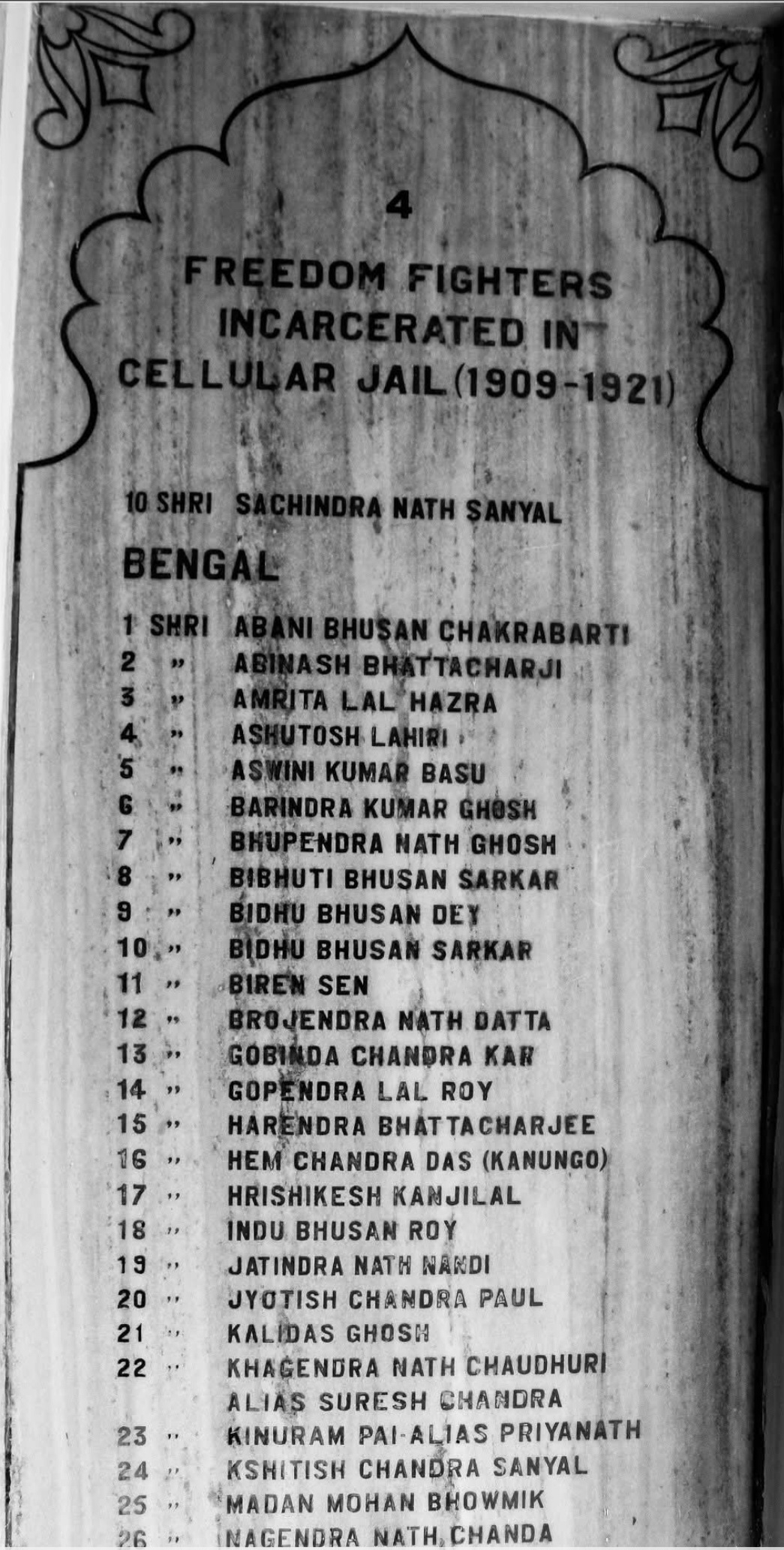
One of the many list of detainees from Bengal, his name is on the 16th position

Though sentenced to life, Hemchandra Kanungo was eventually released from the Cellular Jail in 1921, largely due to a general amnesty that occurred around 1920 between Indian National Congress and the British Raj. Upon his release, he initially recommitted himself to the Indian Independence movement.

== Later life ==
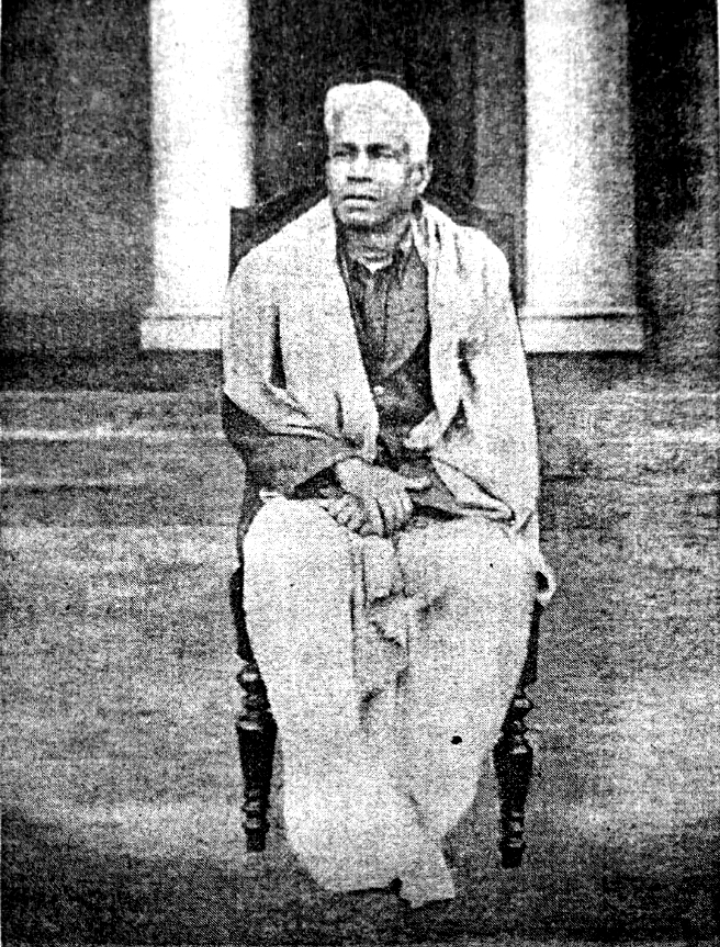
Veteran revolutionary, Hemchandra Kanungo

He was released from Cellular Jail in February, 1921. After his release, he again committed himself to the Indian Independence movement. He also worked with Manabendra Nath Roy for a short while. Slowly, he returned to his normal life after 1925. He returned to his native village, Radhanagar, and rekindled his old hobbies of photography and art. The picture that he drew for Raja Narendra Lal Khan is displayed at the Narajole Rajbari.

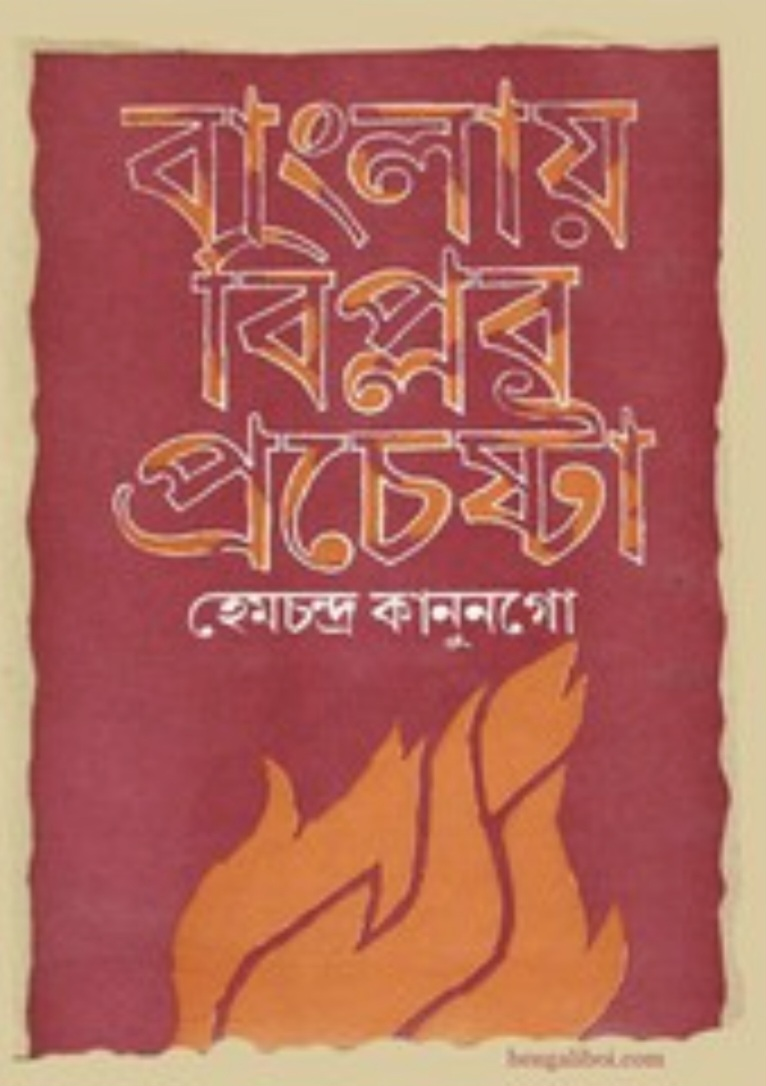
Banglay Biplabi Prochesta, Bengali version of the book by Hem Chandra Das Kanungo. One of the most comprehensive and detailed accounts of the revolutionary movement.

He wrote and published many books on the revolutionaries of India; he also wrote songs and poems. His book “Banglay Biplabi Prochesta” (1928) has been widely acclaimed as one of the most comprehensive first-hand accounts on the revolutionary movement. His other book, “Onagoto Sudiner Torey” (1945), has also been hugely acclaimed. However, it is also to be noted that in the later phase of his life, after his return from the Andamans, he grew highly critical of the way in which the revolutionary movement was carried out and organised, he gave an accurate and staunch critique of the movement in his books and also suggested ways by which it could have gone differently, as a final advice for the later revolutionaries.

== Personal life ==
In 1887, in just 16 years of age, his marriage was set with Sarat Kumari Debi, the daughter of Dr. Mahendra Chandra Maity and Janaki Debi of Panchbera village in Tamluk Subdivision. Sarat Kumari was only 10 years old at that time. He had three children, two daughters, Manossundari and Ashalata and one son, Manobandhu.

== Death & Legacy ==
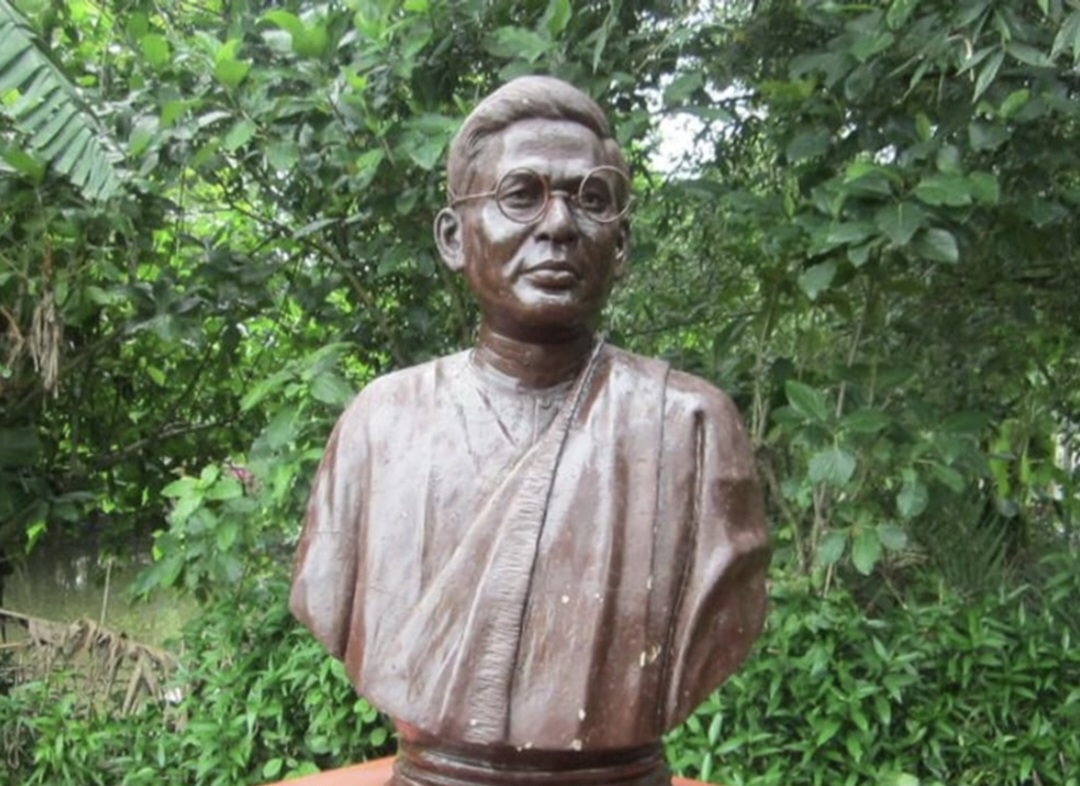
Bust of Hemchandra Kanungo, at his native village.

He died at the age of 79 in 8 April 1951 in Midnapore Hospital. He forged a lasting legacy as one of India's earliest revolutionary nationalists, pioneering the use of explosives in the armed struggle against British rule. He secretly traveled to Paris in 1906–07, mastering bomb-making from Russian anarchists, and returned to establish the Bomb factory in Manicktolla in Kolkata, training Anushilan Samiti and Jugantar members in chemistry and sabotage techniques. His efforts fueled key actions like the 1908 Muzaffarpur bombing attempt by Khudiram Bose and Prafulla Chaki, leading to the high-profile Alipore Bomb Case, where Kanungo received a life sentence in the Andamans alongside Aurobindo and Barindra Ghosh.

The Calcutta Flag, drawn and designed by Hemchandra Kanungo and Sachindra Prasad Bose

Released in 1921 from Cellular Jail, Kanungo shifted toward socialism while documenting Bengal's revolutionary phase in his 1926 book "Banglay Biplabi Prochesta", influencing later generations of freedom fighters. He co-designed the Calcutta flag in 1906, a precursor to Bhikaiji Cama's 1907 design and modern India's tricolor, symbolizing early nationalist iconography. His emphasis on physical training, ideology, and secret societies inspired youth across Bengal, sustaining armed resistance momentum despite personal sacrifices, and cementing his role as a bridge between early swadeshi militancy and broader independence efforts.

== Gallery ==
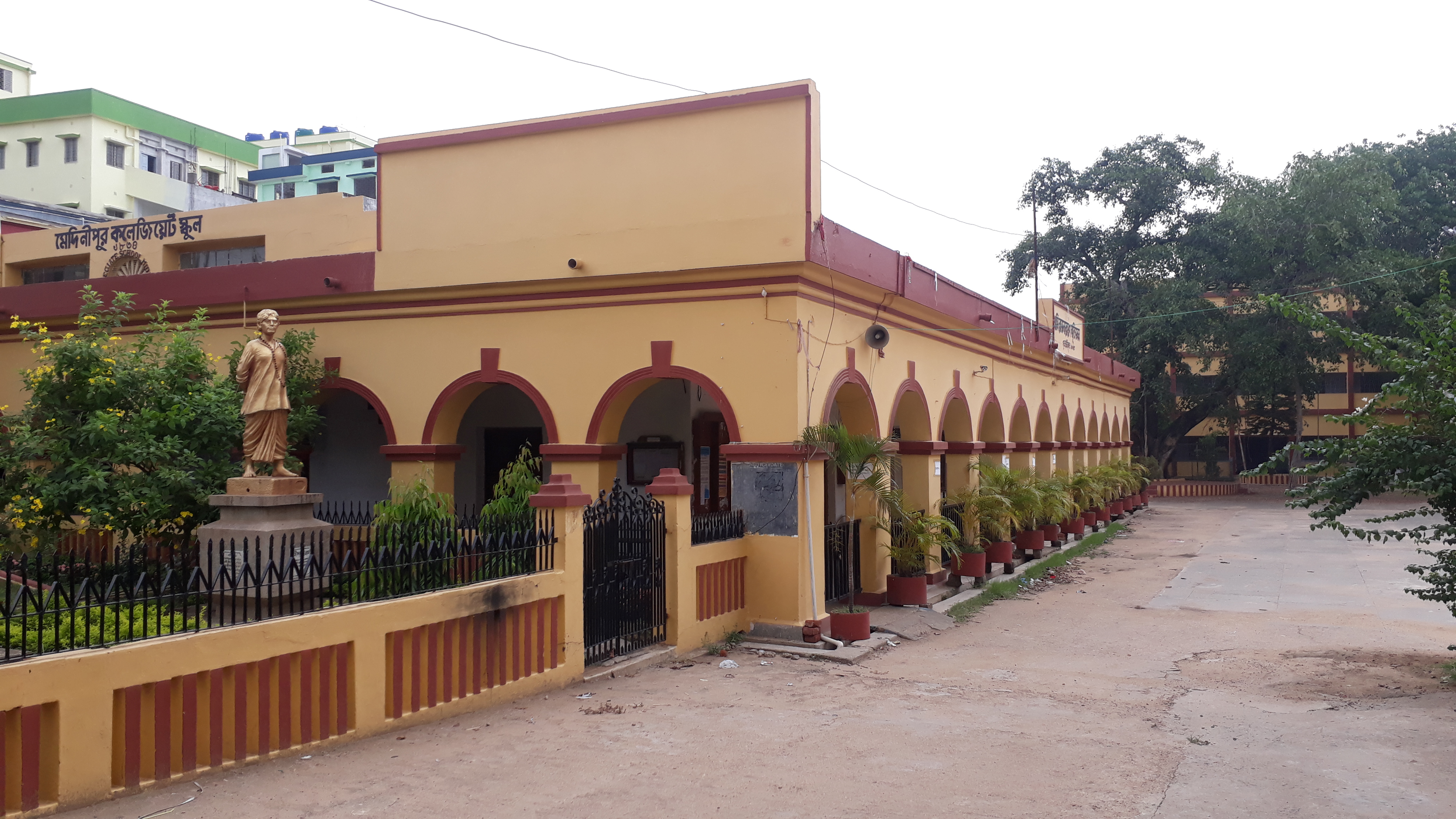
The Midnapore Collegiate School, where he worked as a faculty, while secretly inspiring and instructing the students on the ways of revolution.

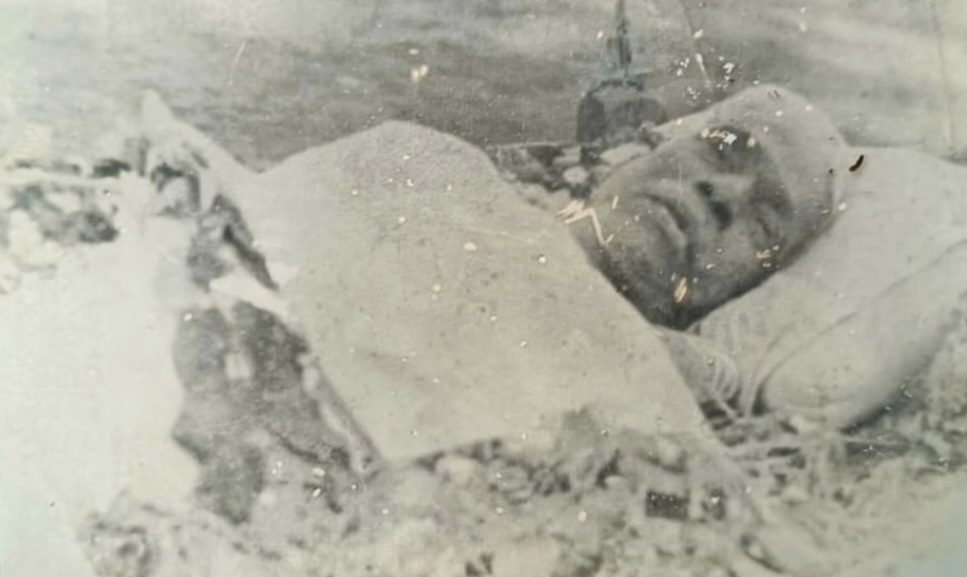
This is the last picture taken of the veteran revolutionary Hem Chandra Das Kanungo, just before his cremation.

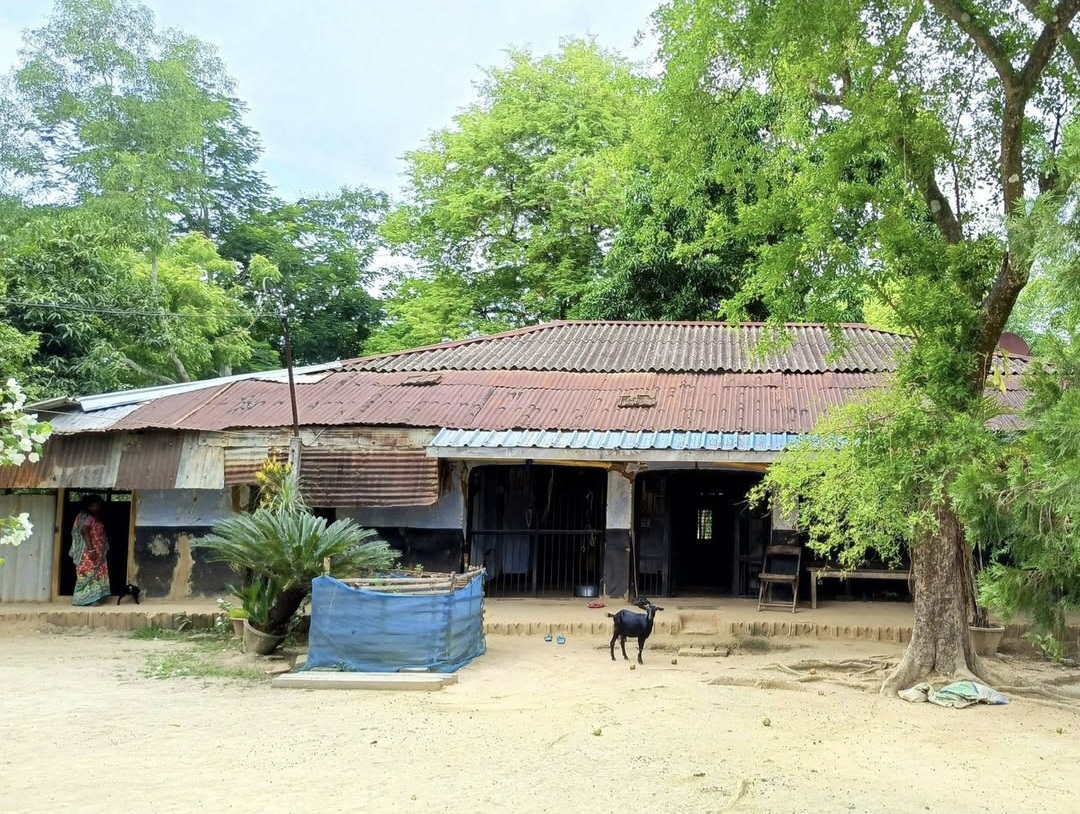
This is the house of revolutionary Hemchandra Kanungo in Radhanagar village of Paschim Medinipur. This the place where he was born and spent the last days of his life.

== Family tree ==
Raghab Ram Das
  - Madan Mohan Das
    - Panchanan Das
      - Gouri Mohan Das Kanungo
        - Gopi Mohan Das
        - Bhuban Mohan Das
        - Mathura Mohan
          - Kshetra Mohan Das Kanungo, m. Komal Kamini Debi of Turka Raj
            - Hemchandra Kanungo, m. Sarat Kumari Debi
              - Manosh Sundari Debi
              - Manab Bandhu Kanungo
              - Ashalata Debi
        - Chandra Mohan Das Kanungo
    - Bungarnarayan Das
    - Brojo Mohan Das

== See also ==
- Anushilan Samiti
- Alipore Bomb case
- India House
- International Socialist Congress, Stuttgart 1907
- Paris Indian Society
- Bhikaji Cama
- Turkagarh Royal Family
