= Allahabad Bank =

Indian bank, 1865–2020

- Type: Public
- Traded as: BSE: 532480; NSE: ALBK
- Industry: Banking, Financial services
- Founded: 24 April 1865; 161 years ago
- Defunct: 1 April 2020; 6 years ago
- Fate: Merged with Indian Bank
- Successor: Indian Bank
- Headquarters: Kolkata, India
- Number of locations: 3230 branches (2019)
- Area served: India
- Key people: Ch. S. S. Mallikarjuna Rao (MD & CEO)
- Services: Commercial bank; Finance and insurance; Retail banking
- Revenue: ▼₹18,564.50 crore (US$1.9 billion) (2019)
- Operating income: ▼₹2,767.01 crore (US$290 million) (2019)
- Net income: ▼₹−8,333.96 crore (US$−870 million) (2019)
- Total assets: ▼₹248,575.77 crore (US$26 billion) (2019)
- Number of employees: 23,210 (2019)

Allahabad Bank was an Indian nationalised commercial bank with its headquarters in Kolkata, India. Founded in Prayagraj in 24 April 1865 and nationalised by the government of India in 1969, the bank provided banking and financial services for 155 years until it was merged with Indian Bank in 2020. It was the oldest still running joint stock bank in India until its merger.

As of 31 March 2018, Allahabad Bank had over 3245 branches across India. The bank did a total business of ₹3.8 trillion during the FY 2017–18. The bank's market capitalisation in June 2018 was US$573 million and ranked #1,882 on the Forbes Global 2000 list.

== 19th century ==
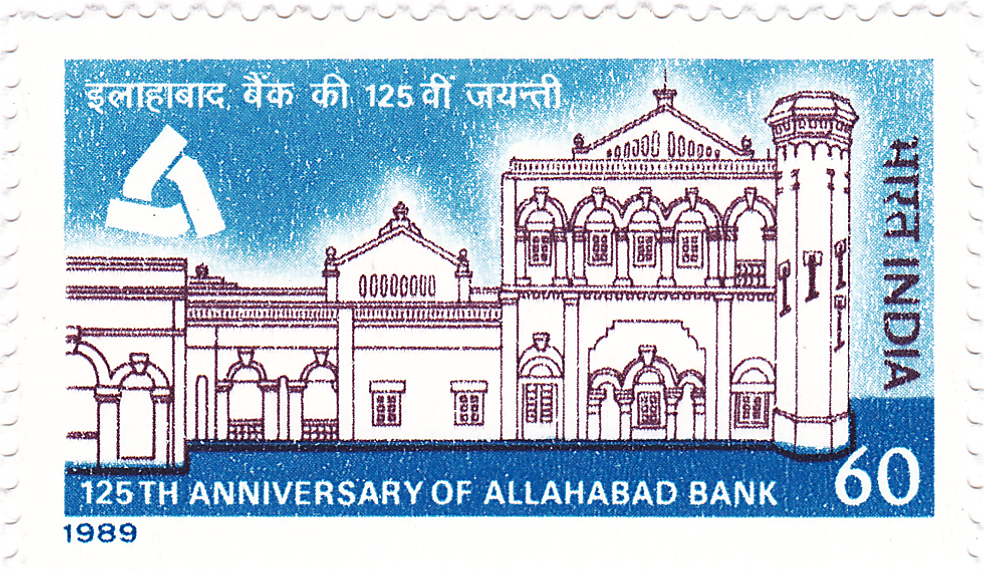
A 1989 stamp dedicated to the 125th anniversary of Allahabad Bank

On 24 April 1865, a group of Europeans founded Allahabad Bank in Prayagraj. By the end of the 19th century it had branches at Jhansi, Kanpur, Lucknow, Bareilly, Nainital, Kolkata, and Delhi.

== 20th century ==
In the early 20th century, with the start of Swadeshi movement, Allahabad Bank witnessed a spurt in deposits. In 1920, P & O Banking Corporation acquired Allahabad Bank with a bid price of ₹436 (US$4.50) per share. In 1923 the bank moved its head office and the registered office to Kolkata for reasons of both operational convenience and business opportunities. Then in 1927 Chartered Bank of India, Australia and China (Chartered Bank) acquired P&O Bank. However, Chartered Bank continued to operate Allahabad Bank as a separate entity.

Allahabad Bank opened a branch in Rangoon (Yangon). At some point, Chartered Bank amalgamated Allahabad Bank's branch in Rangoon with its own. In 1963 the revolutionary government in Myanmar nationalized the Chartered Bank's operations there, which became People's Bank No. 2.

On 19 July 1969, the Indian government nationalised Allahabad Bank, along with 13 other banks. In 1984, the bank forayed into merchant banking activity. In 1991, the bank instituted the All Bank Finance Ltd. as a wholly owned subsidiary for Merchant Banking.

The United Industrial Bank merged with the bank in 1989.

In October 1989, Allahabad Bank acquired United Industrial Bank, a Calcutta-based bank that had been established in 1940 and that brought with it 145 branches. Two years later, Allahabad Bank established AllBank Finance Ltd, a wholly owned merchant banking subsidiary.

Aligning with the SEBI rules and regulations, the company surrendered their merchant banking registration in 1998. Post this, they got registered as an NBFC (Non-Banking Financial Company) with RBI.

== 21st century ==
Its older logo, a monogram consisting of "A" and "B", was replaced by the current 'Triveni Sangam' logo circa 1997.

The government's ownership of Allahabad Bank shrank in October 2002 after the bank engaged in an initial public offering (IPO) of ₹100 million (US$1.0 million) of shares, each with a face value of ₹10. The IPO reduced the Government's shareholding to 71.16%. Then in April 2005 the bank conducted a second public offering of ₹100 million shares, each again with a face value ₹of 10 and selling at a premium of ₹72. This offering reduced the Government's ownership to 55.23%.

In June 2006, the bank opened its first office outside India when it opened a representative office in Shenzhen, Mainland China. In February 2007, Allahabad Bank opened its first overseas branch, in Hong Kong.

On 30 August 2019, Finance Minister Nirmala Sitharaman announced that Allahabad Bank would merge with Indian Bank. The merger would create the seventh largest public sector bank in the country with assets of ₹8.08 trillion (US$84 billion). The Union Cabinet approved the merger on 4 March 2020. Indian Bank assumed control of Allahabad Bank on 1 April 2020.

== International Offices ==
Allahabad Bank transcended national boundaries, and now has multiple international offices. In June 2006, the bank had opened a representative office in Shenzen, China. In 2006, they opened their first branch under core banking services (CBS). In February 2007, the bank opened its first branch in Hong Kong.

== Listings and shareholding ==
Allahabad Bank's equity shares were listed on Bombay Stock Exchange and the National Stock Exchange of India.

Shareholders (as on 31 March 2014)	Shareholding
Promoter Group (Government of India)	64.80%
Indian FIs/MFs	16.60%
Foreign Institutional Investors (FII)	03.20%
Resident Indians	08.80%
Others	06.60%
Total	100.0%

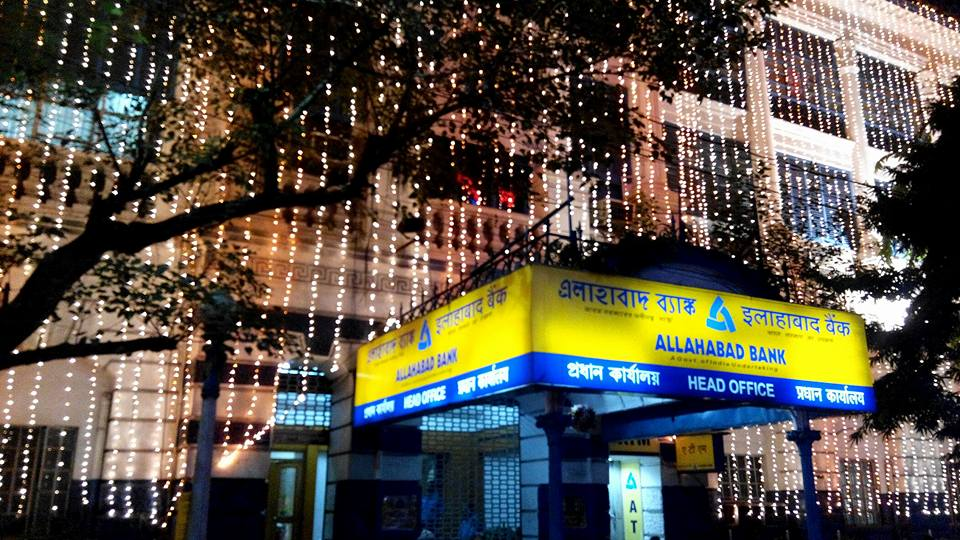
Allahabad Bank head office in Kolkata

== Employees ==
As of 31 March 2013, the bank had 22,557 employees, out of which 3,293 were women (15%). Out of the total employees, 51% were officers, 30% were clerks and the remaining 19% were subordinate staff. The bank recruited 1,950 employees (1,421 Officers, 390 Clerks and 139 subordinate staff) during the same financial year. The company incurred ₹20 billion on employee benefit expenses during the same financial year. During the FY 2013–14, the business per employee was ₹13.50 million and it earned a net profit of ₹0.477 million per employee.

The bank was operating in the following states/UTs.

- Andaman And Nicobar Island
- Andhra Pradesh
- Arunachal Pradesh
- Assam
- Bihar
- Chandigarh
- Chhattisgarh
- Delhi
- Goa
- Gujarat
- Haryana
- Himachal Pradesh
- Jammu And Kashmir
- Jharkhand
- Karnataka
- Kerala
- Madhya Pradesh
- Maharashtra
- Manipur
- Meghalaya
- Nagaland
- Odisha
- Puducherry
- Punjab
- Rajasthan
- Sikkim
- Tamil Nadu
- Telangana
- Tripura
- Uttar Pradesh
- Uttarakhand
- West Bengal

== Scams ==
On 13 July 2019, Allahabad Bank disclosed that it detected a fraud, worth ₹17.7482 billion (US$184 million) by Bhushan Power & Steel (BPSL).

The bank also detected another fraud of ₹6.8827 billion (US$71 million) by SEL Manufacturing Ltd., a Ludhiana-based textile company on 17 July 2019.

== See also ==
- List of banks in India
- Chartered Bank of India, Australia and China
