= Motilal Roy =

Indian revolutionary and journalist (1883-1959)

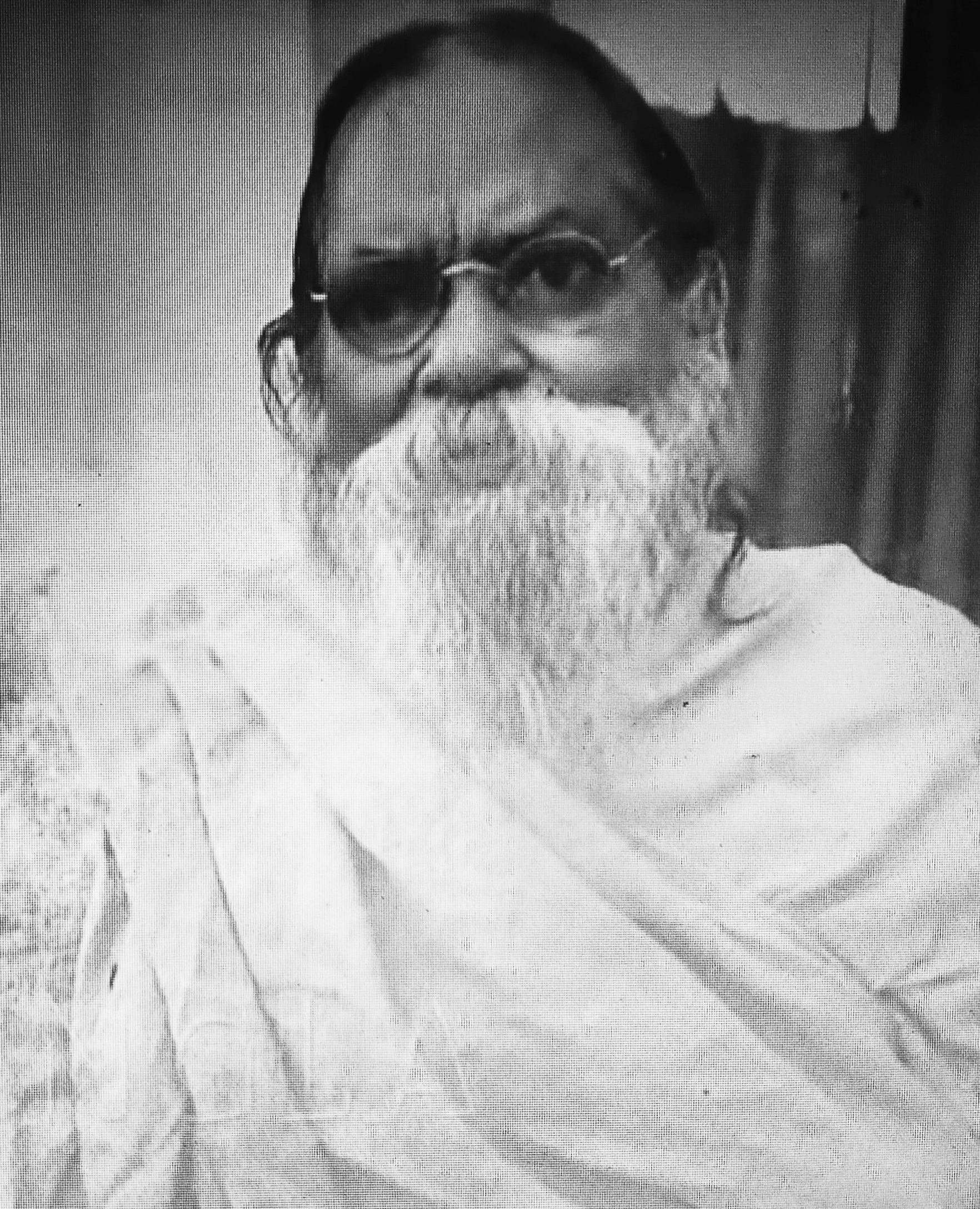
- Born: 5 January 1883; Borai Chanditala, Chandernagore, French India (now in West Bengal, India)
- Died: 10 April 1959 (aged 76)
- Occupations: Revolutionary leader, journalist, social reformer

Motilal Roy (5 January 1883 — 10 April 1959) was a Bengali revolutionary and journalist who founded the Prabartak Sangha, a nationalist organisation for social works.

== Early life ==
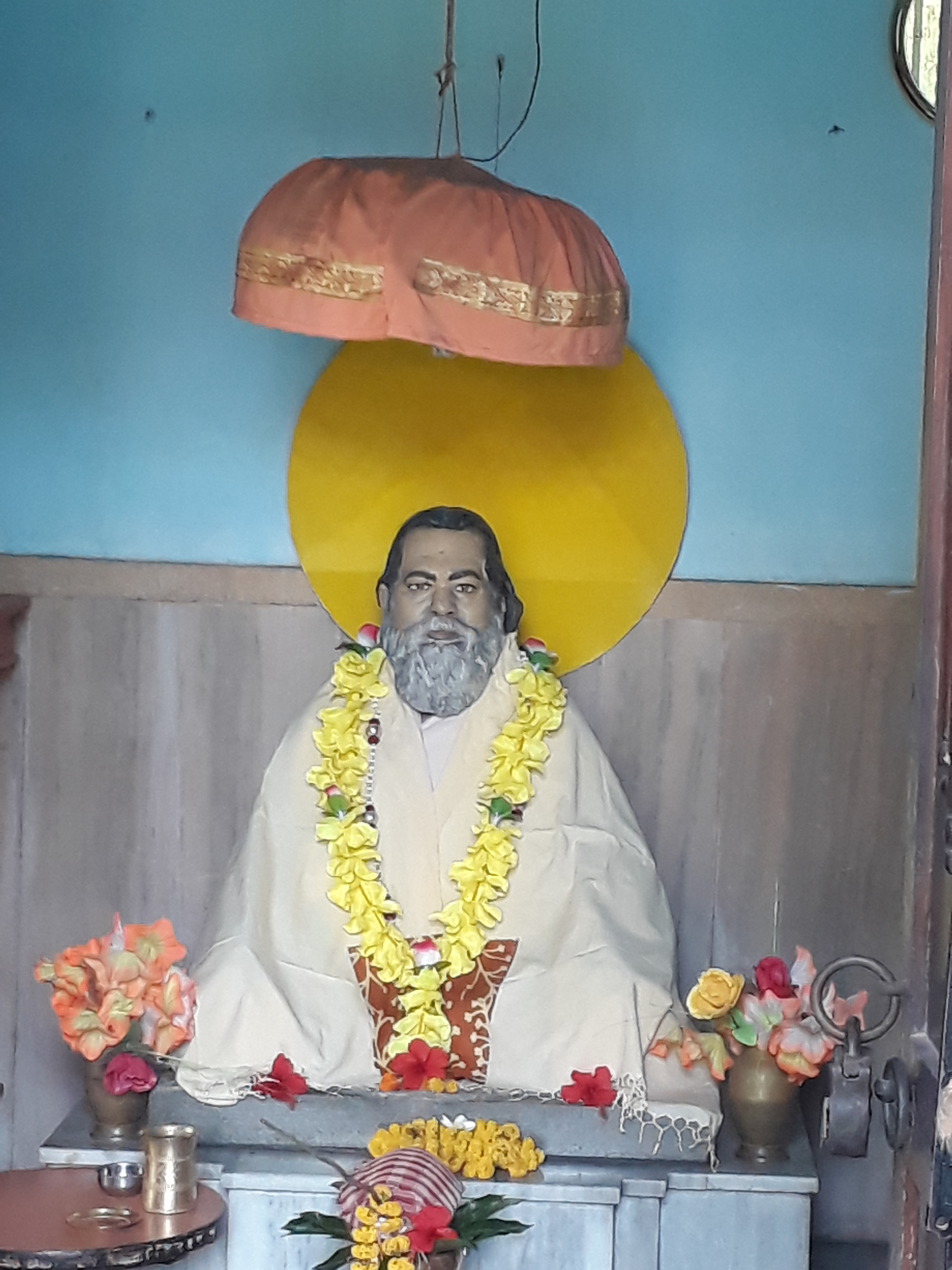
Statue of Roy in Prabartak Sangha

Motilal Roy was born at Borai Chanditala, Chandannagore in French India. His father was Biharilal Singha Roy. After his only daughter died, Roy was attracted to Vaishnavism and in 1920 he organised a group to serve poor people.

== Activities ==
Motilal joined in the movement against Partition of Bengal (1905) in 1905. Later he was attached with armed revolutionaries of Bengal. He collected that revolver and supplied to Kanailal Dutta by Shrish Chandra Ghosh for the assassination of Naren Goswami in 1908. Roy established the Prabartak Sangha under the inspiration of Sri Aurobindo. Roy's home as well as the Sangha were the important safe house of Indian freedom fighters. Hundreds of Indian independence activists took shelter in Roy's house. Being a senior member of the revolutionary group he provided money and arms to the revolutionaries. On 21 February 1910 Aurobindo reached at Chandannagar and stayed in Roy's house for 42 days safely before going Pondicherry. Roy assumed the title of Sangha Guru or the chief spiritual leader of the organization. He also established school, library, students hostel publication house and Khadi business for people. A fortnightly journal of his organisation named Prabartak was edited by another senior revolutionary Manindra Nath Nayak.
