= Prabartak Sangha =

Indian charitable institution (1920)

Prabartak Sangha (Bengali: প্রবর্ত্তক সংঘ) is a charitable institution known for its social work. It was founded in 1920 by Motilal Roy, a revolutionary, who was inspired and initiated in the spiritual path by Sri Aurobindo. Based in Chandernagore, the Prabartak Sangha in its heyday had branches in the districts of Howrah, undivided 24 Parganas and Chittagong.

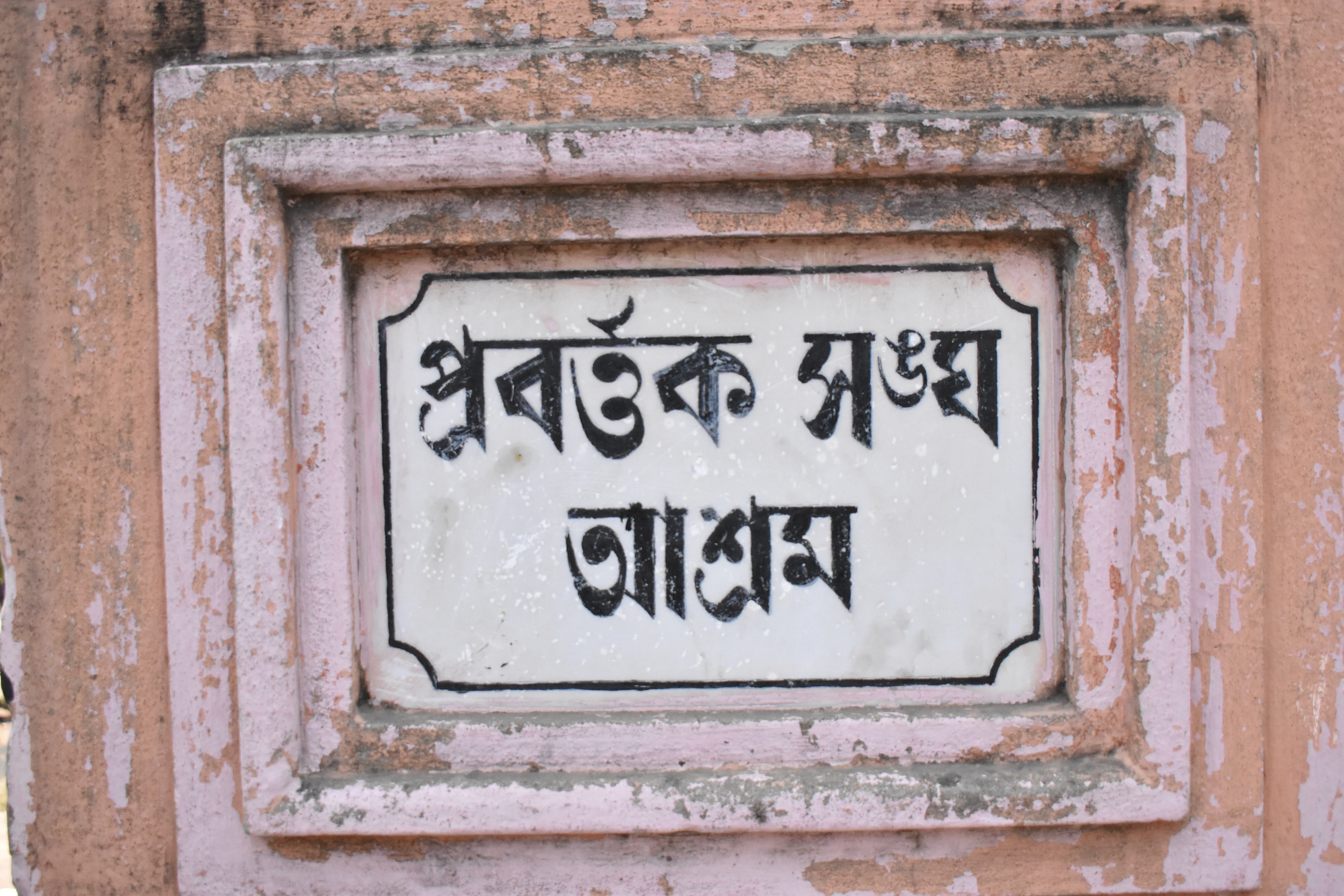
Prabartak Sangha gate

== Foundation ==
In 1915, a Bengali literary magazine named Prabartak was launched under the editorship of Manindra Nath Nayak with the blessings of Motilal Roy and Sri Aurobindo. In 1920, Roy founded the Prabartak Sangha in Chandannagar, then a French possession. In 1925, he assumed the title of Sangha Guru or the chief spiritual leader of the organization. In May 1927, Rabindranath Tagore laid the foundation of the prayer hall of the Prabartak Sangha.

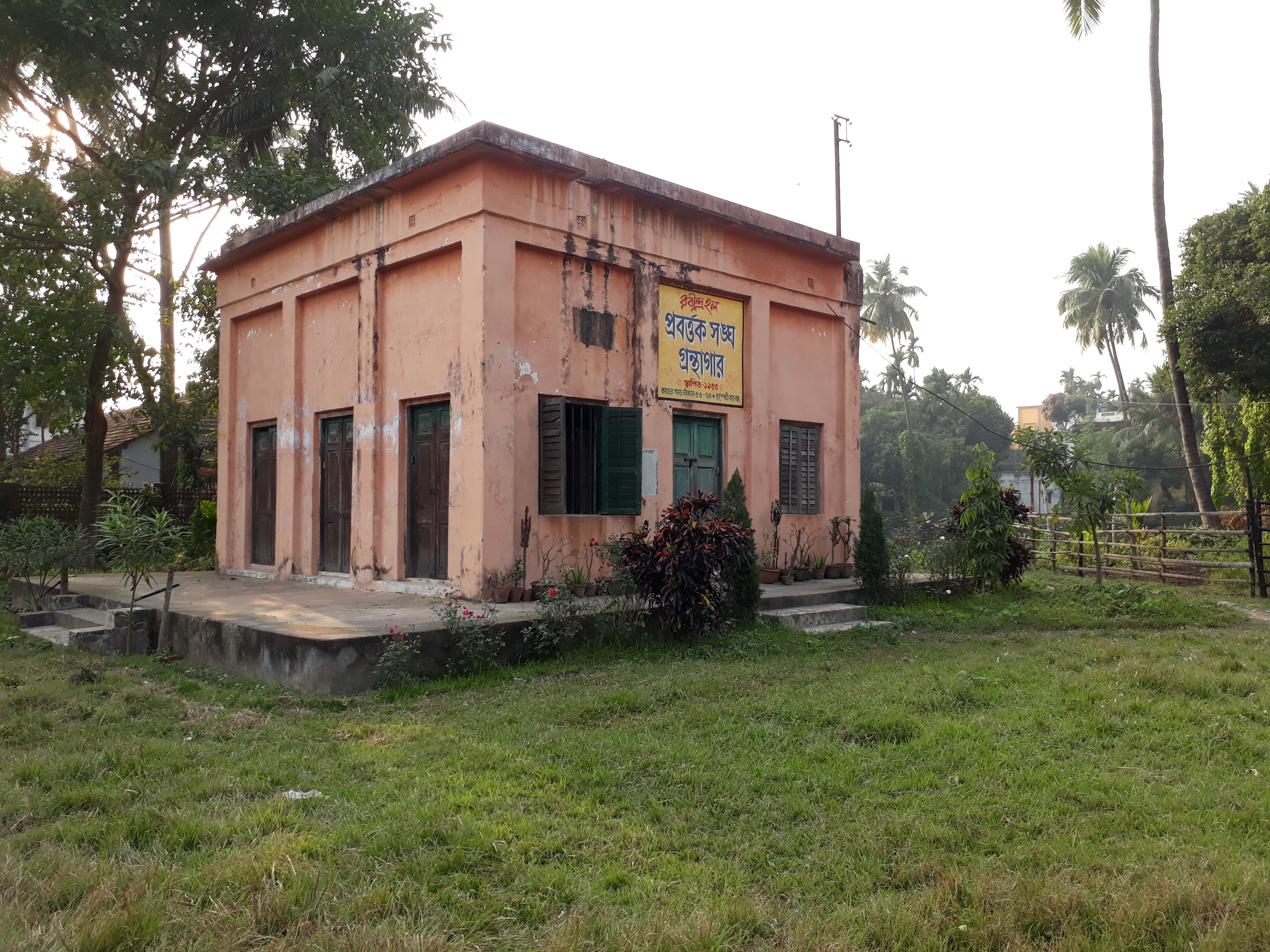
Prabartak Sangha

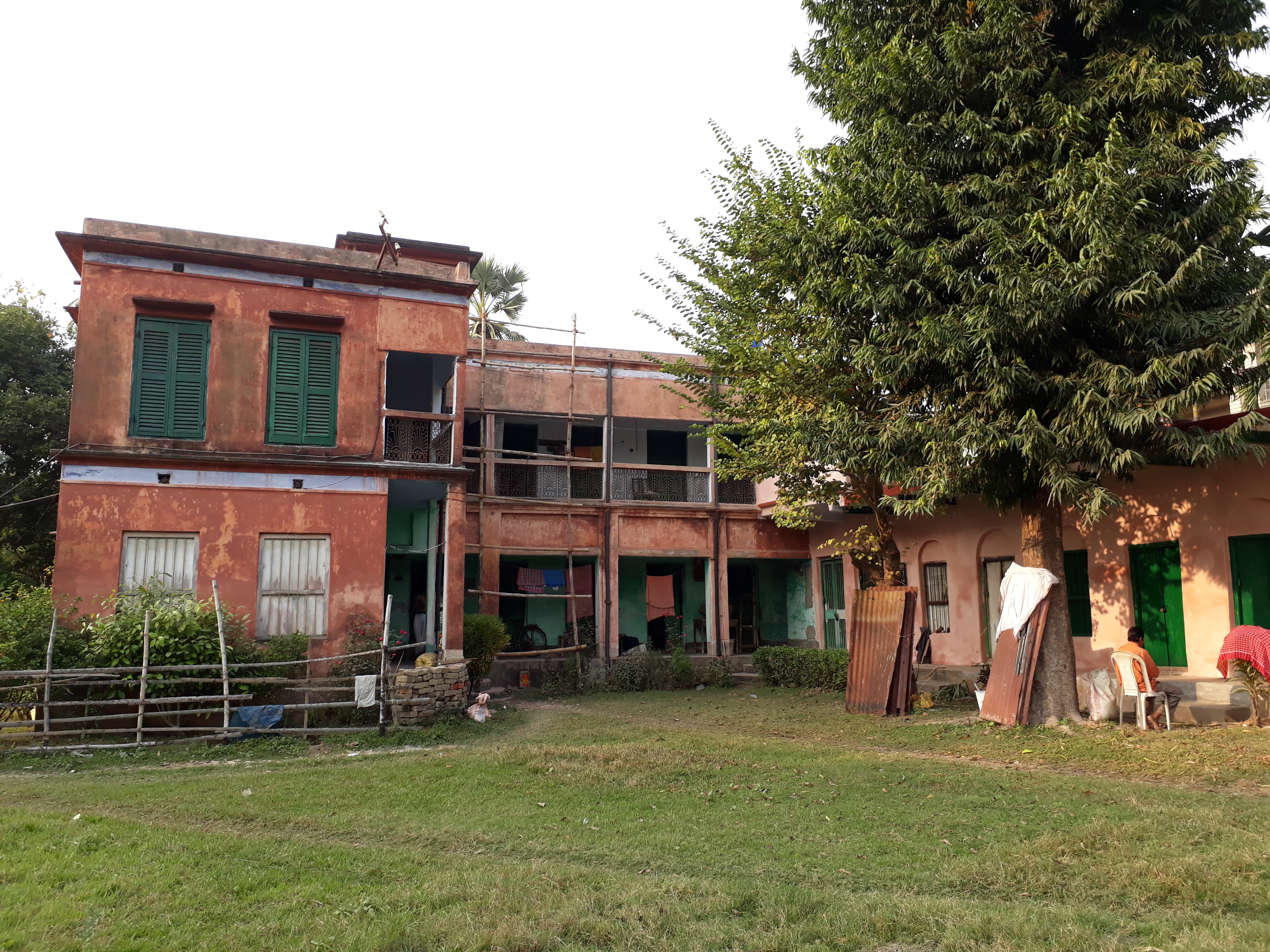
House of Matilal Roy

== Activities ==
The Sangha was founded with the aim of nation building which it sought to achieve through the social and economic upliftment of the masses. It ventured into business, ran educational institutions and established cultural centres to spread the message of its founder. This was also a popular shelter of Indian freedom fighters at that time.

=== Economy ===
The Prabartak Sangha undertook several projects in the economic field, so that the nation can become economically self-sufficient. The Sangha launched a partnership firm Rakshit, Dey and Ghosh Co. that started a carpentry workshop. It later grew into a joint stock company named Prabartak Furnishers Limited with a showroom at Bipin Bihari Ganguly Street in Kolkata. In 1920, the Sangha ventured into agriculture by setting up a farm at Frazerganj in the 24 Parganas. In the same year, it started a textile manufacturing unit named Mrinalini Bastravayana Karyalaya with eight handlooms and paid workers. It use Japanese yarns that could only be replaced by Indian made mill yarns only. By 1925, the Khādī department of the Sangha established branches in Burdwan, Mymensingh, Chittagong and Rangoon. In 1935, it started the Prabartak Jute Mills in Kamarhati, though the production started only in February 1941. It launched the Prabartak Commercial Corporation for the import and export of a wide range of commodities. Apart from these the Sangha had a banking and insurance company named the Prabartak Bank and Insurance Company. It also had a press named the Prabartak Printing and Halftone.

=== Education ===
The Prabartak Sangha established 21 educational institutions in the districts of Hooghly, Howrah, 24 Parganas, Bardhaman, Darjeeling, Chittagong and Faridpur. The profit generated from its businesses were used to run the educational institutes.

== Later years ==
After the Partition, a branch of the Sangha in Pakistan continued to operate in Chittagong. In India, the activities of the Sangha diminished and were centred on the headquarters in Chandannagar. Motilal Roy died in 1959. In the early 1960s the businesses ran into crisis. In 1963, the Prabartak Bank along with the Bank of Bankura merged with the United Industrial Bank. In 1965, the Prabartak Jute Mills were taken over by Sohanlal Mall and later by the JM Group.
