= Calcutta flag =

Unofficial flag of India

The Calcutta Flag

The alternative version.

The Calcutta flag was one of the first unofficial flags of India. It was designed by Sachindra Prasad Bose and Hemchandra Kanungo and unfurled on 7 August 1906 at Parsi Bagan Square (Greer Park), Calcutta. The "flag of Indian independence", which was hoisted by Madam Bhikaji Cama at the International Socialist conference in Stuttgart, Germany, was based on Calcutta flag.

The flag had three horizontal bands of equal width with the top being orange, the centre yellow and the bottom green in colour. It had eight half-opened lotus flowers on the top stripe representing the eight provinces of British India and a picture of the sun and an crescent moon on the bottom stripe. वन्दे मातरम् (Vande Mataram, meaning "Mother, I bow to thee!") was inscribed in the centre in Devanagari.

== See also ==
- Flags of India
