= Prafulla Kumar Sarkar =

Prafulla Kumar Sarkar (1884–13 April 1944) was an Indian journalist, author, and the founding editor of the Bengali daily newspaper Ananda Bazar Patrika, which completed its centenary in 2022. He played a formative role in shaping the newspaper's ideals from the late colonial period, with his editorials marked by deep moral conviction, clarity, and restraint.

== Early life and education ==
Sarkar was born in 1884 in Kumarkhali, in the Kushtia subdivision of the Nadia district of the Bengal Presidency, into a Kayastha family. His father was Prasannakumar Sarkar and his mother was Kumudini Debi.

He studied at the Pabna Zilla School, passing his Entrance Examination in 1901. He continued his studies at the Pabna Institution, standing first in Bengali and receiving the Bankim Medal, establishing his reputation as a gifted scholar early in life. During his student years in Calcutta between 1902 and 1905, Sarkar was deeply influenced by Satish Chandra Mukherjee and the radical Dawn Society (established in 1902), which served as his first initiation into the Swadeshi movement.

In 1906, he married Nirjharini Sarkar, who later became known in her own right for her literary and political contributions.

== Career in law and administration ==
After passing the B.L. examination in 1908, Sarkar joined the Faridpur Bar as a pleader and moved to Daltonganj in present-day Jharkhand. In 1913, he was appointed by the Princely State of Dhenkanal in Odisha as a tutor to the ruling family. His abilities were quickly recognized, leading him to serve in important administrative posts, including Assistant Dewan and later as the Dewan.

== Journalism ==
In late 1921, Sarkar left Dhenkanal and moved to Calcutta at the encouragement of his friend Suresh Chandra Majumdar, working briefly as an assistant editor of the Amrita Bazar Patrika.

When the daily Ananda Bazar Patrika was launched in Calcutta on 13 March 1922, Sarkar became its founding editor. Under his guidance, the paper quickly emerged as a distinctive voice in Bengali public life. He was arrested in 1923 for publishing a life sketch and an editorial on the revolutionary leader Jatindranath Mukherjee on 9 September 1922. He was held as an undertrial prisoner in the Presidency Jail at Alipore while the case proceeded. He was later acquitted and returned to his editorial role, continuing to lead the paper until his death in 1944.

Sarkar was admired for an editorial style that combined a sober tone with a firmness of judgment, using lucid Bengali to make complex political and social questions accessible. In 1942, he was elected President of the Indian Journalists' Association. He also actively promoted Bengali language and culture, helping establish the Bangla Bhasha Sanskriti Sammelan in 1940.

== Literary career ==
Alongside journalism, Sarkar maintained an enduring commitment to literature, writing essays, fiction, biography, and social commentary. He authored novels such as Anagata, Balir Bandh, Lokaranya, Bhrasta-Lagna, and Bidyut-Lekha. He translated the autobiography of the pioneering scientist Prafulla Chandra Ray into Bengali and wrote a biography of the Gaudiya Vaishnavite spiritual leader, Sri Gauranga.

One of his best-known books was Kshayisnu Hindu, a reflective and critical work that sought to confront social stagnation and provoke thoughtful self-examination within Bengali society.

== Death and Legacy ==
Sarkar had been in poor health for some time and relocated to Deoghar for rest and recuperation. He was later brought back to Calcutta and placed under the care of Dr. Bidhan Chandra Roy and Dr. S.N. Sanyal. He died in Calcutta on 13 April 1944 at the age of 61.

He is remembered as a pioneering figure in Bengali journalism and literary culture, helping shape modern Bengali prose through his reasoned editorials and advocacy. His son, Asoke Kumar Sarkar, followed in his footsteps to lead the newspaper and expand the ABP Group.

== Selected compositions ==
=== Novels ===
Novels
Title	Date of Publication	Publisher
Anagata	6 December 1927	Gurudas Chattopadhyay and Sons
Bhrashtalagna	1929	M.C. Sarkar and Sons
Lokaranya	25 April 1930	Gurudas Chattopadhyay and Sons
Balir Bandh	14 September 1931	Gupta Friends and Co.

=== Short Stories ===
Short Stories
Title	Date of Publication	Publisher
Guru-kripa	Sharadiya 1334 (1927)	Ananda Bazar Patrika
Kabir kirti	Sharadiya 1336 (1929)	Ananda Bazar Patrika
Bazikar	Chaitra 1337	Bharatbarsha
Pankaja	Sharadiya 1340 (1933)	Ananda Bazar Patrika

=== Biography and Articles ===
Biography and Articles
Title	Date of Publication	Publisher
SriGouranga	1933 (1st ed.), 1964 (2nd ed.)	Ananda Publishers Private Limited
Kshayishnu Hindu	24 November 1940	Gurudas Chattopadhyay and Sons
Jatiya andolane Rabindranath	28 May 1945	Sri Gouranga Press

=== Language, Literature and Art ===
Language, Literature, Art
Title	Date of Publication	Publisher
Bharater Rashtrabhasha	Annual Dol issue, 2nd Chaitra 1344 (1937)	Ananda Bazar Patrika
Bangla Bhashar Katha ('Bhashar Katha')	Jaishthya 1322	Narayan
Bhakta Kabi Bharatchandra	Desh Sharadiya 3rd year, 48 No., 1343	Ananda Bazar Patrika
Girishchandra	3rd Phalgun 1331 (1924)	Ananda Bazar Patrika
Mahakabi Girishchandra	Desh 1st year, 14 No. 1340 (1933)	Ananda Bazar Patrika
Kabibar Nabinchandra Sen	Magh 1316	Bangadarshan, Nabaparjay
Samaj sanskare Bankimchandra	Ashar 1318 (1911)	Bangadarshan, Nabaparjay
Nitisikshay Bankimchandra	Magh 1318 (1911)	Bangadarshan, Nabaparjay
Jatiya charitre sahityer prabhab	Sharadiya 1342 (1935)	Ananda Bazar Patrika
Bangla sahityer abhab abhijog	Desh 3rd year 7 No. 1342 (1935)	Ananda Bazar Patrika
Sanalochanar mulya	Desh 2nd year, 5 No. 1341 (1934)	Ananda Bazar Patrika
Tarun sahitya	Annual Dol Issue, 21 Phalgun 1334 (1927)	Ananda Bazar Patrika
Bharatiya ChitraParichay	Bangabani, 2nd year, Bhadra 1330 (1923)	Bangabani

=== Social Thoughts ===
Social Thoughts
Title	Date of Publication	Publisher
Samajik jibaner shaishabkal (Manaber ranjnaitik jibaner shaishabkal)	Phalgun 1327 (1920)	Prabasi
Jatiya jibane naitik abanati	41st year Paush 1324 (1917)	Bharati
Sabhyata banam barbarata	42nd year, Ashar 1324 (1917)	Bharati
Jiban dola	Annual Dol Issue Chaitra, 1341 (1934)	Ananda Bazar Patrika
Jatir atmabiswas	43rd year, Shraban 1326 (1919)	Bharati
Jatir jibanishaktihinata	42nd year, Ashar 1325 (1918)	Bharati
Barna-Sankar	43rd year, Bhadra 1326 (1917)	Bharati
Jatiya jibane dhwansher lakshan	Jaishtho 1322 (1915)	Narayan
Jatiya jibane dhwansher lakshan	Kartik 1323 (1916)	Narayan
Prachin juger karsthapan pranali	Bangabani, 2nd year, Magh 1330 (1923)	Bangabani
Bharate dhanasamyabader prayojoniyata	Congress issue, 14 Paush 1336 (1929)	Ananda Bazar Patrika
Hindusamaj ki atmahatya karibe	Chaitra 1333 (1926)	Prabasi
Hindu durgatir mul	14 Baishakh 1336 (1929)	Ananda Bazar Patrika
Hindu Samajer Samasya	Desh 1st year 35 No. 1341 (1934)	Ananda Bazar Patrika
Hindu samajer dourbalya byadhi o pratikar	Sharadiya 1335 (1928)	Ananda Bazar Patrika
Purbaraag	Bharati 43rd year Chaitra 1326 (1929)	Bharati
Hindu Samaje bibaha samasya	Sharadiya 1343 (1936)	Ananda Bazar Patrika

=== Karl Marx and Soviet Country ===
Karl Marx and Soviet Country
Title	Date of Publication	Publisher
Karl Marx	Bangabani 3rd year Agrahayan 1331 (1934)	Bangabani
Duhsahasik pariksha	Desh 1st year, 23 No. 1341 (1934)	Ananda Bazar Patrika
Nutan samajer pattan	Desh 1st year 25 No. 1341 (1934)	Ananda Bazar Patrika
Nutan dharaner karagar	Desh 1st year 28 No. 1341 (1934)	Ananda Bazar Patrika
Asadhya sadhan	Desh 1st year 21 No. 1341 (1934)	Ananda Bazar Patrika

=== Miscellaneous ===
Miscellaneous
Title	Date of Publication	Publisher
Rammohun Roy (Book review – Rammohun Roy by Brajendranath Bandyopadhyay)	20 Ashar 1349 (1942)	Ananda Bazar Patrika
Sambadik Ramananda Chattopadhyay	Ashwin 1351 (1944)	Prabasi
Soujatyabidya ('Soujatyabidya sammondhe dui ekti katha')	Chaitra 1324 / Jaishthya 1325	Bharati
Baigyanik adrishtabad	Phalgun 1323 (1916)	Bharati
Bangshanukramer gorar katha	Bhadra 1324 (1917)	Bharati
Banshanukram o pariparshwik	Agrahayan 1325 (1918)	Bharati
Aloukik	Asharh 1324 (1917)	Bharati
Swadeshi juger usha	Annual Dol Issue, Phalgun 1342 (1935)	Ananda Bazar Patrika
Swadeshi juger smriti	Desh Sharadiya 1st year 46 No. 1341 (1934)	Ananda Bazar Patrika
Aitihasik apabad	Desh Sharadiya 2nd year 45 No. 1342 (1935)	Ananda Bazar Patrika
Hungaryr muktisangram (Hungaryr Muktisangrame Jatiya Neta Mahapran Kasuth O Dick)	Congress Special Issue, 14 Paush 1335 (1928)	Ananda Bazar Patrika
