= Institute of Business Management =

Institute of Business Management may refer to:

- Institute of Business Management, Karachi, Pakistan
- Institute of Business Management, Jadavpur University, Kolkata, India
- Pt. Jawaharlal Nehru Institute of Business Management, Ujjain, India
