= Dawn Society =

Dawn Society may refer to:

- Dawn (Bengali educational society), formed in 1902 in Bengal to promote education and understanding of Indian heritage, achievements, culture and philosophies
- Reimeikai (黎明会, literally "Dawn Society"), a Japanese educational society formed in Japan's Taishō period
- Wabunowin, a distinct Anishinaabe society of visionaries primarily in the Great Lakes region of the United States and Canada
