= Raja Subodh Mullick's house =

Heritage house in Calcutta, India

- রাজা সুবোধ মল্লিকের বাড়ি
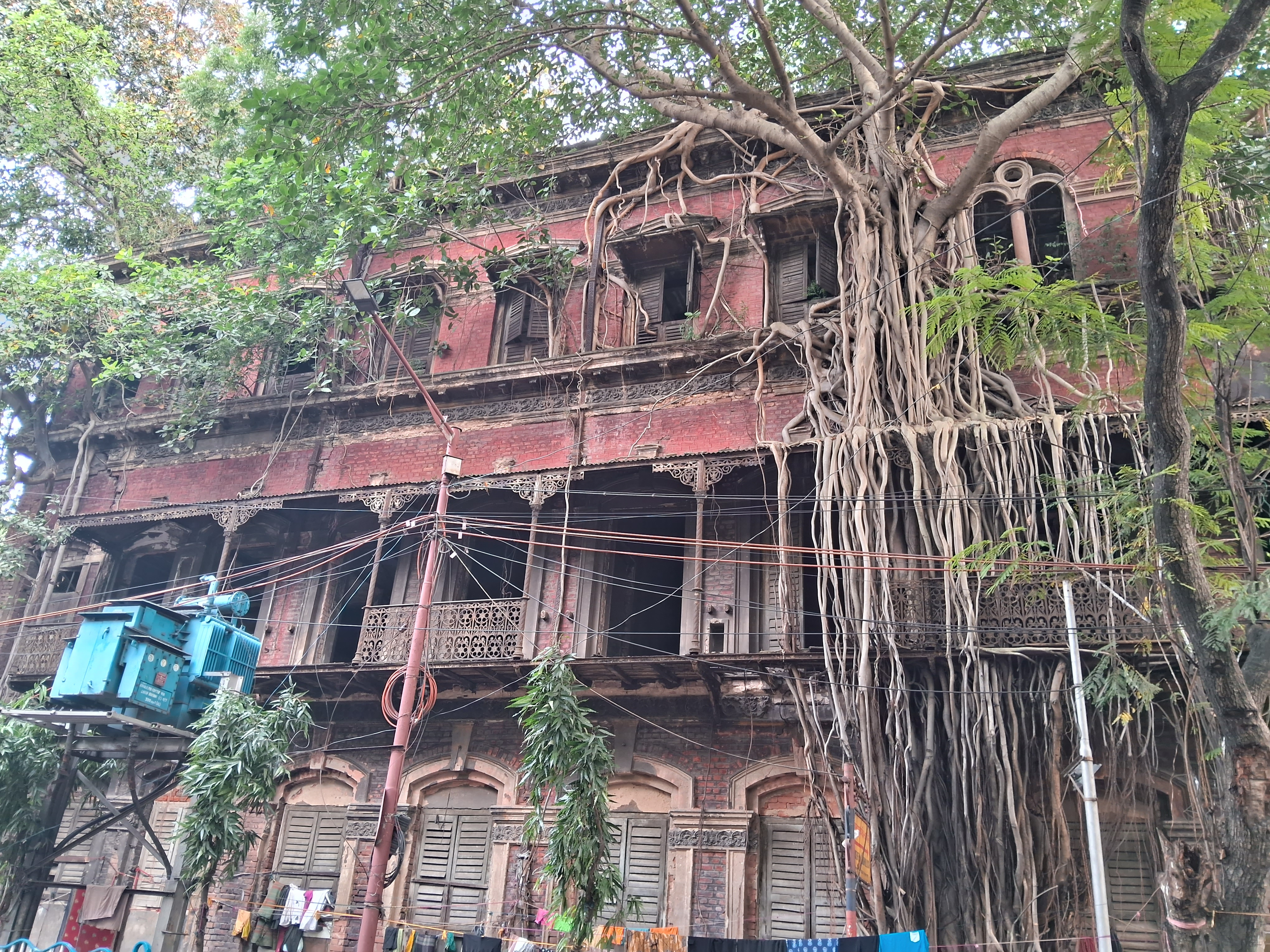
- Façade of the house

General information
- Type: Mansion
- Architectural style: European Neoclassical architecture
- Location: 12 Wellington Square, Calcutta, West Bengal, Calcutta, India
- Coordinates: 22.5633°N 88.3604°E
- Construction started: 1883
- Completed: 1884
- Owner: Historically - The Basu Mullick family; Presently - University of Calcutta (ground and 1st floor) and Mishra family (2nd floor)

Technical details
- Structural system: Load-bearing wall with beam

Raja Subodh Mullick's house is a historic mansion at 12 Wellington Square in Calcutta, West Bengal, India. Associated with the Basu Mullick family, the mansion is noted for its European Neoclassical architecture, ornate interiors, and historical significance. The house was one of the prominent nineteenth-century residences in North Kolkata. In 1998, it was designated as a Grade I heritage building by the Kolkata Municipal Corporation.

The mansion was closely associated with the Indian independence movement. It was built between 1883 and 1884. Subodh Chandra Mullick was four years old at that time. In 1908, the building was searched extensively by the Indian Imperial Police while investigating the Alipore bomb case. In later years, the mansion became the subject of a prolonged inheritance dispute involving the descendants of the Basu Mullick family and the University of Calcutta.

== Architecture and layout ==
The architecture and layout of the house are based on European Neoclassical architecture, both on the exterior and interior. The three-storey house is U-shaped in its structure and it's painted deep red on the exterior. The first alphabet in the Mullicks' surname—"M"—was carved on all the wooden and iron doors of the house. Various European paintings were hung from the walls in most of the rooms. The eminent European paintings also included the paintings of George Washington, made by Gilbert Stuart. The window grilles are designed in the jaafri style of architecture.

The floors on the first floor were covered in white marble, and inside the rooms, the marble floors were covered with carpets. The library had green furnishings and ceiling-touching wall cupboards all around the periphery of the room. One window in the room faced the alley adjoining the house. The rooms and corridors on the ground floor were covered with black marble. The walls had been painted with ornate European–neoclassic style rococo paintings by various Italian artists over many years.

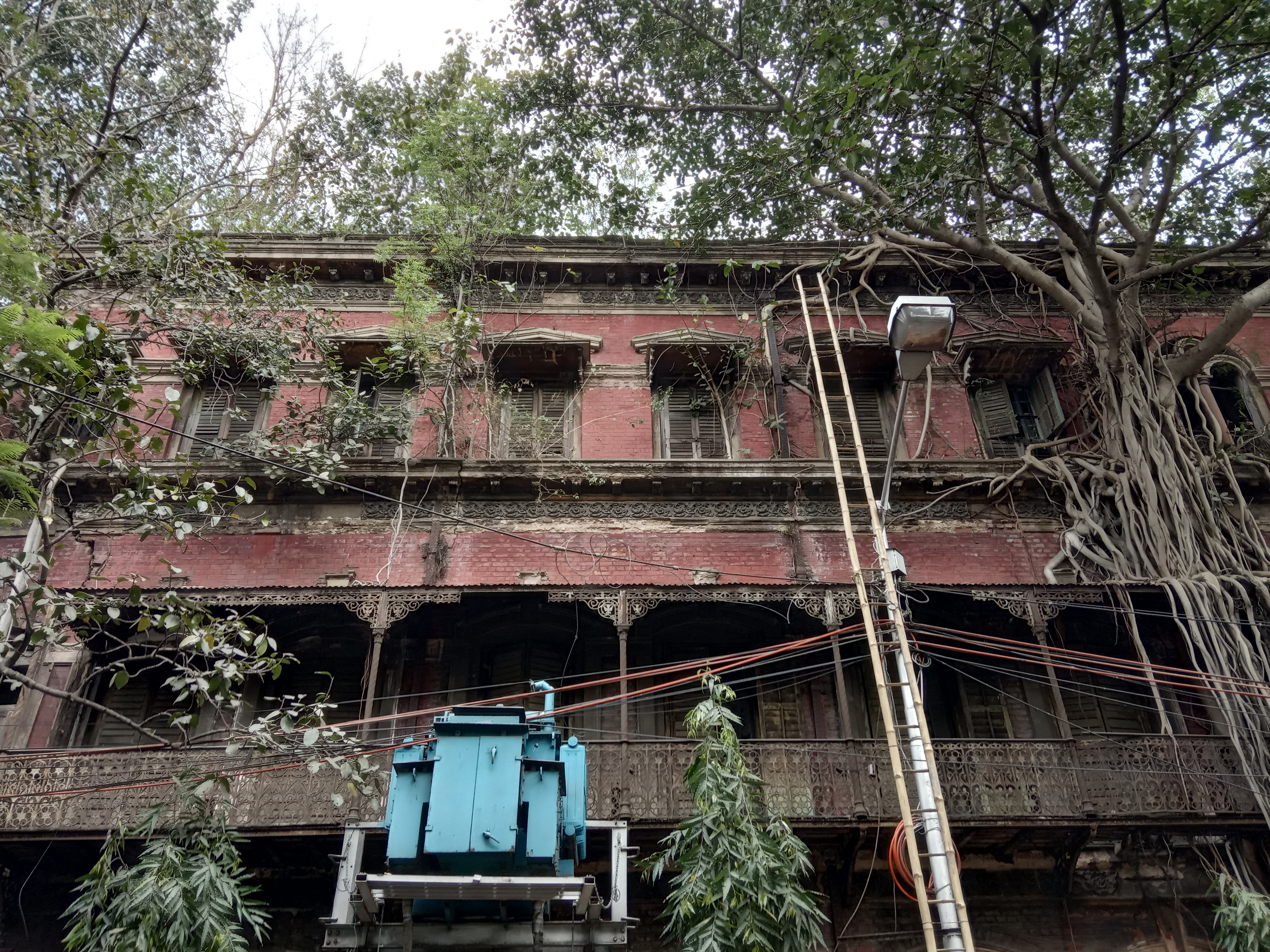
Neoclassical architecture on the façade of the house

There were two kitchens in the mansion — one for the family and the other one for preparing servings to the Hindu deities. Both of them were located in the back wing of the house. The front wing had a baburchikhana. A wooden bridge in the middle wing used to connect the front wing and thr back wing. The women of the Mullick household resided in the back wing. That part of the house also had the Mullick family's deity's room and a strong iron locker room, where the family wealth was stored. There is a rear door present in the back wing. As per the traditions of the household, newlywed brides entered the house through the back door, and unlike the present–day customs, the Basu Mullick family used to have vegetarian meals on the day of marriage. There is a naibatkhana inside the front door, which was purchased by Raja Subodh Mullick's father Prabodh Chandra Basu Mallik.

== Role in independence ==
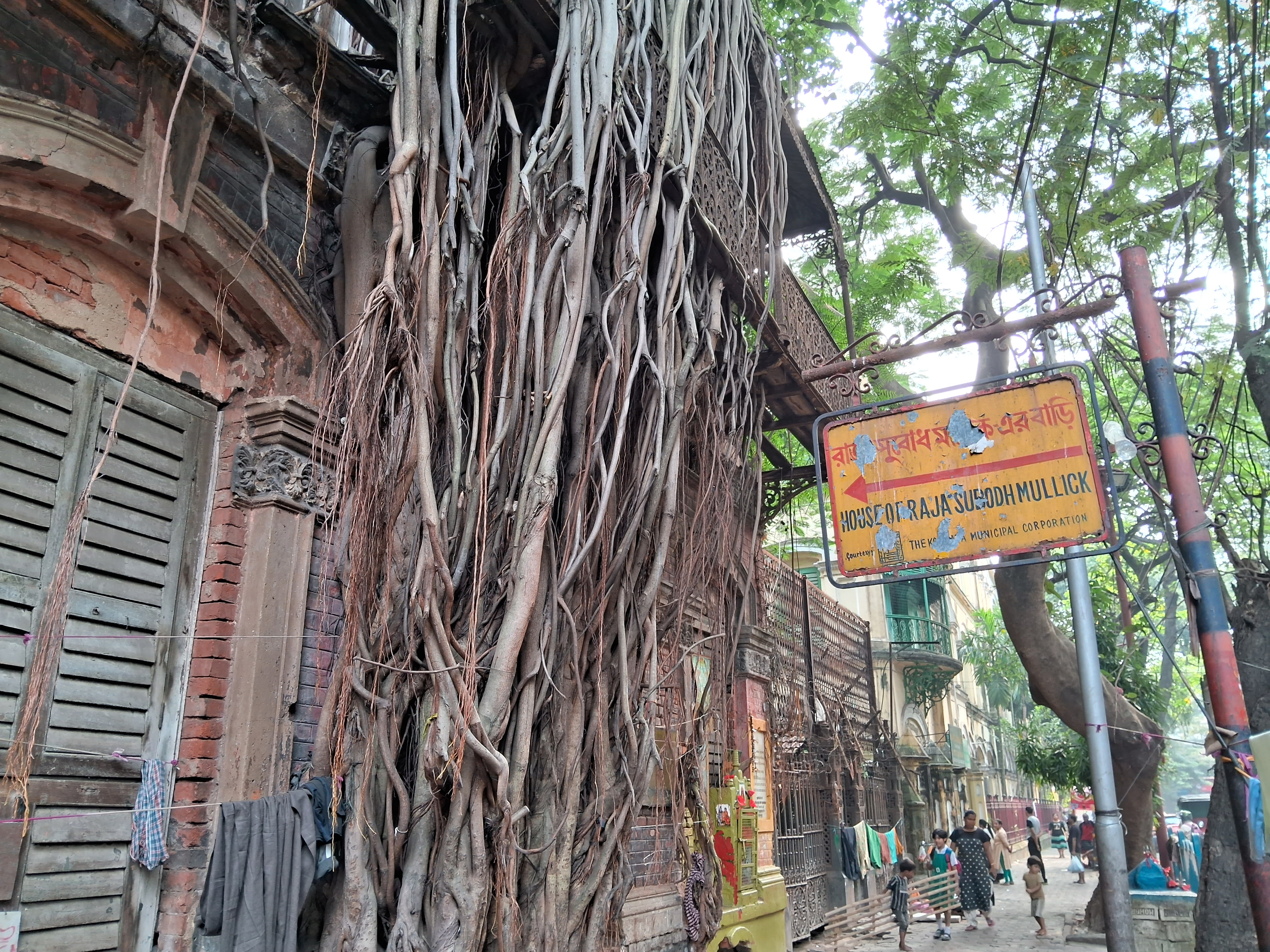
The main gate of the building

The house of Raja Subodh Mullick became a hub of nationalistic and freedom movements. Multiple meetings and gatherings regarding the Swadeshi movement and other freedom movements were held here. During December 1906, the Calcutta session of the Indian National Congress was held at Subodh Mullick's house, and it was presided over by P. Mitter. The session was attended by eminent revolutionaries including Subodh Chandra Mullick, Sri Aurobindo, Abinash Chakrabarty, Bhupendra Nath Datta, Indra Nandi, Annada Kaviraj, Jatindra Nath Mukherjee, Lalitkumar Chatterjee, Jnan Basu, Bireshwar Mukherjee, Paresh Lahiri, Nikhil Ray Maulik, and Pulin Das. In 1907, another conference session of the Indian National Congress was held at this house.

The National Council of Education was set up in this house, in the presence of Sri Aurobindo Ghose, Raja Subodh Mullick, and other dignitaries. Subodh Chandra Mullick donated ₹1 lakh for setting up the Bengal National College. After this huge donation for improvements in education, the common people conferred him the title of "Raja" and henceforth, Subodh Chandra Basu Mullick is being addressed along with his honorary title. Rabindranath Tagore used to visit this house to discuss the educational policies and fund allocation for education with Aurobindo and other professors of the Bengal National College.

== Eminent visitors ==
Raja Subodh Mullick's house was visited by eminent personalities from different fields of life. Rabindranath Tagore and Sri Aurobindo were the most frequent visitors here. Besides, this house was often visited by other eminent personalities, including the Gaekwad of Baroda, Surendranath Banerjee, Ōkuma Shigenobu of Japan, Gopal Krishna Gokhale, Womesh Chunder Bonnerjee, Jyotirindranath Tagore, Bal Gangadhar Tilak, Chittaranjan Das and many others.

=== Association with Aurobindo ===
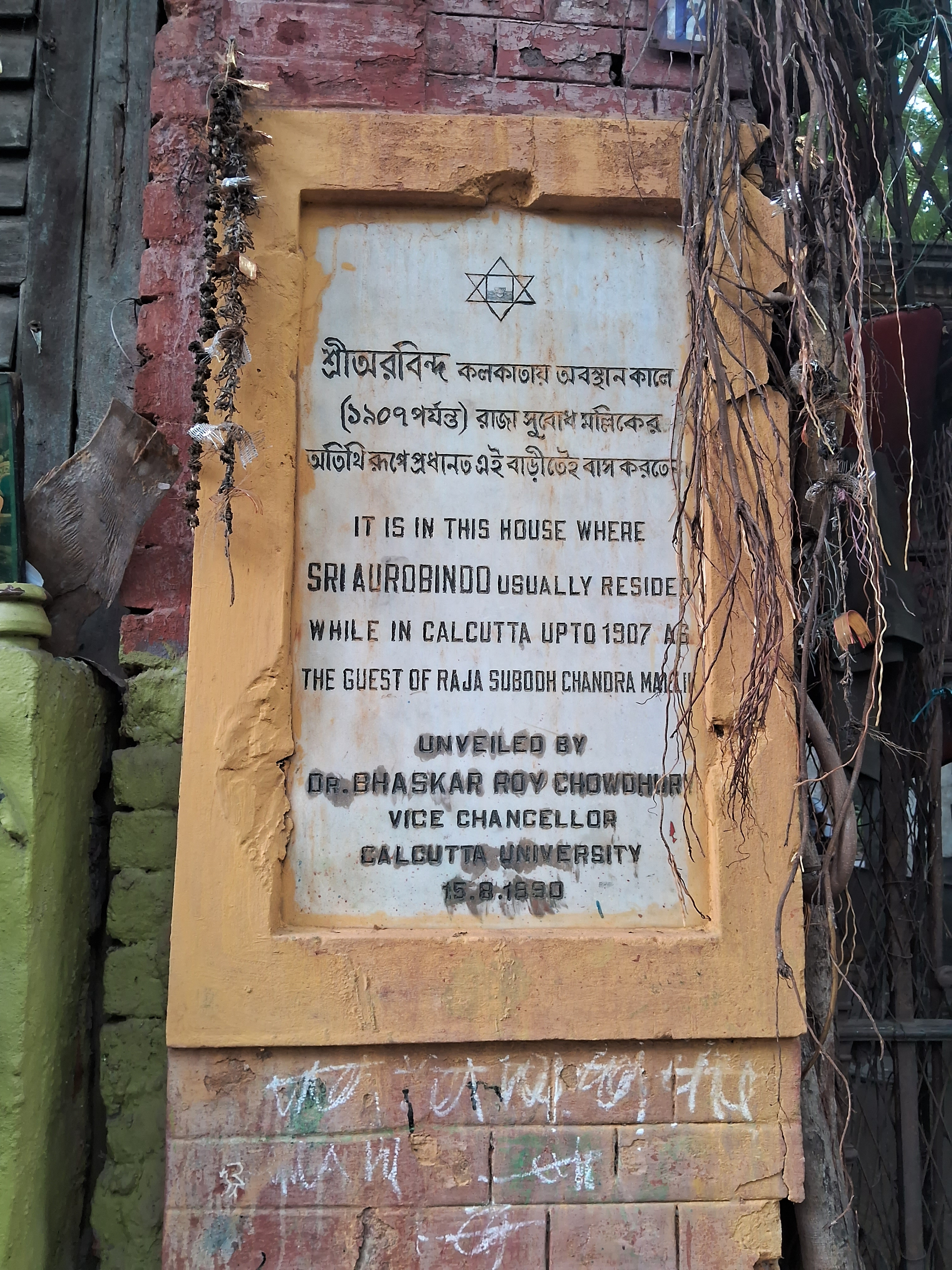
Plaque commemorating Sri Aurobindo's stay at the house

Sri Aurobindo was appointed as the first principal of the Bengal National College. So, when he came to Calcutta from Baroda, he stayed at Raja Subodh Mullick's mansion as a guest from 1906 to 1907. A plaque on the façade of the house commemorates his stay in the mansion. After 1907 he shifted to be more available for the common people. The corner-most room on the north-west of the mansion was Aurobindo's residence during his year-long stay here as a guest. Every evening after returning from the college, he would address the gathering at the house.

The British police arrested Aurobindo in relation to the Alipore bomb case on 2 May 1908. While the Mullick family was away in Varanasi, the Indian Imperial Police inspected and made a mess in the whole house in order to obtain even a tiny bit of evidence regarding Aurobindo's association with the Manicktolla bomb conspiracy. In 1908, Raja Subodh Mullick was arrested by the Indian Imperial police and sent to prison for a period of fourteen months for anti-Crown activities. When he returned to his house after the expiry of his sentence, Aurobindo paid him a visit in February 1910, and it was the last time Aurobindo visited here.

== Legal dispute over inheritance ==
The mansion was jointly owned by Subodh Chandra Mullick and his cousin Nirad Chandra Basu Mullick. Nirad Chandra became the sole owner of all the properties after Subodh Chandra sold his share to him. Nirad Chandra wrote his will on 4 March 1932, which became the centre of the subsequent legal battle. But after Nirad Chandra realised that his only son might not have any offspring, in 1942, he added a codicil to his existing will. In the codicil, Nirad Chandra mentioned that if his son Hambir Chandra died childless, his entire estate of around 31 properties would be donated to the University of Calcutta. Nirad Chandra also directed that the house be converted into a centre of learning and be named after his father, Hem Chandra Basu Mullick. The modified will quoted — "If my son (Hambir Chandra Mullick) has no issue, however distant or adopted son or any issue of such adopted son, my estate shall go to the University of Calcutta for advancement of learning."

Before Hambir Chandra Mullick died childless on 18 November 1976, he had recklessly scattered away most of the 31 properties of the Basu Mullick family, leaving the house and few others. With the will of Nirad Chandra as the principal document, the University of Calcutta was able to establish its right over the properties after fighting 66 cases through 31 years in different courts in India. In May 2007, the final decision from the Supreme Court of India ruled out that those in possession of the properties sold by Hambir Chandra, they couldn't retain them because, as per the will of Nirad Chandra, those properties were to be donated for educational purposes and Hambir Chandra didn't have absolute ownership of those properties. Hambir Chandra would have become its absolute owner post his death, ergo the properties he sold in his lifetime can't be legal business.

But, on the other hand, after Hambir Chandra's death, his caretaker Mahadeo Prasad Mishra had claimed his share in the mansion in 1977; ergo, the University of Calcutta got possession of only the ground floor and the first floor of the house on 19 September 1977. Mahadeo Mishra retained the second floor. In an interview, Mahadeo Mishra's son said, "There was one clause in Nirad Chandra’s will that said if Hambir Chandra does not dispose the property then it will go to the university. But there was a registered agreement between my father and Hambir Chandra that says that we have the right to this property". Due to this shared arrangement to date, Calcutta University couldn't go forward with their plans of demolishing the existing dilapidated structure and turning the place into an international-standard conference venue, thus using the building for educational purposes, as it was indicated in the will of Nirad Chandra Mullick.

=== Due tax ===
In 2018, the Kolkata Municipal Corporation informed that Raja Subodh Mullick's house has a property tax due of ₹13 lakh. Coupled with it is a fine of ₹55 thousand, imposed for the delay in tax payment. Despite the property being owned by the Calcutta University and Mishra family, Hambir Chandra Basu Mullick's name is written on the ownership records of the KMC. When Kunal Basu Mullick, one of the descendants of the Basu family, was asked about this, he said that its ownership belonged to the Calcutta University from 1970s. They didn't knew anything about this. So, if a there was due tax, it should be paid by the university.

== Ignominy and decline ==
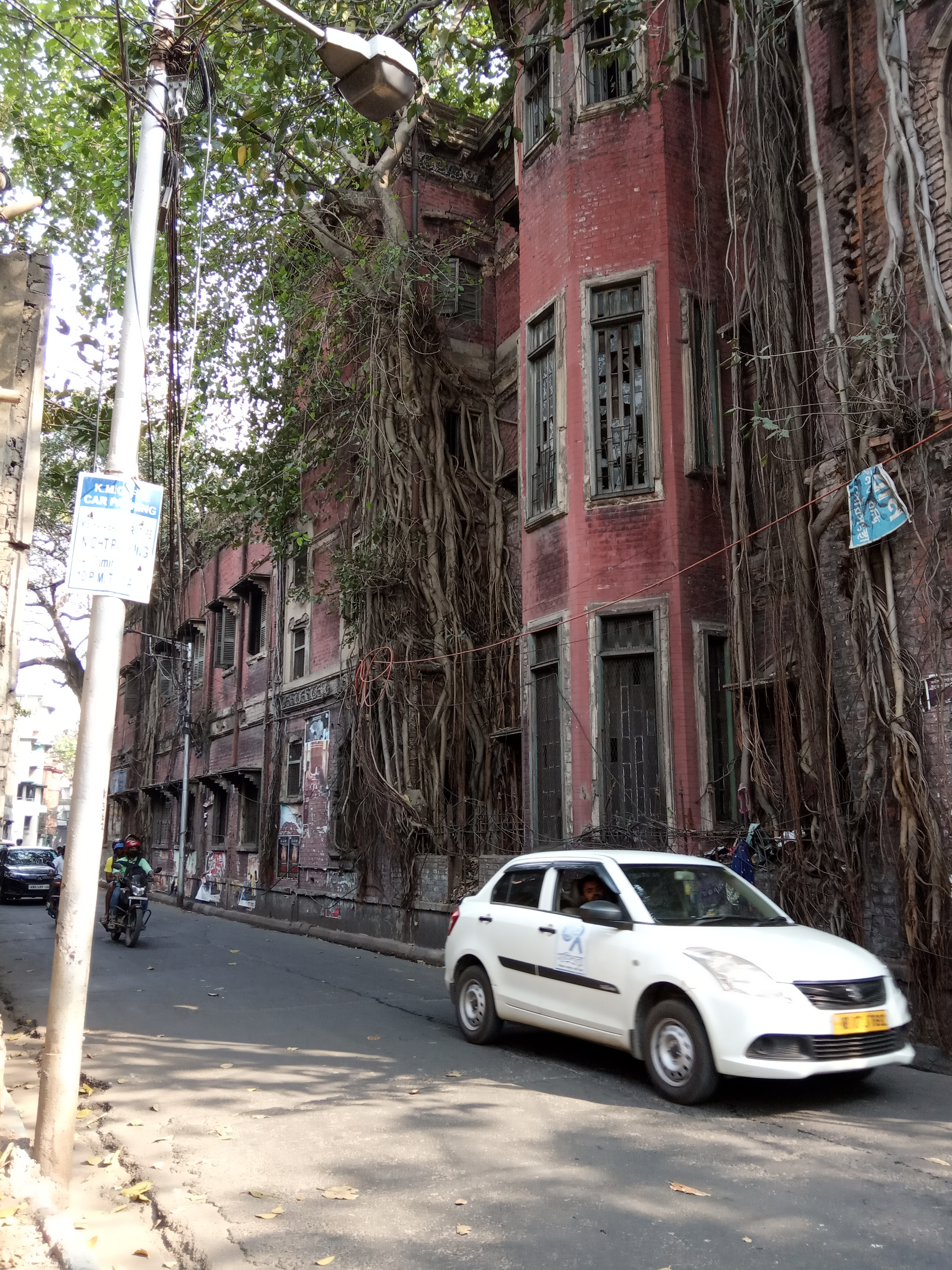
The shattered window panes and banyan's prop roots covering the building

Over the years, ignominy and lack of any management have turned this heritage house into a dilapidated mansion. Only the ground floor of the house is enterable. The main gate of the house usually remains locked. The iron rods at the gate have worn down over time. Parts of the terrace have fallen down and collapsed. Although the staircase is intact, the naubatkhana is in ruins. The plaster has worn off in many places, and large parts of the house are now covered with innumerable adventitious prop roots of banyan and peepul trees. The iron grills on windows are covered in rust. Most of the glass window panes have shattered. Many of the wooden window flaps have also broken down. Few windows on the first floor have completely broken down, creating hollow arch openings at their place.

In the early 2010s, parts of the building had collapsed, and it took months to clear the debris. The courtyard of the house has been illegally occupied by many motor repair shops. The adjoining garden of the mansion has also been encroached. As of 2018, eleven families with 80-90 members live on the footpath adjoining the house. Those residents were assured of being provided accommodation somewhere else, but no such arrangements have been made.

In 1998, it was declared a Grade I heritage building by the Kolkata Municipal Corporation. In 2004, the Kolkata Municipal Corporation marked this as an "extremely vulnerable" building along with 150 others. Calcutta University had plans for demolishing and replacing the building, but their plan has been stuck due to legal complications. When rumours spread that the Kolkata Municipal Corporation was planning to demolish the house, Alapan Bandyopadhyay, the commissioner of the Kolkata Municipal Corporation in 2007, said that KMC had not planned any such thing and, additionally, they had lost the files regarding the ownership of Raja Subodh Mullick's mansion.

== Nearby historical landmarks ==
Wellington Square has a rich history of colonial–era and post–independence landmarks. Historical landmarks in and around Raja Subodh Mullick's house include the College Street, Presidency University, College Street Coffee House, Indian Museum, Lenin Sarani, Bhutia Market and Sir Stuart Hogg Market.
