= Anandabazar Patrika =

Bengali-language daily newspaper

- Anandabazar Patrika front page on 5 May 2026
- Type: Daily newspaper
- Format: Broadsheet
- Owner: ABP Group
- Editor: Ishani Dutta Ray
- Founded: 13 March 1922; 104 years ago
- Language: Bengali
- Headquarters: Kolkata, West Bengal, India
- Circulation: 802,289 (as of Jan–Jun 2022)
- Sister newspapers: The Telegraph
- OCLC number: 187024438
- Website: www.anandabazar.com

Anandabazar Patrika is a Bengali-language broadsheet daily newspaper published in Kolkata, India, and owned by the ABP Group. First issued on 13 March 1922 as a four-page evening paper and noted for its bold stance against colonial rule, earning the nickname "danger signal" in contemporary British press. It has grown to become one of India's top regional-language newspapers, with a certified average circulation of 802,289 copies for January–June 2022.

The paper is currently edited by Ishani Dutta Ray. Its major competitors include Bartaman, Ei Samay, Sangbad Pratidin, Aajkal, Jago Bangla, Uttarbanga Sangbad, Ganashakti and Dainik Statesman—as noted in regional media landscape surveys.

== History ==
A Bengali newspaper was published in 1871 in a small village of Magura at Jessore District in British India (now Bangladesh) by Sisir Kumar Ghosh, the father of Tushar Kanti Ghosh. He named it Ananda Bazar after Tusharkanti's grandmother's sister Anandomayee. However, soon the newspaper died. In 1868, Ghosh published another newspaper, named after his grandmother Amritamoyee: Amrita Bazar Patrika.

Later in 1922, the Anandabazar Patrika was relaunched by proprietor Suresh Chandra Majumdar and editor Prafulla Kumar Sarkar. It was first printed on 13 March 1922 under their ownership and was against British rule. In 1922 it first published as a four-page evening daily. After the death of Prafulla Kumar sarkar, his son Ashok Kumar Sarkar upgraded the magazine. The first colour printing was the features section. The internet edition of the newspaper was launched in 2001, which publishes news among the community. Also provides advertisement in the printed newspaper. In 2010, Time Inc. entered into a license agreement with ABP Group to publish Fortune India magazine. This magazine publishes the Fortune India 500 list every year.

== Criticism and controversies ==
=== Editorial bias accusations ===
The newspaper has faced allegations of compromising editorial independence under political pressure, notably following the resignation of its editor in June 2020 after being summoned by the police. Media analysts have frequently cited such leadership transitions as indicators of the challenges facing press freedom within the state's polarized political climate. The publication has been subject to persistent accusations of political bias from various factions, with critics alleging that its editorial narratives are often influenced by shifting power dynamics rather than objective reporting.

=== Coverage of Bangladesh ===
Anandabazar has faced criticism for its coverage of Bangladesh. A 2017 piece published in The Daily Star (Bangladesh) accused it of "alt-journalism" citing its track record of "outrageous blunders".

In June 2020, the newspaper was heavily criticised for making a derogatory remark about Bangladesh. It later issued a correction in its print version accompanied by an unconditional apology. In December 2024, Anandabazar's story on Bangladesh Army was marked as 'false' by Bangladesh's Chief Adviser of Bangladesh. The publication prompted a protest from Bangladesh's Inter-Services Public Relations (ISPR) which called the report "misleading" and "baseless". In addition, ISPR criticised the newspaper for not following "proper journalistic practice" because of not offering a right of reply. They urged the media to verify information from credible sources before reporting on sensitive issues.

In January 2025, another news report from the publication on Bangladesh Army was identified as 'fake news' by Bangladeshi authorities. In its response Bangladesh's CA Press stated that the story had "no more basis in reality than a Bollywood romcom". The article was removed from its online portal a day after publication.

== See also ==
- List of newspapers in India by circulation
- List of newspapers in the world by circulation
