= Jagadish Chandra Bose Centre for Advanced Technology =

Research centre in Kolkata

- Abbreviation: JCBCAT
- Formation: 2016 June 23; 10 years ago
- Headquarters: Jadavpur University West Annex Campus (erstwhile NIL building), Jadavpur, Kolkata, India
- Parent organisation: Jadavpur University; DRDO

Jagadish Chandra Bose Centre for Advanced Technology (JCBCAT) is a research centre located in Jadavpur, Kolkata, India. It was established in collaboration with Jadavpur University and DRDO in 2016 to conduct research on new age technologies with the main focus on Unmanned and Robotics Technologies, Secured Systems and Cognitive Technologies, Directed Energy Technologies. It was named after prominent Indian Bengali scientist Acharya Jagadish Chandra Bose. Research activities of JCBCAT are managed by DIA-CoE, IIT Kharagpur.

== Formation ==
In 2015, the Jagadish Chandra Bose Centre for Advanced Technology (JCBCAT) was proposed by DRDO in collaboration with Jadavpur University, Kolkata to tackle the limitations of university research and to do larger experiments which could not be done in academic institutions. This was also part of the DRDO's venturing into collaboration with various academic institutes (like JU, CU, ISI) to attract scholars and academics into defence research. In June 2015, it was decided that the research centre will be located in the third campus of JU (known as erstwhile NIL campus), which was leased to JU in 2009.

On 23 June 2016, Defence Research & Development Organisation (DRDO) signed a MoU (Memorandum of Understanding) with Jadavpur University (JU) to establish an advanced research centre. The foundation stone was laid by Dr. S Christopher, secretary of Department of the Defence R&D and Director General of DRDO. 100 crore had been allocated for setting up the research centre. The centre acted as a self accounted unit of DRDO.

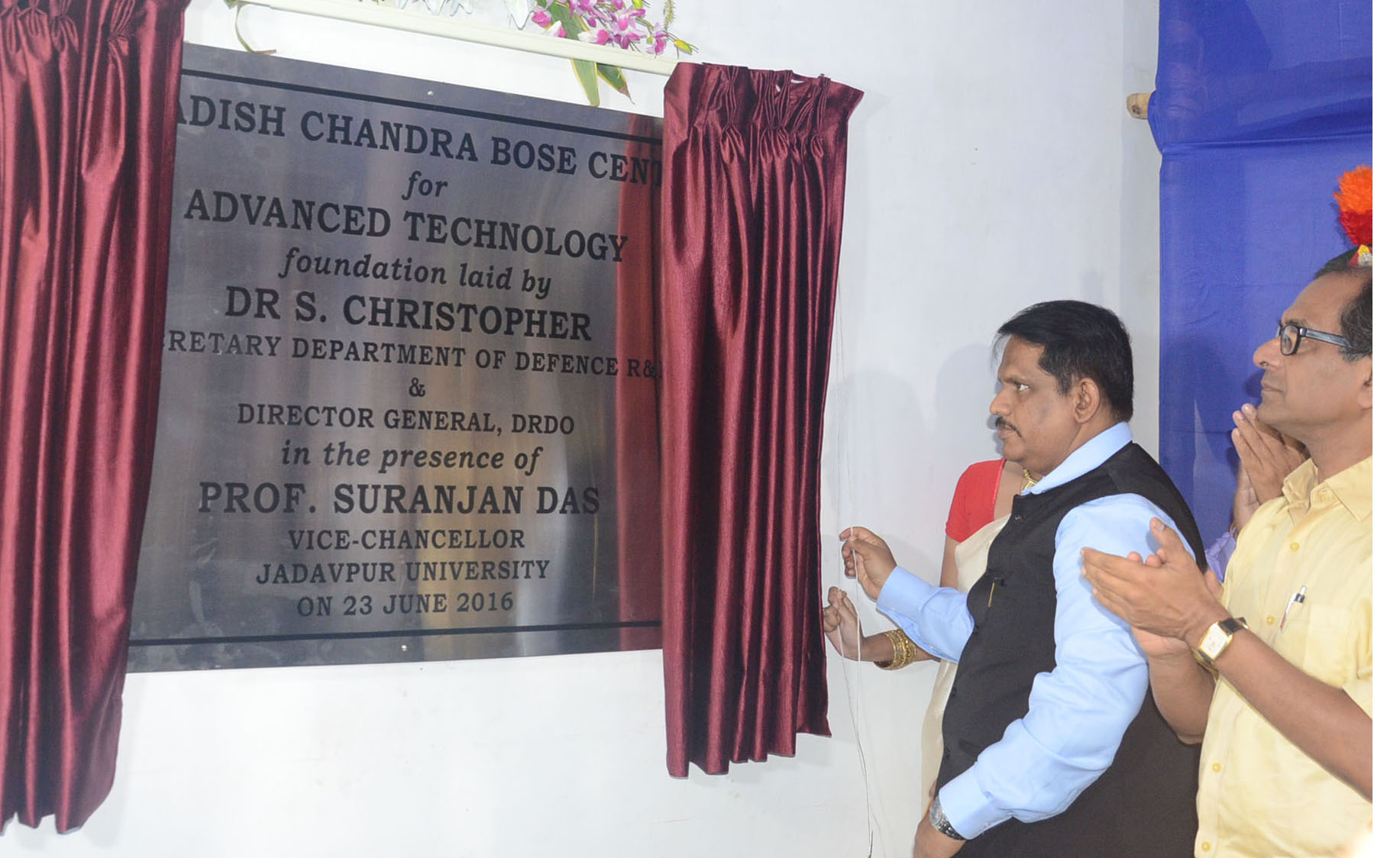
During the inauguration of JCBCAT in Jadavpur University main campus

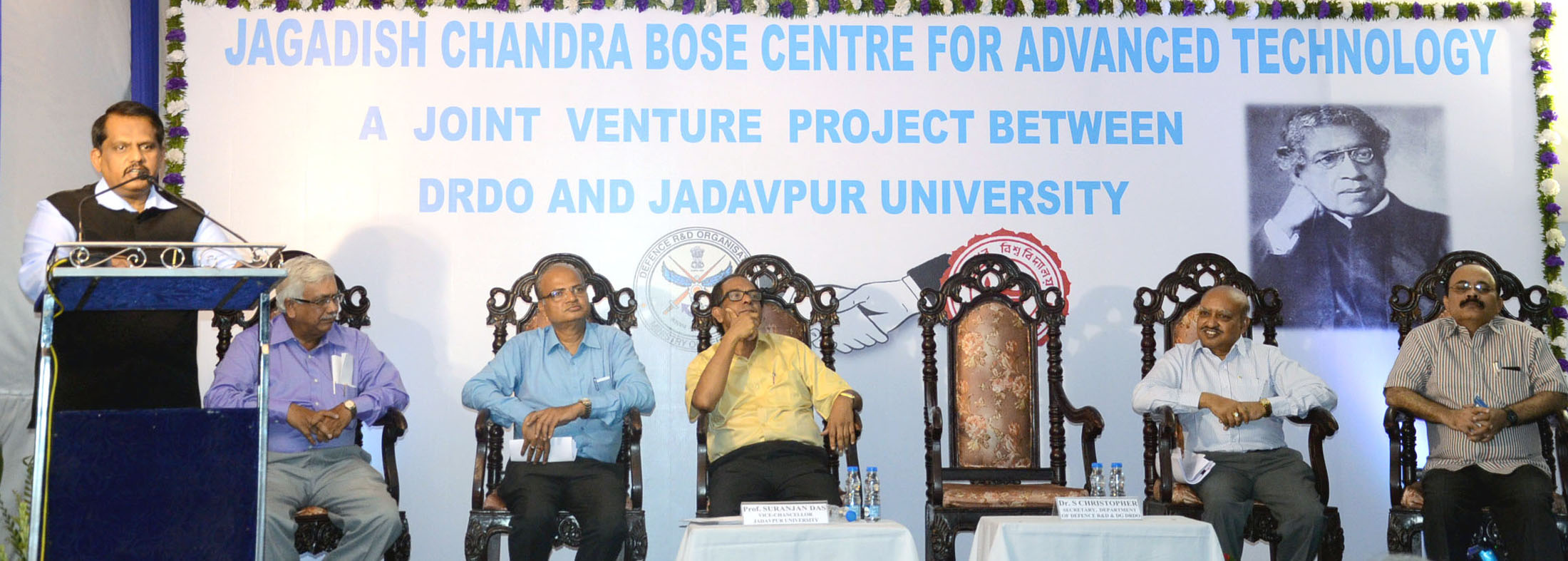
The Secretary, Department of Defence R&D and Director General, DRDO, Dr. S. Christopher addressing at the inauguration of JCBCAT on 23rd June 2016, in presence of the Vice Chancellor, Jadavpur University, Prof. Suranjan Das, the Chief Controller, Defence Research and Development (Technology and Management), DRDO, Shri M. Rahman and other dignitaries.

In 2020, finally, after the redevelopment of the JU third campus, 40% of the campus was subleased to DRDO locating JCBCAT and the rest was kept to JU.

== Research ==
The primary focus of JCBCAT was research in areas of secure systems and cognitive technologies, directed energy, unmanned and robotic technologies, cyber security and other futuristic technologies. Up to 2020, 20 projects were slated to be taken up at the centre and work was started in four or five projects, involving six scientists, including its director G. G. Dutta; four technical officers; two administrative staff members; and 100 research scholars.

Up to 2025, 24 Grants-in-Aid projects were sanctioned to JCBCAT, of which 21 were completed involving 65 professors, 80 researchers, and 63 scientists from DRDO labs.

Although JCBCAT was established as a self-accounting unit of DRDO, it was changed to academia managed DRDO Industry Academia Centre of Excellence (DIA-CoE), being operated from IIT Kharagpur. As of 2025, the research activities of JCBCAT are managed by DIA-CoE, IIT Kharagpur. The projects of JCBCAT were also transferred to DIA-CoE IIT Kharagpur.

DRDO aims to expand the scope of research at JCBCAT by adding new research areas like Underwater Robotics, Cyber physical defence systems and Quality and Reliability and Safety Studies.

== See also ==
- Defence Research and Development Organisation
- Jadavpur University
- IIT Kharagpur
