= Dawn (Indian educationalist magazine) =

Dawn was an English-language magazine launched in 1897 by Indian Bengali educationalist Satish Chandra Mukherjee. The magazine arose at a time of growing nationalism in India and particularly Bengal in the last part of the 19th century, and propagated Mukherjee's views on national education in the context of the emerging nationalist movement in India, and promoted Mukherjee's message of recalling India's cultural and philosophical heritage. The magazine achieved widespread circulation by early 1900s, and particularly criticised the movement towards colonial domination of institutes of higher education that became ratified in the Universities bill, 1904. The magazine was considered a journal of high standard and taste amongst Bengali intelligentsia. The magazine went on to lend its name to a society that arose from a conglomeration of Bengali intellectuals and eminent scientists who contributed to the magazine, and articles appeared on various subjects including Science, technology and similar subjects focussed on the needs in the society. The magazine was published monthly, in English. Each number of the journal was divided into three parts. Lal Mohan Mullick served as the publisher, Mukherjee contributed as editor in a number of Science-themed articles, and in a dedicated column entitled Indiana, he wrote on many aspects of Indian civilisation.
