= Satish Chandra Mukherjee =

Indian educator and freedom fighter (1865–1948)

- Satish Chandra Mukherjee
- Born: 5 June 1865; Banipur,Bengal, British India
- Died: 18 April 1948 (aged 82); Varanasi, Uttar Pradesh, India
- Occupation: Educationist
- Spouse: Charulata Mukherjee

Satish Chandra Mukherjee (5 June 1865 – 18 April 1948) was a pioneer in establishing a system of national education in India, along with Sri Aurobindo Ghosh.

== The positivist background ==
Satish Chandra was born at Bandipur in Hooghly district of present-day West Bengal. His father, Krishnanath Mukherjee, had been a childhood friend and classmate of Justice Dvarkanath Mitra, who appointed Krishnanath as a translator of official documents in the Calcutta High Court. Mitra was a leading believer in the Religion of Humanity as founded by the Positivist Auguste Comte. Adept of this faith, an atheist servant of Man and of society, Krishnanath impressed this ideology on his sons, Tinkori and Satish. Bankim Chandra Chattopadhyay himself was not only one of the first in India to write on Comte and his philosophy but, also, he had zealous Positivist friends like Yogendrachandra Ghose and Rajkrishna Mukherjee; in 1874, Bankim published the latter's article on Positivism in his Bangadarshan, which began with the sentence, "Among the successfully educated classes of our country, there is a great deal of animation concerning the philosophy of Comte." While writing on psychological purification, Bankim wrote: "He who has been psychologically purified is the best Hindu, the best Christian, the best Buddhist, the best Muslim, the best Positivist."

In 1884, in the preface of his novel Devi Chaudhurani, Bankim quoted from the Catechism of Positive Religion: "The general law of Man's progress (...) consists in this that Man becomes more and more religious."

== Early life ==
As a student of the South Suburban School in Bhowanipore in Kolkata, Satish Chandra received inspiration from Ishwar Chandra Vidyasagar and would have a wide range of acquaintances like Ashvinikumar Datta, Sivanath Sastri, Bipin Chandra Pal, Brajendranath Seal, Ashutosh Mukherjee (his class-friend), Rabindranath Tagore, Sri Aurobindo, Raja Subodh Mullick. With his classmate Narendra Datta (Swami Vivekananda) and his friend Kaliprasad Chandra (Swami Abhedananda), he attended the lectures by Pandit Sashadhar Tarka Chudamani on the shaD-darshana ("six schools of Hindu philosophy") at the Albert Hall, presided over by Bankim Chandra Chattopadhyay. "Alive to the necessity and the usefulness of all other systems, secular or religious, Eastern or Western," Satish Chandra's intense religious temperament laid emphasis on the study of Hindu life, thought and faith. He joined the Presidency College to obtained his MA in 1886 and BL in 1890, and enrolled himself as a pleader of the Calcutta High Court. In 1887, he was appointed a lecturer in history and economics in the Berhampore College. In 1895 he founded the Bhagavat Chatuspathi, a first attempt to an alternate system of higher studies.

== The Dawn Society ==
Founder-editor of the Dawn magazine (1897–1913), an organ of Indian Nationalism, in 1902 he organised the "Dawn Society" of culture, to protest against the Report of the Indian Universities Commission, representing the inadequate university education imposed by the Government to fabricate clerks for the merchant offices. "The cry for thorough overhauling of the whole system of University education was in the air.". In 1889, he formulated the scheme for national education.

Dawn occupied an apartment on the first floor of the present Vidyasagar College (formerly known as the Metropolitan Institution: its Principal, Nagendranath Ghosh was the President, and Satish its general secretary). The Dawn Society was "functioning (...) as a training ground of youths and a nursery of patriotism, became in 1905 one of the most active centres for the propagation of Boycott-Swadeshi ideologies..."

In tune with the programme of a new pedagogy introduced by Sri Aurobindo, the Society's object was to draw the attention of the students to the needs of the country, to love Mother India, to cultivate their moral character, to inspire original thinking. It had a weekly session for a "general training course". One of the members, Benoy Kumar Sarkar, considering having lived significantly thanks to Satish Chandra's influence, would remember his ardent message of patriotism and philanthropy rousing the youth to dedicated service; he would also write about the method of Pandit Nilakantha Goswami's explaining the Bhagavad Gita, impressing on the listeners' mind the futility of life and death, the insignificance of the body: the sole thing that counts is Duty, the right Action.

Among active members of the "Dawn" were Sister Nivedita, Bagha Jatin (Jatin Mukherjee), Rajendra Prasad (first President of India), Haran Chakladar, Radha Kumud Mukherjee, Kishorimohan Gupta (principal, Daulatpur College), Atulya Chatterjee, Rabindra Narayan Ghosh, Benoykumar Sarkar, all future celebrities. One day, Satish Chandra heard an inner voice uttering firmly: "God exists."

== The National College ==
The Positivist awaited further light from within. In September, a friend of his, follower of the saint Bijoy Krishna Goswami, told him that the Master wanted him to come. After receiving initiation in September 1893, he learnt from the saint that on completing his present activities, Satish was to leave for Varanasi (Benares) for his spiritual pursuit.

By the side of Subodh Chandra Mullick, in 1906, Satish took a leading part in forming the Council of National Education and became a lecturer in the Bengal National College. In 1907, after Sri Aurobindo's resignation on 2 August 1907 (fearing "that he might be spirited away to prison at any moment, and his association with the National College might cause great damage to the institution"), Satish Chandra succeeded him as principal, and a contributor to the daily Bande Mataram. Four years after Sri Aurobindo's retiring to Puducherry, Satish left for Varanasi in 1914, settled there till his death. Prominent among the regular visitors who consulted him for guidance, there was Malani, Professor of English at the Hindu University, who took profuse notes while listening to Satish Chandra. There were also Madan Mohan Malaviya, Narendra Deva, Jadunath Sarkar.

== Satish Chandra and Gandhi ==
Another professor of the same university, Jivatram Kripalani, introduced him to Mohandas Karamchand Gandhi, who held Satish Chandra so high that whenever Gandhi went to Varanasi, he spent some time with Satish Chandra. At a juncture, it seems Gandhi even approached him for receiving initiation; but Satish Chandra did not feel that Gandhi needed it. Both of them were seekers of God. Gandhi strove to solve the problem of suffering in man's daily life and look for the Truth; Satish Chandra sought after spiritual deliverance.

Following Gandhi's arrest in 1922, he spent two months at the Sabarmati Ashram helping in the management and publication of Young India. Those were years when Gandhi had been moving all over India, without caring for his failing health. One day Satish Chandra was asked by his Guru Bejoykrishna to send Gandhi one hundred rupees every month for his personal use. Gratefully Gandhi accepted this gift. In 1924, hospitalised for appendicitis, whereas Gandhi was flooded with messages of solicitude, he wondered about Satish Chandra's silence and wanted his son Devdas to enquire. The only reply that came was that Satish Chandra knew that Gandhi was going to recover soon.

== The concluding message ==
In the habit of exchanging letters regularly, the last time Satish Chandra wrote to Gandhi was on 24 January 1947, explaining how to repeat the name of Rama with a breath control; happy with that instruction, on 1 February, Gandhi thanked Satish Chandra for "Your lovely letter": on 30 January 1948, Gandhi died by repeating He Rama.

Satish Chandra died on 18 April 1948.
