= Dawn (Bengali educational society) =

The Dawn Society was established in July 1902 in Calcutta, British India under the stewardship of Indian educationalist Satish Chandra Mukherjee. The organisation arose in response to agitation against the report of the Indian Universities Commission 1902 which was seen to be align more power within the Colonial settlers. At a time of rising nationalism in India, the Dawn Society, through its magazine of the same name, sought to promote Indian views, achievements, heritage and success. The members of the society included noted intellectuals and intelligentsia of Bengal of the time, including Rabindranath Tagore, Aurobindo Ghosh, Rajendra Prasad, Raja Subodh Chandra Mullick, Radha Kumud Mukherjee and Brajendra Kishore Roychowdhury and others. The work of the society saw the founding of the National Council for Education in 1905.
