= Institute of Business Management, Jadavpur University =

Institute of Business Management
- Former names: National Council of Education, Bengal
- Type: Public business school
- Established: March 11, 1905; 121 years ago
- Affiliations: Jadavpur University, AICTE
- Director: Prof. (Dr.) Debasis Chanda
- Location: Jadavpur, Kolkata, West Bengal, India; 22.4996°N 88.3698°E
- Campus: Urban
- Nickname: IBMNCE
- Website: Ibmnce.in

Institute of Business Management, commonly known as IBMNCE, is a public business school located in Kolkata, West Bengal India. It is affiliated with Jadavpur University.

== See also ==
- International School of Business, Kolkata
