= J. D. Birla Institute =

College in Kolkata, India

- Motto: "Asato ma sadgamaya tamaso ma jyotirgamaya mrtyorma amrtam gamaya"
- Motto in English: Lead us from all that is untrue and unreal to what is real and true. Lead us from darkness to light, ignorance to knowledge. Lead us from death to immortality.
- Type: Private
- Established: 1962; 64 years ago
- Founder: Sushila Devi Birla
- Accreditation: NAAC
- Academic affiliations: Jadavpur University
- President: Sumangala Birla
- Principal: Tapobrata Ray
- Location: 12, Lower Rawdon Street, Kolkata, West Bengal, India; 22.5388°N 88.3573°E
- Campus: Urban
- Website: www.jdbikolkata.ac.in

The J. D. Birla Institute is a college in Kolkata, West Bengal, India. It is affiliated to Jadavpur University.
