= National Council of Education =

Education organisation in Bengal

National Council of Education, Bengal
- Abbreviation: NCE Bengal
- Formation: 1906
- Founder: Satyendranath Tagore
- Founded at: Raja Subodh Mullick's house, Bengal Presidency, British India
- Type: Educational organisation
- Headquarters: Calcutta, Bengal Presidency, British India
- Region served: Bengal
- First president: Rash Behari Ghosh
- Key people: Subodh Chandra Mullick, Satish Chandra Mukherjee, Aurobindo Ghose, Brajendra Kishore Roy Chowdhury

The National Council of Education - Bengal (or NCE - Bengal) was an organisation founded by Satyendranath Tagore and other Indian nationalists in Bengal in 1906 at Raja Subodh Mullick's house, to promote science and technology as part of a swadeshi industrialisation movement. It established the Bengal National College and Bengal Technical Institute which would later merge to form Jadavpur University. Institutions which were functioning under the council were considered to be hotbeds of swadeshi activities and the government banned nationalistic activities such as the singing of patriotic songs.

== Background ==
University of Calcutta, one of the three universities in modern India, was set up by the British in Calcutta in 1857 as a means of spreading western philosophical thought among the elites in India. Towards the end of the 19th century, a strong nationalist movement and identity arose within the Indian subcontinent, which was particularly prominent in Bengal, which by the start of 1900 had seen the beginnings of the Swadeshi movement, which drew a substantial contribution from the youth of Bengal. Leading nationalists saw the Calcutta University as a predominantly Western Institution. Its focus on Western Themed philosophy and humanities at the expense of Indian ones, and the large number of ICS and administrative officers from amongst its graduates were seen to form the bulwark of British colonialism, and the Calcutta University came to be termed Goldighir Ghulamkhana (the slavehouse by the lake, with reference to a lake beside which the university was situated).

== Dawn society ==
Satish Chandra Mukherjee, a Bengali Indian teacher who taught in the South Calcutta suburb of Bhowanipore, set up in 1895 the Bhagabat Chatushpati. This institute promoted history and understandings of Indian religions and philosophy. In 1897 he founded the Dawn Magazine and in 1902, Mukherjee founded the Dawn society. Through his society and magazine, Mukherjee promulgated Indian philosophies and teachings and criticized the Calcutta University's syllabus for its lack of emphasis on what he believed to be necessary for nation building. Mukherjee's work, in the nascent nationalist sentiments, found support among leading luminaries of Bengal at the time. Soon, the Dawn society was calling for nationalist education with an emphasis on sciences and focus towards Indian values.

== Universities act 1904 ==
Lord Curzon had introduced the Universities act, 1904, much to the chagrin of the native populace of Bengal who saw this as a means to limit access to English educational institutions from the native populations. The government also decided to disaffiliate many private Indian colleges, which had come up lately and were regarded by the Government as hot beds of nationalist agitation. The measures stirred the educated middle class to move for alternative systems of education. The real impetus though was provided by the partition of Bengal by Lord Curzon, the then Governor-General of India, into East Bengal on the one hand (the area that was eventually to become Bangladesh in 1971) and West Bengal and Odisha on the other. The young men of Bengal were amongst the most active in the Swadeshi movement, and the participation of university students drew the ire of the Raj. R.W. Carlyle prohibited the participation of students in political meetings on the threat of withdrawal of funding and grants. The decade preceding these decrees had seen Bengali intellectuals increasingly calling for indigenous schools and colleges to replace British institutions.

== National Council for Education ==
On 10 December 1905, the Landholders Society organized a meeting at Park Street, attended by around 1500 delegates, including Rabindranath Tagore, Aurobindo Ghosh, Raja Subodh Chandra Mullick, Mahendranath Roy and Brajendra Kishore Roychowdhury. The idea of the National Council of Education was mooted here. While in a meeting held on 9 November 1905 at the Field and Academic Club, Subodh Chandra Mullick pledged Rupees one lakh for the foundation of a National University in Bengal. The objective in setting up the institution that was to challenge the British rule over education by offering education to the masses 'on national lines and under national control'. Generous sums of money were also donated by Brojendra Kishore Roy Choudhury, Maharaja Suryya Kanto Acharya Choudhury and Rashbihari Ghosh, who was appointed the first president of the university. Aurobindo served as the first principal of the college. The organisation in its early days was intricately associated with the nascent revolutionary nationalism in Bengal at the time. It was during his time as Principal that Aurobindo started his nationalist publications Jugantar, Karmayogin and Bande Mataram. The student's mess at the college was frequented by students of East Bengal who belonged to the Dhaka branch of the Anushilan Samiti, and was known to be hotbed of revolutionary nationalism, which was uncontrolled or even encouraged by the college.
