= Subodh Chandra Mallik =

Indian nationalist (1879–1920)

Raja Subodh Chandra Basu Mallik
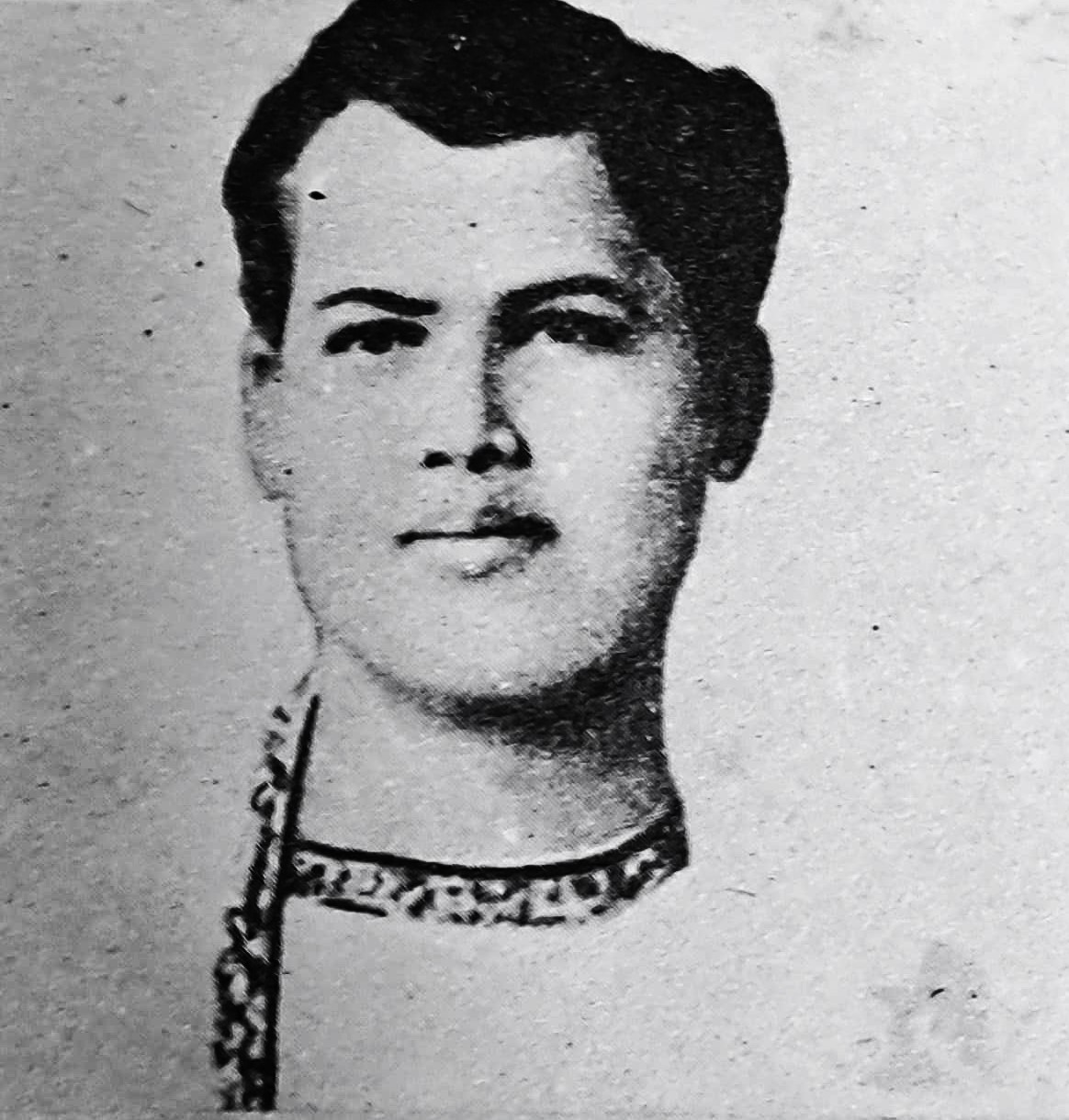
- Born: Subodh Chandra Basu Mallik; 9 February 1879; Calcutta, India
- Died: 14 November 1920 (aged 41); Calcutta, India
- Other name: Raja Subodh Mallik
- Occupation: Indian Nationalist
- Organization: Jugantar
- Known for: Indian independence movement
- Notable work: National Council for Education

Subodh Chandra Basu Mallik (9 February 1879 – 14 November 1920), commonly known as Raja Subodh Mallik, was a Bengali Indian industrialist, philanthropist and nationalist. Mallik is noted as a nationalist intellectual who was one of the co-founders of the Bengal National College, of which he was the principal financial supporter. He was close to Aurobindo Ghosh and financed the latter's nationalist publications, including Bande Mataram.

== Life and works ==
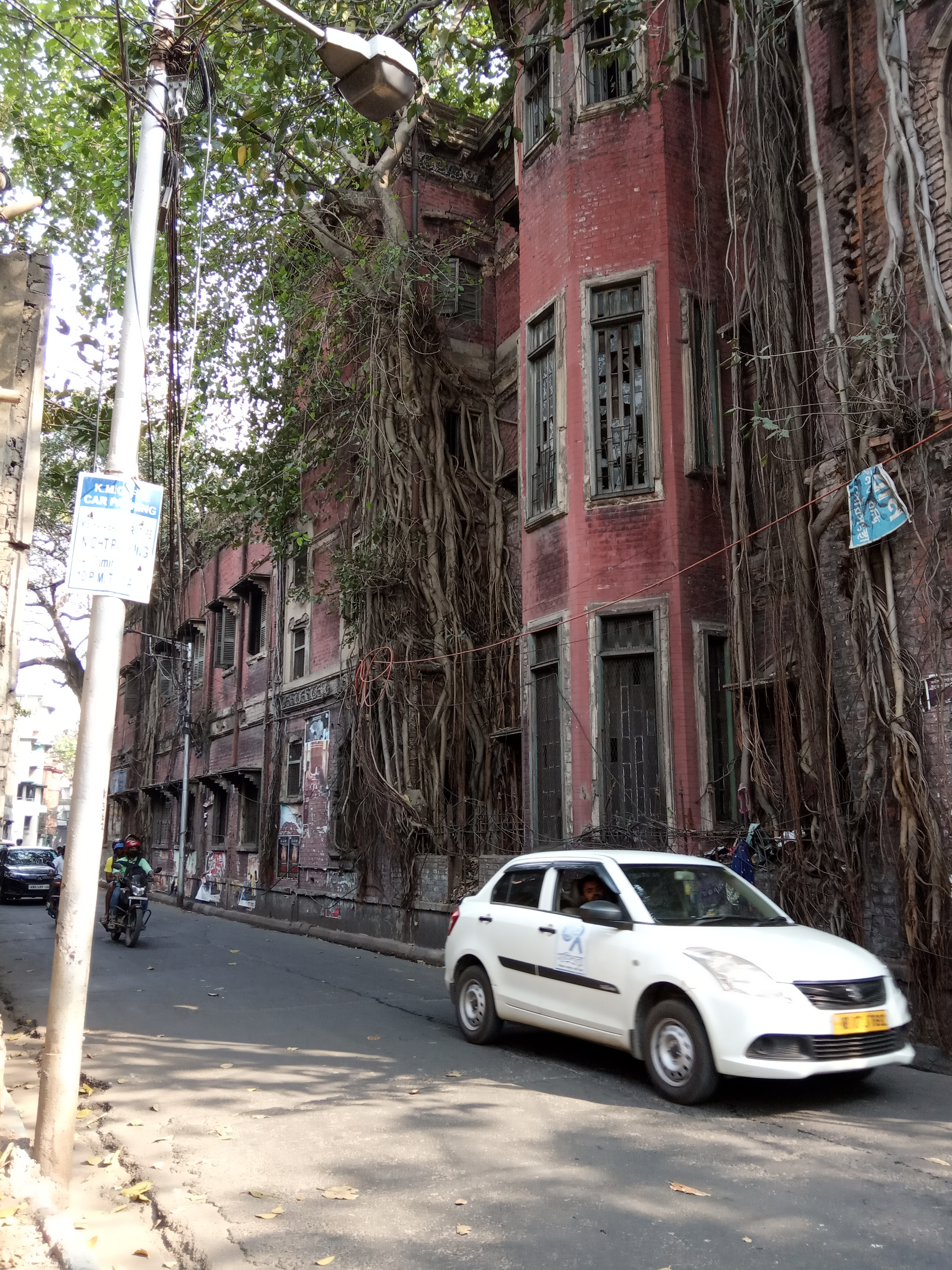
House of Raja Subodh Mallik in Kolkata

Mallik was born in Pataldanga suburb of Calcutta to Prabodh Chandra Basu Mallik. He graduated from St. Xaviers College Calcutta and Presidency College Calcutta before enrolling at Trinity College, Cambridge, in 1900.

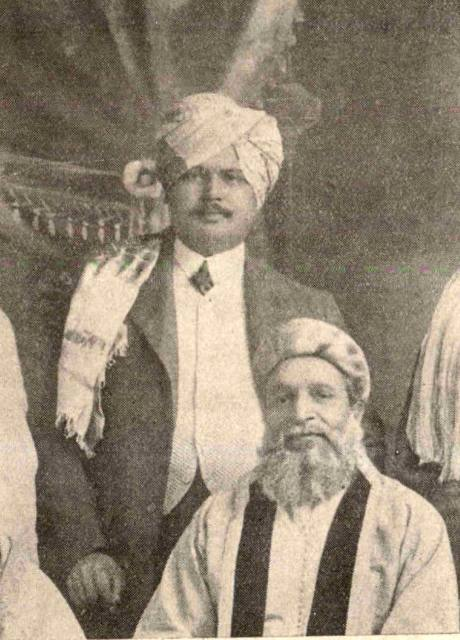
Mallik (standing)

He returned from England before completing his university studies, and immediately delved into the nationalist movement. His palatial house in what was then Wellington Square in Calcutta became a major hub of political activity. In 1906, Mallik was among a group of leading luminaries of Bengal, including Satyendranath Tagore, who founded the National Council for Education to promote science and technology in higher education as part of a swadeshi industrialisation movement. He donated Rs 100,000 to support the new Bengal National College. He also founded the Life of Asia Insurance Company. Mallik's political activities earned him the ire of the Raj, and he was deported in 1908 in the wake of the Alipore Bomb Conspiracy. Mallik's nationalist work and generous support of the movement earned him the colloquial title of Raja from his grateful countrymen.

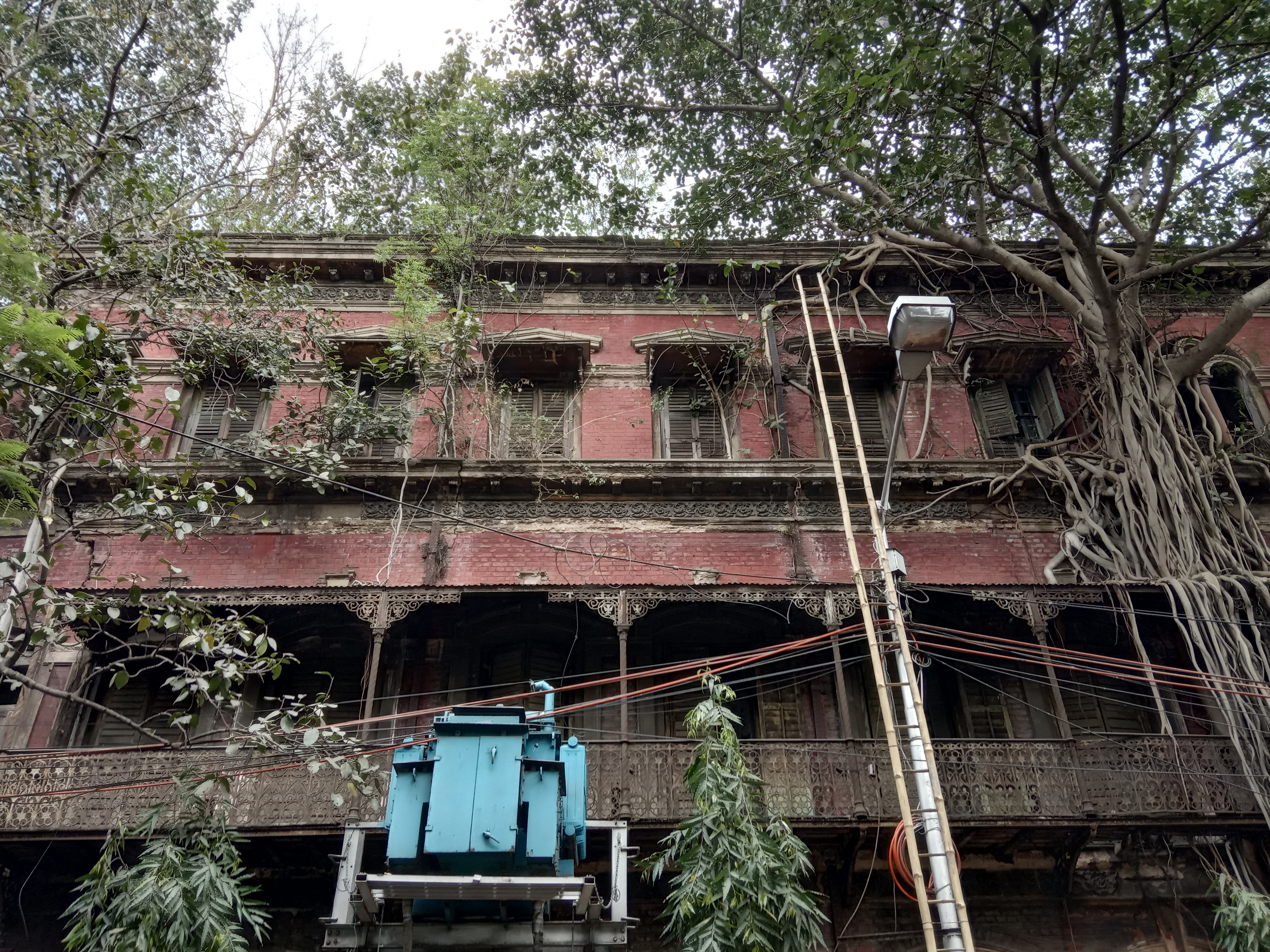
Front view of the house of Raja Subodh Mallik, the great Indian nationalist

In independent India, Wellington Square, the site of his palatial residence, was renamed Raja Subodh Mallik Square, while the road housing Jadavpur University, which emerged from the Bengal National College, is now called Raja Subodh Chandra Mallik Road.
