= Pt. Jawaharlal Nehru Institute of Business Management =

Management College in Madhya Pradesh

Coordinates: 23.1647°N 75.8094°E

Pandit Jawaharlal Nehru Institute of Business Management is located in Ujjain, Madhya Pradesh. The institute was established in the year 1989 under Vikram University. The infrastructure includes features such as e-classes that enable the lecturers to implement knowledge through computerized form, library possessing over 20,000 volumes of books, net labs, campus covering a wide area of 2 acres.

The programs are for working executives as well as for freshers, through case based interactive learning sessions by faculty members drawn from industries, institutes and universities. Students here specialize in Marketing, Systems, insurance, jute, banking, Human Resources, Finance or Project Management. All the courses are approved by All India Council of Technical Education.

== Academics ==
The management programs offered are:

- Bachelors of Business Administration (BBA)
- Master of Business Administration (MBA)
- Master of Business Administration (Part-time)
