= International School of Business, Kolkata =

The International School of Business, Kolkata is a business school in Kolkata, West Bengal, India imparting management education since 2002.

The institute, which is a part of the IndiSmart Group, Kolkata, has a global association with Edinburgh Napier University, UK and academic links with Queen Margaret University in Edinburgh, UK and other universities and centers of excellence worldwide. The campus of the institute is in Bidhannagar, Kolkata, the IT hub of Eastern India, close to the offices of multinational IT companies like IBM, CTS, TCS, WIPRO, PWC, Siemens etc.
