= Jadavpur University =

Public technical and research university in Kolkata, India

- Official Emblem
- Former names: List: Bengal Technical Institute (1906–1910); Central National Institution (1910–1928); College of Engineering and Technology, Bengal (1928–1955)
- Motto: jñātum asti vṛddhiṃ prāpnuyāt
- Motto in English: To Know Is To Grow
- Recognition: AICTE; NCTE; COA
- Type: Public research university
- Established: 25 July 1956; 70 years ago
- Founder: Taraknath Palit
- Accreditation: NAAC; NBA
- Academic affiliations: UGC; AIU; ACU
- Budget: ₹357.50 crore (US$38 million) (FY2026–27 est.)
- Chancellor: Governor of West Bengal
- Vice-Chancellor: Dr. Chiranjib Bhattacharjee
- Pro Vice-Chancellor: Dr. Amitava Datta
- Academic staff: 963 (2025)
- Students: 12,968 (2025)
- Undergraduates: 7,316 (2025)
- Postgraduates: 3,148 (2025)
- Doctoral students: 2,504 (2025)
- Location: Kolkata, West Bengal, India
- Campus: Multiple active campuses: 60 acre (Main campus at Jadavpur); 26 acre (Bidhannagar campus); 7.6 acre (West Annexe Campus at Jadavpur)
- Website: jadavpuruniversity.in

Jadavpur University (abbr. JU) (Bengali: যাদবপুর বিশ্ববিদ্যালয়) is a public state funded technical and research university with its main campus located at Jadavpur, Kolkata, West Bengal, India. It was established on 25 July in 1906 as Bengal Technical Institute and was converted into Jadavpur University on 24 December in 1955. As of the 2025 NIRF rankings, Jadavpur University has been ranked 9th among universities, 1st among state public universities, 18th among engineering institutes, and 18th overall in India. Also Nature Index ranked Jadavpur University in 1st among universities in India and 22nd overall in India in terms of research output (2023–2024). The university has been recognized by the UGC as an institute with "Potential for Excellence" and accredited an "A+" grade by the National Assessment and Accreditation Council (NAAC).

== History ==
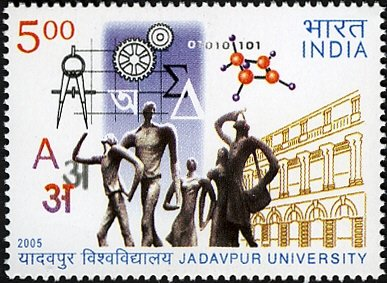
Stamp featuring Jadavpur University

On 25 July 1906, Bengal Technical Institute was founded by Society for the Promotion of Technical Education at 92, Upper Circular Road. On 7 July 1910, the Society for the Promotion of Technical Education in Bengal was merged with the National Council of Education (NCE). The institute became College of Engineering and Technology, Bengal looked after by NCE. After Independence, on 24 December 1955, Jadavpur University was officially established by the Government of West Bengal with the concurrence of the Government of India.

== Campuses ==
=== Main campus ===
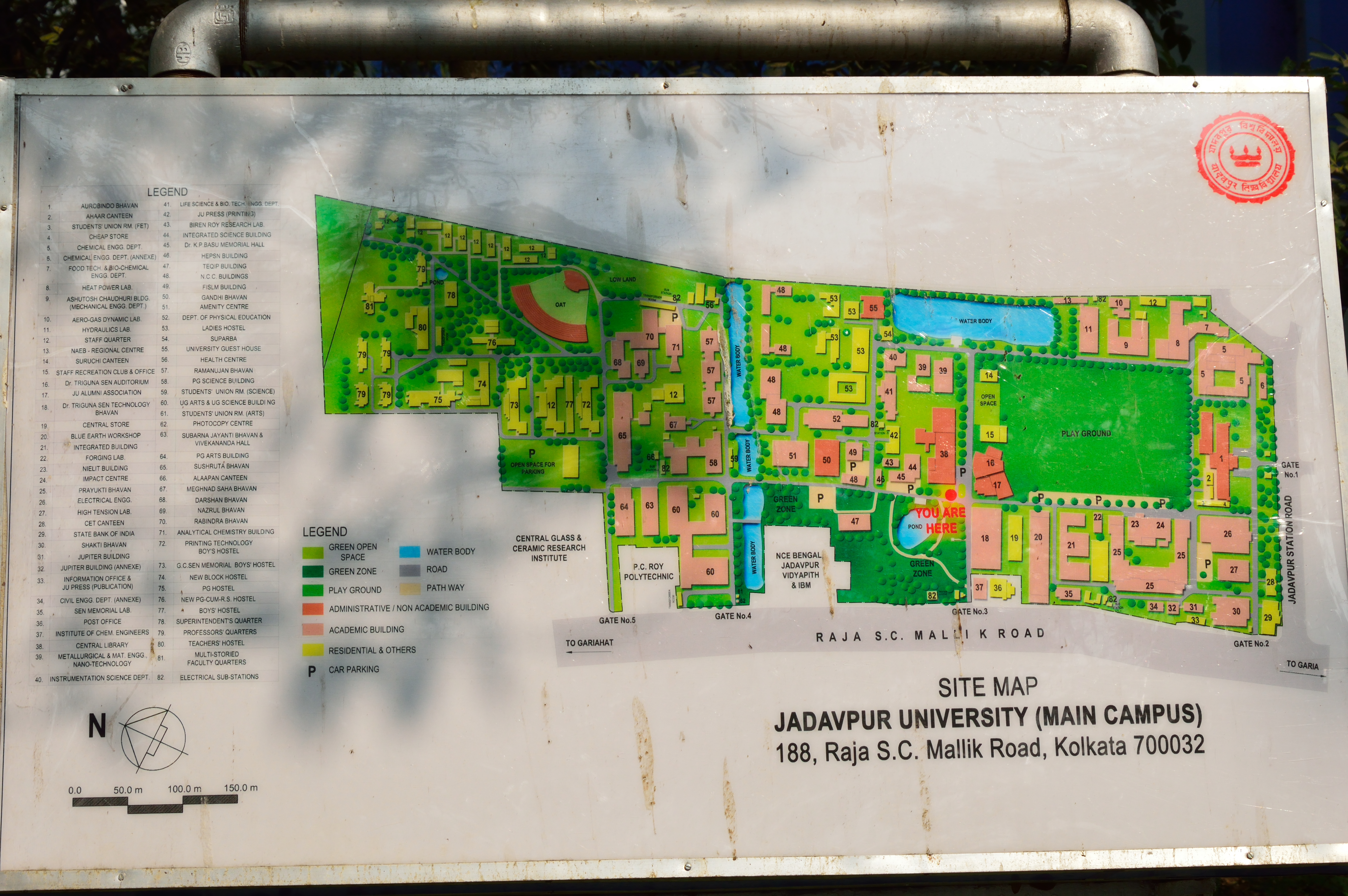
Jadavpur University main campus map (as of 2015)

Jadavpur University's main campus is at Jadavpur, spread over 60 acres. The campus contains major engineering, arts, science and interdisciplinary departments. The 6 Acres sports complex have Badminton court, Tennis court, Kabaddi court and playground for other organising sports like cricket and football. Additionally the university has a six canteens, amenities centre, and guest house, cafeteria, health centre, gymnasium, Pwd centre and other facilities like banks, post office, book shops etc. Although every department/school has its own hall or auditorium, the main campus have 7 auditoriums: Gandhi Bhavan, Triguna Sen Auditorium, K.P. Basu Memorial Hall, Vivekananda Hall, Anita Banerjee Memorial Hall and H.L. Roy Auditorium. The campus also has an Open Air Theatre with a seating capacity of around 3000.

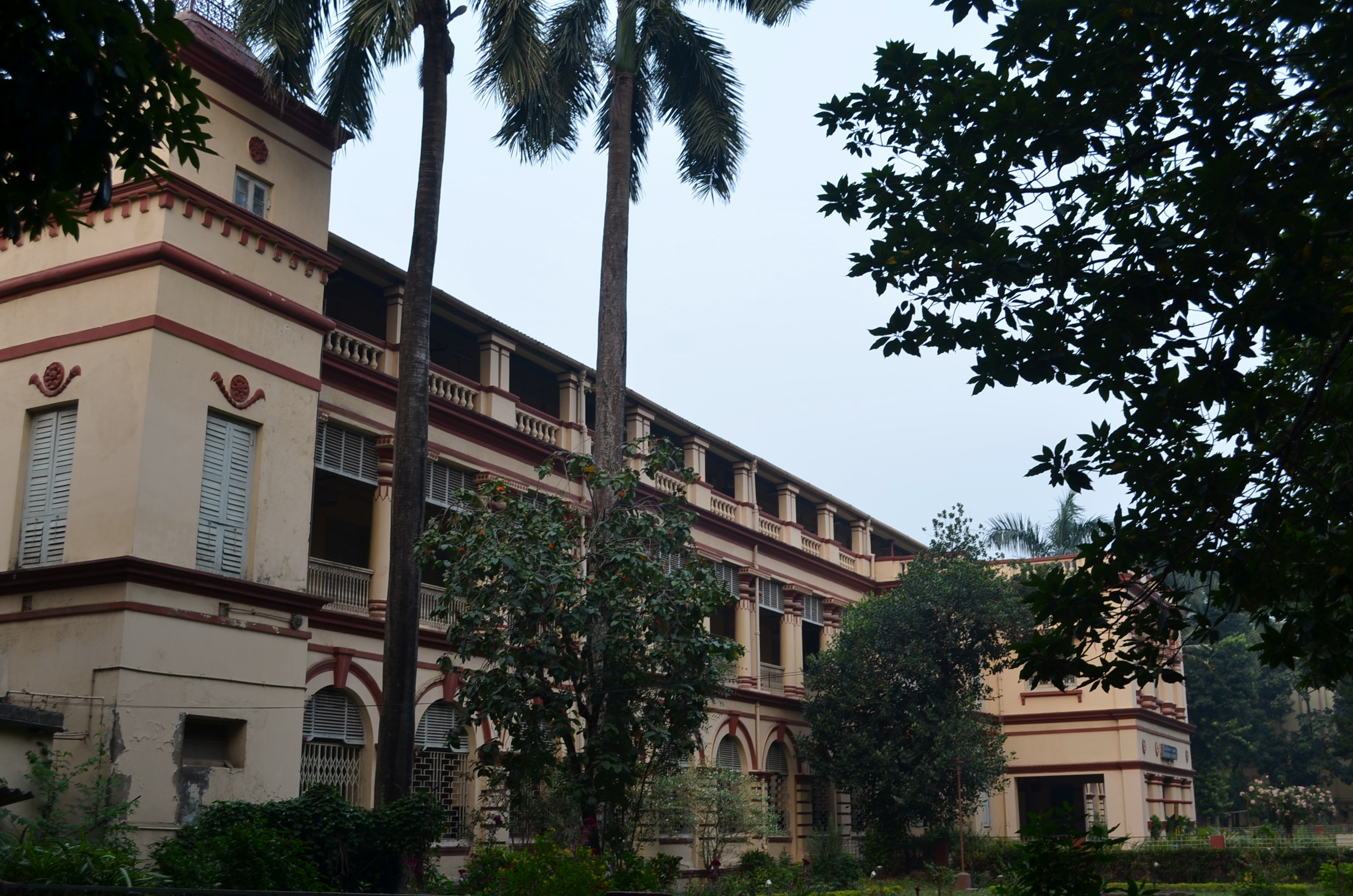
Aurobindo Bhavan

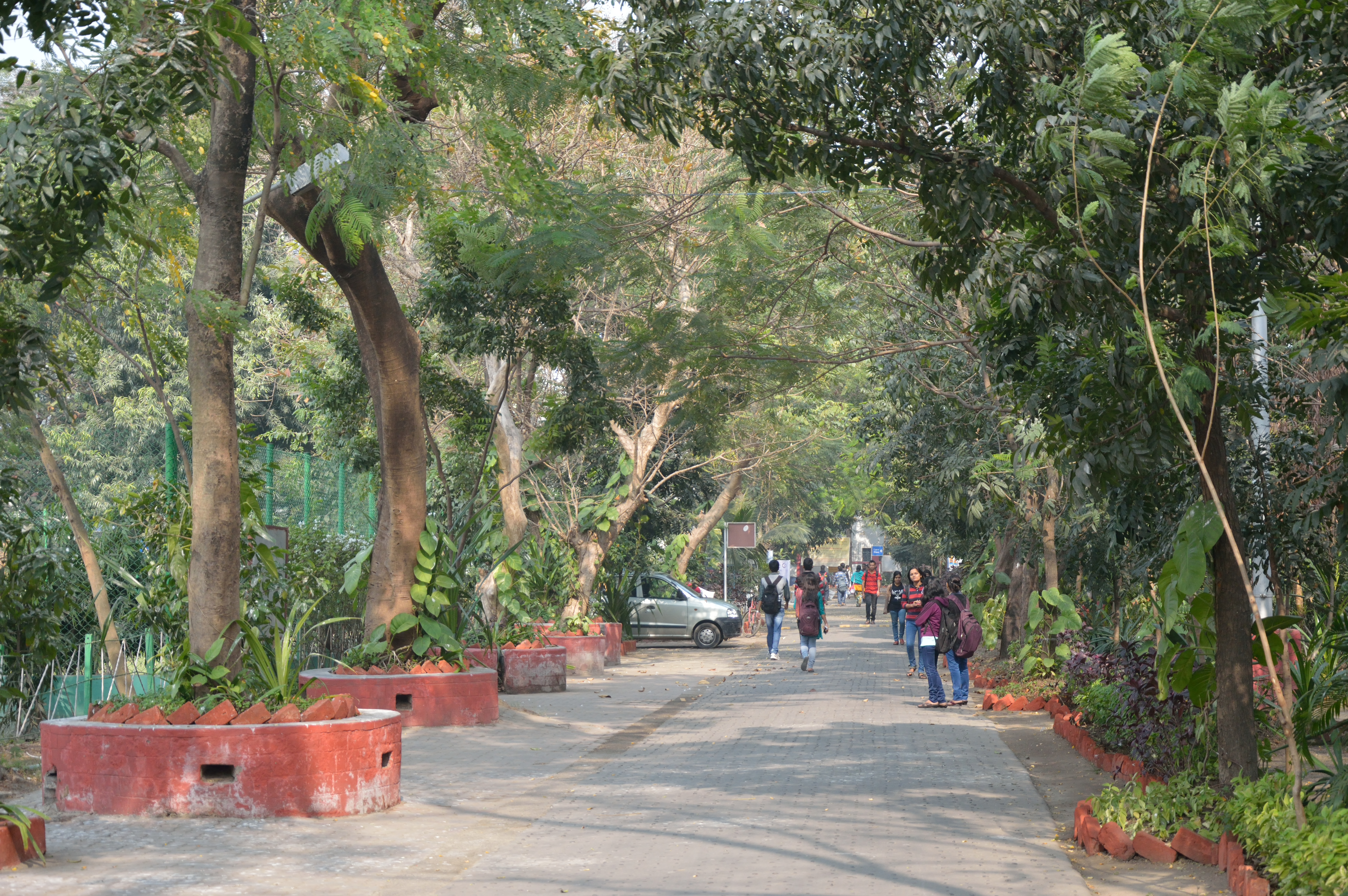
Inside JU Main Campus

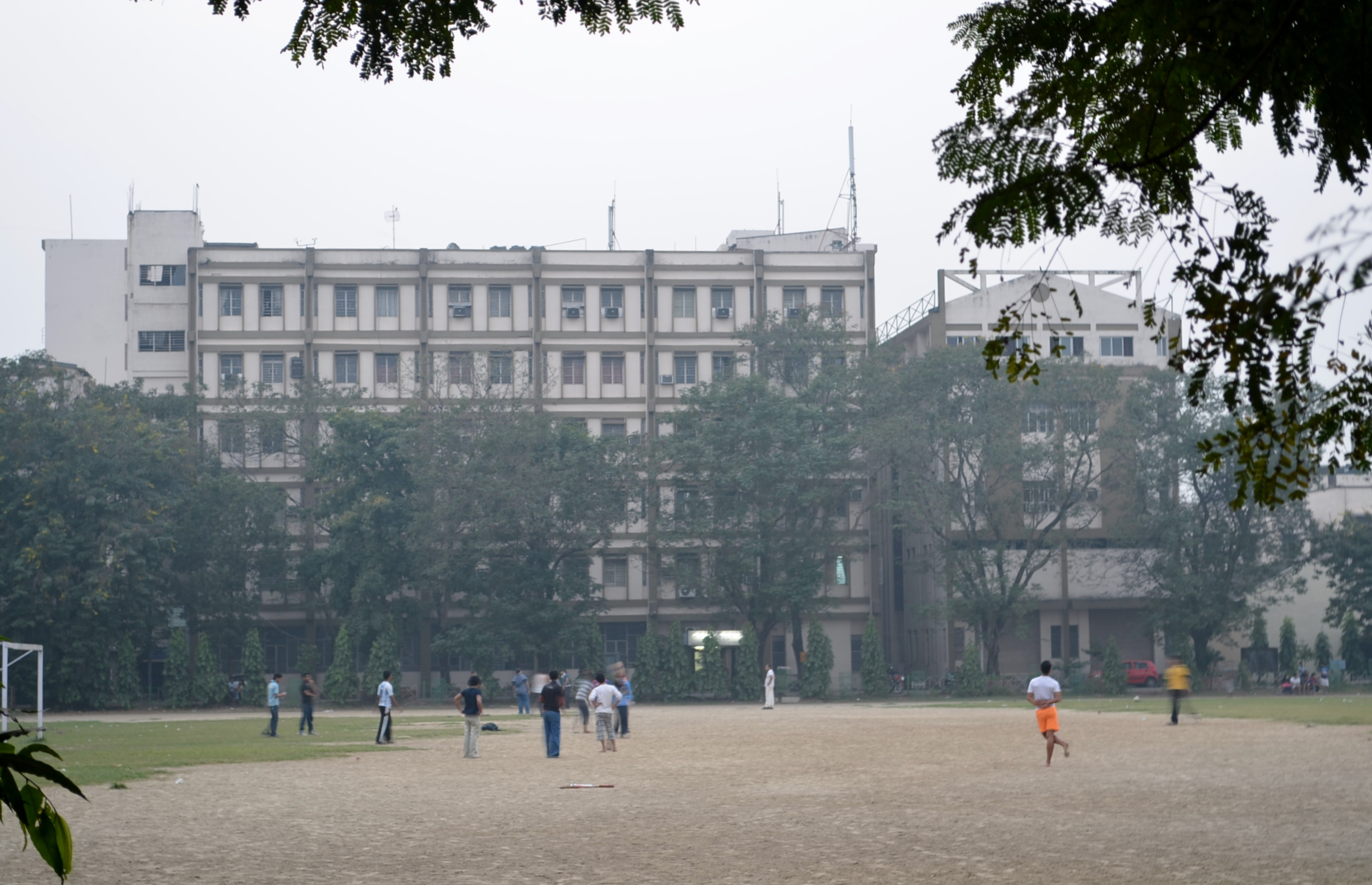
University playground along with Aurobindo Bhavan in the back

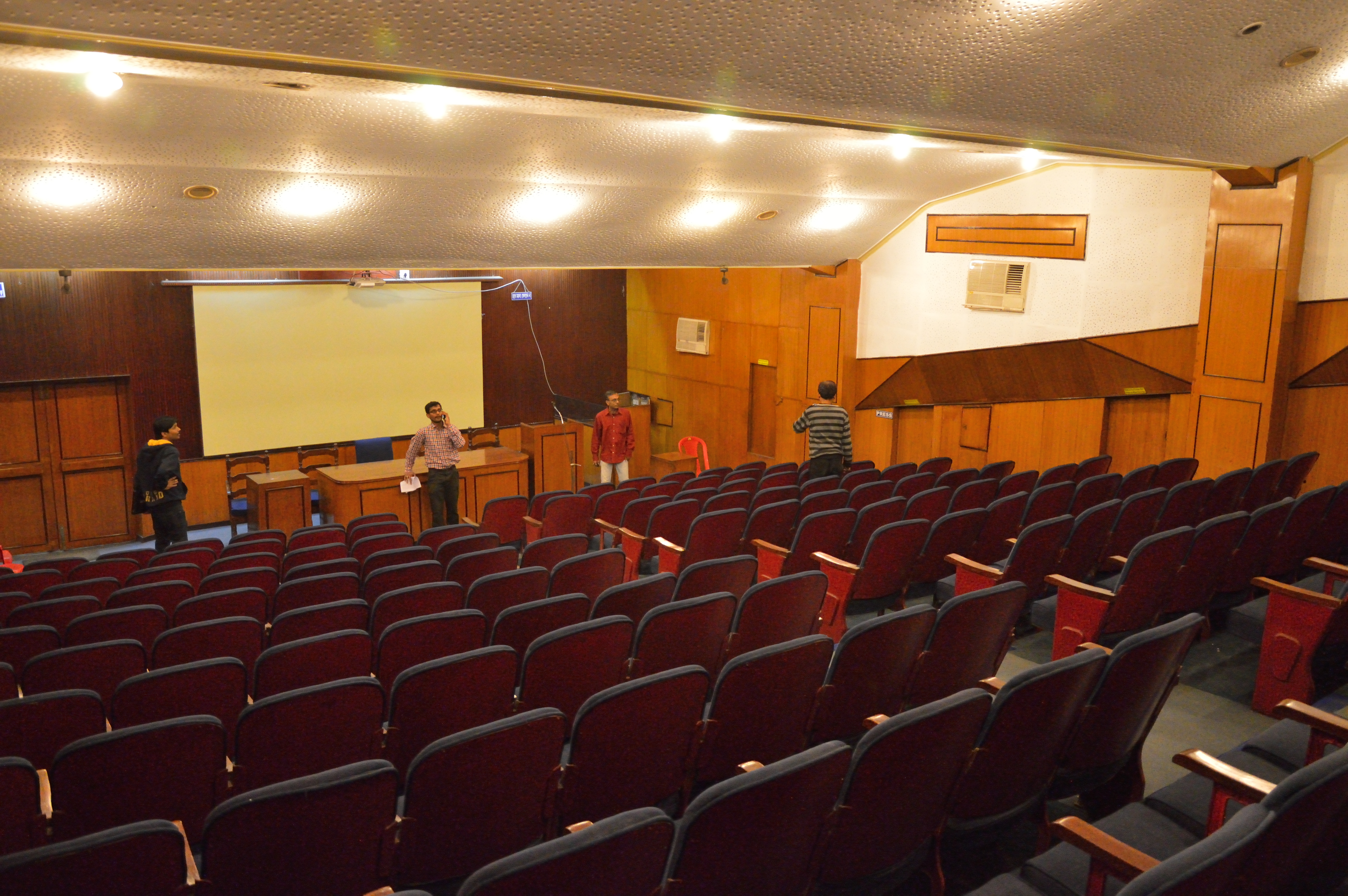
KP Basu Memorial Hall

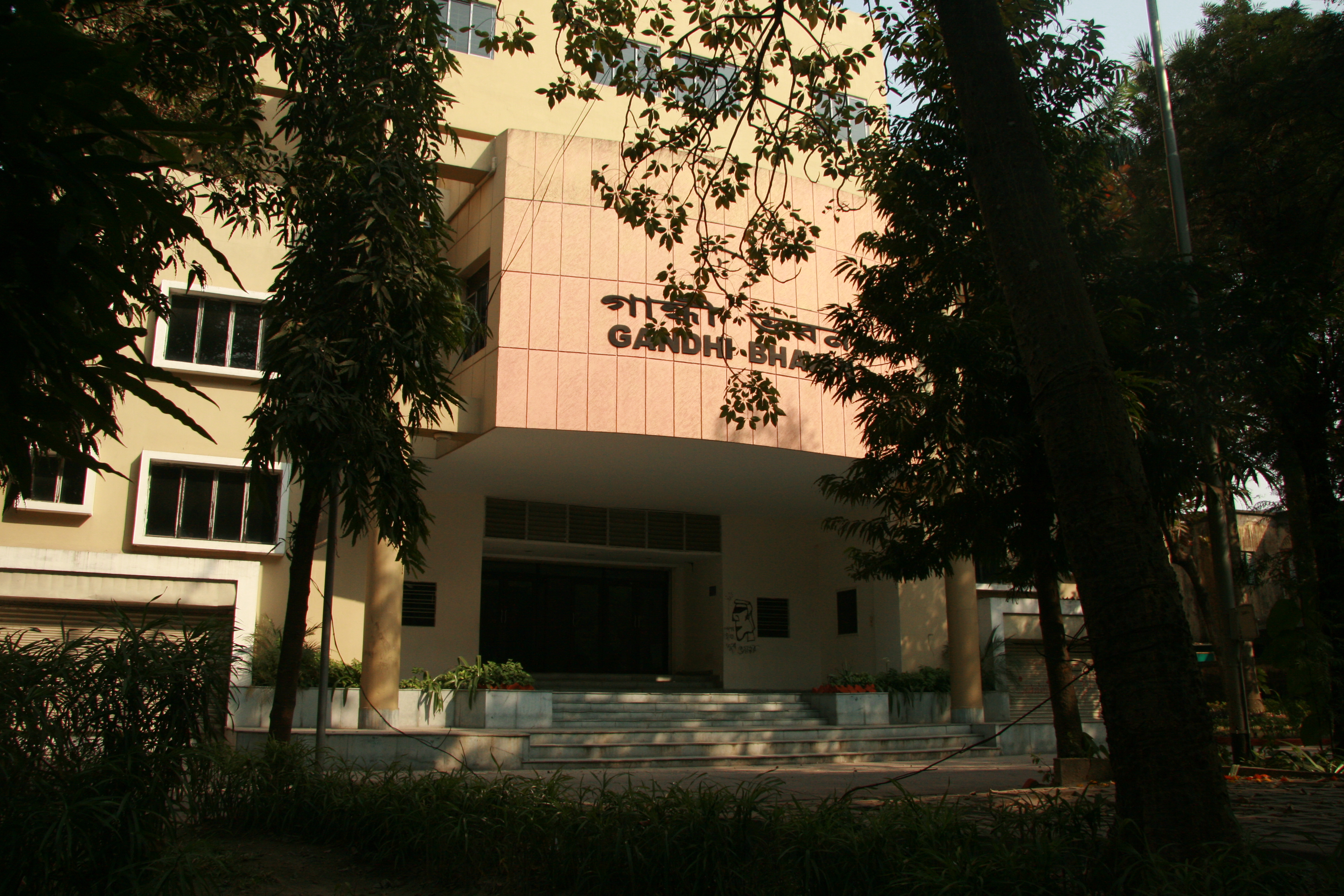
Gandhi Bhavan from outside

=== Salt Lake campus ===
Jadavpur University has its second campus on 26 acres area in Bidhannagar (Salt Lake) Sector-III. There are 5 departments in the campus namely Construction Engineering, Instrumentation and Electronics Engineering, Printing Engineering, Information Technology and Power Engineering. The Eastern Regional Offices of the UGC and the Inter-University Consortium for Atomic Energy are also located on this campus. Jadavpur University Campus Ground is located in this campus.

=== West Annexe campus at Jadavpur ===
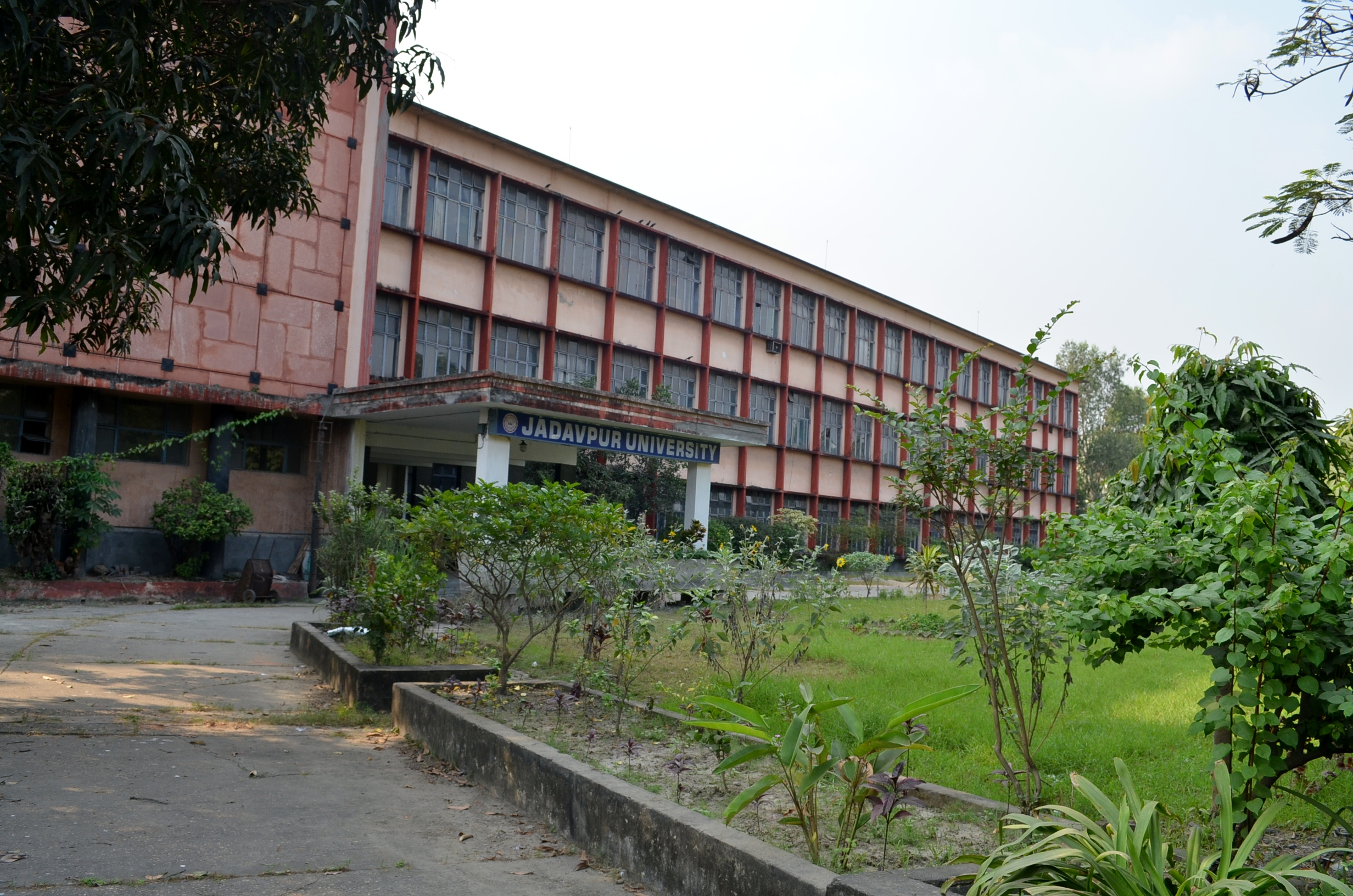
Erstwhile NIL campus, Jadavpur University

On 1 January 2009, Jadavpur University took over National Instruments Limited, a former PSU under Department of Heavy industries, GOI on a 297-year lease. From 2014, the campus is used as a research hub of the university and known as West Annexe campus. Research institutes like DRDO and CSIR also operate from the campus. A portion of land and building of the campus is leased out to DRDO for long term, which is the 40 percent of the space. At that, the Jagadish Chandra Bose Centre for Advanced Technology (JCBCAT) is established by collaboration of JU and DRDO.

The regional centre of "National Afforestaion & Eco-Development Board" is also located in the campus.

=== New Town campus ===
In 2018, the State Government announced to provide 5 acre land parcel in New Town, Kolkata for creating another campus. In January 2021, the land was handed over to Jadavpur University. In July 2024, a committee was formed and DPR preparation started. Funds were requested for its implementation. State-of-the-art facilities along with research laboratories, a convention centre, international hostel and AI laboratory are planned on the campus.

== Administration ==
The administrative framework operates under a combination of statutory bodies, executive leadership, faculty councils, and various specialized cells. The university's top-level decision-making body is the Executive Council, which, along with the Court and the Faculty Councils, forms the legislative backbone of the university's governance. Governor of West Bengal is the Chancellor of the university. Rest administration includes Vice-Chancellor, Pro-Vice-Chancellors, Registrar, Controller of Examinations, Chief University Engineer etc. Each academic department also maintains internal committees such as the Academic Audit Cell, Departmental Purchase Committees, and Program Quality Improvement Cells (PAQIC). Other administrative positions include Dean of Students, Director of Youth Welfare. Specialized offices and units include Placement and Training Office, Medical Superintendent and Health Unit, RTI Cell and Documentation Office, Internal Complaints Committee (ICC), Equal Opportunity Cell and SC/ST/OBC Cells, Entrepreneurship Development Cell.

== Affiliated institutes ==
In addition to being a unitary university, other institutes like the J. D. Birla Institute, and the Institute of Business Management are affiliated to it, which operate out of independent campuses. While these institutes have their own independent curriculum as well as examination systems, the final degree is awarded by Jadavpur University. Jadavpur University also offers Ph.D. degree to the following institutes: Saha Institute of Nuclear Physics; School of Tropical Medicine, Kolkata; VECC (Bhabha Atomic Research Centre), Kolkata; Indian Institute of Chemical Biology; Central Glass and Ceramic Research Institute; Bose Institute; Kolkata; Jute Technological Research Laboratory; Chittaranjan National Cancer Research Centre; S. N. Bose National Centre for Basic Sciences.

== Academics ==
=== Departments and schools ===
As of 2023, Jadavpur University has 37 Departments and 21 Schools of interdisciplinary studies.

Faculty	Departments	Campus
Faculty of Engineering & Technology	Mechanical Engineering; Chemical Engineering; Civil Engineering; Computer Science & Engineering; Metallurgical & Material Engineering / Electrical Engineering; Architecture; Food Technology & Bio-Chemical Engineering; Pharmaceutical Technology; Electronics & Telecommunication Engineering; Production Engineering	Main campus
Faculty of Engineering & Technology	Information Technology; Instrumentation and Electronics Engineering; Power Engineering; Construction Engineering; Printing Engineering	Salt Lake campus
Faculty of Science	Mathematics; Physics; Geography / Chemistry; Geological Sciences / Instrumentation Science; Life science & Bio-technology	Main campus
Faculty of Arts	Bengali; Comparative Literature; Economics; Education; Sanskrit / English; Film Studies; History; International Relations; Sociology / Library and Information Science; Philosophy; Physical Education	Main campus
Faculty of Interdisciplinary Studies, Law & Management	Adult and Continuing Education & Extension	Main campus

To facilitate interdisciplinary learning and research in diverse fields, there are a number of schools.

Faculty	Schools
Faculty of Interdisciplinary Studies, Law & Management	School of Advanced Studies in Industrial Pollution Control; School of Automotive Engineering; School of Bio-Science and Engineering; School of Cognitive Science; School of Cultural Texts and Records; School of Education Technology; School of Energy Studies; School of Environmental Radiation and Archaeological Sciences; School of Environmental Studies; School of Illumination Science, Engineering and Design; School of International Relations and Strategic Studies (SIRSS); School of Languages and Linguistics; School of Laser Science and Engineering; School of Materials Science and Nanotechnology; School of Media Communication & Culture; School of Mobile Computing and Communication; School of Natural Product Studies; School of Nuclear Studies and Application; School of Oceanographic Studies; School of Water Resource Engineering; School of Women's Studies

=== Centre for Studies ===
To facilitate interdisciplinary learning and higher research in diverse fields, there are nearly fifty Centre for Studies.

Centre for Studies
- Centre for African Literatures and Cultures
- Centre for Ambedkar Studies
- Centre for Canadian Studies
- Bio Equivalence Centre
- Centre for African Literatures and Culture
- Centre for Studies in Islamicate Asia
- Centre for Counselling Services and Studies in Self-Development
- Centre for Theatre Studies
- Centre For Advanced Study
- Centre for Computer-Aided Design
- Centre for Knowledge Based Systems
- Centre for Distributed Computing
- Centre for European Studies
- Centre for Experiments in Social & Behavioral Sciences
- Centre for Human Settlement Planning
- Centre for Marxian Studies
- Centre for Mathematical Biology and Ecology
- Centre for Medicinal Food and Applied Nutrition
- Centre for Microprocessor Applications for Training, Education and Research
- Centre for Plasma Studies
- Centre for Quality Construction
- Centre for Quality Management System
- Centre for Refugee Studies
- Centre For Rural & Cryogenic Technologies
- Centre for Sri Aurobindo Studies
- Centre for Surface Science
- Centre for The Study of Religion and Society
- Centre for Translation of Indian Literatures
- Centre for Victorian Studies
- Centre of Indology
- Condensed Matter Physics Research Centre Embedded System in Instrumentation
- Hariprasanna Biswas Centre for India-China Cultural Studies
- IC Design and Fabrication Centre
- IMPACT Centre
- Latin American Literature & Culture Language Studies
- Nuclear and Particle Physics Research Centre
- Rabindra Studies
- Relativity and Cosmology Research Centre
- Sir C V RAMAN Centre for Physics and Music
- Swami Vivekananda Centre for Technical Manpower Development
- Transportation Studies
- V. Ravi Chandran Centre for Pharmaceutical Sciences
- Welding Technology Centre
- Yoga Centre
- Centre For Disaster Preparedness & Management
- Centre For Digital Library and Documentation

=== Library ===
The Central Library at Jadavpur campus occupies 41,500 square feet (3,860 m^{2}) and houses 646,296 books, 80,700 bound volumes of journals, and 13,000 theses and dissertations, 37,000 items of non-book materials such as reports pamphlets, maps and micro-forms and 1,159 print and 1,448 online journals. The library also has access to around 3,000 online journals more through INFLIBNET and INDEST Consortia. In total, the University Library has access to around 11,000 Journals. The library subscribes to 30 databases which include Scopus, Econlit etc. and also about 10,000+ E-books (as of 2018). The Salt Lake campus has a library with 6,500 sq. ft. of space.

=== Journals ===
Jadavpur University has multiple scholarly journals. The list of journals are given below.

Journal name	Department/School	Type	First published	Notes
Jadavpur Journal of Comparative Literature	Department of Comparative Literature	Peer reviewed, annual	1961	First journal on Comparative Literature in India
Anviksa	Department of Sanskrit	Peer reviewed, annual	1966	
Jadavpur University Essays and Studies	Department of English	Peer reviewed, annual	1972	
Jadavpur Journal of International Relations	Department of International Relations	Peer reviewed, bi-annual	1996	Collaboration with Sage Publications
Jadavpur Journal of Languages and Linguistics	School of Languages and Linguistics	Peer reviewed, bi-annual, open access	2017	listed in UGC-CARE
Anushilan, Journal of Physical Education Yoga and Sports	Department of Physical Education	Annual	2020	
JU Journal for Communication, Society and Outreach	Department of Adult and Continuing Education & Extension	Peer reviewed, bi-annual	2024	

== Notable works and contributions ==
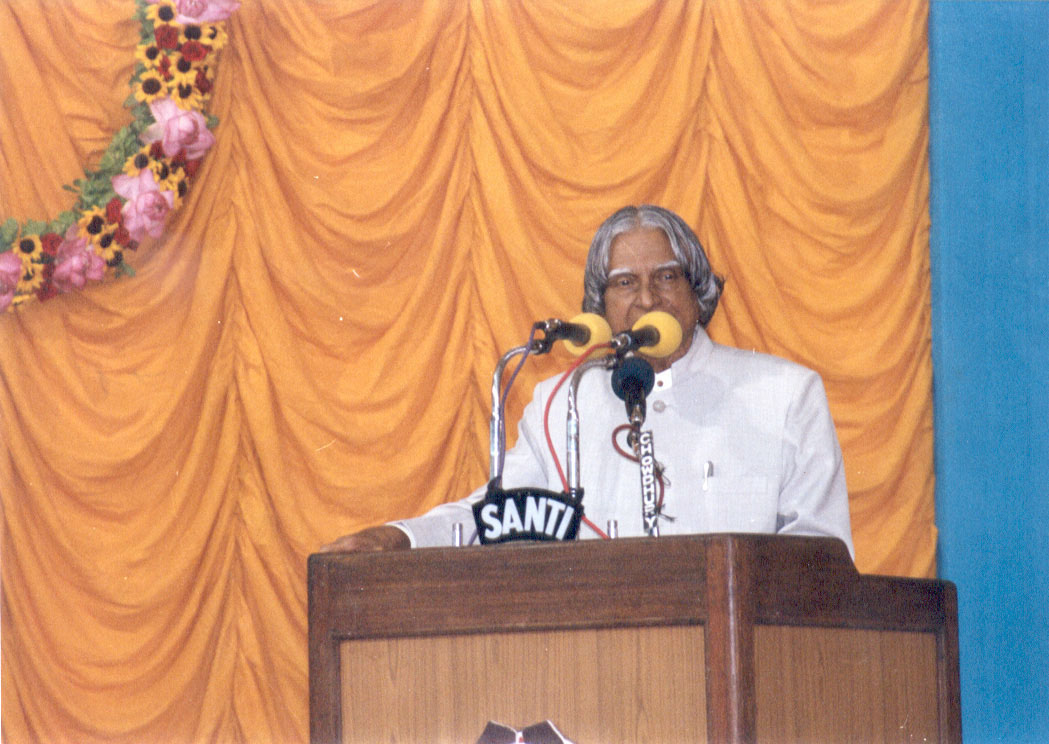
Former President of India Dr. A.P.J. Abdul Kalam acknowledged Jadavpur University's contributions and termed as "The future Nalanda of India" while addressing the Golden Jubilee Celebrations of the University on 14 July 2005.

=== Science and technology ===
Jadavpur University's High Energy Physics Group, Nuclear & Particle Physics Research Centre which comes under Department of Physics has been awarded the status of "Associate Membership" of ALICE – INDIA Collaboration and CERN (European Council for Nuclear Research) – ALICE (A Large Ion Collider Experiment) Collaboration and received a grant of Rs. 1,115 crores. In 2025, the group won "2025 Breakthrough Prize in Fundamental Physics" along with $3 million.

Jadavpur University has multiple collaborations with Indian Space Research Organisation (ISRO) and Defence Research and Development Organisation (DRDO). In 2023, two professors from Jadavpur University were involved in a soft-landing project named "RESPOND" for a planetary mission sponsored by ISRO. JU researchers have worked with DRDO for a long time with having involvement in DRDO's Indian Ballistic Missile Defence Programme and Tejas project. Some crucial equipments have been developed in JU. Jadavpur University also contributes to the satellite launch vehicle programme of ISRO and LCA programme of DRDO. For furthermore research, Jagadish Chandra Bose Centre for Advanced Technology (JCBCAT) was established in 2016, which is now located in the West annex campus of JU.

The Global Change Programme at Jadavpur University (GCP-JU) is active at the Intergovernmental Panel on Climate Change (IPCC). It has also worked with Ministry of Environment, Forest and Climate Change towards the preparation of NATCOM (National Communication) for United Nations Framework Convention on Climate Change (UNFCCC). A joint open energy modelling project was initiated by GCP-JU in collaboration with Indian Institute of Science (Bengaluru), and the Environmental Defense Fund (US). Since 2020, they are also collectively developing a comprehensive energy model and evaluate alternative decarbonization strategies and pathways for future India.

Some major research ventures undertaken by School of Environmental Studies are highlighting the presence of arsenic in groundwater in countries like India and Bangladesh and the development of the first alcohol based car by the School of Automobile Engineering.

In March 2011, Indian American scientist Manick Sorcar assisted in the opening of a laser animation lab under the School of Illumination Science, Engineering and Design. The DTC Laboratory at Jadavpur University has been involved in Cheminformatics/QSAR research since 2002, and the laboratory has developed techniques like q-RASAR, ARKA descriptors in QSAR, ETA (a topological index) and many QSAR tools which are hosted in DTC Lab Tools site and DTC Lab Supplementary Tools site.

JU in collaboration with ISI Kolkata developed the first second-generation digital computer of India, namely ISIJU-1 in 1964. The project was headed by Samarendra Kumar Mitra of the Computing Machines and Electronics Laboratory of ISI and Prof. Jnan Saran Chatterjee, founder head of the Department of Tele-Communication Engineering (renamed as Department of Electronics and Tele-Communication Engineering (ETCE) in 1964) of JU. Dr. Biswajit Nag, lecturer from ETCE department was responsible for the logic design and implementation of the main memory systems. A number of faculties and research scholers were also involved in the hardware team.

=== Industry ===
Jadavpur University's Innovation Council (IIC) was established in 2018 to promote innovations and startups in the campus. IIC arranges awareness programmes, seminars and workshops on innovation and entrepreneurship and organises visits to industries and start-ups for the first year students. The university hosted a HULT event. IIC participated in Bengal Global Business Summit (BGBS) 2022, Smart India Hackathon (SIH) 2022. Three alumni members from JU has successfully established their startups by enlisting in startup MSME venture. Four Memorandum of Understandings (MOUs) have been signed with companies like Garden Reach Shipbuilders and Engineers, Haldia Petrochemicals Limited, MCPI Private Limited and Nexgen Plasma Private Limited for student internships. Jadavpur University organised SERB-INAE Hackathon 2022, in which nearly 100 students from all over India participated.

The university also has an Industry-Institute Partnership Cell (IIPC) in which consultancy and testing services are provided to industry, service sectors and other public or private organizations. During 2022–2023, the IIPC generated a revenue of Rs 13.5 crores. Up to 2023, the IIPC has worked with around 161 leading industries or organisations like Tata Steel, RITES, Airport Authority of India, Kolkata Port Trust, Bajaj Electricals, L&T, KMC and KMDA, Rail Vikas Nigam Ltd., CPCB, CESC etc.

== National and international rankings ==
The rankings of Jadavpur University by various National and International organisations are as follows:

Indian rankings
NIRF
Category	2025	2024	2023	2022	2021
Overall	18	17	13	12	14
University	9	9	4	4	8
State public university	1	2			
Engineering	18	12	10	11	17
Research	23	21	19	13	
Pharmacy	24	18	18	18	
NISTADS
Category	2021				
h-index of publication	4 (among 50)				

International
Category		2026	2025	2024	2023	2022
QS World University Rankings
World		676	721-730	741-750	701-750	651-700
Asia		214	211	228	182	162
World ranking by subject
World ranking by subject	English Language and Literature	151-200	201-250	201-250	251-300	251-300
World ranking by subject	Philosophy	201-225	150-200			
World ranking by subject	Linguistics	301-350				
World ranking by subject	Politics	301-400				
World ranking by subject	Engineering - Chemical	301-350	301-350	301-350	301-350	351-400
World ranking by subject	Pharmacy and Pharmacology	301-350	351-400	301-350	301-350	301-350
World ranking by subject	Chemistry	401-450	351-400	401-450	401-450	451-500
World ranking by subject	Materials Sciences	351-400	351-400	351-400	351-400	301-350
World ranking by subject	Engineering - Mechanical	301-350	351-400	301-350	401-450	451-500
World ranking by subject	Physics and Astronomy	351-400	401-450	401-450	451-500	551-600
World ranking by subject	Engineering - Electrical and Electronic	351-400	401-450	401-450		
World ranking by subject	Computer Science and Information Systems	401-450	451-500	451-500	601-650	
World ranking by subject	Mathematics	401-450	451-500			
World ranking by subject	Economics and Econometrics	401-450	451-500	401-450	401-450	
World ranking by subject	Engineering and Technology	451-500	451-500			
World ranking by subject	Natural Sciences	451-500	451-500	451-500		
Times Higher Education World University Rankings
World		1001-1200	1001-1200	1001-1200	1001-1200	801-1001
Asia			301-350	251-300	351-400	251-300
World ranking by subject
World ranking by subject	Arts and Humanities	801-1000	801+			
World ranking by subject	Engineering	801-1000	801-1000	601-800	601-800	601-800
World ranking by subject	Physical Science	801-1000	801-1000	801-1000	801-1000	801-1000

Other international ranking and recognitions include:

- In the 2025 edition of the "List of top 2% global scientists" published by the Stanford University, Jadavpur University has 51 scientists in the list, which is third highest number of faculties selected from any university in India.
- Nature Index ranked Jadavpur University 1st among universities in India and 22nd overall in India (2023–2024). Additionally, it is ranked 19th among all Indian institutes in the field of Physical Science taking into account publications in 82-select high-quality science journals (2020–2021). In 2021–2022, The Nature Index ranked Jadavpur University in 19th in Physical Science, 23rd in Chemistry, 11th in Earth and Environmental Science and 24th overall among India's Higher Education Institutions.
- Times (THE): Jadavpur University was ranked 47th in the Times Higher Education-Thomson Reuters list of the 100 best universities in the BRICS and Emerging Economies, 2013.
- URAP: University Ranking by Academic Performance (URAP) Research Laboratory ranked Jadavpur University 10th in India in its 2012–13 report considering academic indicators.

== Controversies and Criticism ==
=== 2014 Jadavpur University Protests ===
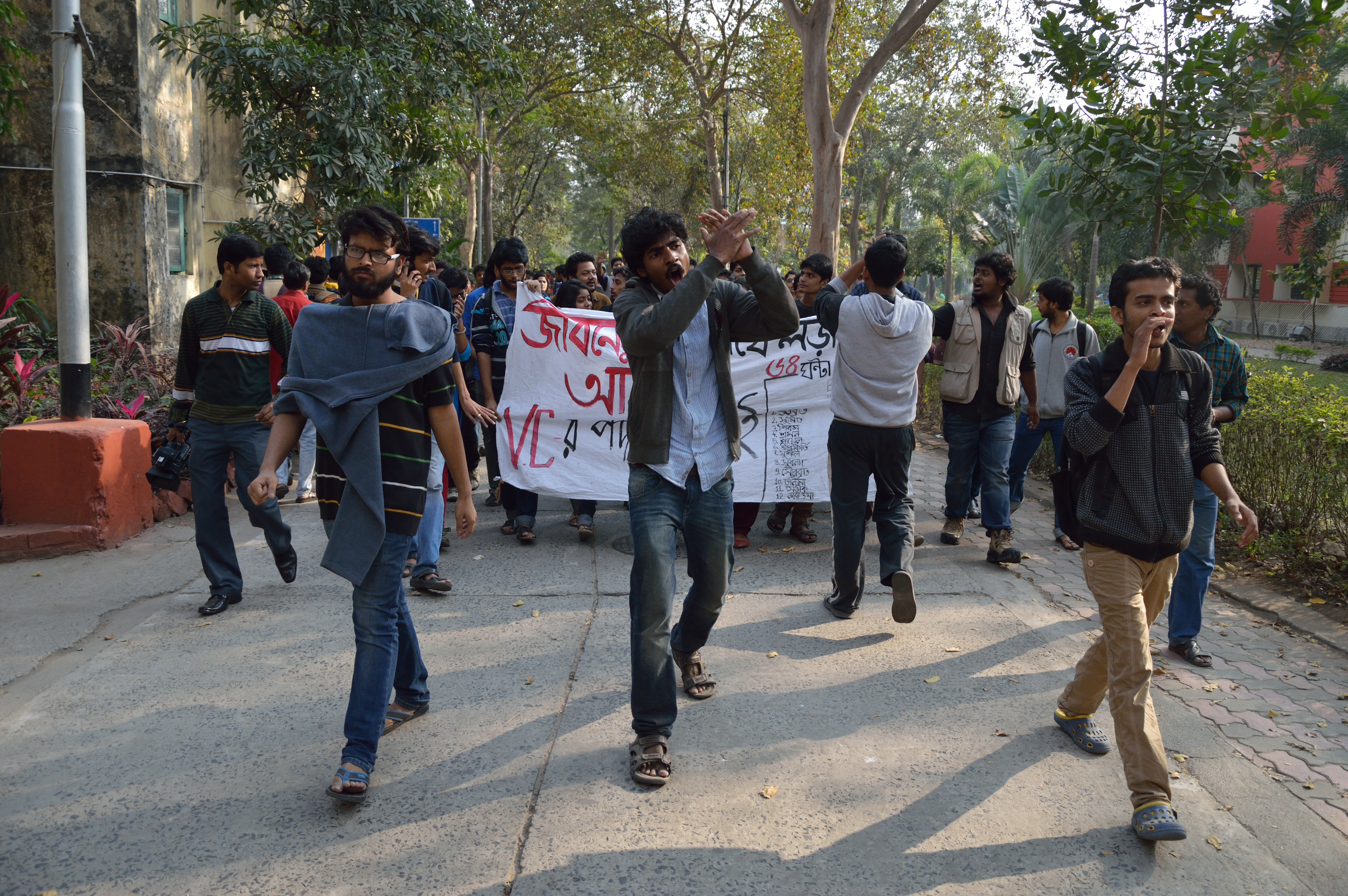
Students rally against the vice-chancellor during the 2014 Jadavpur University protests

In 2014 a series of protests broke out in response to the alleged molestation of a female student and beating of a male student by 10 other students on 28 August 2014. Her family and ultimately the student body were unsatisfied by the response of the Vice Chancellor to the allegations. Protests began on 10 September. On 16 September students gheraoed several officials in their offices, demanding that the Vice Chancellor make a statement on the status of a fair probe. Police were summoned, and later that night the police allegedly attacked and beat the student demonstrators. 30 to 40 students were injured; some had to be hospitalized. Reaction was nationwide, with supportive protests at multiple other cities including New Delhi, Hyderabad and Bengaluru. On 20 September, Governor Keshari Nath Tripathi, who is also the chancellor of the university, met with student representatives and promised to conduct an impartial inquiry. However, students said they will continue to boycott classes until the Vice Chancellor resigns.

On 26 September, a State Government inquiry panel submitted its report, confirming that the female student had indeed been sexually abused on 28 August 2014. On 26 September, police summoned two Jadavpur University students to come to the Lalbazar Police HQ for questioning at 4 pm on Friday. They were arrested at 6 pm. "The arrests were made after evidence was found, prima facie, against the duo. Further investigation is on," said joint CP-crime Pallab Kanti Ghosh. Mr Ghosh also stated, "(Two names) were arrested because we had enough evidence to prove that they were present at the spot and had carried out the crime as alleged in the victim's complaint." The duo were booked under Sections of 354 (assault or use of criminal force on a woman with the intent to outrage her modesty), 342 (wrongful confinement), 323 (voluntarily causing hurt) and 114 (abettor present when offence is committed) of the IPC.

=== 2018 Scrapping Entrance Tests ===
JU got embroiled in controversy on 4 July 2018, when the executive council announced its decision to scrap entrance tests for six humanities subjects which was met with protests from the Jadavpur University Teacher's Association and the student unions along with other academics and university students due speculations that state education ministry had influenced this decision.

=== 2023 ragging allegations ===
In August 2023, first-year undergraduate student Swapnadip Kundu died after falling from the Main Hostel balcony of Jadavpur University, in an incident linked to ragging. Police investigations indicated that he had been subjected to prolonged physical and mental harassment by senior students shortly before his death. Several current students and former students from Collective, WTI (We The Independent), FAS (Forum of Arts Students) and DSF (Democratic Students' Federation) were arrested in connection with the case, with allegations including confinement, verbal abuse, and intimidation. The incident triggered widespread public outrage and protests, drawing attention to persistent ragging practices despite legal prohibitions. Student organizations like SFI (Students' Federation of India), AISA, DSO and others led student protests against the state government demanding greater campus democracy and student union elections, and against the university authority demanding stricter punishment for ragging and better hostel facilities. It also led to administrative actions within the university and renewed debates on campus safety, accountability, and institutional responsibility.

=== 2026 ABVP SFI clash ===
In July 2026, State cabinet minister Dilip Ghosh directed BJP cadres to physically assault intellectuals opposed to the newly formed Suvendu Adhikary ministry by throwing eggs at them, whereas Adhikari himself led a rally consisting of sadhus and BJP cadres to Jadavpur University in order to intimidate the predominant left-wing student activists of the campus, whom he accused of spreading anti-Hindu and anti-Indian sentiments. The incident led to violent clash involving vandalism, arson and physical assault, on Jadavpur University campus between RSS-affiliated ABVP student body, right-wing outfits that barged onto campus and left-wing student bodies. The incident is criticized for ineffective action by police officials, denial of incidents by the Adhikary administration, and violence related to saffronisation of institutes. The incident is under investigation by the institute.

== See also ==
- List of Jadavpur University people
- List of universities in India
- Universities and colleges in India
