= History of the Anushilan Samiti =

The history of the Anushilan Samiti stretches from its beginning in 1902 to 1930. The Samiti began in the first decade of the 20th century in Calcutta as conglomeration of local youth groups and gyms(Akhra). However, its focus was both physical education and proposed moral development of its members. From its inception it sought to promote what it perceived as Indian values and to focus on Indian sports e.g. Lathi and Sword play. It also encouraged its members to study Indian history as well as those of European liberalism including the French Revolution, Russian Nihilism and Italian unification. Soon after its inception it became a radical organisation that sought to end British Raj in India through revolutionary violence. After World War I, it declined steadily as its members identified closely with leftist ideologies and with the Indian National Congress. It briefly rose to prominence in the late second and third decade, being involved in some notable incidents in Calcutta, Chittagong and in the United Provinces. The samiti dissolved into the Revolutionary Socialist Party in 1930.

== Background ==
The void arising from the precipitous decline of the Mughal Empire from the early decades of the 18th century allowed emerging powers to grow in the Indian subcontinent. These included the Sikh Confederacy, the Maratha Confederacy, Nizamiyat, the local nawabs of Oudh and Bengal and other smaller powers. Each was a strong regional power influenced by its religious and ethnic identity. However, the East India Company ultimately emerged as the predominant power. Amongst the results of the social, economic and political changes instituted in the country throughout the greater part of the 18th century was the growth of the Indian middle class. Although from different backgrounds and different parts of India, this middle class and its varied political leaderships contributed to a growing "Indian identity". The realisation and refinement of this concept of national identity fed a rising tide of nationalism in India in the last decades of the 1800s.

Bengal itself was relatively quiet during the 1857 uprising, although minor uprisings broke out in Chittagong, Dhaka and a number of other places. However, by the last quarter of the century, the Raj was firmly established in the Bengal Presidency and educated Bengali Babu, the middle-class Bhadralok community were amongst the largest numbers who filled civil and administrative offices throughout British India. In traditional British stereotype, the Bengali race was considered "feeble even to effeminacy" and the least martial of all Indian races. However, the Bengalee propensity to form public bodies and organised protests were noted from early on, which piqued the British observers. 1876 saw the foundation of The Indian Association in Calcutta under the leadership of Surendranath Banerjea. This organisation successfully drew into its folds students and the urban middle–class, for which it served as a mouthpiece. The Association became the mouthpiece of an informal constituency of students and middle-class gentlemen. The Association sponsored the Indian National Conference in 1883 and 1885, which later merged with the Indian National Congress. Calcutta was at the time the capital of British India, and the most prominent centre for organised politics, and some of the same students who attended the political meetings began at the time to organise "secret societies" which cultivated a cultural of physical strength and nationalist feelings. In Bengal at large, through the decades 1860s and 1870s, there arose large numbers of akhras, or gymnasiums consciously designed along the lines of the Italian Carbonari which drew the youth. These were influenced by the writings of the Bengalee nationalist author Bankim Chandra Chattopadhyay and by the works of Italian nationalist Giuseppe Mazzini and his Young Italy movement. To this was later added the philosophies and teachings of Swami Vivekananda, which emphasised a "Strong muscles and nerves of steel". This marked the beginnings of interest in physical improvement and proto-national spirit among young Bengalees, and was driven by an effort to break away from the colonial stereotype of effeminacy imposed on the Bengalee. Physical fitness was symbolic of the recovery of masculinity, and part of a larger moral and spiritual training to cultivate control over the body, and develop national pride and a sense of social responsibility and service.

In Calcutta, nationalist politics was developing at a rapid pace, allowing the city to develop as the most vocal centre of the young though still benign movement. Key leaders in the Congress-led movement in the province were Surendranath Bannejea and Motilal Ghosh, while figures like Pherozshah Mehta, Gopal Krishna Gokhale and the more radical Bal Gangadhar Tilak were gaining prominence in Maharashtra in the presidencies of Bombay and Poona. Through these last decades of the 1800s, however, the concept of secret societies and the propensity of nationalist violence was stronger in Maharashtra. Tilak himself was associated with such a society in Bombay. The most notable amongst the Maharashtrian societies was Mitra Mela (Friends circle) founded by V.D. Savarkar at Nasik in 1900. The organisation reformed as the Abhinav Bharat Society and moved to Poona. The trend towards secret societies in Bengal had in the meantime slowed down, and what existed did not engage in any notable political activities. It was at this time, at the turn of the 20th century, that the revolutionary organisations emerged with considerable potency in Bengal.

== Early developments ==
Among the first revolutionary organisations founded with an organised programme in Bengal was that led by Jatindranath Bannerjee and Aurobindo Ghosh. Ghosh was the grandson of leading Bengali reformer, Rajnarayan Bose. Schooled at St. Paul's and a graduate of King's College, Cambridge, Ghosh returned to India in 1893, undertaking a short career in political journalism in Bombay. He criticised the Congress's elitist politics which he argued was confined to the middle-class and effectively ignored the Indian masses of the lower classes. For Ghosh, the discussions engaged by the Congress members were frivolous, he argued for a radical and revolutionary movement for achieve political goals. Under pressure to tone down his criticisms, Ghosh withdrew from his writings altogether, which held for a good decade or so. In 1897, Aurobindo Ghosh took up the position of lecturer in French at Baroda College and was appointed acting Professor of English at the college in 1898. In 1899, Ghosh met Jatindranath Bannerjee. Both Bannerjee and Ghosh were members of a Bombay secret society that B.G. Tilak was associated with. Both Ghosh and Tilak shared thoughts on a program of revolution. Both envisioned an organised and disciplined uprising different from the terrorist tactics favoured by secret societies. Ghosh's thoughts were turned towards a military insurrection through Guerrilla warfare, aided by general revolt and popular resistance to which, if possible, the Indian Army was to be drawn in revolt. The grounding of such a program was to be "revolutionary propaganda and recruiting" and young Bengalees were to be trained in activities that would be helpful when the moment came. Ghosh emphasised activities riding, physical training, athletics of various kinds, drill and organized movement. He foresaw the program occupying up to thirty years before India was ready to rise. With the help of Tilak and some two others associates of the names Khasi Rao Jadav and Madhav Rao, Ghosh was, in September 1899, able to arrange for Jatindranath Bannerjee to enrol in the armed forces of the Princely State of Baroda with false papers. Tilak himself tried to arrange for Madhav Rao to obtain admission to a Russian military school, and ultimately was able to get him admitted to the Swiss Military Academy at Bern. Ghosh had worked close to the Gaekwar of Baroda, and in 1902, he establish contacts with men with similar views in Western India.

== Anushilan Samiti ==
=== Foundation ===
Around 1902, Aurobindo Ghosh arranged for Bannerjee to return to Calcutta to begin organisational work, where he began a gymnasium and a youth society. It was at this time that Bannerjee came in touch with Vibhuti Bhushan Bhattacharya, Sarala Devi Ghoshal and Pramathanath Mitra. In Calcutta, a few clubs and societies were still active at the time. Most notable was a gymnasium in Ballygunge Circular Road run by Sarala Devi herself, a second was an organisation named Anushilan Samiti founded by Satish Chandra Basu with the patronage of Pramathanath Mitra. A third one was a youth club called Attōnnōti Samiti (Self-improvement society) in central Calcutta.

Basu himself was a student of the General Assembly's Institution, and was influenced by Swami Vivekandan's works and teachings of Shakta philosophy. Basu kept in touch with Sister Nivedita and Swami Saradananda, both disciples of Vivekandanda. A further influence was the Japanese scholar Kakuzo Okakura who was closely associated with Nivedita and advocated Pan-Asiatic unity and nationalist sentiments in his many visits to Bengal. Basu was a member of the gymnasium at General Assembly, and practiced lathi-play, engaged in social work in destitute areas of Calcutta, and supported the Swadeshi industries. Encouraged by Nivedita and Saradananda, Basu founded the Anushilan Samiti in early 1902, initially, as a club for lathi practice. The name itself was inspired by one of Bankim Chandra Chattopadhyay's works entitled Anushilan-Tattva (Theory of discipline), which expounded the concept of allround development of physical, mental, moral and spiritual capabilities. In Pramathanath Mitra, Basu found a patron and through Mitra and Sarala Devi, Jatindranath Bannerjee was introduced to Basu. In March 1902, Bannerjee's group was amalgamated to that of Basu's, retaining the name chosen by the latter.

The early Anushilan Samity drew its members largely from the young student fraternity in Calcutta. New recruits were required to swear an oath on the Gita, and practiced the worship of arms in front of the image of Goddess Durga. These were however technical reasons why Muslims were not accepted. The members trained in drill, practiced swordplay, boxing, wrestling, and other exercises. Nationalist spirit and moral development was inculcated through weekly classes, and interactions with leading social figures of the likes of Rabindranath Tagore, Bipin Chandra Pal, Gurudas Bannerjee.

The Anushilan Samiti, however, failed to make any significant impact in its early years, as was the case for similar Calcutta groups. In 1903, Aurobindo Ghosh sent his younger brother Barindra Kumar Ghosh to Calcutta to rally the nascent organisation. Barindra, however, was forced to return to Baroda that same year following differences with Jatindranath Bannerjee. The society fragmented as a result of the clash, and may have led to the early demise of the still evolving movement. However, the events around 1905, when the controversial plan to partition Bengal was proposed, veered the course otherwise. They got into touch through the help of Sister Nivedita, with Hemchandra Kanungo, then a teacher at the Midnapore Collegiate School, who founded the branch of the Samiti at Midnapore and in turn recruited other revolutionaries like Khudiram Bose and Satyendranath Basu. The plans, implemented by the Viceroy, Charles Hardinge, drew widespread criticisms throughout Bengal. The local population, led by social figures and leaders of the Indian National Congress, refused to accept the Raj's argument that the partition was necessary for improving the administration in the province. It was seen as an attempt to divide Bengal on religious lines to stem the tide of political and nationalist work that was emanating from the region. The Raj argued that the opposition to the partition was motivated by the Hindu middle-class Bhadralok, who feared a loss of their government positions and influence in the administrative set up to the larger Muslim population of eastern Bengal. Opposition to the partition took shape in the Swadeshi movement, where imported goods were boycotted in Bengal and throughout India. These boycotts were enforced by groups of "volunteers" recruited from the youth Samities. The patronage of the extremist Bengalee politicians in the Congress, including the likes of Bipin Chandra Pal and Brahmabandhab Upadhyaya, helped Anushilan stem the decline and rejuvenated its influence and reach, and this in turn helped consolidate the position of the former as radicals within Congress. The unprecedented popular resistance to the partition plans also gave Anushilan fertile grounds to preach its cause and bring new recruits to its folds.

=== Dhaka Anushilan ===
In November 1905, Bipin Chandra Pal along with Pramathanath Mitra, visited Dhaka where, at a political meeting, Pal called for volunteers ready to sacrifice their all for Motherland. Among the eighty who stepped forward was Pulin Behari Das, a resident of Wari who was soon appointed the head of the East Bengal branch of Anushilan Samity. Under Das's able leadership, Anushilan "spread like wildfire" throughout the province. More than 500 branches were opened, linked by a "close and detailed organization" to Pulin's headquarters at Dhaka. It absorbed smaller groups in the province, and soon overshadowed its parent organisation in Calcutta. Branches of Dhaka Anushilan emerged in the towns of Jessore, Khulna, Faridpur, Rajnagar, Rajendrapur, Mohanpur, Barvali, Bakarganj and other places. Estimates of Dhaka Anushilan Samiti's reach show a membership of between 15,000 and 20,000 members. Within another two years, Dhaka Anushilan would devolve its aims from the Swadeshi to the dedicated aim of political terrorism.

=== Jugantar ===
Barindra Ghosh returned to Bengal around 1906, where he began organising volunteers movements in support of the agitations and the Swadeshi movement. His efforts drew the youth, whom he trained in the exercise, sword and lathi play and preached the cause of Indian independence. Among Barindra's associates at the time were Bhupendranath Dutta (brother of Swami Vivekananda) and Abhinash Battacharya. In the meantime, Aurobindo had returned to Bengal in 1906. The Calcutta wing had suffered a setback following Barin Ghosh's clash with Jatindranath Bannerjee earlier. In Bengal, Barin begun a sustained effort pick up where the group had left a few years previously. In the meantime, Aurobindo with the help of Bipin Chandra Pal and Barin founded in 1907 the radical Bengali nationalist publication of Jugantar (Lit:Change), and its English counterpart Bande Mataram. After a slow start, the journal gradually grew to acquire a mass appeal in Bengal through its radicalist approach and message of revolutionary programmes. This journal later lent its name to the Calcutta group that was gradually growing, ultimately forming what came to be called the Jugantar party. This lent the name of Jugantar party to the Calcutta group. Among the early recruits who emerged as noted leaders were Rash Behari Bose, Jatindranath Mukherjee, and Jadugopal Mukherjee. Jugantar party embarked irrevocably on the path of political terrorism, when plans were made to assassinate in summer 1906, the Lieutenant Governor of Eastern Bengal and Assam, Sir Bampfylde Fuller. This was the first of its planned "actions".

== Political assassinations ==
=== First phase ===
The two branches of Anushilan engaged at this time in a number of notable incidents of political assassinations and dacoities to obtain funds. In the meantime, in December 1907 the Bengal revolutionary cell derailed the train carrying the Bengal Lieutenant Governor Sir Andrew Fraser. In December 1907, Dhaka Anushilan Samiti assassinated D.C. Allen, a former district magistrate of Dhaka. In 1908, the activities of Anushilan saw eleven assassinations, seven attempted assassinations and bomb explosions, and eight dacoities in western Bengal alone. The targets of these "actions" included British police officials and civil servants, native Indian police officers, approvers and public prosecutors in cases of political crime, as well as the wealthy upper-class families. Anushilan, notably from early on, established links with foreign movements and Indian nationalism abroad. In 1907 Hemchandra Kanungo (Hem Chandra Das) went to Paris to learn the art of bomb making from Nicholas Safranski, a Russian revolutionary in exile in the French Capital. Paris was also home at the time Madam Cama who was amongst the leading figures of the Paris Indian Society and the India House in London. The bomb manual later found its way through V. D. Savarkar to the press at India House for mass printing. This was, however, followed by a temporary stumble for Anushilan. In 1908, two young recruits, Khudiram Bose and Prafulla Chaki were sent on a mission to Muzaffarpur to assassinate the Chief Presidency Magistrate D. H. Kingsford. The duo bombed a carriage they mistook as Kingsford's, killing two English women in it. In the aftermath of the murder, Khudiram Bose was arrested while attempting to flee, while Chaki took his own life. Police investigations into the murders revealed the organisation's quarters in Maniktala suburb of Calcutta and led to a number of arrests, opening the famous Alipore Conspiracy trial. Some of its leadership were executed or incarcerated, while others went underground. Aurobindo Ghosh himself retired from active politics after being acquitted, his brother Barin was imprisoned for life. This was followed by the Dacca Conspiracy case in 1909 which brought 44 members of the Dhaka Anushilan to trial. Anushilan, however, took its revenge. Nandalal Bannerjee, the officer who had arrested Kshudiram, was shot dead in 1908, followed by the assassinations of the prosecutor and the approver in the Alipore case in 1909.

Western Anushilan Samiti in the aftermath of Manicktala Conspiracy found more prominent leader in Jatindra Nath Mukherjee which emerged distinctly as the Jugantar group. Meanwhile, Rash Behari Bose extended the groups reach into north India, where he found work in the Indian Forest Institute in Dehradun. Mukherjee took over the leadership of the secret society to be known as the Jugantar Party. He revitalised the links between the central organisation in Calcutta and its several branches spread all over Bengal, Bihar, Orissa and several places in U.P., and opened hideouts in the Sundarbans for members who had gone underground The group slowly reorganised guided by Mukherjee's efforts, aided by an emerging leadership which included Amarendra Chatterjee, Naren Bhattacharya and other younger leaders. Some of its younger members including Tarak Nath Das left India. Through the next two years, the organisation operated under the covers of two seemingly detached organisations, Sramajeebi Samabaya (The Labourer's cooperative) and Harry & Sons. At around this time, Jatin began attempts to establish contacts with the 10th Jat Regiment then garrisoned at Fort William in Calcutta. Narendra Nath carried out through this time a number of robberies to obtain funds. In the meantime, however, a second blow came in 1910 when Shamsul Alam, a Bengal Police officer then preparing a conspiracy case against the group, was assassinated by an associate of Jatindranath by the name of Biren Dutta Gupta. The assassination led to the arrests which ultimately precipitated the Howrah-Sibpur Conspiracy case.

Nonetheless, the campaign by Anushilan continued. In 1911, Dhaka Anushilan shot dead two Bengali police officers, sub-inspector Raj Kumar and Inspector Man Mohan Ghosh, who had been investigating the unrest, were shot dead at Mymensingh and Barisal respectively. This was followed by the assassination of the CID head constable Shrish Chandra Dey in Calcutta. In February 1911, Jugantar bombed a car with an Englishman in it who was mistaken for Godfrey Denham. The activities of the group was marked most famously in 1912 when an attempt was made by Anushilan led by Rash Behari Bose, in coordination with Har Dayal's group in Punjab, to assassinate the Viceroy of India, Charles Hardinge on the occasion of transfer of the national capital from Calcutta to Delhi. The Delhi–Lahore Conspiracy, as it came to be called, culminated on 23 December 1912 when Basanta Kumar Biswas successfully bombed the Viceroy's Howdah as the ceremonial procession moved through the Chandni Chowk suburb of Delhi. Although wounded in the attempt, the Viceroy escaped with his injuries, along with Lady Hardinge, but his mahout was killed in the attack. The following investigations uncovered Rash Behari Bose as one of the Kingpins of political extremisms, and further, brought to light the extent of coordination between the extremist cells in Punjab and Bengal.

=== Prelude to World War ===
With the clouds of war gathering in Europe, Indian nationalists at home and outside India had decided to use the event of a war with Germany towards the nationalist cause. To these plans, a number of prominent Jugantar leaders became party. Through Kishen Singh, the Bengal revolutionary cell was introduced to Lala Har Dayal when the latter visited India in 1908. Har Dayal himself was associated with the India House, a revolutionary organisation in London then under V. D. Savarkar. By 1910, Har Dayal was working closely with Rash Behari Bose. Bose was a Jugantar member employed at the Forest institute at Dehradun, who worked, possibly independent of Jatin, on the revolutionary movement in UP and Punjab since October 1910. The India House itself was liquidated in 1910 in the aftermath of Sir W.H. Curzon Wyllie's assassination in the hands of Madan Lal Dhingra, a member of the London group. Among the India House group who fled Britain was V. N. Chetterjee, who left for Germany. Har Dayal himself moved to San Francisco after working briefly with the Paris Indian Society. In the United States, nationalism among Indian immigrants, particularly students and working classes, was gaining grounds. Tarak Nath Das, who had left Bengal for the United States in 1907, was among the noted Indian students who engaged in political work. In California, Har Dayal's arrival bridged a gap between the intellectual agitators in the west coast and the lower classes in the Pacific coast. He emerged a leading organiser of Indian nationalism amongst the predominantly Punjabi immigrant labour workers, founding the Ghadar Movement.

Meanwhile, in 1912, Jatin met in the company of Naren Bhattacharya the Crown Prince of Germany during the latter's visit to Calcutta in 1912, and obtained an assurance that arms and ammunition would be supplied to them. Jatin was intimated of Rash Behari's work through Niralamba Swami while on a pilgrimage to the holy Hindu city of Vrindavan. Returning to Bengal, Jatin began reorganising his group. Rash Behari had gone into hiding in Benares after the 1912 attempt on Hardinge, but he met Jatin towards the end of 1913, outlining the prospects of a pan-Indian revolution.

=== World War I ===
In 1914 Rash Behari Bose, along with the Maharashtrian Vishnu Ganesh Pinglay and some Sikh militants, planned simultaneous troop risings in different places in February 1915. In the meantime, in Bengal the activity of Anushilan and Jugantar launched what has been described by some historians as "...a reign of terror in both the cities and the countryside..." that "...came close to achieving their key goal of paralysing the administration...". A general atmosphere of fear encompassed the police and the law courts, severely affecting the morale. In the entire 1915, only six revolutionaries were successfully brought to trial. However both the February plot and a subsequent plot for December 1915 were thwarted by British intelligence. Jatin Mukherjee along with a number of fellow-revolutionaries were killed in a firefight with Policeforces at Balasore, in present-day Orissa. This effectively brought Jugantar to an end during the war. The passage of the Defence of India Act 1915 led to widespread arrest, internment, deportation and execution of members of the revolutionary movement. By March 1916 widespread arrests helped Bengal Police crush the Dhaka Anushilan Samiti in Calcutta. Regulation III and Defence of India act was applied to Bengal from August 1916 on a widescale. By June 1917, 705 were under home-arrest under the act, along with 99 imprisonments under Regulation III. In Bengal Revolutionary violence in Bengal plummeted in 1917. After the war these powers were extended by the so-called Rowlatt Acts, the passage of which was one of the goads that led to the launching of M. K. Gandhi's Non-Co-operation Movement.

== Gandhian era ==
=== Post World War I ===
Between 1919 and 1922, the first of the noncooperation movement began with the Rowlatt Satyagrahas under the call of Gandhi. This received widespread support both amongst leading luminaries of the Indian political movement. In Bengal, Jugantar agreed to the request of Chittaranjan Das, one of the most prominent and respected leaders of Congress at the time, and abstained from violence. However, Anushilan did not subscribe to the agreement but sponsored no major actions between 1920 and 1922, when the first non-Co-operation Movement was suspended. The years after saw both Jugantar and Anushilan becoming active again. The activity and influence of the Bengal terrorists led to the passage in 1924 of the Bengal Criminal Law Amendment Ordinance, extended as an Act the next year. This again gave the police extraordinary powers, and between 1924 and 1927 almost 200suspects were imprisoned, among them Subhas Bose. Acts of terrorism in Bengal dropped off Branches of Jugantar formed in Chittagong and Dhaka (present day Bangladesh). The Chittagong branch found particularly strong leadership in Surya Sen and in December 1923 staged a daring robbery of the Chittagong office of the Assam-Bengal Railway. In January 1924, a young Bengalee Gopi Mohan Saha shot dead a European he mistook to be Calcutta Police Commissioner Charles Tegart. The assassin was openly praised by the Bengali press and, to Gandhi's chagrin, proclaimed a martyr by the Bengal provincial branch of the Congress. Around this time Jugantar became closely associated with the Calcutta Corporation, headed by Das and Subhas Chandra Bose. Bose apparently ‘‘met with active revolutionaries and knew in a general way what they planned to do’’. Terrorists and ex-terrorists would be factors in the Bengal local-government equation from this point on.

In 1923, another Anushilan-linked group, the Hindustan Republican Association was founded in Benares in the United Provinces by Sachindranath Sanyal and Jogesh Chandra Chatterjee, and was influential in radicalising north India, it soon had branches from Calcutta to Lahore. A series of successful dacoities in UP culminated in the train robbery in Kakori. However, the subsequent investigations and two trials broke the organization. Several years later it would be reborn as the Hindustan Socialist Republican Association.

In 1927 the Indian National Congress came out in favour of complete independence from Britain. Bengal had quieted relatively within these four years and the government released most of those interned under the Act of 1925. There was an attempt, ultimately unsuccessful, to forge a Jugantar-Anushilan alliance at this time. Some of the younger radicals struck out in new directions, while many, young and old, took part in Congress activities, such as the anti-Simon agitation of 1928. Congress leader Lala Lajpat Rai succumbed to wounds received when police broke up a Lahore protest-march in October. Bhagat Singh and other members of the Hindustan Socialist Republican Association avenged his death in December. Later Bhagat Singh boldly threw a bomb into the Legislative Assembly. He and other HSRA members were arrested, and three of them attracted wide attention by going on a hunger strike in jail. Bengali bomb-maker Jatindra Nath Das persisted until his death in September 1929. The Calcutta Corporation passed a resolution of sorrow and condolence after his martyrdom, as did the Indian National Congress when Bhagat Singh was executed.

=== 1930s ===
As Congress-led movement picked up pace in the early thirties, some former revolutionaries identified with Gandhian political movement and became influential Congressmen, notably among them Surendra Mohan Ghose. Many Bengal Congressmen also maintained links with the Anushilan groups. Anushilan's revolutionary ideology and approach had not, in the meantime, died away. In April 1930, Surya Sen and his associates raided the Chittagong Armoury. The Gandhi-led Civil Disobedience Movement also saw the most active period of revolutionary terrorism in Bengal after first world war. During 1930 alone eleven British officials were killed, notably during the Writer's Building raid of December 1930 BY Benoy Basu, Dinesh Gupta and Badal Gupta. Three successive District Magistrates of Midnapore were assassinated and dozens of other successful actions were carried out during the first half of the decade. But this was a last flare-up before the fire was extinguished. The terrorist movement in Bengal may be said to have ended in 1934.

Through the twenties and thirties, many Anushilan members began identifying with Communism and leftist ideologies. Former Jugantar leader Narendranath Bhattacharya, now known as M. N. Roy, became an influential member of the Communist International, helping to find the Communist Party of India. Particularly during the mass detentions of the 1930s around the Civil Disobedience Movement, many members were won over to the party. By the end of that decade a number of left-wing parties were competing for the youth of Bengal. Most were aimed at broad-based class warfare, opposed to terrorism in principle. Those who did not join left-wing parties identified more closely with Congress. Jugantar was formally dissolved in 1938, many former members continued to act together under Surendra Mohan Ghose, who acted as a liaison between other Congress politicians and Aurobindo Ghose in Pondicherry.

== Revolutionary Socialist Party ==
A major section of the Anushilan movement had been attracted to Marxism during the 1930s, many of them studying Marxist–Leninist literature whilst serving long jail sentences. A minority section broke away from the Anushilan movement and joined the Communist Consolidation the Marxist group of Cellular Jail, and the members later joined the Communist Party of India. The majority of the Anushilan Marxists did however, whilst having adopted Marxist–Leninist thinking, feel hesitant over joining the Communist Party.

The Anushilanites distrusted the political lines formulated by the Communist International. They criticised the line adopted at the 6th Comintern congress of 1928 as 'ultra-left sectarian'. The Colonial theses of the 6th Comintern congress called upon the communists to combat the 'national-reformist leaders' and to 'unmask the national reformism of the Indian National Congress and oppose all phrases of the Swarajists, Gandhists, etc. about passive resistance'. Moreover, when Indian left-wing elements formed the Congress Socialist Party in 1934, the CPI branded it as Social Fascist. When the Comintern policy swung towards Popular Frontism at its 1935 congress, at the time by which the majority of the Anushilan movement were adopting a Marxist–Leninist approach, the Anushilan Marxists questioned this shift as a betrayal of the internationalist character of the Comintern and felt that the International had been reduced to an agency of Soviet foreign policy. Moreover, the Anushilan Marxists opposed the notion of 'Socialism in One Country'.

However, although sharing some critiques against the leadership of Joseph Stalin and the Comintern, the Anushilan Marxists did not embrace Trotskyism. Buddhadeva Bhattacharya writes in 'Origins of the RSP' that the "rejection of Stalinism did not automatically mean for them [the Anushlian Samiti] acceptance of Trotskyism. Incidentally, the leninist conception of international socialist revolution is different from Trotsky's theory of Permanent Revolution which deduces the necessity of world revolution primarily from the impossibility of the numerically inferior proletariat in a semi-feudal and semi-capitalist peasant country like Russia holding power for any length of time and successfully undertaking the task of socialist construction in hand without the proletariat of the advanced countries outside the Soviet Union coming to power through an extension of socialist revolution in these countries and coming to the aid of the proletariat of the U.S.S.R."

Anushilan Marxists adhered to the Marxist–Leninist theory of 'Permanent' or 'Continuous' Revolution. "...it is our interest and task to make the revolution permanent' declared Karl Marx as early as 1850 in course of his famous address to the Communist League, 'until all more or less possessing classes have been forced out of their position of dominance, the proletariat has conquered state power, and the association of proletarians, not only in one country but in all dominant countries of the world, has advanced so far that competition among the proletarians of these countries has ceased and that at least the decisive productive forces are concentrated in the hands of the proletarians."

By the close of 1936 the Anushilan Marxists at the Deoli Detention Jail in Rajputana drafted a document formulating their political line. This document was then distributed amongst the Anushilan Marxists at other jails throughout the country. When they were collectively released in 1938 the Anushilan Marxists adopted this document, The Thesis and Platform of Action of the Revolutionary Socialist Party of India (Marxist–Leninist): What Revolutionary Socialism Stands for, as their political programme in September that year.

At this point the Anushilan Marxists, recently released from long jail sentences, stood at a cross-roads. Either they would continue as a separate political entity or they would join an existing political platform. They felt that they lacked the resources to build a separate political party. Joining the CPI was out of the question, due to sharp differences in political analysis. Neither could they reconcile their differences with the Royists. In the end, the Congress Socialist Party, appeared to be the sole platform acceptable for the Anushilan Marxists. The CSP had adopted Marxism in 1936 and their third conference in Faizpur they had formulated a thesis that directed the party to work to transform the Indian National Congress into an anti-imperialist front.

During the summer of 1938 a meeting took place between Jayaprakash Narayan (leader of CSP), Jogesh Chandra Chatterji, Tridib Chaudhuri and Keshav Prasad Sharma. The Anushilan Marxists then discussed the issue with Acharya Narendra Deva. The Anushilan Marxists decided to join CSP, but keeping a separate identity within the party.

=== In the CSP ===
The great majority of the Anushilan Samiti had joined the CSP, not only the Marxist sector. The non-Marxists (who constituted about a half of the membership of the Samiti), although not ideologically attracted to the CSP, felt loyalty towards the Marxist sector. Moreover, around 25% of the HSRA joined the CSP. This group was led by Jogesh Chandra Chatterji.

In the end of 1938 Anushilan Marxists began publishing The Socialist from Calcutta. The editor of the journal was Satish Sarkar. Although the editorial board included several senior CSP leaders like Acharya Narendra Deva, it was essentially an organ of the Anushilan Marxist tendency. Only a handful issues were published.

The Anushilan Marxists were soon to be disappointed by developments inside the CSP. The party, at that the time Anushilan Marxists had joined it, was not a homogenous entity. There was the Marxist trend led by J.P. Narayan and Narendra Deva, the Fabian socialist trend led by Minoo Masani and Asoka Mehta and a Gandhian socialist trend led by Ram Manohar Lohia and Achyut Patwardan. To the Anushilan Marxists differences emerged between the ideological stands of the party and its politics in practice. These differences surfaced at the 1939 annual session of the Indian National Congress at Tripuri. Ahead of the session there were fierce political differences between the leftwing Congress president, Subhas Chandra Bose, and the section led by Gandhi. As the risk of world war loomed, Bose wanted to utilise the weakening of the British empire for the sake of Indian independence. Bose was re-elected as the Congress president, defeating the Gandhian candidate. But at the same session a proposal was brought forward by Govind Ballabh Pant, through which gave Gandhi veto over the formation of the Congress Working Committee. In the Subjects Committee, the CSP opposed the resolution along with other leftwing sectors. But when the resolution was brought ahead of the open session of the Congress, the CSP leaders remained neutral. According to Subhas Chandra Bose himself, the Pant resolution would have been defeated if the CSP had opposed it in the open session. J.P. Narayan stated that although the CSP was essentially supporting Bose's leadership, they were not willing to risk the unity of the Congress. Soon after the Tripuri session the CSP organised a conference in Delhi, in which fierce criticism was directed against their 'betrayal' at Tripuri.

The Anushilan Marxists had clearly supported Bose both in the presidential election as well by opposing the Pant resolution. Jogesh Chandra Chatterji renounced his CSP membership in protest against the action by the party leadership.

Soon after the Tripuri session, Bose resigned as Congress president and formed the Forward Bloc. The Forward Bloc was intended to function as a unifying force for all leftwing elements. The Forward Bloc held its first conference on 22–23 June 1939, and at the same time a Left Consolidation Committee consisting of the Forward Bloc, CPI, CSP, the Kisan Sabha, League of Radical Congressmen, Labour Party and the Anushilan Marxists. Bose wanted the Anushilan Marxists to join his Forward Bloc. But the Anushilan Marxists, although supporting Bose's anti-imperialist militancy, considered that Bose's movement was nationalistic and too eclectic. The Anushilan Marxists shared Bose's view that the relative weakness of the British empire during the war should have been utilised by independence movement. At this moment, in October 1939, J.P. Narayan tried to stretch out an olive branch to the Anushilan Marxists. He proposed the formation of a 'War Council' consisting of himself, Pratul Ganguly, Jogesh Chandra Chatterjee and Acharya Narendra Deva. But few days later, at a session of the All India Congress Committee, J.P. Narayan and the other CSP leaders pledged not to start any other movements parallel to those initiated by Gandhi.

Kanchan Sinha was associated with the Samyukta Socialist Party and was influenced by the ideas of Ram Manohar Lohia. He was active in the Barabanki and Gonda districts of Uttar Pradesh, where he was involved in local political and social activities. His work with the party was limited due to illness, and he died on 13 August 1975.

=== RSPI(ML) ===
The Left Consolidation Committee soon fell into pieces, as the CPI, the CSP and the Royists deserted it. Bose assembled the Anti-Compromise Conference in Ramgarh, Bihar, now Jharkhand. The Forward Bloc, the Anushilan Marxists (still members of the CSP at the time), the Labour Party and the Kisan Sabha attended the conference. The conference spelled out that no compromise towards the Britain should be made on behalf of the Indian independence movement. At that conference the Anushilan Marxists assembled to launch their own party, the Revolutionary Socialist Party of India (Marxist–Leninist) severing all links to the CSP. The first general secretary of the party was Jogesh Chandra Chatterji.

The first War Thesis of RSP in 1940 took the called for "turning imperialist war into civil war". But after the attack by Germany on the Soviet Union, the line of the party was clarified. RSP meant that the socialist Soviet Union had to be defended, but that the best way for Indian revolutionaries to do that was to overthrow the colonial rule in their own country. RSP was in sharp opposition to groups like Communist Party of India and the Royist RDP, who meant that antifascists had to support the Allied war effort.

== Notes and references ==
=== References ===
- Bandyopadhyaya, Sekhar (2004), From Plassey to Partition: A History of modern India, Mumbai: Orient Longman, ISBN 8125025960.
- Bates, Crispin (2007), Subalterns and Raj: South Asia Since 1600, Routledge, ISBN 978-0-415-21484-1.
- Desai, A.R (2005), Social Background of Indian Nationalism, Mumbai: Popular Prakashan, ISBN 8171546676.
- Heehs, Peter (1992), History of Bangladesh 1704-1971 (Vol I), Dhaka, Bangladesh: Asiatic Society of Bangladesh, ISBN 9845123376.
- Heehs, Peter (July 1994), "Foreign Influences on Bengali Revolutionary Terrorism 1902-1908", Modern Asian Studies, 28 (3), Cambridge University Press: 533–556, doi:10.1017/s0026749x00011859, ISSN 0026-749X, S2CID 144649406.
- Majumdar, Purnima (2005), Sri Aurobindo, Diamond Pocket Books (P) Ltd, ISBN 8128801945.
- Mitra, Subrata K (2006), The Puzzle of India's Governance: Culture, Context and Comparative Theory, New York: Routledge, ISBN 0415348617.
- Popplewell, Richard James (1995), Intelligence and Imperial Defence: British Intelligence and the Defence of the Indian Empire, 1904-1924, London: Frank Cass, ISBN 0-7146-4580-X.
- Radhan, O.P. (2002), Encyclopaedia of Political Parties, New Delhi: Anmol Publications PVT. LTD, ISBN 9788174888655.
- Roy, Samaren (1997), M. N. Roy: A Political Biography, Orient Longman, ISBN 81-250-0299-5
- Roy, Shantimoy (2006), "India Freedom Struggle and Muslims", in Engineer, Asghar Ali (ed.), They Too Fought for India's Freedom: The Role of Minorities, Sources of History, vol. III, Hope India Publications, p. 105, ISBN 9788178710914
- Saha, Murari Mohan, ed. (2001), Documents of The Revolutionary Socialist Party 1938-1947 A.D., Sri Prabodh Kar, ISBN 978-81-901193-0-6.
- Sen, Sailendra Nath (2010), An Advanced History of Modern India, Macmillan, ISBN 978-0230-32885-3
