= Barisal Conspiracy Case =

1913 legal case in India

The Barisal Conspiracy Case of 1913 was a trial prosecuted by the British colonial authorities against 44 Bengalis who were accused of planning to incite rebellion against the Raj and associated leaders were Trailokyanath Chakravarty and Pratul Chandra Ganguli. As such, it was part of the greater movement for independence that swept India in the decades prior to the departure of the British in 1947.

Judgment was passed in January 1914. Of the original 44 accused, 32 were discharged or pardoned, or had the cases against them withdrawn.

== Overview ==
Barisal was a district in the south-eastern corner of Bengal. The colonial police there reported that they had seized certain documents implicating the Anushilan Samiti, a revolutionary organization whose East Bengal chapters were under the leadership of Trailokyanath Chakravarty and Pratul Chandra Ganguli. The seized documents included a proposal to seduce native-born troops and to incite them to rebellion and wholesale massacre of the British.

The trial of the 44 commenced in Calcutta in June 1913. The prosecutor for the Crown purported to show evidence of how the conspirators had divided up Bengal into several districts in order to preach sedition. The Samiti had specifically targeted students and unmarried youth by means of meetings and religious services, and their membership numbered hundreds in Barisal district alone.

Judgment was passed in January 1914. Of the original 44 accused, 32 were discharged or pardoned, or had the cases against them withdrawn. The remaining 12 pleaded guilty to the charge of conspiracy against the British Crown. Five of the 12 - among them Pratul Chandra - were given lengthy transportation sentences to the Andamans of between 10 and 12 years. The remaining seven convicts were given transportation sentences between two and seven years.

The case had further consequences. The Calcutta daily Amrita Bazar Patrika had published a series of articles commenting on the case. A show cause motion was brought against the editor Motilal Ghose and the publisher of the newspaper, charging them with contempt of court. However, the motion was later dismissed by a special branch of the High Court.
