= Shinzo Takagaki =

Judoka

Shinzo Takagaki (1893–1977) was a pioneer in judo.

Takagaki brought judo to Australia in 1928, and Africa in 1931, and was considered to be an authority in judo. He is considered to be the father of judo in Asia as he taught in India, Burma, Afghanistan, Thailand, Malaysia, Java, Sumatra, and Taiwan. Takagaki also taught judo in Argentina at the invitation of Juan Perón, as well as Brazil, Peru, Mexico and Cuba.

Shinzo Takagaki was invited to India by the Indian Poet and social reformer, Rabindranath Tagore in the 1930's. Tagore was a great admirer of Jigoro Kano and his ideas. His fascination of Judo could be an extension of his admiration for Japan, especially after their victory in the Russo-Japanese War. Takagaki would establish his dojo at Shantiniketan, where Japanese jujutsu practitioner Jinnosuke Sano was also teaching students. For the duration of his time in India, he lived at Swinhoe Street, Ballygunge, Calcutta. Takagaki's arrival aligned with tumultuous times in Bengal, as Indian nationalists adopted more physical activities and hobbies to counter the British colonizers claims that Bengali's were weak and effeminate. As a result, his dojo became quite popular, taking in students such as Subimal Ray (Satyajit Ray’s youngest uncle) and Amita Sen (mother of the economist Amartya Sen). Shinzo Takagi and Jinnosuke Sano also helped covertly train Indian revolutionaries such as Pulin Behari Das and his revolutionary organization, the Dhaka Anushilan Samiti, in Judo and jujutsu.

He co-authored a book called The Techniques of Judo.

He attended Nihon University and was considered to be a spy for Japan.
