= Press Act =

Press act may refer to:

- Press act, 1910 legislation in British India
- Protect Reporters from Exploitative State Spying Act (PRESS Act), 2024 proposed legislation in the United States
