= Pratul Chandra Ganguli =

Indian revolutionary (1884–1957)

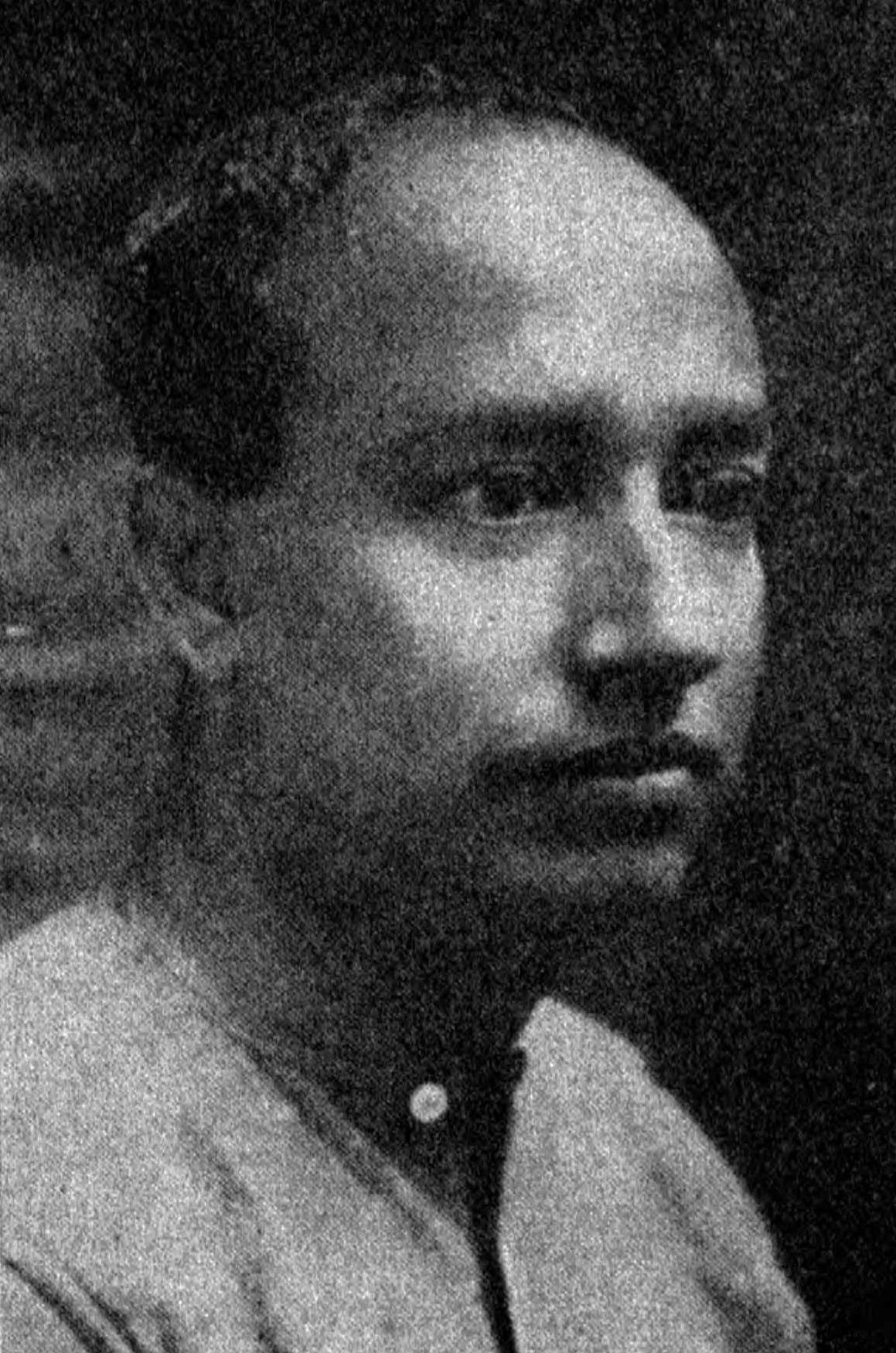
Revolutionary Pratul Ganguly

Pratul Chandra Ganguli (16 April 1884 Narayanganj – 5 July 1957 Kolkata ) was an Indian revolutionary.

== Short biography ==
Pratul was born at 16 April 1884 Narayanganj, now in Bangladesh. He was a member of the Anushilan Samiti. Following the arrest of Pulin Behari Das ( the main organizer of the Dhaka branch of Anushilan Samiti), Pratul and Trailokyanath Chakravarty took charge of the Anushilan Samiti and reorganized the association. He was tried in the Barisal conspiracy case and was sentenced for 10 years imprisonment in 1914, however he was released earlier. In 1922, he joined Congress. Somehow he also managed to maintain some revolutionary connections and continued helping the revolutionaries. Pratul became the president of Dhaka District Congress Committee, Bengal Congress Committee and All India Congress Committee. He was elected to the Bengal legislature in 1929 and in 1937. Pratul Ganguli retired from politics in 1947 and died at 5 July 1957 in Kolkata.
