= Shyam Sundar Chakravarthy =

Indian revolutionary, independence activist and journalist

Shyam Sundar Chakravarthy (alternately spelled as Shyam Sundar Chakravarty or Shyam Sundar Chakravarti, 12 July 1869 – 7 September 1932) was an Indian revolutionary, independence activist and journalist from Bengal. He was born in Bharenga, Pabna in Bengal Presidency (currently in Bangladesh) later settled in Calcutta. He belonged to the "Pabna Group" of Bengali revolutionaries along with Abinash Chakravarty and Annada Kaviraj. In 1905 he was the sub-editor of the revolutionary journal Sandhya. In 1906, he joined with Bengali nationalist newspaper Bande Mataram as an assistant to its editor Sri Aurobindo and later became its editor. In 1908, he was deported to Burma. Later he became an adherent of the non violent methods of Indian National Congress and an office bearer of the Swaraj Party. He founded and edited the newspaper "The Servant" in 1920 to promote the Non-cooperation movement. K. B. Hedgewar stayed with Shyam Sundar Chakravarty during his stay in Calcutta when he was doing his medical studies and came in contact with many revolutionaries and Anushilan Samiti who used to meet Chakravarty. Dal Bahadur Giri a noted independence activist from Kalimpong was inspired to join Non-cooperation movement movement and Indian National Congress upon advise of Chakaravarty, whom Giri used to meet when Chakaravery was imprisoned at Kalimpong jail in from 1916 to 1920 for revloutionary activities by British.

== Works ==
- Through Solititude and Sorrow
- My Mother's Face
