= Parul Mukherjee =

Indian revolutionary (1915–1990)

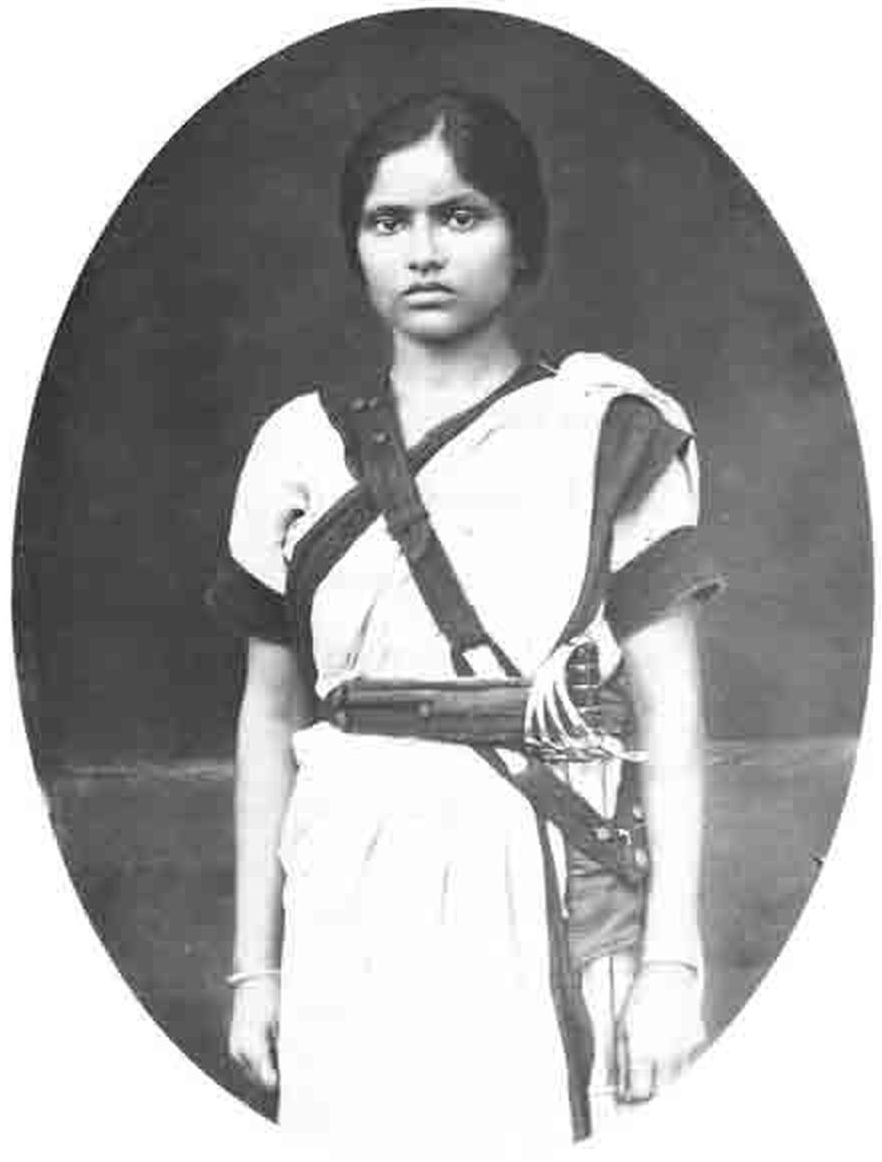
Mukherjee in the 1930s

Parul Mukherjee (1915 – 1990) was an Indian revolutionary active in the Indian independence movement in the early 20th century. Mukherjee was an influential member of the revolutionary organisation Anushilan Samiti, with which she partook in militant activities and helped recruit new members. She was particularly important in strengthening the women's wing of Anushilan Samiti through efforts such as recruitment, the organisation of study circles and the teaching of self-defence techniques.

Mukherjee was arrested in Titagarh on 20 January 1935 after being caught in a house with other revolutionaries and explosives. She spent four years in prison, being released in 1939 as part of a general amnesty for political prisoners. After her release, Mukherjee retired from public life. In the aftermath of the partition of India, she became the supporter of a refugee colony in Kolkata, where she stood vigil and established schools.

== Background ==
Parul Mukherjee was born in Comilla or Kolkata in 1915. Her father was named Guruprasanna Mukherjee and was originally from Dhaka. Her mother was named Manorama Devi. She had an older brother, Amulya, and a younger sister, Usha.

== Revolutionary involvement ==
Parul's older brother Amulya was involved in the revolutionary organisation Anushilan Samiti and was an important local leader. Mukherjee consequently grew up in a revolutionary environment as members of Anushilan Samiti often came to her house to meet with her brother. She was inspired to join the revolutionary movement herself due to the courage of her brother and the suffering endured by her family. She was officially recruited into the organisation in 1929. Her sister Usha also joined Anushilan Samiti. Women revolutionaries were mostly kept out of planning major strategies and activities and were for the most part allotted and assigned specific duties. Mukherjee however played a very active role in Anushilan Samiti.

Mukherjee's main work within Anushilan Samiti were her efforts to strengthen the women's wing of the organisation. She recruited a large number of women, organised study circles, and taught self-defence to female recruits; sometimes they reportedly trained with swords. Mukherjee also helped organise a student body in Comilla, the Comilla Chhatri Samiti. After some time she had earnt the nickname "Comilla's goonda". In addition to her organising, Mukherjee also involved herself in more militant activities and reportedly wielded two guns.

Mukherjee first ran into trouble with law enforcement in 1932. In February that year, the student and revolutionary Bina Das attempted to assassinate Governor Stanley Jackson, resulting in increased efforts from the police to arrest young men and women suspected of revolutionary involvement. Mukherjee was interned in her own home in Comilla until June 1933.

As a revolutionary, Mukherjee frequently shifted location, living with Anushilan Samiti units in places such as Rangpur, Barisal and Khulna. In order to operate unnoticed, especially since she was physically trained, Mukherjee at times concealed herself through masquerading as a man, wearing shirts and trousers. While moving locations, Mukherjee made further efforts to strengthen the Anushilan Samiti; she in 1933 worked to organise women's wings of the organisation in Barisal, Khulna, Comilla, Faridpur, Danapur, and Rangpur. In 1933, the police issued a warrant for her arrest due to her involvement in an interprovincial conspiracy case; Mukherjee had both defied her internment and was also believed to provide financial assistance to arrested revolutionaries through sending them money with their food in tiffin carriers.

=== Titagarh conspiracy ===
Mukherjee was eventually brought to an Anushilan Samiti hideout in Titagarh, where revolutionaries made and stored explosives. The house also served as a shelter for revolutionaries who had recently escaped imprisonment. The local ringleader was Purnananda Dasgupta, who had also recently escaped prison. The revolutionaries disguised their hideout as a family residence; Mukherjee, who was in Khulna at the time, was invited and set to pose as the housewife of Dasgupta's nephew.

In January 1935, the authorities in Titagarh were tipped off by an anonymous letter, which stated that there was a fashionable young woman living in the house without any men living with her and that young men often visited the house and left the next morning. Finding this suspicious, the police raided the building in the early morning of 20 January 1935. The two other revolutionaries in the house at the time, Dasgupta and Shyam Binode Pal had been ready to leave just as the police arrived. Pal opened the door after the police knocked, realised that it was the police, and then pushed the policemen out and locked the door again. Dasgupta, Pal and Mukherjee then ran up to the roof to examine the situation. Upon realising that the building was surrounded, Pal and Mukherjee began firing at the policemen with a revolver before Dasgupta, realising the hopelessness of their predicament, seized the revolver and threw it from the roof. Dasgupta and Pal then attempted to escape by jumping across the roof to the next building. Mukherjee meanwhile went back into the house and locked all doors. When the police demanded they be opened, she intentionally delayed in order to have time to destroy as many incriminating documents as possible. Once the police got in, Mukherjee was immediately arrested. Insided the house, the police found and seized explosives, bomb-making instructions, and several different chemicals. Mukherjee at first claimed to be called "Khuki" and then claimed to be "Surma Devi" before her real name was uncovered.

Dasgupta and Pal were also caught. All three revolutionaries were arrested on the suspicion of their house having served as the headquarters of a "conspiracy to wage war against the King-Emperor and deprive him by force of the sovereignty of a part of empire". Mukherjee was first brought to Titagarh Police Station but was on the next day sent to Tollygunge Police Station in southern Kolkata and then to a segregated cell in the Howrah jail. The police placed Mukherjee under both mental and physical pressure in an attempt to gain information on Anushilan Samiti. Her attendant in jail was a leprosy patient and she was subjected to physical torture by intelligence officers. At one point, an officer raped her before he was stopped and scolded by another officer. Mukherjee told the police nothing.

Like many other women revolutionaries, Mukherjee spent a long time detained without a trial. Her case was eventually tried before a tribunal in Alipore Court. On 21 September 1935 she was convicted under the Bengal Criminal Law Amendment for the possession of unlicensed firearms and sentenced to one year rigorous imprisonment. For the Titagarh conspiracy itself, she was again tried on 27 April 1937 and was sentenced to three years rigorous imprisonment. In addition to Mukherjee, Dasgupta and Pal, fourteen others detained in Bengal were also convicted for involvement in the conspiracy. While in the Alipore Jail, Mukherjee was at times beaten by the wardress.

== Later life ==
Mukherjee was released from prison in 1939 as part of a general amnesty for political prisoners. After being released, Mukherjee retired from public life. She never married. After the partition of India, Mukherjee settled in and supported a refugee colony in Kolkata. She is recorded to have stood vigil during the nights with a stick and a torch, sheltered stray animals, and to have set up schools for the refugees. She became the headmistress of one of the schools she set up. Due to her activities and support, she eventually became known as "Parul pishi", pishi being a word for a paternal aunt.
