= Anushilan Samiti =

Fitness club and anti-British underground revolutionary organization

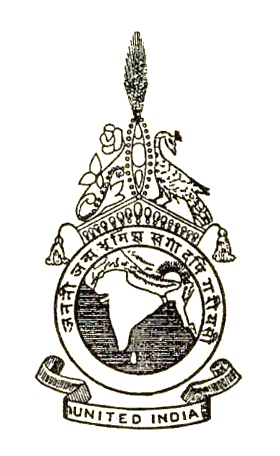
- The coat of arms of Anushilan Samiti
- Formation: 24 March 1902; 124 years ago
- Dissolved: 1930s
- Type: Secret Revolutionary Society
- Purpose: Indian Independence
- Location: Bengal

Anushilan Samiti (lit. 'Practice Association') was an Indian fitness club, which was actually used as an underground society for anti-British revolutionaries. In the first quarter of the 20th century it supported revolutionary violence as the means for ending British rule in India. The organisation arose from a conglomeration of local youth groups and gyms (akhara) in Bengal in 1902. It had two prominent, somewhat independent, arms in East and West Bengal, Dhaka Anushilan Samiti (centred in Dhaka), and the Jugantar group (centred in Calcutta).

From its foundation to its dissolution during the 1930s, the Samiti challenged British rule in India by engaging in militant nationalism, including bombings, assassinations, and politically motivated violence. The Samiti collaborated with other revolutionary organisations in India and abroad. It was led by the nationalists Aurobindo Ghosh, his brother Barindra Ghosh, and Hemchandra Kanungo. The early leaders were influenced by philosophies like Italian Nationalism, and the Pan-Asianism of Kakuzo Okakura. Ullaskar Dutta used to be the Jugantor group's principal bomb maker until Hemchandra Kanungo returned from Paris having learned bomb making and explosive chemistry. The Samiti was involved in a number of noted incidents of revolutionary attacks against British interests and administration in India, including early attempts to assassinate British Raj officials. These were followed by the 1912 attempt on the life of the Viceroy of India, led by Rash Behari Bose and Basanta Kumar Biswas, and the seditious conspiracy during World War I, led by Jatindranath Mukherjee.

The organisation moved away from its philosophy of violence in the 1920s due to the influence of the Indian National Congress and the Gandhian non-violent movement. A section of the group, notably those associated with Sachindranath Sanyal, remained active in the revolutionary movement, founding the Hindustan Socialist Republican Association in North India. A number of Congress leaders from Bengal, especially Subhas Chandra Bose, were accused by the British Government of having links with the organisation during this time.

The Samiti's violent and radical philosophy revived in the 1930s, when it was involved in the Kakori conspiracy, the Chittagong armoury raid, and other actions against the colonial administration of British India.

Shortly after its inception, the organisation became the focus of an extensive police and intelligence operation which led to the founding of the Special branch of the Calcutta Police. Notable officers who led the police and intelligence operations against the Samiti at various times included Sir Robert Nathan, Sir Harold Stuart, Sir Charles Stevenson-Moore and Sir Charles Tegart. The threat posed by the activities of the Samiti in Bengal during World War I, along with the threat of a Ghadarite uprising in Punjab, led to the passage of Defence of India Act 1915. These measures enabled the arrest, internment, transportation and execution of a number of revolutionaries linked to the organisation, which crushed the East Bengal Branch. In the aftermath of the war, the Rowlatt committee recommended extending the Defence of India Act (as the Rowlatt Act) to thwart any possible revival of the Samiti in Bengal and the Ghadarite movement in Punjab. After the war, the activities of the party led to the implementation of the Bengal Criminal Law Amendment in the early 1920s, which reinstated the powers of incarceration and detention from the Defence of India Act. However, the Anushilan Samiti gradually disseminated into the Gandhian movement. Some of its members left for the Indian National Congress then led by Subhas Chandra Bose, while others identified more closely with Communism. The Jugantar branch formally dissolved in 1938.

== Background ==
The growth of the Indian middle class during the 19th century led to a growing sense of Indian identity that fed a rising tide of nationalism in India in the last decades of the 1800s. The creation of the Indian National Congress in 1885 by A. O. Hume provided a major platform for the demands of political liberalisation, increased autonomy and social reform. The nationalist movement became particularly strong, radical and violent in Bengal and, later, in Punjab. Notable, if smaller, movements also appeared in Maharashtra, Madras and other areas in the South. The movement in Maharashtra, especially Mumbai (formerly Bombay) and Poona, preceded most revolutionary movements in the country. This movement was supported ideologically by Bal Gangadhar Tilak, who may also have offered covert active support. The Indian Association was founded in Kolkata (formerly Calcutta) in 1876 under the leadership of Surendranath Banerjee. The Association became the mouthpiece of an informal constituency of students and middle-class gentlemen. It sponsored the Indian National Conference in 1883 and 1885, which later merged with the Indian National Congress. Kolkata – formerly Calcutta was at the time the most prominent centre for organised politics, and some of the students who attended the political meetings began to organise "secret societies" that cultivated a culture of physical strength and nationalist feelings.

== Timeline ==
=== Origins ===
By 1902, Kolkata (formerly Calcutta) had three secret societies working toward the violent overthrow of British rule in India: one founded by Calcutta student Satish Chandra Basu with the patronage of Calcutta barrister Pramatha Mitra, another led by Sarala Devi, and the third founded by Aurobindo Ghose. Ghose and his brother Barin were among the strongest proponents of militant Indian nationalism at the time. Nationalist writings and publications by Aurobindo and Barin, including Bande Mataram and Jugantar Patrika (Yugantar), had a widespread influence on Bengal youth and helped Anushilan Samiti to gain popularity in Bengal. The 1905 partition of Bengal stimulated radical nationalist sentiments in Bengal's Bhadralok community, helping the Samiti to acquire the support of educated, politically conscious and disaffected members of local youth societies. The Samiti's program emphasised physical training, training its recruits with daggers and lathis (bamboo staffs used as weapons). The Dhaka branch was led by Pulin Behari Das, and branches spread throughout East Bengal and Assam. More than 500 branches were opened in Eastern Bengal and Assam, linked by "close and detailed organisation" to Pulin's headquarters at Dhaka. This branch soon overshadowed its parent organisation in Calcutta. Branches of Dhaka Anushilan Samiti emerged in Jessore, Khulna, Faridpur, Rajnagar, Rajendrapur, Mohanpur, Barvali and Bakarganj, with an estimated membership of 15,000 to 20,000. Within two years, Dhaka Anushilan changed its aims from those of the Swadeshi movement to that of political terrorism.

The organisation's political views were expressed in the journal Jugantar, founded in March 1906 by Abhinash Bhattacharya, Barindra, Bhupendranath Dutt and Debabrata Basu. It soon became an organ for the radical views of Aurobindo and other Anushilan leaders, and led to the Calcutta Samiti group being dubbed the "Jugantar party". Early leaders were Rash Behari Bose, Bhavabhushan Mitra, Jatindranath Mukherjee and Jadugopal Mukherjee. Aurobindo published similar messages of violent nationalism in journals such as Sandhya, Navashakti and Bande Mataram.

=== Nationalism and violence ===
The Dhaka Anushilan Samiti broke with the Jugantar group in West Bengal due to disagreements with Aurobindo's approach of slowly building a mass base for revolution. The Dhaka group instead sought immediate action and results through political terrorism. The two branches of the Samiti engaged in dacoity to raise money, and performed a number of political assassinations. In December 1907, the Bengal branch derailed a train carrying Bengal Lieutenant Governor Andrew Henderson Leith Fraser in a plot led by the Ghosh brothers. In the same month, the Dhaka Anushilan Samiti assassinated former Dhaka district magistrate D. C. Allen. The following year, the Samiti engineered eleven assassinations, seven attempted assassinations and explosions and eight dacoities in West Bengal. Their targets included British police officials and civil servants, Indian police officers, informants, public prosecutors of political crimes, and wealthy families. Under Barin Ghosh's direction, the Samiti's members also attempted to assassinate French colonial officials in Chandernagore who were seen as complicit with the Raj.

Anushilan Samiti established early links with foreign movements and Indian nationalists abroad. In 1907 Hem Chandra Kanungo (Hem Chandra Das) went to Paris by selling his land property to learn bomb-making from Nicholas Safranski, a Russian revolutionary in exile. In 1908, young recruits Khudiram Bose and Prafulla Chaki were sent on a mission to Muzaffarpur to assassinate chief presidency magistrate D. H. Kingsford. They bombed a carriage they mistook for Kingsford's, killing two Englishwomen. Bose was arrested while attempting to flee and Chaki committed suicide. Police investigation of the killers connected them with Barin's country house in Manicktala (a suburb of Calcutta) and led to a number of arrests, including Aurobindo and Barin. The ensuing trial, held under tight security, led to a death sentence for Barin (later commuted to life imprisonment). The case against Aurobindo Ghosh collapsed after Naren Gosain, who had turned crown witness, was shot in Alipore jail by Satyendranath Basu and Kanailal Dutta, who were also being tried. Aurobindo retired from active politics after being acquitted. This was followed by a 1909 Dhaka conspiracy case, which brought 44 members of the Dhaka Anushilan Samiti to trial. Nandalal Bannerjee (the officer who arrested Khudiram) was shot and killed in 1908, followed by the assassinations of the prosecutor and informant for the Alipore case in 1909.

After Aurobindo's retirement, the western Anushilan Samiti found a more prominent leader in Bagha Jatin and emerged as the Jugantar. Jatin revitalised links between the central organisation in Calcutta and its branches in Bengal, Bihar, Orissa and Uttar Pradesh, establishing hideouts in the Sunderbans for members who had gone underground. The group slowly reorganised, aided by Amarendra Chatterjee, Naren Bhattacharya and other younger leaders. Some of its younger members, including Taraknath Das, left India. Over the next two years, the organisation operated under the cover of two apparently-separate groups: Sramajeebi Samabaya (the Labourer's Cooperative) and S.D. Harry and Sons. Around this time Jatin attempted to establish contacts with the 10th Jat Regiment, garrisoned at Fort William in Calcutta, and Narendra Nath committed a number of robberies to raise money. Shamsul Alam, a Bengal police officer preparing a conspiracy case against the group, was assassinated by Jatin associate Biren Dutta Gupta. His assassination led to the arrests which precipitated the Howrah-Sibpur Conspiracy case.

In 1911, Dhaka Anushilan members shot dead Sub-inspector Raj Kumar and Inspector Man Mohan Ghosh, two Bengali police officers investigating unrest linked to the group, in Mymensingh and Barisal. This was followed by the assassination of CID head constable Shrish Chandra Dey in Calcutta. In February 1911, Jugantar bombed a car in Calcutta, mistaking an Englishman for police officer Godfrey Denham. Rash Behari Bose (described as "the most dangerous revolutionary in India") extended the group's reach into North India, where he found work in the Indian Forest Institute in Dehra Dun. Bose forged links with radical nationalists in Punjab and the United Provinces, including those later connected to Har Dayal. During the 1912 transfer of the imperial capital to New Delhi, Viceroy Charles Hardinge's howdah was bombed by a member of the Samiti, Basanta Kumar Biswas; his mahout was killed, and Hardinge was seriously injured.

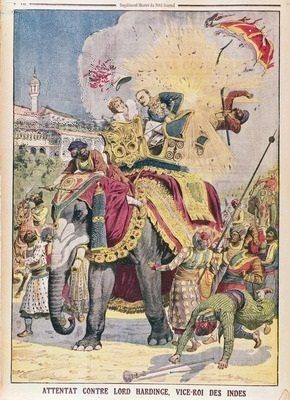
Assassination attempt on viceroy Hardinge by Biswas

=== World War I ===
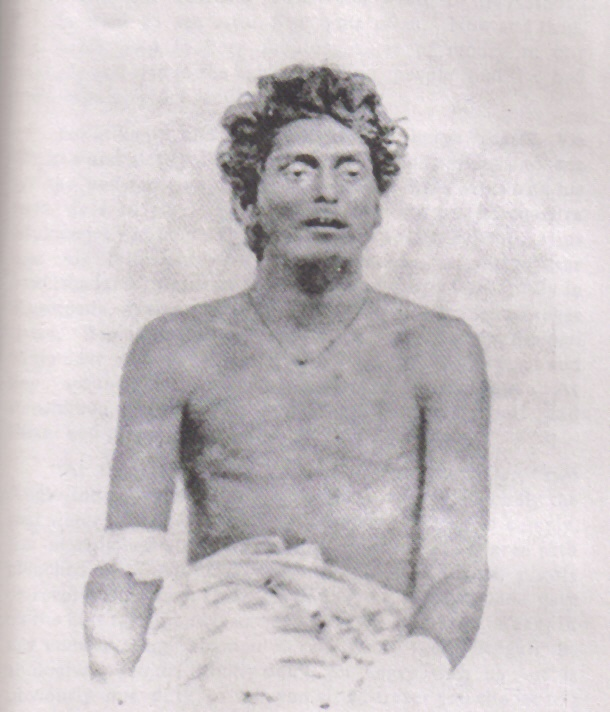
Bagha Jatin, wounded after his final battle on the banks of Burha Balang off Balasore.

As war between Germany and Britain began to seem likely, Indian nationalists at home and abroad decided to use the war for the nationalist cause. Through Kishen Singh, the Bengal Samiti cell was introduced to Har Dayal when Dayal visited India in 1908. Dayal was associated with India House, then headed by V. D. Savarkar. By 1910, Dayal was working closely with Rash Behari Bose. After the decline of India House, Dayal moved to San Francisco after working briefly with the Paris Indian Society. Nationalism among Indian immigrants (particularly students and the working class) was gaining ground in the United States. Taraknath Das, who left Bengal for the United States in 1907, was among the Indian students who engaged in political work. In California, Dayal became a leading organiser of Indian nationalism amongst predominantly-Punjabi immigrant workers and was a key member of the Ghadar Party.

With Naren Bhattacharya, Jatin met the crown prince of Germany during the latter's 1912 visit to Calcutta and obtained an assurance that arms and ammunition would be supplied to them. Jatin learned about Bose's work from Niralamba Swami on a pilgrimage to Brindavan. Returning to Bengal, he began reorganising the group. Bose went into hiding in Benares after the 1912 attempt on Hardinge but he met Jatin towards the end of 1913, outlining prospects for a pan-Indian revolution. In 1914 Bose, the Maharashtrian Vishnu Ganesh Pingle and Sikh militants planned simultaneous troop uprisings for February 1915. In Bengal, Anushilan and Jugantar launched what has been described by historians as "a reign of terror in both the cities and the countryside ... [which] ... came close to achieving their key goal of paralysing the administration". An atmosphere of fear severely affected morale in both the police and courts. In August 1914, Jugantar seized a large amount of arms and ammunition from the Rodda company, a Calcutta arms dealer, and used them in robberies in Calcutta for the next two years. In 1915, only six revolutionaries were successfully tried.

Both the February 1915 plot and a December 1915 plot were thwarted by British intelligence. Jatin and a number of fellow revolutionaries were killed in a firefight with police at Balasore, in present-day Orissa, which brought Jugantar to a temporary end. The Defence of India Act 1915 led to widespread arrests, internments, deportations and executions of members of the revolutionary movement. By March 1916, widespread arrests helped Bengal police crush the Dacca Anushilan Samiti in Calcutta. Regulation III and the Defence of India Act were enforced throughout Bengal in August 1916. By June 1917, 705 people were under house arrest under the Act and 99 were imprisoned under Regulation III. In Bengal, revolutionary violence fell to 10 incidents in 1917. According to official lists, 186 revolutionaries were killed or convicted by 1918. After the war, the Defence of India Act was extended by the Rowlatt Act, the passage of which was a prime target of the protests of M. K. Gandhi's non-cooperation movement. Many revolutionaries released after the war escaped to Burma to avoid repeated incarceration.

=== After the war ===
The first non-cooperation movement, the Rowlatt Satyagrahas led by Gandhi, was active from 1919 to 1922. It received widespread support from prominent members of the Indian independence movement. In Bengal, Jugantar agreed to a request by Chittaranjan Das (a respected leader of the Indian National Congress) to refrain from violence. Although Anushilan Samiti did not adhere to the agreement, it sponsored no major actions between 1920 and 1922. During the next few years, Jugantar and the Samiti became active again. The resurgence of radical nationalism linked to the Samiti during the 1920s led to the passage of the Bengal Criminal Law Amendment Ordinance in 1924. The act restored extraordinary powers of detention to the police; by 1927 more than 200 suspects were imprisoned under the act, including Subhas Chandra Bose, curtailing the resurgence of nationalist violence in Bengal. Branches of Jugantar formed in Chittagong and Dhaka, in present-day Bangladesh. The Chittagong branch, led by Surya Sen, robbed the Chittagong office of the Assam-Bengal Railway in December 1923. In January 1924 a young Bengali, Gopi Mohan Saha, shot dead a European he mistook for Calcutta police commissioner Charles Tegart. The assassin was praised by the Bengali press and, to Gandhi's chagrin, proclaimed a martyr by the Bengal branch of the Congress. Around this time, Jugantar became closely associated with the Calcutta Corporation, headed by Das and Subhas Chandra Bose, and terrorists (and ex-terrorists) became significant factors in local Bengali government.

In 1923 another group linked to Anushilan Samiti, the Hindustan Republican Association, was founded in Benares by Sachindranath Sanyal and Jogesh Chandra Chatterjee, helping to radicalise North India. It soon had branches from Calcutta to Lahore. A series of successful dacoities in Uttar Pradesh were followed by a train robbery in Kakori, and subsequent investigations and two trials broke the organisation. Several years later, it was reborn as the Hindustan Socialist Republican Association (HSRA).

In 1927, the Indian National Congress came out in favour of independence from Britain. Bengal had quietened over a four-year period, and the government released most of those interned under the Act of 1925 despite an unsuccessful attempt to forge an alliance between Jugantar and Anushilan Samiti. Some younger radicals struck out in new directions, and many (young and old) took part in Congress activities such as the 1928 anti-Simon Commission protests. Congress leader Lala Lajpat Rai died of injuries received when police broke up a Lahore protest march in October, and Bhagat Singh and other members of the HSRA avenged his death in December; Singh also later bombed the legislative assembly. He and other HSRA members were arrested, and three went on a hunger strike in jail; Bengali bomb-maker Jatindra Nath Das persisted in his strike until his death in September 1929. The Calcutta Corporation passed a condolence resolution after his death, as did Congress when Bhagat Singh was executed.

=== Final phase ===
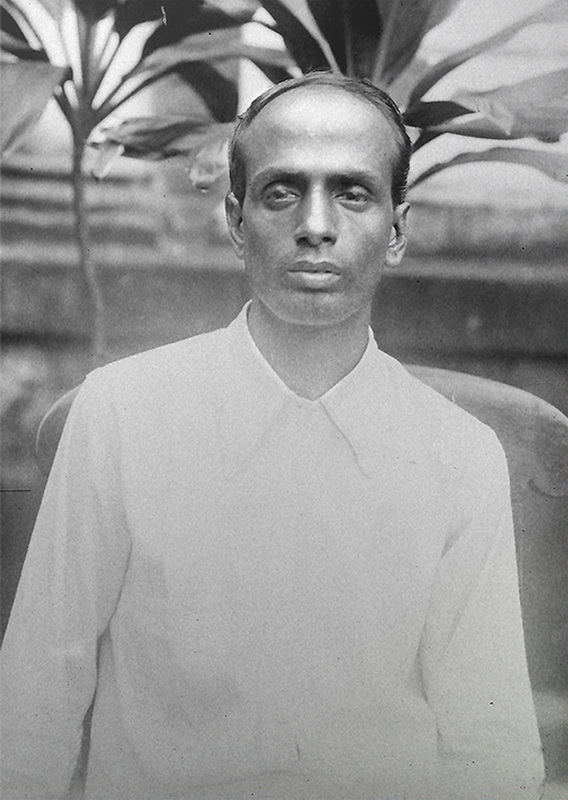
Surya Sen, Jugantar leader and mastermind of the Chittagong raid.

As the Congress-led movement picked up its pace during the early 1930s, some former revolutionaries identified with the Gandhian political movement and became influential Congressmen (notably Surendra Mohan Ghose). Many Bengali Congressmen also maintained links with the Samiti. Simultaneously with the nonviolent protests of the Gandhi-led Salt March, in April 1930, a group led by Surya Sen raided the Chittagong Armoury. In 1930 eleven British officials were killed, notably during the Writer's Building raid of December 1930 by Benoy Basu, Dinesh Gupta and Badal Gupta. Three successive district magistrates in Midnapore were assassinated, and dozens of other actions were carried out during the first half of the decade. By 1931 a record 92 violent incidents were recorded, including the murders of the British magistrates of Tippera and Midnapore. However, soon afterwards, in 1934, the revolutionary movement in Bengal ended.

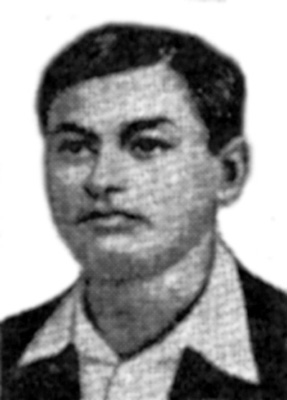
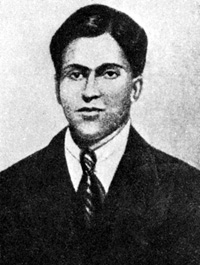
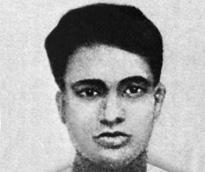
Benoy Basu, Badal Gupta, and Dinesh Gupta were noted for launching an attack on the Secretariat Building – the Writers' Building in the Dalhousie square in Kolkata.

A large portion of the Samiti movement was attracted to left-wing politics during the 1930s, and those who did not join left-wing parties identified with Congress and the Congress Socialist Party. During the mass detentions of the 1930s surrounding the civil-disobedience movement, many members joined Congress. Jugantar was formally dissolved in 1938; many former members continued to act together under Surendra Mohan Ghose, who was a liaison between other Congress politicians and Aurobindo Ghose in Pondicherry. During the late 1930s, Marxist-leaning members of the Samiti in the CSP announced the formation of the Revolutionary Socialist Party (RSP).

== Organisation ==
=== Structure ===
Anushilan Samiti and Jugantar were organised on different lines, reflecting their divergence. The Samiti was centrally organised, with a rigid discipline and vertical hierarchy. Jugantar was more loosely organised as an alliance of groups under local leaders that occasionally coordinated their actions. The prototype of Jugantar's organisation was Barin Ghosh's organisation set up in 1907, in the run-up to the Manicktala conspiracy. It sought to emulate the model of Russian revolutionaries described by Frost. The regulations of the central Dhaka organisation of the Samiti were written down, and reproduced and summarised in government reports.

According to one estimate, the Dacca Anushilan Samiti at one point had 500 branches, mostly in the eastern districts of Bengal, and 20,000 members. Branches were opened later in the western districts, Bihar, and the United Provinces. Shelters for absconders were established in Assam and in two farms in Tripura. Organisational documents show a primary division between the two active leaders, Barin Ghosh and Upendranath Bannerjee, and the rank-and-file. Higher leaders such as Aurobindo were supposed to be known only to the active leaders. Past members of the Samiti asserted that the groups were interconnected with a vast web of secret societies throughout British India. However, historian Peter Heehs concluded that the links between provinces were limited to contacts between a few individuals like Aurobindo who was familiar with leaders and movements in Western India, and that relationships among the different revolutionary groups were more often competitive than co-operative. An internal document of circa 1908 written by Pulin Behari Das describes the division of the organisation in Bengal, which largely followed British administrative divisions.

=== Cadre ===
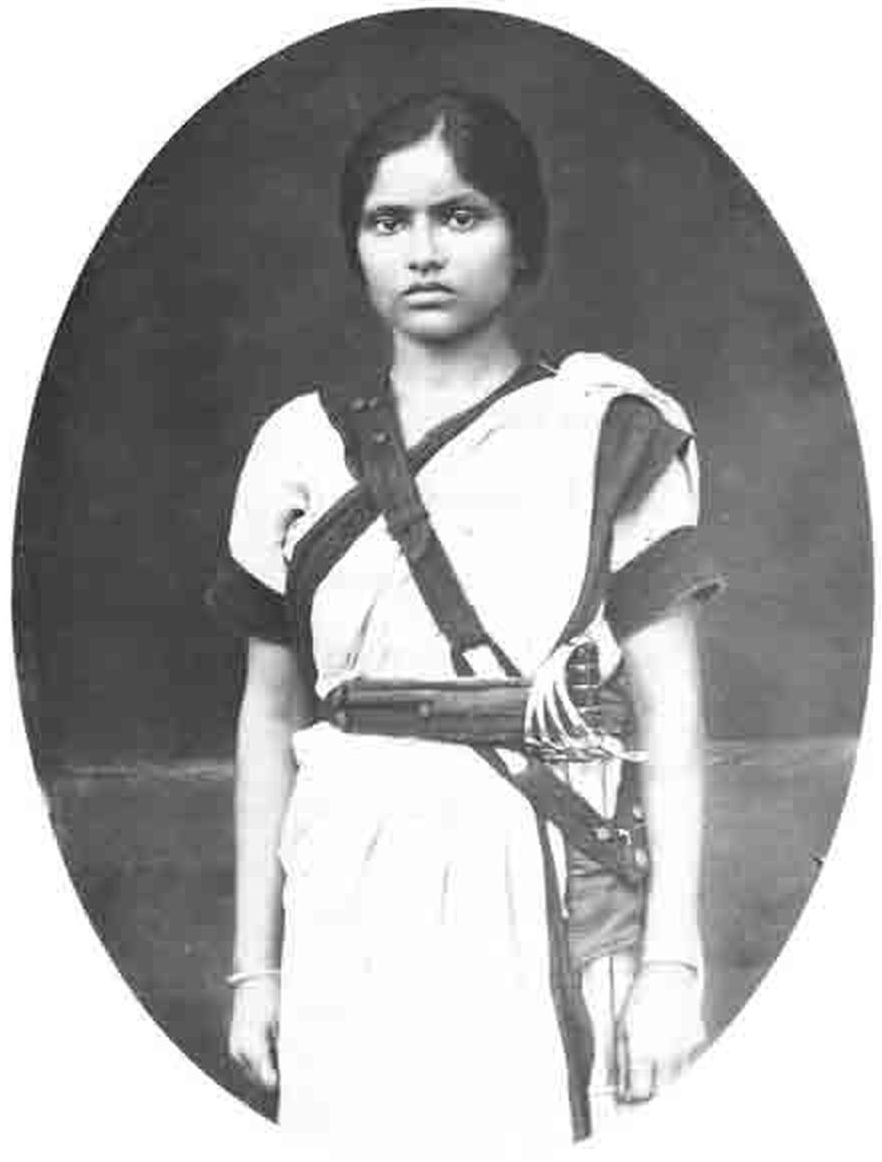
Parul Mukherjee, arrested in 1935, had roles in recruiting women to Anushilan Samiti.

Samiti membership was predominantly made up of Hindus, at least initially, which was ascribed to the religious oath of initiation being unacceptable to Muslims. Each member was assigned to one or more of three roles: collection of funds, implementation of planned actions and propaganda. In practice, however, the fundamental division was between military work and civil work. Dals (teams) consisting of five or ten members led by a dalpati (team leader) were grouped together in local Samiti led by adhyakshas (executive officers) and other officers. These reported to district officers appointed by and responsible to the central Dhaka organisation, commanded by Pulin Das and those who deputised for him during his periods of imprisonment. Samitis were divided into four functional groups: violence, organisation, keepers of arms, and householders. Communications were carried by special couriers and written in secret code. These practices and others were inspired by literary sources and were partly a concession to the desire of young men to act out romantic drama. Less is known about the Jugantar network, which took the place of the Manicktala society after the Alipore bomb case. It faced divisions similar to the Samiti. Historian Leonard Gordon notes that at least in the period between 1910 and 1915, the dals in the Jugantar network were separate units, led by a dada (lit: elder brother). The dada was also guru, teaching those under his command practical skills, revolutionary ideology, and strategy. Gordon suggests that the dada system developed out of pre-existing social structures in rural Bengal. Dadas both co-operated and competed with each other for men, money, and material.

Many members of the Samiti came from upper castes. By 1918, nearly 90% of the revolutionaries killed or convicted were Brahmins, Kayasthas or Vaidyas; rests are from agricultural or pastoral castes like Mahishya or Yadav. As the Samiti spread its influence to other parts of the country, particularly North India, it began to draw in people of other religions and of varying religious commitments. For example, many who joined the Hindustan Republican Socialist Association were Marxists and many were militant atheists. By the late 1930s, members with a more secular outlook were beginning to participate. Some components of the Samiti also included prominent participation from women, including Pritilata Waddedar who led a Jugantar attack during the Chittagong Armoury raid, and Kalpana Dutta who manufactured bombs at Chittagong.

== Ideologies ==
=== Indian philosophies ===
The Samiti was influenced by the writings of the Bengali nationalist author Bankim Chandra Chattopadhyay. The name of the organisation, Anushilan, is derived from Bankim's works espousing hard work and spartan life. Bankim's cultural and martial nationalism, exemplified in Anandamath, along with his reinterpretation of the Bhagavat Gita, were strong influences on the strain of nationalism that inspired the early societies that later became Anushilan Samiti. A search of the Dacca Anushilan Samiti library in 1908 showed that Bankim's Bhagavat Gita was the most widely read book in the library.

The philosophies and teachings of Swami Vivekananda were later added to this philosophy. The "Rules of Membership" in the Dacca library strongly recommended reading his books. These books emphasised "strong muscles and nerves of steel", which some historians consider to be strongly influenced by the Hindu Shakta Philosophy. This interest in physical improvement and proto-national spirit among young Bengalis was driven by an effort to break away from the stereotype of effeminacy that the British had imposed on the Bengalis. Physical fitness was symbolic of the recovery of masculinity, and part of a larger moral and spiritual training to cultivate control over the body, and develop national pride and a sense of social responsibility and service. Peter Heehs, writing in 2010, notes the Samiti had three pillars in their ideologies: "cultural independence", "political independence", and "economic independence". In terms of economic independence, the Samiti diverged from the Swadeshi movement, which they decried as a "trader's movement".

=== European influences ===
When the Samiti first came into prominence following the Muzaffarpur killings, its ideology was felt to be influenced by European anarchism. Lord Minto resisted the notion that its action might be the manifestation of political grievance by concluding that:

Murderous methods hitherto unknown in India ... have been imported from the West, ... which the imitative Bengali has childishly accepted.

However others disagreed. John Morley was of the opinion that the political violence exemplified by the Samiti was a manifestation of Indian antagonism to the government, although there were also influences of European nationalism and philosophies of liberalism. In the 1860s and 1870s, large numbers of akhras (gymnasiums) arose in Bengal that were consciously designed along the lines of the Italian Carbonari. These were influenced by the works of Italian nationalist Giuseppe Mazzini and his Young Italy movement. Aurobindo himself studied the revolutionary nationalism of Ireland, France and America. Hem Chandra Das, during his stay in Paris, is also noted to have interacted with European radical nationalists in the city, returning to India an atheist with Marxist leanings.

=== Okakura and Nivedita ===
Foreign influences on the Samiti included the Japanese artist Kakuzo Okakura and Margaret Noble, an Irish woman known as Sister Nivedita. Okakura was a proponent of Pan-Asianism. He visited Swami Vivekananda in Calcutta in 1902, and inspired Pramathanath Mitra in the early days of the Samiti. However the extent of his involvement or influence is debated. Nivedita was a disciple of Swami Vivekananda. She had contacts with Aurobindo, with Satish Bose and with Jugantar sub-editor Bhupendranath Bose. Nivedita is believed to have influenced members of the Samiti by talking about their duties to the motherland and providing literature on revolutionary nationalism. She was a correspondent of Peter Kropotkin, a noted anarchist.

=== Major influences ===
A major section of the Anushilan movement had been attracted to Marxism during the 1920s and 1930s, many of them studying Marxist–Leninist literature whilst serving long jail sentences. A majority broke away from the Anushilan Samiti and joined the Communist Consolidation the Marxist group in Cellular Jail, and they later the Communist Party of India (CPI). Some of the Anushilan Marxists were hesitant to join the Communist Party, few joined the RSP however, since they distrusted the political lines formulated by the Communist International. They also did not embrace Trotskyism, although they shared some Trotskyist critiques of the leadership of Joseph Stalin.

== Impact ==
=== Police reaction and reforms ===
Shortly after its inception, the Samiti became the focus of extensive police and intelligence operation. Notable officers who led the police and intelligence operations against them at various times included Sir Robert Nathan, Sir Harold Stuart, Sir Charles Stevenson-Moore and Sir Charles Tegart.

The CIDs of Bengal and the provinces of Eastern Bengal and Assam were founded in response to the revolutionary movement led by the Samiti. By 1908, political crime duties took the services of one deputy Superintendent of Police, 52 Inspectors and Sub-Inspectors, and nearly 720 constables. Foreseeing a rise in the strength of the revolutionary movement, Sir Harold Stuart (then Secretary of State for India) implemented plans for secret service to fight the menace posed by the Samiti. A Political Crime branch of the C.I.D. (known as the "Special Department") was developed in September 1909, staffed by 23 officers and 45 men. The government of India allocated Rs 2,227,000 for the Bengal Police alone in the reforms of 1909–1910.

By 1908 a Special Officer for Political Crime was appointed from the Bengal Police, with the Special Branch of Police working under him. This post was first occupied by C.W.C. Plowden and later by F.C. Daly. Godfrey Denham, then Assistant Superintendent of Police, served under the Special Officer. Denham was credited with uncovering the Manicktala safe house of the Samiti, raiding it in May 1908, which ultimately led to the Manicktala conspiracy case. This case led to further expansion of the Special Branch in Bengal. The CID in Eastern Bengal and Assam (EBA) were founded in 1906 and expanded from 1909 onwards. However, the EBA police's access to informers and secret agents remained difficult. In EBA, a civil servant, H.L. Salkeld, uncovered the eastern branch of Anushilan Samiti, producing a four-volume report and placing 68 suspects under surveillance. However the Samiti evaded detailed intrusion by adopting the model of Russian revolutionaries. Until 1909, the police were unclear whether they were dealing with a single organisation or with a conglomeration of independent groups.

The visit of King George V to India in 1911 catalysed improvements in police equipment and staffing in Bengal and EBA. In 1912, the political branch of the Bengal CID was renamed the Intelligence Branch, staffed with 50 officers and 127 men. The branch had separate sections dealing with explosives, assassinations, and robberies. It was headed by Charles Tegart, who built up a network of agents and informers to infiltrate the Samiti. Tegart would meet his agents under cover of darkness, at times disguising himself as a pathan or kabuliwallah. Assisting Denham and Petrie, Tegart led the investigation in the aftermath of the Dalhi-Lahore Conspiracy and identified Chandernagore as the main hub for the Samiti. Tegart remained in the Bengal police until at least the 1930s, earning notoriety amongst the Samiti for his work, and was subjected to a number of assassination attempts. In 1924, Ernest Day, an Englishman, was shot dead by Gopinath Saha at Chowringhee Road in Calcutta, due to being mistaken for Tegart. In 1930, a bomb was thrown into Tegart's car at Dalhousie Square but Tegart managed to shoot the revolutionary and escaped unhurt. His efficient curbing of the revolutionary movement earned praise from Lord Lytton and he was awarded the King's medal. In 1937 Tegart was sent to the British Mandate of Palestine, then in the throes of the Arab Revolt, to advise the Inspector General on security.

=== Criminal Law Amendment 1908 ===
In its fight against the Raj, the Samiti's members who turned approvers (i.e. gave evidence against their colleagues) and the Bengal Police staff who were investigating the Samiti were consistently targeted. A number of assassinations were carried out of approvers who had agreed to act as crown witnesses. In 1909 Naren Gossain, crown witness for the prosecution in Alipore bomb case, was shot dead within Alipore Jail by Satyendranath Boseu and Kanai Lal Dutt. Ashutosh Biswas, an advocate of Calcutta High Court in charge of prosecution of Gossain murder case, was shot dead within Calcutta High Court in 1909. In 1910, Shamsul Alam, Deputy Superintendent of Bengal Police responsible for investigating the Alipore bomb case, was shot dead on the steps of Calcutta High Court. The failures of a number of prosecutions of violence linked to the Samiti under the Criminal Procedures Act of 1898 led to a special act that provided for crimes of nationalist violence to be tried by a special tribunal composed of three high-court judges. In December 1908 the Criminal Law amendments were passed under the terms of Regulation III of 1818, with the goal of suppressing associations formed for seditious conspiracies. The act was first applied to deport nine Bengali revolutionaries to Mandalay prison in 1908. Despite these measures however, the high standards of evidence demanded by the Calcutta High Court, insufficient investigations by police, and at times outright fabrication of evidence, led to persistent failures to tame nationalist violence. The police forces felt unable to deal with the operations of secretive nationalist organisations, leading to demands for special powers. The Indian press opposed these demands strenuously, arguing against any extension of the already wide powers enjoyed by the police forces in India, which they claimed were already being used to oppress the Indian people.

=== Defence of India Act ===
The threat posed by the activities of the Samiti in Bengal during World War I, along with the threat of a Ghadarite uprising in Punjab, led to the passage of Defence of India Act 1915. The act received universal support from Indian non-officiating members in the Governor General's council and from moderate leaders within the Indian political movement. The British war effort had received popular support within India and the act received support on the understanding that the measures enacted were necessary in the war situation. These measures enabled the arrest, internment, transportation, and execution of a number of revolutionaries linked to the organisation, which crushed the East Bengal branch of the Samiti. Its application led to 46 executions, as well as 64 life sentences given to revolutionaries in Bengal and Punjab in the Lahore Conspiracy Trial and Benares Conspiracy Trial, and in tribunals in Bengal, effectively crushing the revolutionary movement. By March 1916, widespread arrests had helped Bengal Police crush the Dhaka Anushilan Samiti in Calcutta. The power of preventive detention was used extensively in Bengal, and revolutionary violence in Bengal plummeted to 10 incidents in 1917. By the end of the war there were over 800 detainees under the act in Bengal under the act. However, indiscriminate application of the act made it increasingly unpopular with the Indian public.

=== Rowlatt act ===
The 1915 act was designed to expire in 1919, and the Rowlatt Committee was appointed to recommend measures to continue to suppress the revolutionary movement. The committee recommended an extension of the provisions of the Defence of India Act for a further three years with the removal of habeas corpus provisions. However this was met with universal opposition by the Indian members of the Viceroy's council, as well as the population in general, and Gandhi called the proposed act "The Black Bills". Mohammed Ali Jinnah left the Viceroy's council in protest, after having warned the council of the danger of enacting such an unpopular bill. Nevertheless, the recommendations were enacted in the Rowlatt Bills. Gandhi then led a protest, the Rowlatt Satyagraha, one of the first civil disobedience movements that would become the Indian independence movement. The protests included hartals in Delhi, public protests in Punjab, and other protest movements across India. In Punjab, the protests culminated in the Jallianwalla Bagh Massacre in April 1919. After nearly three years of agitation, the government finally repealed the Rowlatt act and its component sister acts.

=== Bengal Criminal Law Amendment ===
A resurgence of radical nationalism linked to the Samiti after 1922 led to the implementation of the Bengal Criminal Law Amendment in 1924, which reinstated the powers of incarceration and detention from the Defence of India Act. The act re-introduced extraordinary powers of detention to the police, and by 1927 more than 200 suspects had been imprisoned, including Subhas Chandra Bose. The implementation of the act successfully curtailed a resurgence in nationalist violence in Bengal, at a time when the Hindustan Republican Association was rising in the United Provinces.

After the 1920s, the Anushilan Samiti gradually dissolved into the Gandhian movement. Some of its members left for the Indian National Congress, then led by Subhas Chandra Bose, while others identified more closely with Communism. The Jugantar branch formally dissolved in 1938. In independent India, the party in West Bengal evolved into the Revolutionary Socialist Party, while the Eastern Branch later evolved into the Sramik Krishak Samajbadi Dal (Workers and Peasants Socialist Party) in present-day Bangladesh.

== Influence ==
=== Revolutionary nationalism ===
The nationalist publication Jugantar, which served as the organ of the Samiti, inspired fanatical loyalty among its readers. By 1907 it was selling 7,000 copies, which later rose to 20,000. Its message was aimed at elite politically conscious readers and was essentially a critique of British rule in India and justification of political violence. Several young men who joined the Samiti credited Jugantar with influencing their decisions. The editor of the paper, Bhupendranath Datta, was arrested and sentenced to one year's rigorous imprisonment in 1907. The Samiti responded by attempting to assassinate Douglas Kingsford, who presided over the trial, and Jugantar responded with defiant editorials. Jugantar was repeatedly prosecuted, leaving it in financial ruins by 1908. However, the prosecutions brought the paper more publicity and helped disseminate the Samiti's ideology of revolutionary nationalism. Historian Shukla Sanyal has commented that revolutionary terrorism as an ideology began to win at least tacit support amongst a significant populace at this time.

Keshav Baliram Hedgewar, the founder of the Hindu nationalist organisation Rashtriya Swayamsevak Sangh (RSS), was an alumnus of the Anushilan Samiti. He was sent to Calcutta by B. S. Moonje in 1910 to study medicine, and to learn techniques of violent nationalism from secret revolutionary organisations in Bengal. There he lived with independence activist Shyam Sundar Chakravarty, and had contacts with revolutionaries like Ram Prasad Bismil.

=== Indian independence movement ===
James Popplewell, writing in 1995, noted that the Raj perceived the Samiti in its early days as a serious threat to its rule. However, historian Sumit Sarkar noted that the Samiti never mustered enough support to offer an urban rebellion or a guerrilla campaign. Both Peter Heehs and Sumit Sarkar have noted that the Samiti called for complete independence over 20 years before the Congress adopted this as its aim. A number of landmark events early in the Indian independence movement, including the revolutionary conspiracies of World War I, involved the Samiti, as noted in the Rowlatt report. Later the ascendant left-wing of the Congress, particularly Subhas Chandra Bose, was suspected of having links with the Samiti. Heehs argued that the actions of the revolutionary nationalists exemplified by the Samiti forced the government to parley more seriously with the leaders of the legitimate movement, and that Gandhi was always aware of this. "At the Round Table Conference of 1931, the apostle of non-violence declared that he held 'no brief for the terrorists', but added that if the government refused to work with him, it would have the terrorists to deal with. The only way to 'say good-bye to terrorism' was 'to work the Congress for all it is worth'".

=== Social influences ===
The founders of the Samiti were among the leading luminaries of Bengal at the time, advocating for social change in ways far removed from the violent nationalist works that identified the Samiti in later years. The young men of Bengal were among the most active in the Swadeshi movement, prompting R.W. Carlyle to prohibit the participation of students in political meetings on the threat of withdrawal of funding and grants. Bengali intellectuals were already calling for indigenous schools and colleges to replace British institutions, and seeking to build indigenous institutions. Surendranath Tagore, of the Tagore family of Calcutta financed the establishment of Indian-owned banks and insurance companies. The 1906 Congress session in Calcutta established the National Council of Education as a nationalist agency to promote Indian institutions with their own independent curriculum designed to provide skills in technical and technological education that its founders felt would be necessary for building indigenous industries. With the financial backing of Subodh Chandra Mallik, the Bengal National College was established with Aurobindo as Principal. Aurobindo participated in the Indian National Congress at the time. He used his platform in the Congress to present the Samiti as a conglomeration of youth clubs, even as the government raised fears that it was a revolutionary nationalist organisation. During his time as Principal, Aurobindo started the nationalist publications Jugantar, Karmayogin and Bande Mataram. The student's mess at the college was frequented by students of East Bengal who belonged to the Dhaka Anushilan Samiti, and was known to be a hotbed of revolutionary nationalism, which was uncontrolled or even encouraged by the college. Students of the college who later rose to prominence in the Indian revolutionary movement include M. N. Roy. The Samiti's ideologies further influenced patriotic nationalism.

=== Communism in India ===
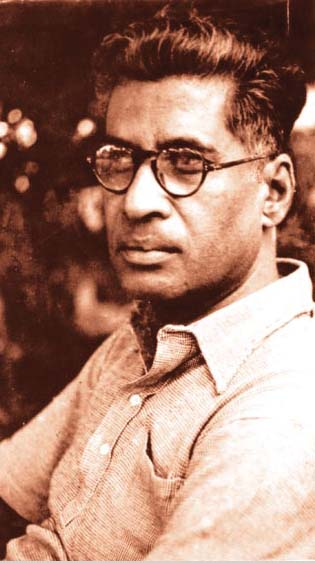
M. N. Roy, one of the founding fathers of Indian Communism as well as the Mexican Communist Party. He was a member of the Comintern.

Through the 1920s and 1930s, many members of the Samiti began identifying with Communism and leftist ideologies. Many of them studied Marxist–Leninist literature while serving long jail sentences. A minority section broke away from the Anushilan movement and joined the Communist Consolidation, and later the Communist Party of India. Former Jugantar leader Narendranath Bhattacharya, now known as M. N. Roy, became an influential member of the Communist International, helping to found the Communist Party of India. The majority of the Anushilanite Marxists hesitated to join the Communist Party. Instead, they joined the Congress Socialist Party (CSP), but kept a separate identity within the party as the Revolutionary Socialist Party (RSP). The RSP held a strong influence in parts of Bengal. The party sent two parliamentarians to the 1952 Lok Sabha elections, both previously Samiti members. In 1969, RSP sympathisers in East Pakistan formed the Shramik Krishak Samajbadi Dal (SKSD). RSP and SKSD have maintained close ties ever since. The RSP is currently a minor partner in the Left Front, which ruled the Indian state of West Bengal for 34 uninterrupted years. It also holds influence in South India, notably in parts of Kerala. The SUCI, another left-wing party with a presence in Bengal, was founded in 1948 by Anushilan members.

== In popular culture ==
The revolutionaries of the Samiti became household names in Bengal. Many of these educated and youthful men were widely admired and romanticised throughout India. Ekbar biday de Ma ghure ashi (Bid me farewell, mother), a 1908 lament written by Bengali folk poet Pitambar Das that mourns the execution of Khudiram Bose, was popular in Bengal decades after Bose's death. The railway station where Bose was arrested is now named Khudiram Bose Pusa Railway Station in his honour.

The 1926 nationalist novel Pather Dabi (Right of the way) by Bengali author Sarat Chandra Chattopadhyay tells the story of a secret revolutionary nationalist organisation fighting the Raj. The protagonist of the novel, Sabyasachi, is believed to have been modelled after Rash Behari Bose, while the revolutionary organisation is thought to have been influenced by the Bengali Samiti. The novel was banned by The Raj as "seditious", but acquired wild popularity. It formed the basis of a 1977 Bengali language film, Sabyasachi, with Uttam Kumar playing the lead role of the protagonist.

Do and Die is a historical account of the Chittagong armoury raid published in 2000 by Indian author Manini Chatterjee. It was awarded the Rabindra Puraskar, the highest literary award in Bengal. The book formed the basis of Khelein Hum Jee Jaan Sey (We Play with Our Lives), a 2010 Bollywood film with Abhishek Bachchan playing the role of Surya Sen.

A marble plaque marks the building in Calcutta where the Samiti was founded. A plaque at the site of Barin Ghose's country house (in present-day Ultadanga) marks the site where Ghosh and his group was arrested in the Alipore bomb case. Many of the Samiti's members are known in India and abroad, and are commemorated in different forms. A number of Calcutta suburbs are today named after revolutionaries and nationalists of the Samiti. Grey Street, where Aurobindo Ghosh's press office stood, is today named Aurobido Sarani (Aurobindo Avenue). Dalhousie Square was renamed B.B.D Bag, named after Benoy, Badal, and Dinesh who raided the Writer's Building in 1926. Mononga lane, the site of Rodda & Co. heist, houses the busts of Anukul Mukherjee, Srish Chandra Mitra, Haridas Dutta, and Bipin Bihary Ganguly who participated in the heist. Chashakhand, a location 15 km east of Balasore where Bagha Jatin and his group made their last stand against Tegart's forces, commemorates the battlefield in Jatin's honour. The locality of Baghajatin in Kolkata is named after Jatin. In Bangladesh, the gallows where Surya Sen was executed are preserved as a historical monument.
