= Indian Press Act, 1910 =

Censorship legislation

Repealed by
- Press Law Repeal and Amendment Act, 1922
- Status: Repealed

The Indian Press Act, 1910 was legislation promulgated in British India imposing strict censorship on all kinds of publications.

The measure was brought into effect to curtail the influence of Indian vernacular and English language in promoting support for what was considered radical Indian nationalism. It followed in the wake of two decades of increasing influence of journals such as Kesari in Western India, publications such as Jugantar and Bande Mataram in Bengal, and similar journals emerging in the United Provinces. These were deemed to influence a surge in nationalist violence and revolutionary terrorism against interests and officials of the Raj in India, particularly in Maharashtra and in Bengal. A widespread influence was noted amongst the general population which drew a large proportion population of youth towards the ideology of radical nationalists such as Bal Gangadhar Tilak and Aurobindo Ghosh, and towards secret revolutionary organisations such as Anushilan Samiti in Bengal and Mitra Mela in Maharashtra. This peaked in 1908, with the attempted assassination of a local judge in Bengal, and a number of assassinations of local Raj officials in Maharashtra. The aftermath of Muzaffarpur bombings saw Tilak convicted on charges of sedition, while in Bengal a large number of nationalists of the Anushilan Samiti were convicted. However, Aurobindo Ghosh had escaped conviction.

With defiant messages from journals such as Jugantar, the provisions of the Vernacular Press Act, 1878 were revived. Herbert Hope Risley, in 1907, declared, "We are overwhelmed with a mass of heterogeneous material, some of it misguided, some of it frankly seditious" in response to a deluge of imagery associated with the Cow Protection Movement. These concerns led him to draft the major substance of the Indian Press Act, 1910.

== Provisions ==
The main instruments of control imposed by the Indian Press Act, 1910 were financial securities which were vulnerable to confiscation in the event of any breach of the exceptionally wide provisions of the legislation. Proprietors being obliged to deposit 500 to 5000 Rupees as the Magistrate saw fit. Customs and postal officers were given authority to detain and examine suspected matter, and local governments were authorised to declare forfeit any newspaper, book, or document, or empower the police to search and seize the same.

The bill defined press offences as attempts to incite murder or anarchical outrages, to tamper with the loyalty of the Army or the Navy, to excite racial, class and religious animosity and hatred and contempt of the Government or a native prince, to incite criminal intimidation and interference with law and order, and to intimidate public servants with threats of injury.
