= Trailokyanath Chakravarty =

Indian independence activist and politician

Trailokyanath Chakraborty
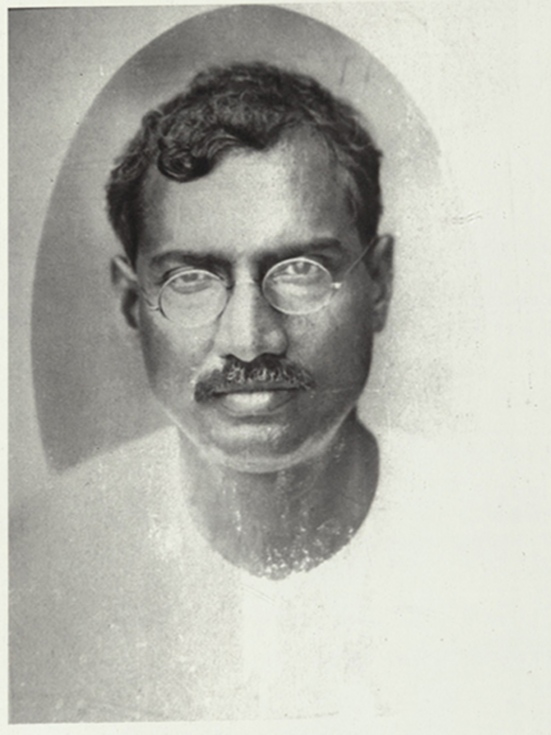
- Born: 2 August 1889; Mymensingh, British India (in present-day Bangladesh)
- Died: 9 August 1970 (aged 81); New Delhi, India
- Other name: Biplabi Trailokya Maharaj
- Political party: Indian National Congress, Pakistan Socialist Party
- Father: Durgacharan Chakraborty

Trailokyanath Chakraborty (2 August 1889 – 9 August 1970) was a British Indian independence activist and later East Pakistani politician. He led and worked with other freedom fighters. He lived for 80 years, spending 30 years in jail. Some of his time in jail was in Bangladesh, which was under Pakistani control, after the partition of India into India and Pakistan. After independence in 1947, he became a politician and parliamentary member from East Pakistan (present-day Bangladesh). In spite of being a freedom fighter and spending much of his life in hiding, he had a strong influence in the family of his brothers, education of grandchildren and their marriage decisions. He inspired many female grandchildren to get higher educational degrees. He was never married.

== Early life ==
Chakravarty was born in 1889 in Kapasiatia district Mymensingh in present-day Bangladesh to his father Durgacharan Chakraborty. He joined the freedom struggle in 1906 at 17 years of age while still in school and became a leader of the Dhaka Anushilan Samiti. He was first arrested for his revolutionary activities in 1908, as a result of that he did not finish his education. However, he could speak 3-4 Indian languages apart from English. Many of these languages he learnt in jail from his fellow prisoners.

In 1912, he was arrested for murder but was released due to lack of evidence. He was arrested again, in Calcutta in 1914, due to his underground revolutionary activities carried out in Rajshahi, Comilla and Malda. He was one of the chief accused in the Barisal Conspiracy Case of 1913, was sentenced by the British and transported to the Andamans as a result.

== Role in freedom struggle ==
Trailokyanath went back to Calcutta on the expiry of his sentence. There he took the charge of the National School. He was arrested once more in 1927 and was sent to a prison at Mandalaya in Burma. He spent six years in the Cellular Jail of Andaman and Nicobar Islands. He was released in 1928 when he joined the Hindustan Republican Army. He participated in the Lahore session of the Indian National Congress in 1929. He was in jail again from 1930 to 1938. After his release, Trailokyanath joined the Ramgarh session of the Indian National Congress. He made a futile attempt to stir rebellion in the British Indian Army during the Second World War. He participated in the Quit India Movement and was again imprisoned in 1942, then released from jail in 1946. He now devoted himself to organisational activities in Noakhali District.

He has spent more than thirty years in several jails across the country including Cellular Jail and Alipore Jail.

== After independence ==
After the partition of India in 1947, Chakravarty joined politics in East Pakistan. He founded the Pakistan Socialist Party. He was elected as a member of the Provincial Assembly in 1954 as a nominee of the United Front. After promulgation of martial law in the country in 1958, an embargo was imposed on his political and social activities. He passed the final years of his life in self-exile at his village home. He wrote two memoirs on contemporary politics entitled Jele Trish Bachhar, Pak-Bharater Swadhinata Sangram. His other contribution is Geetai Swaraj.

=== Death ===
Chakravarty had been suffering from a dilated heart and travelled to Calcutta for treatment in 1970. From there, he was carried to Delhi and was accorded a national reception. He died at 3:30 a.m. (IST) on 9 August that year at the residence of his former associate Surendra Mohan Ghose. His remains were cremated the following day in Calcutta at the Keoratola crematorium. The last rites were performed by his nephew.

A two-minute silence was observed in the Lok Sabha, the lower House of the Indian Parliament, following Chakravarty's death as a mark of respect. India's Prime Minister Indira Gandhi remarked: "His daring and courage inspired young men of older generation. Long years of suffering didn't weaken his belief in democracy or his complete commitment to socialism and secularism."

== Commemoration ==
The Brabourne Road at BBD Bagh, Kolkata is renamed after him as Biplabi Trailokya Maharaj Sarani.
