= Bengal Criminal Law Amendment =

The Bengal Criminal Law Amendment Ordinance of 1924, enacted into law as Bengal Criminal Law Amendment Act in 1925, was a criminal law ordinance enacted in October 1924 in Bengal, in British India. The law was implemented to stem the rise in revolutionary nationalism by the Jugantar group against The Raj in Bengal after 1922. Following the collapse of the Nonviolent movement, the remnants of the Anushilan Samiti reformed under the leadership of Surya Sen, Hem Chandra Kanungo and Bhupendranath Dutta and re-engaged in nationalist independence movements against the Raj. A string of violence through 1923 saw murders of police witnesses and informers, culminating in the attempt to assassinate Charles Tegart by Gopinath Saha, leading to the mistaken killing of another European. In response, following a number of requests from the Governor of Bengal, the ordinance was enacted extending the extraordinary powers of the Regulation III of 1818. It removed rights of Habeas corpus, reintroduced measures of indefinite and arbitrary detentions, and trials by tribunal without jury and without right of appeal. The ordinance was enacted into law in 1925 and remained in force for 5 years. Almost One hundred and fifty people were detained under the law, including among the notable detainees Subhas Chandra Bose, later Congress leader. The act was re-enacted in 1930, and later formed a basis for the Burma Criminal Law Amendment in 1931.

== See also ==
- Defence of India act, 1915
- Rowlatt Act
