= Jogesh Chandra Chatterjee =

Indian politician

Jogesh Chandra Chatterjee (1895 – 2 April 1960) was an Indian freedom fighter, revolutionary and parliamentarian. A founding member of the Hindustan Republican Association (HRA), later the Hindustan Socialist Republican Association (HSRA), he played a pivotal role in the Indian independence movement. Active in the Anushilan Samiti, he was sentenced to life imprisonment for his involvement in the Kakori conspiracy. A political thinker, he authored Indian Revolutionaries in Conference and In Search of Freedom. Post-independence, he served in the Rajya Sabha (1956–1960) and was the founding General Secretary of the Revolutionary Socialist Party. He remains a symbol of armed resistance and socialist ideals.

== Short biography ==
He was a Bengali Hindu. Jogesh Chandra became a member of the Anushilan Samiti. He was one of the founder members of Hindustan Republican Association (HRA) (in 1924) that later became Hindustan Socialist Republican Association. He was arrested several times for revolutionary activities. He was tried in the Kakori conspiracy case in 1926 and received rigorous imprisonment for life.

He wrote two books 1) Indian Revolutionaries In Conference 2) In Search Of Freedom (as biography)

In 1937, Jogesh Chandra joined Congress Socialist party but left it very shortly and formed a new party in 1940 with the name of Revolutionary Socialist Party of which he remained the General Secretary from 1940 to 1953. He was the Vice-President of United Trades Union Congress (the trade union wing of RSP) from 1949 to 1953 and United Socialist Organisation for the year 1949 only.

After independence, however, he returned to the Congress and became a member of the Rajya Sabha from Uttar Pradesh in 1956 and remained its member till his death on 2 April 1960.
