= Charles Stevenson-Moore =

British diplomat

Sir Charles James Stevenson-Moore KCIE CVO (9 June 1866 – 22 July 1947) was a British administrator in India.

Stevenson-Moore was the son of a clergyman and was educated at Felsted School. Admitted to Peterhouse, Cambridge, he later transferred to Emmanuel College, Cambridge. He joined the Indian Civil Service in 1885 and went out to Bengal two years later. He served as Inspector-General of Police of Bengal from 1904 to 1907, when he was appointed Director of Criminal Intelligence of the Government of India. He served as Chief Secretary of Bengal from 1910 to 1914, as a member of the Bengal Board of Revenue from 1914 to 1920, and a member of the Executive Council of Bengal from 1920 to his retirement in 1921.

He was appointed Commander of the Royal Victorian Order (CVO) in 1912 and Knight Commander of the Order of the Indian Empire (KCIE) in the 1920 New Year Honours.

A keen mountaineer, Stevenson-Moore was killed while climbing alone in the Alps near Montreux, Switzerland, at the age of 81.
