= Peter Heehs =

American historian (born 1948)

- Born: 1948 (age 77–78)
- Occupation: Historian

Peter Heehs (born 1948) is an American historian living in Puducherry, India, who writes on modern Indian history, spirituality and religion. Much of his work focuses on the Indian freedom fighter and spiritual leader Sri Aurobindo. His publications include twelve books and more than sixty articles in journals and magazines.

== Biography ==
Peter Heehs was born and educated in the United States, but has lived in India since 1971. He has worked in the team as a researcher at the Sri Aurobindo Ashram Archives since its founding, and has contributed to the re-editing of the Sri Aurobindo Birth Centenary Library and The Complete Works of Sri Aurobindo.

As a historian, Heehs has written on the Swadeshi period of the Indian independence movement and on the early phase of the Indian revolutionary movement. His 1992 study The Bomb in Bengal highlighted the importance of the Maniktala secret society, which was a predecessor of the Jugantar Group. In that book and other publications, Heehs made it clear that the Indian freedom struggle had both violent and non-violent sides and that the violent revolutionaries helped prepare the country psychologically for the later mass movements led by Mahatma Gandhi. In the second edition of The Bomb in Bengal (2004), Heehs distinguished the aims and methods of early Indian revolutionaries.

Heehs has also written on problems of Indian historiography in History and Theory, Postcolonial Studies, and other journals. He has also contributed to popular magazines such as History Today.

As a scholar of religion, Heehs has edited the textbook Indian Religions and has contributed to journals and edited volumes dealing with new religious movements in India. He has also discussed the problems of Indian communalism.

Heehs's ninth book, The Lives of Sri Aurobindo (Columbia University Press, 2008), was intended for scholarly readers. It received positive reviews in the United States but was objected to by a large number of devotees of Sri Aurobindo, who have delayed the publication of the book in India. Heehs's tenth book, Writing the Self, was published by Bloomsbury in February 2013. It has been named an Outstanding Academic Title for 2013 by Choice. His eleventh book, Situating Sri Aurobindo: A Reader, a collection of essays by various scholars on Sri Aurobindo's writings with an introduction, was published by Oxford University Press in October 2013. His twelfth book, Spirituality without God, was published by Bloomsbury in November 2018.

Heehs was briefly in the news in April 2012 after the Indian Ministry of Home Affairs declined to entertain an application for an extension of his resident visa after April 15. Learning of the affair on March 31, Union Home Minister P. Chidambaram said that he would review Heehs’s case. A number of prominent scholars, as well as Union Minister for Rural Development Jairam Ramesh, wrote in support of Heehs to Chidambaram and to Prime Minister Manmohan Singh.

Leading public intellectuals such as Ramachandra Guha and Pratap Bhanu Mehta wrote about the issue in their newspaper columns. On April 13, the Home Ministry announced that it had approved a one-year extension of Heehs’s visa.

The affair became a point of reference in discussions in the Indian and international press of freedom of expression, book banning, censorship, xenophobia, and visa policy.

== See also ==
- Censorship in India
- List of books banned in India

== Books ==
- India's Freedom Struggle (1988)
- Sri Aurobindo: A Brief Biography (1989)
- Modern India and World History (textbook, 1991)
- The Bomb in Bengal: The Rise of Revolutionary Terrorism in India (1993)
- Essential Writings of Sri Aurobindo (1998)
- Nationalism, Terrorism, Communalism: Essays in Modern Indian History (1998)
- Indian Religions: A Historical Reader of Spiritual Expression and Experience (2002)
- Nationalism, Religion and Beyond: Writings on Politics, Society and Culture (2005)
- The Lives of Sri Aurobindo (2008)
- Writing the Self: Diaries, Memoirs, and the History of the Self (2013)
- Situating Sri Aurobindo: A Reader (2013)
- Spirituality without God (2018)
