= Dhaka Anushilan Samiti =

Branch of an Indian anti-British society

Dhaka Anushilan Samiti was a branch of the Anushilan Samiti founded in the city of Dhaka in November 1905. Initially a group of eighty under the leadership of Pulin Behari Das, it "spread like wildfire" throughout the province of East Bengal. More than 500 branches were opened, linked by a "close and detailed organization" to Pulin's headquarters at Dhaka. It absorbed smaller groups in the province and soon overshadowed its parent organization in Calcutta. Branches of Dhaka Anushilan emerged in the towns of Jessore, Khulna, Faridpur, Rajnagar, Rajendrapur, Mohanpur, Barvali, Bakarganj and other places. Estimates of Dhaka Anushilan Samiti's reach show a membership of between 15,000 and 20,000 members.

Within another two years, Dhaka Anushilan would devolve its aims from the Swadeshi movement to the dedicated aim of political terrorism. The Dhaka Anushilan Samiti embarked on a radical program of political terrorism. It broke with the Jugantar group due to differences with Aurobindo's approach of slowly building a base for a revolution with a mass base. The Dhaka group saw this as slow and insufficient and sought immediate action and results. It was responsible for several political assassinations, most notably the murder of D.C. Allen. However, it reached a temporary halt after the arrest and deportation of Pulin Das and the Barisal Conspiracy Case in 1913. Dhaka Anushilan decided not to participate in the German plot of World War I. After the war, it continued in its violent movement, and some of its members went on to form the Neo-violence group.
