= Pramathanath Mitra =

Indian lawyer (1853–1910)

- প্রমথনাথ মিত্র
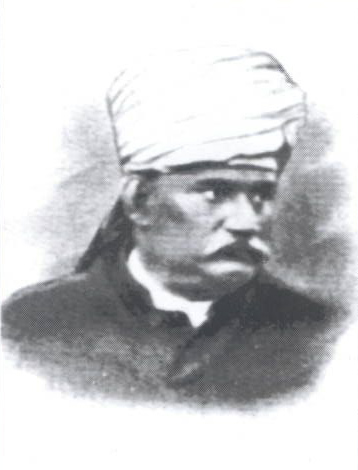
- Born: 30 October 1853; Naihati, Calcutta, British India
- Died: September 23, 1910 (aged 56)
- Other name: P. Mitra
- Occupations: Barrister, Nationalist
- Organization: Anushilan Samiti
- Known for: founder of Anushilan Samiti

Pramathanath Mitra (Bengali: প্রমথনাথ মিত্র; 30 October 1853 – 1910), known widely as P. Mitra, was a Bengali Indian barrister and Indian nationalist who was among the earliest founding members of the Indian revolutionary organisation, Anushilan Samiti.

He was a well-known barrister who practised at the Calcutta High Court and made his mark in the field of criminal law. He was one of the prominent leaders of the new nationalist movement in Bengal. He was born on 30 October 1853 in Naihati village in the district of Twenty-four Parganas, West Bengal. Mitra went to England to study for the bar, returning home in 1875.

Sometime in the early part of 1902, Satish Chandra Bose came to Mitra with a proposal. Satish had been inspired by Nivedita to start a physical culture group, which was called, after a book by Bankim Chandra Chatterjee, the Anushilan Samiti, or Cultural Society. Friends told him that Mitra might be willing to put his weight behind the organization. The barrister was delighted when Satish came calling and accepted his offer to become head of the Samiti. On 24 March 1902, he was elected director of the Bharat Anushilon Samiti set up by Satish Chandra Bose and also took up its financial responsibilities. Around the time Jatin Banerji was setting up his gymnasium in Calcutta. Sri Aurobindo had given him a letter of introduction to Sarala Devi. Jatin met her, Pramathanath Mitra, and others interested in physical culture. Mitra suggested that Jatin and Satish join forces. The two agreed, and in March 1902 a new, expanded Anushilan Samiti was founded.

In February 1903, Sri Aurobindo had discussions with Pramathanath Mitra, whom he initiated into the secret society. The two agreed on the overall line of approach: establish samitis throughout the province, provide training in physical culture, and, when the time was right, introduce revolutionary ideas.

Apart from practising as a barrister at the High Court, Mitra used to teach at Ripon College. Mitra's writings include a novel, Yogi, Tarkatattva, Jati O Dharma, and History of the Intellectual Progress of India.

Pramathanath was a disciple of Yogi Bejoy Goswami and was also greatly influenced by Swami Vivekananda.

Mitra's writings include a novel, Yogi, Tarkatattva, Jati O Dharma, and History of the Intellectual Progress of India.
