= Ekbar Biday De Ma Ghure Ashi =

Bengali patriotic song

"Ekbar Biday De Maa Ghure Asi"

Song by Several artists
- Language: Bengali
- Genre: Patriotic
- Songwriter: Pitambar Das
- Composer: Pitambar Das

"Ekbar biday de Ma ghure ashi" (Bengali: একবার বিদায় দে মা ঘুরে আসি, "Bid me farewell once Mother, I will be back soon") is a Bengali patriotic song written by Pitambar Das. This song was composed in honour of Khudiram Bose. This song is still very popular in West Bengal.

== Background ==
Khudiram Bose was the first Bengali rebel hanged by the British Government during the Indian National Movement. Khudiram took part in armed revolution against the British Raj, was sentenced to death, and hanged on 11 August 1908. At that time he was only 18 years old. The song was written on the occasion of Khudiram's death. It was celebrated as a farewell song by Khudiram.

== Theme ==
The song was written when young Khudiram was hanged to death. In the song, Khudiram is asking his mother to bid him goodbye since he is going to die. The song goes on – "Let me wear the noose round my neck with pleasure. I'll come back in due time. Let the world be witness."

== Lyrics ==
Bengali script

একবার বিদায় দে মা ঘুরে আসি।
হাসি হাসি পরব ফাঁসি দেখবে ভারতবাসী।

কলের বোমা তৈরি করে
দাঁড়িয়ে ছিলেম রাস্তার ধারে মাগো,
বড়লাটকে মারতে গিয়ে
মারলাম আরেক ইংলন্ডবাসী।

হাতে যদি থাকতো ছোরা
তোর ক্ষুদি কি পড়তো ধরা মাগো
রক্ত-মাংসে এক করিতাম
দেখতো জগতবাসী

শনিবার বেলা দশটার পরে
জজকোর্টেতে লোক না ধরে মাগো
হল অভিরামের দ্বীপ চালান মা
ক্ষুদিরামের ফাঁসি

বারো লক্ষ তেত্রিশ কোটি
রইলো মা তোর বেটা বেটি মাগো
তাদের নিয়ে ঘর করিস মা
ওদের করিস দাসী

দশ মাস দশদিন পরে
জন্ম নেব মাসির ঘরে মাগো
তখন যদি না চিনতে পারিস
দেখবি গলায় ফাঁসি।

Bengali phonetic transcription

Ekbaar biday de ma ghure ashi
Hasi hasi porbo phnashi dekhbe bharatbasi

Koler boma toiri kore
Dnariye chhilam rastar dhare Ma go
Borolatke marte giye
Marlam aarek Englandbashi

Haate jodi thakto chhora
Tor Khudi ki porto dhora
Rokte-mangshe ek koritam
Dekhto jagatbashi

Shonibaar bela doshtar pore
Judgecourtete lok na dhore Ma go
Holo Abhiram-er dwip chalan Ma
Khudiram-er phnashi

Baro lokkho tetris koti
Roilo Ma tor beta beti
tader niye ghor koris Ma
Oder koris dasi

Dosh mash dosh din pore
Jonmo nebo mashir ghore Ma go
Tokhon jodi na chinte paris
Dekhbi golay phnashi

English translation

Bid me farewell once mother, I will be back soon.
Whole of India will watch me while I wear the noose smiling

With me I had a bomb I'd made
Waiting by the roadside O Mother
Trying to kill the Governor,
Killed some other Englishmen

Had I had a dagger on me
You think they could have caught me?
Would have made a blood bath
And the world would have watched that

On Saturday morning after 10AM
The Judge Court Road will be packed with people O Mother
Abhiram was deported to an island,
Khudiram will hang by the neck

12 lakhs and 33 crores
Is the number of sons and daughters you will still have left O Mother
Build your family around them
Make them your servants

10 months and 10 days from now
I shall be born to my maternal aunt O Mother
If you don't recognize me
Look for the mark of strangulation (from the noose) around my neck.
