= Gopinath Saha =

Gopinath Saha or Gopi Mohan Saha (7 December 1905 – 1 March 1924) was a Bengali activist for Indian independence (from British rule) and member of the Indian independence movement On 12 January 1924, he attempted to assassinate Charles Tegart, a leader in the fight against revolutionary movements and the then head of the Detective Department of Calcutta Police. Saha's attempt failed as he erroneously killed Ernest Day (born 1888), a white civilian who had gone there on official business. Saha was arrested, tried and, on 1 March 1924, hanged, in Alipore Central Jail.

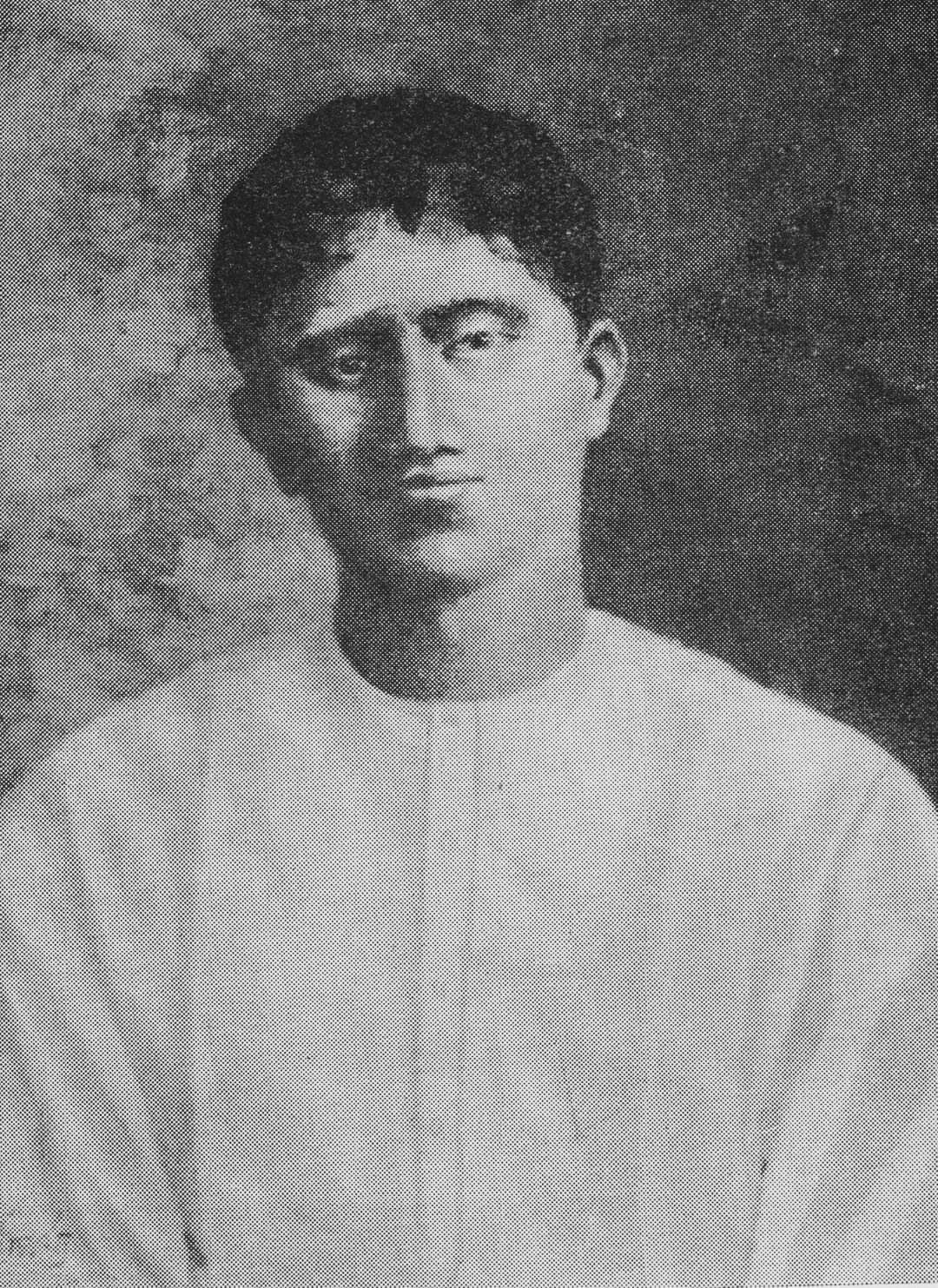
Gopinath Saha

He was born in the town of Srirampur, whose erstwhile name was Serampore of undivided Bengal.
