= Pulin Behari Das =

Indian Bengali revolutionary (1877–1949)

- Pulin Behari Das
- Born: 28 January 1877; Lonesingh, Bengal Presidency, British India
- Died: 17 August 1949 (aged 72); Kolkata, West Bengal, India
- Occupation: Revolutionary
- Parent: Naba Kumar

Pulin Behari Das (28 January 1877 – 17 August 1949) was an Indian revolutionary and the founder-president of the Dhaka Anushilan Samiti.

== Early life ==
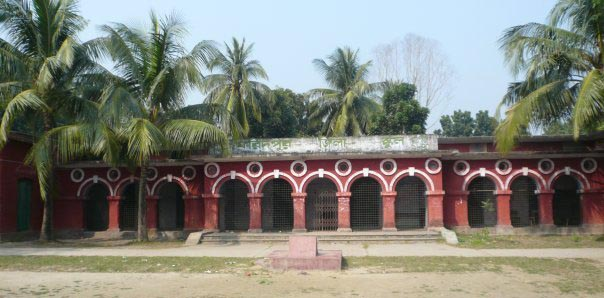
Faridpur Zilla School, where he studied

Pulin came from a middle class Bengali Hindu family. Though they held some landed property they were mostly employed in colonial jobs. His father was an advocate at the sub-divisional court in Madaripur. One of his uncles was a Deputy Magistrate while another was munsif. Pulin was born to Naba Kumar Das in the village of Lonesingh, in the district of Shariatpur in the year 1877.

Pulin passed the Entrance examination from Faridpur Zilla School in 1894. He attended the Dhaka College and became the laboratory assistant and demonstrator while still a student at the college. From his childhood Pulin was attracted to physical culture. He was a very good lathial. Inspired by the success of Sarala Devi's akhada in Kolkata, he opened an akhara at Tikatuli in 1903. In 1905, he trained in fencing and lathi khela under Murtaza, the famous lathial.

== Career ==
In September, 1906, Bipin Chandra Pal and Pramatha Nath Mitra took a tour of the newly created province of Eastern Bengal and Assam. The latter, while delivering his speech, asked them to come forward who were willing to sacrifice their lives for their country and Pulin had stepped forward. Subsequently, he was nominated to organize the Dhaka chapter of the Anushilan Samiti. In October, Pulin founded the Dhaka chapter with 80 young men.

Pulin was a remarkable organizer and the Samiti soon had over 500 branches in the province.

Pulin founded the National School in Dhaka. It was basically built as a training ground for raising a revolutionary force. In the beginning the students were trained with lathis and wooden swords. Afterwards they were groomed with daggers and finally with pistols and revolvers.

Pulin masterminded the plot to eliminate Basil Copleston Allen, the erstwhile District Magistrate of Dhaka. On 23 December 1907, when Mr. Allen was on his way back to England, he was shot through his body at the Goalundo railway station but he narrowly escaped with his life. A few days after the incident a gang of around 400 Muslim rioters attacked Pulin at his residence chanting anti-Hindu slogans. He staved off the rioters bravely with barely a handful of his associates.

In early 1908, Pulin organized the sensational Barrah Dacoity. The audacious dacoity was committed in broad daylight by a group of revolutionaries at the residence of the zamindar of Barrah, under the Nawabganj police station in the district of Dhaka. The fund was used for buying arms and ammunition.

In 1908 he was arrested along with Bhupesh Chandra Nag, Shyam Sundar Chakravarti, Krishna Kumar Mitra, Subodh Mallick and Ashwini Dutta and interred in Montgomery jail. After his release from jail in 1910, he began to rejuvenate the revolutionary activities. Around this time the Dhaka group began to operate independently of the Kolkata group. After the demise of Pramatha Nath Mitra, the two bodies separated.

In July, 1910, Pulin was arrested again along with 46 other revolutionaries on charges of sedition. Later another 44 revolutionaries were arrested. This came to be known as the Dhaka Conspiracy Case. After the trial Pulin was awarded lifelong imprisonment. He was transferred to the Cellular Jail where he found himself in the company of revolutionaries like Hem Chandra Kanungo, Barindra Kumar Ghosh and Vinayak Savarkar.

After the war Pulin's term was reduced and he was released from jail in 1918 but kept in house arrest for another year. In 1919, when he was totally released, he once again tried to revive the activities of the Samiti. The organization had been banned and its members were scattered here and there, and there was only a lukewarm response. At the Nagpur Congress and later at Kolkata, the majority of the surviving revolutionaries accepted in principle the leadership of Mohandas Gandhi and decided to support the Non-Cooperation Movement. Pulin, however, remained a steadfast and declined to comprise with ideals and refused to accept the leadership of Mohandas Gandhi. As the Samiti was then a banned outfit, he founded the Bharat Sevak Sangh in 1920 to carry on the revolutionary activities. Under the patronage of barrister S.R.Das he publishes two periodicals Hak Katha and Swaraj through which he began to spread the revolutionary ideas. He began to criticize the Congress policy of non-violence. The Samiti continued to exist in secrecy, however, his differences with the Samiti began to surface. He severed all his links with the Samiti, dissolved Bharat Sevak Sangha and retired from active politics in 1922.

In 1928, he founded the Bangiya Byayam Samiti, at Mechhuabazar in Kolkata. It was an institute of physical culture and effectively an akhada where he began to train young men in stick wielding, swordplay and wrestling. He would also train in Judo and jujutsu under the dual tutelage of Shinzo Takagaki and Jinnosuke Sano.

== Later life ==
He came under the influence of a yogi and the feeling of non-attachment grew in him. He married and had three sons and two daughters. After that time till date Bangiya Byayam samiti was successfully run by his second son Sourendra till date 2005. Presently his grand sons Biswaranjan and Manishranjan are seeking professional and governmental help to rebuild the ideals of PulinBihari. At that time Swami Satyananda Giri and his friends used to frequent his place and hold satsangs at a nearby cottage.

== Legacy ==
The University of Calcutta has a Special Endowment Medal named after him, called the Pulin Bihari Das Smriti Padak.
