= Bande Mataram (publication) =

English language newspaper

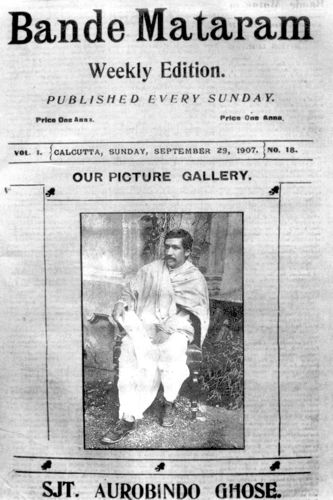
- The 29 September 1907 front page of the weekly edition of Bande Mataram
- Type: Weekly newspaper
- Format: Broadsheet
- Political alignment: Nationalist
- Language: English

The Bande Mataram was an English language weekly newspaper published from Calcutta (now Kolkata) founded in 1905 by Bipin Chandra Pal and edited by Sri Aurobindo.

Its aim was to prepare Indians to struggle for complete independence. It was a daily organ of Indian nationalism. It was accused of spreading 'radical Indian nationalism' and 'nationalist extremism'. According to S. K. Ratcliffe, a previous editor of The Statesman, in a letter to the Manchester Guardian of 28 December 1950, "It had a full-size sheet, was clearly printed on green paper, and was full of leading and special articles written in English with a brilliance and pungency not hitherto attained in the Indian Press. It was the most effective voice of what we then called nationalist extremism."

The two decades of increasing influence of journals such as Bande Mataram in Bengal, and similar journals emerging in the United Provinces led to a strict government censorship under the Press Act 1910.

== Sources ==
- The Making of India: A Historical Survey, by Ranbir Vohra.2000. M.E. Sharpe.ISBN 0765607115.p 111
- A History of Indian Literature in English, by Arvind Krishna Mehrotra.2003. C. Hurst & Co. Publishers. ISBN 1-85065-680-0.p 118
- The Essential Aurobindo, by Robert A. McDermott. 1988. SteinerBooks. ISBN 0-940262-22-3. p43
- The Hour of God: Selections From His Writings, by Manoj Das.1995 Sahitya Akademi.ISBN 8172018886.p v
