= Chandranagar =

Chandranagar may refer to the following places:

- Chandranagar, Palakkad district, Kerala
- Chandranagar, Dahanu, Maharashtra
- Chandranagar, Chhatarpur district, Madhya Pradesh
- Chandranagar, Ratnagiri district, Maharashtra
- Chandranagar, Lucknow district, Uttar Pradesh
- Chandranagar Rural Municipality, Sarlahi District, Nepal
- Chandernagore, West Bengal; now known as Chandannagar
