= Basabi Pal =

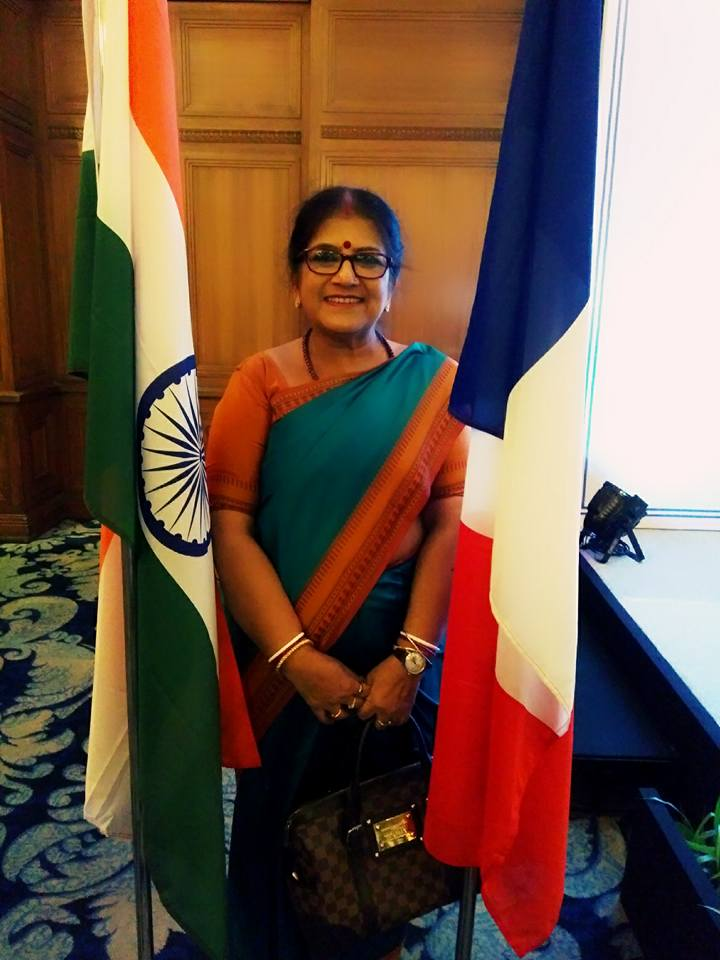
- Born: October 1958 (age 67); Calcutta, West Bengal, India
- Education: St. Joseph's Convent, Chandernagore; Institut De Chandernagor; Chandernagore Government College; Alliance Française; Jawaharlal Nehru University, Delhi; La Sorbonne
- Occupations: Former Head of The Department of French, Chandernagore Government College
- Spouse: Gautam Pal
- Children: Dyootiman Pal, Dhritiman Pal
- Parents: Anil Chandra Ghosh (father); Usha Rani Ghosh (mother)

Basabi Pal (née Ghosh; born October 1958) is an Indian academic currently serving as Head of the Department of French at Chandernagore Government College. Born in the Royal Family of Sheoraphuli she resides in the heritage town of Chandernagore with her family. Ambassador of France to India Alexandre Ziegler has conferred the insignia of Knight of the Order of Academic Palms (Ordre des Palmes Académiques) on Basabi Pal for her "outstanding contribution" towards the promotion of French language in her three decades of service.

== Education ==
After passing the Indian School Certificate Exam in 1st division from St. Joseph's Convent, Chandernagore in 1974 she got into Institut De Chandernagor to study French and was awarded 1st Class first in all the four consecutive exams. After completing her bachelor's degree in French from University of Burdwan as a gold medalist she also got her Diplôme d'études en langue française from Alliance Française, Paris in 1979 with Très honorable avec félicitations. In 1981 she completed her master's degree in French from Jawaharlal Nehru University, Delhi and was awarded French Government scholarship in the year 1982–83 to complete her Diplôme de Professeur de Français à l'Étranger, Université Paris III, La Sorbonne Nouvelle, Paris.

== Career ==
Post her education she joined Chandernagore Govt. College as part-time teacher in French and currently is the Associate Professor and Head of the Department of French. Pal seeks to preserve the heritage of Chandernagore and promote French language at the school level in Bengal. She is also the President of Sheoraphuli Raj Debuttar Estate, Sheoraphuli.
