= SJCC =

The initialism SJCC may refer to:

== Education ==
- San Jose City College, a community college in San Jose, California, U.S.
- Southwest Junior College Conference, a junior college athletics conference in the U.S.
- Spring Joint Computer Conference, a U.S. computer conference from 1962–1973
- St. Joseph's College of Commerce, a Jesuit college in Bangalore, India
- St Joseph's Convent, Chandannagar, a Catholic all-girls school in the Indian state of West Bengal

== Organizations ==
- San Jose Chamber of Commerce in San Jose, California, United States
