= Très Honorable =

Très Honorable may refer to:

- The Right Honourable
- Mention très honorable, Latin honors in France for doctor's degrees
  - Très Honorable
  - Très honorable avec félicitations
