= Kanailal Vidyamandir =

High school in Chandannagar, India

Location
- Barabazar, Chandannagar, West Bengal, 712136; India; 22.8582587°N 88.367687°E

Information
- Former name: Dupleix College
- Established: 1862
- Founder: Father Barthet
- School board: WBBSE, WBCHSE
- Oversight: West Bengal Govt. and Chandannagar Municipal Corporation
- Age range: 5 years to 18 years
- Language: Bengali
- Campus type: Urban

Kanailal Vidyamandir is one of the oldest schools in Hooghly district in the state of West Bengal, India. Established in 1862, the school is located at Grand Trunk Road in Chandannagar.

== History ==
Kanailal Vidyamandir was established as the "Saint Mary's Institution" by Father Maglayer Barthet in 1862. As Chandannagar was a French colony, the school initially taught only in French. English education began in 1872 by the then Puducherry French government.

In 1887 the institution was taken over by the French government, and in 1901 "Saint Mary's Institution" was renamed "Dupleix College". In 1908 the college department of "Dupleix College" was abolished, but was later restored in 1931 by the efforts of Charu Chandra Ray, Harihar Seth and Narayan Chandra Dey.

On 17 May 1948, just before the liberation from French rule, the school was renamed Kanailal Vidyamandir after the Bengali revolutionary Shahid Kanailal Dutta, a student of the school.

The school celebrated its 150th anniversary in 2012. Kanailal Vidyamandir celebrated its 160th anniversary in 2022 with six-month long festivities. The celebration began with a ceremony in the school on 18 August, followed by a road rally on 19 August 2022. It ended on 30 January 2023.

== Sections ==
The school is divided into two sections: the English Section and the French Section. These sections run from separate buildings situated on opposite sides of the Barabazar Main Road.

The English Section is from Primary to Higher Secondary, and the French Section is from Primary to Class 10. After Class 10, students from the French Section either get transferred to the English Section or to a different school.

== Heritage status ==
The school’s Colonial architecture features a building made of brick and lime and a wooden roof. It was declared as heritage in 2017 by the West Bengal Heritage Commission.

== Notable alumni ==
- Kanailal Dutta
- Rash Behari Bose
- Abhishek Porel

== See also ==
- Education in India
- List of schools in India
- Education in West Bengal
