= 1949 Chandernagore plebiscite =

1949 public vote on the integration of French Chandernagore into India

- 19 June 1949
- Do you want the town of Chandernagore to merge with India or remain within the French Union?

Results
Choice	Votes	%
Merge with India	7,463	98.50%
Remain with the French Union	114	1.50%
Valid votes	7,577	100.00%
Invalid or blank votes	0	0.00%
Total votes	7,577	100.00%
Registered voters/turnout	12,000	63.14%

The 1949 Chandernagore plebiscite (also known as the 1949 Chandernagore referendum) was a public vote held on 19 June 1949 in the French colonial enclave of Chandernagore (now Chandannagar, located in West Bengal, India). The electoral exercise requested registered residents to choose between two political pathways: remaining an autonomous territory within the French Union or executing a complete political merger with the newly independent Dominion of India.

The referendum resulted in a landslide, with 98.5% of voting residents opting to join India. The peaceful outcome served as a critical democratic precedent for the broader, eventual decolonization of the remaining French-administered territories across the Indian subcontinent.

== Background ==
Chandernagore was originally established as a French trading post on the western bank of the Hooghly River in 1673 by permission of the Mughal Governor of Bengal. Following the passage of the Indian Independence Act 1947, the local municipal population, heavily influenced by regional anti-colonial movements in West Bengal, intensified local agitations demanding immediate termination of French governance.

To de-escalate civic tensions, the French colonial administration and the Government of India signed a formal bilateral declaration on 8 June 1948, stipulating that the municipal citizens of French India enclaves would have the sovereign legal right to determine their political future through a democratic plebiscite.

== Referendum results ==
The plebiscite was conducted on 19 June 1949 under joint administrative observation. Out of approximately 12,000 registered voters from a total localized population of roughly 50,000, participation was high and free of major civic disruption.

The certified administrative outcome was recorded as follows:

1949 Chandernagore Plebiscite Results
Choice	Votes	%
Merge with India	7,463	98.50%
Remain with the French Union	114	1.50%
Valid votes	7,577	100.00%

== Aftermath and cession ==
In direct response to the absolute mandate, the Government of France initiated a phased structural withdrawal. On 2 May 1950, France handed over de facto administrative control of the town to the Indian government.

A formal international bilateral accord, titled the Treaty of Cession of the Territory of the Free Town of Chandernagore, was signed between representatives of India and France in Paris on 2 February 1951. Following ratification by the French National Assembly, the de jure sovereign transfer took place on 9 June 1952. On 2 October 1954, the region was officially integrated into the Hooghly district of West Bengal under the provisions of The Chandernagore (Merger) Act, 1954.

== See also ==
- Goa Opinion Poll
- Political integration of India
- French India
