= Bibhuti Bhusan Nandy =

Bibhuti Bhusan Nandy (Bengali: বিভূতিভূষণ নন্দী) (1940–2008) was an Indian IPS officer, intelligence agent, former National Security Advisor of Mauritius and a columnist. He served in the Intelligence Bureau, Research and Analysis Wing and the Indo-Tibetan Border Police in various capacities, playing a key role in the Bangladesh Liberation War.

== Education ==
He was born in Jamalpur, in what is now Bangladesh. He graduated in economics from the renowned Scottish Church College and earned his MA degree from the University of Calcutta.

== Career ==
He taught at the Chandernagore Government College in 1958, which was then affiliated with the University of Calcutta. He joined the Orissa cadre of the Indian Police Service in 1964, but was subsequently deputed to the Intelligence Bureau in Delhi to play a key role in the Bangladesh war of liberation. He has served in various capacities in Odisha including the Superintendent of Police of Baleshwar District back in the early 1980s.

In recognition of his meritorious service he was put in charge of the Kashmir desk in the rank of deputy director of Intelligence Bureau. In 1984, he was transferred to the country's counter intelligence outfit Research and Analysis Wing, where his first posting was in Dhaka. He also served in Bangkok.

He was thereafter brought back to the RAW headquarters in Delhi to look after important regions including Myanmar, Russia and South East Asia. Subsequently, he was made a special director of Special Services Bureau and was later promoted to the rank of additional secretary within RAW.

In 1997, he was made the director-general of Indo-Tibetan Border Police and after serving a year there, his services were requisitioned by the Mauritius government which appointed him as its National Security Adviser. When Nandy retired in 2000, Prime Minister Sir Anerood Jugnauth made an offer to Nandy to come back to Mauritius as NSA.

After retirement, he regularly contributed articles on national security to The Statesman and Dainik Statesman.

== Primary reference ==
- Obituary in The Statesman
