= Chandernagore Government College =

College in West Bengal, India

- Collège gouvernemental de Chandernagor
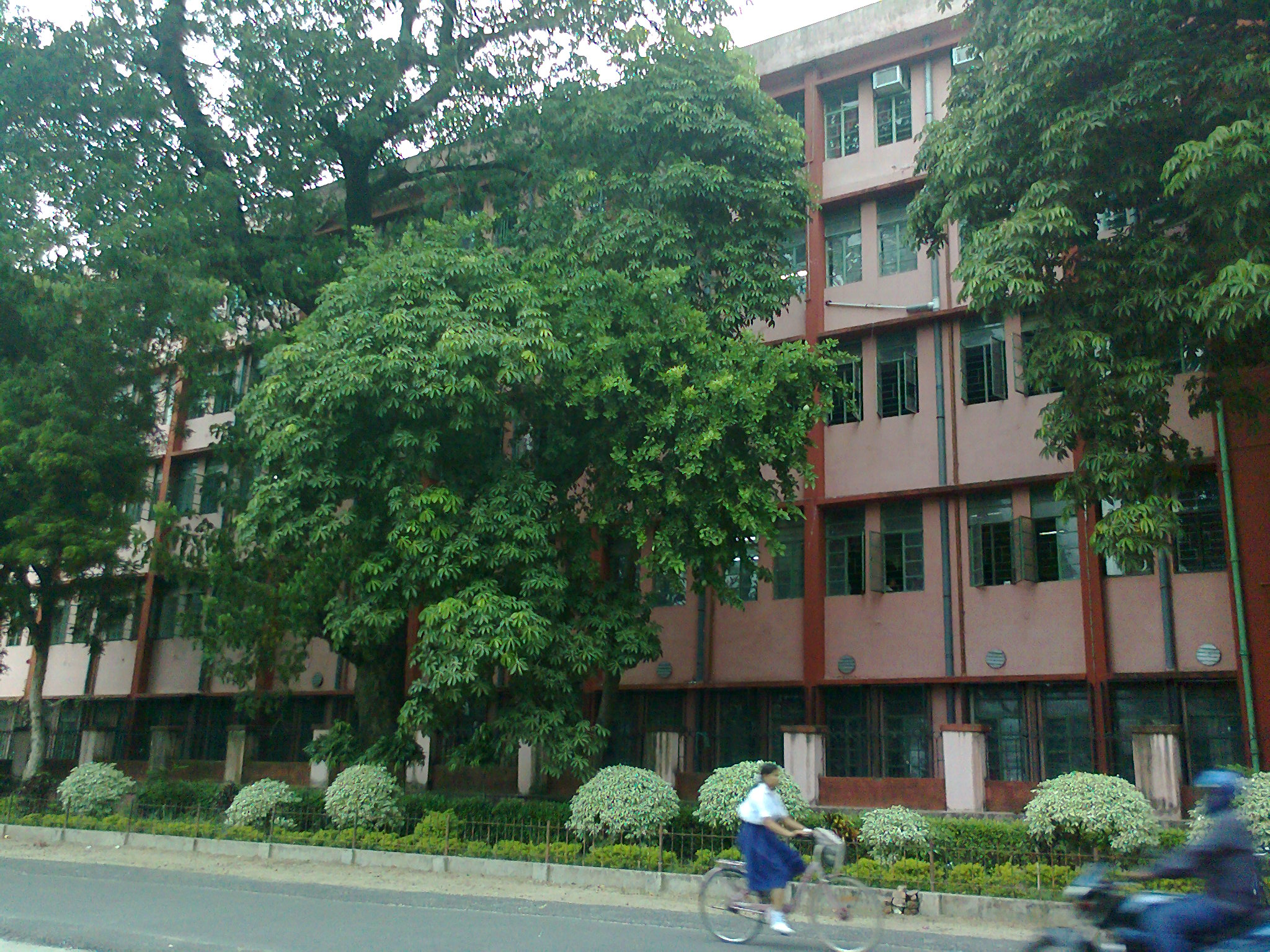
- Former names: Duple College (Indo-French college)
- Type: Public college
- Established: 1862; 164 years ago
- Affiliations: University of Burdwan
- Principal: Debasish Sarkar
- Location: Strand Rd, Barabazar, Chandannagar, West Bengal, 731216, India; 22.8578787°N 88.3690891°E
- Campus: Urban
- Website: https://www.chandernagorecollege.ac.in/
- Location in West Bengal Chandernagore Government College (India)

Chandernagore Government College, also known as Dupleix College (Bengali: চন্দননগর সরকারি কলেজ; French: Collège gouvernemental de Chandernagor) is a government college in Chandannagar, West Bengal, India. It is one of the oldest colleges in Hooghly district. It offers undergraduate courses in arts, commerce, and sciences. It is affiliated to the University of Burdwan.

== History ==
It is the oldest college of the district having glorious past. Initially it was St. Mary's Institution founded in 1862 by the French Catholic Missionary, Rev. Magloire Barthet. The institution was renamed as Dupleix College in 1901, in memory of Governor General Joseph François Dupleix. At the time of Indian independence movement, this college became a centre of revolutionary activities. Professor Charuchandra Ray was the mentor of Bengali revolutionaries. The college received official recognition by the French government and was brought under the French Education Directorate only in June 1938. In 1947 the college was again renamed as Chandernagore College.

== Departments and courses ==
The college offers different undergraduate and postgraduate courses and aims at imparting education to the undergraduates of lower- and middle-class people of Chandernagore and its adjoining areas.

=== Science ===
Science faculty consists of the departments of Chemistry, Physics, Mathematics, Computer Science, Botany, Zoology, Environmental Science, and Economics.

=== Arts & Commerce ===
Arts and Commerce faculty consists of departments of Bengali, English, Sanskrit, French, History, Geography, Political Science, Philosophy, Education, Sociology, and Commerce (Accountancy).

== Accreditation ==
The college is recognized by the University Grants Commission (UGC).

== Notable faculty ==
- Bibhuti Bhusan Nandy, spymaster and columnist
- Basabi Pal, professor of French
- Ranajit Guha, eminent historian

== See also ==
- List of institutions of higher education in West Bengal
- Education in India
- Education in West Bengal
- List of Jesuit sites
