= Neline Mondal =

Belgian-born heritage conservationist and social activist in India

- Born: Néline Colassin; Leuven, Belgium
- Education: École normale supérieure
- Occupations: Artist; heritage conservationist; teacher; social worker; cultural activist
- Years active: 1988–present
- Spouse: Ujjal Mondal

Neline Mondal (Note: French: Néline Mondal, French pronunciation: [nelin mɔ̃dal]; Bengali pronunciation: [nelin mɔɳɖɔl]).) (née Colassin) is a Belgian-born artist, heritage conservationist, teacher, social worker and cultural activist based in India. She is best known for her work in heritage preservation in Chandannagar, West Bengal, and for her efforts to promote the Bengali language, culture, and built heritage.

== Early life and education ==
Mondal was born in Belgium and grew up in the Netherlands. She later moved to Paris for higher education, where she studied at the École normale supérieure – PSL and earned advanced degrees in the life sciences, including a triple master's in physiology, cellular biology, and biochemistry.

== Career ==
=== Arrival in India ===
In 1988, at the age of 24, Mondal arrived in Calcutta (now Kolkata) as part of a UNESCO delegation working on HIV/AIDS awareness in India. During her stay, she developed an interest in the former French colonial town of Chandannagar, particularly its Jagaddhatri Puja celebrations and architectural heritage.

She first visited Chandannagar on a weekend trip and was introduced to Ujjal Mondal, a local heritage worker involved in the restoration of the French Institute under a UNESCO project. The two married in 1989.

=== Life in Chandannagar ===
After her marriage, Mondal settled in Chandannagar and moved into the Mondal Mansion, a French colonial-era house built in 1741 on the banks of the Hooghly River. The mansion, also known as Chine Bari, originally contained around 85 rooms and was partially damaged over time due to floods, earthquakes, and river erosion.

Mondal has described her transition from scientist to heritage conservationist as a result of her immersion into the Mondal family's historical legacy and the surrounding built heritage.

=== Heritage conservation work ===
Mondal became actively involved in heritage conservation following the restoration of the French Institute in Chandannagar, a project funded by the late French president François Mitterrand. She later became general secretary of the Human Heritage Charitable Trust in 2011, which works in education, poverty alleviation, socio-economic development, healthcare, environmental protection, and heritage preservation.

She is a member of the heritage initiative The Heritage & People of Chandernagore, developed in collaboration with the Embassy of France in India, aimed at protecting historical structures and promoting public awareness.

=== Mondal family history ===
The Mondal family is historically associated with Chandannagar's mercantile and zamindari traditions. According to family records and oral history, the Mondals were traders in salt, swords, wine, and grains, and later earned significant wealth by escorting merchant ships through pirate-infested waters of the Hooghly River. The family reportedly maintained a private armed force and entered agreements with Portuguese pirates to ensure safe passage for ships bearing their flag.

Family tradition holds that the Mondals ranked among the twenty wealthiest families in India in the late eighteenth century, and that the Mondal Mansion was among the largest private residences in the French colonies of India.

=== Cultural associations ===
Mondal has documented the cultural history of Chandannagar and the Mondal Mansion, including its association with the poet-singer Anthony Firingee, who is believed to have managed a family salt godown and performed devotional songs in the mansion's ballroom.

She has also worked to preserve the memory of historical figures associated with Chandannagar, including mathematician and surveyor Radhanath Sikdar, and played a role in securing approval for the installation of his statue near the Chandannagar Corporation building.

=== Language and cultural integration ===
Mondal learned Bengali through listening and daily interaction after arriving in West Bengal and later learned to read and write the language with the help of her husband using the traditional primer Barnaparichay. She has frequently expressed admiration for Bengali literature and culture, citing Rabindranath Tagore and Sri Aurobindo, and has spoken about celebrating Pohela Boishakh and Durga Puja as part of her cultural life in Bengal.

== Personal life ==
Neline Mondal is married to Ujjal Mondal, also a heritage conservationist who has received a National Award in India for his work in protecting tribal heritage. The couple reside in Chandannagar, West Bengal, where they continue their heritage conservation and cultural advocacy.
