= Chandannagar =

Chandannagar: Chandernagor; Chandernagore
- City
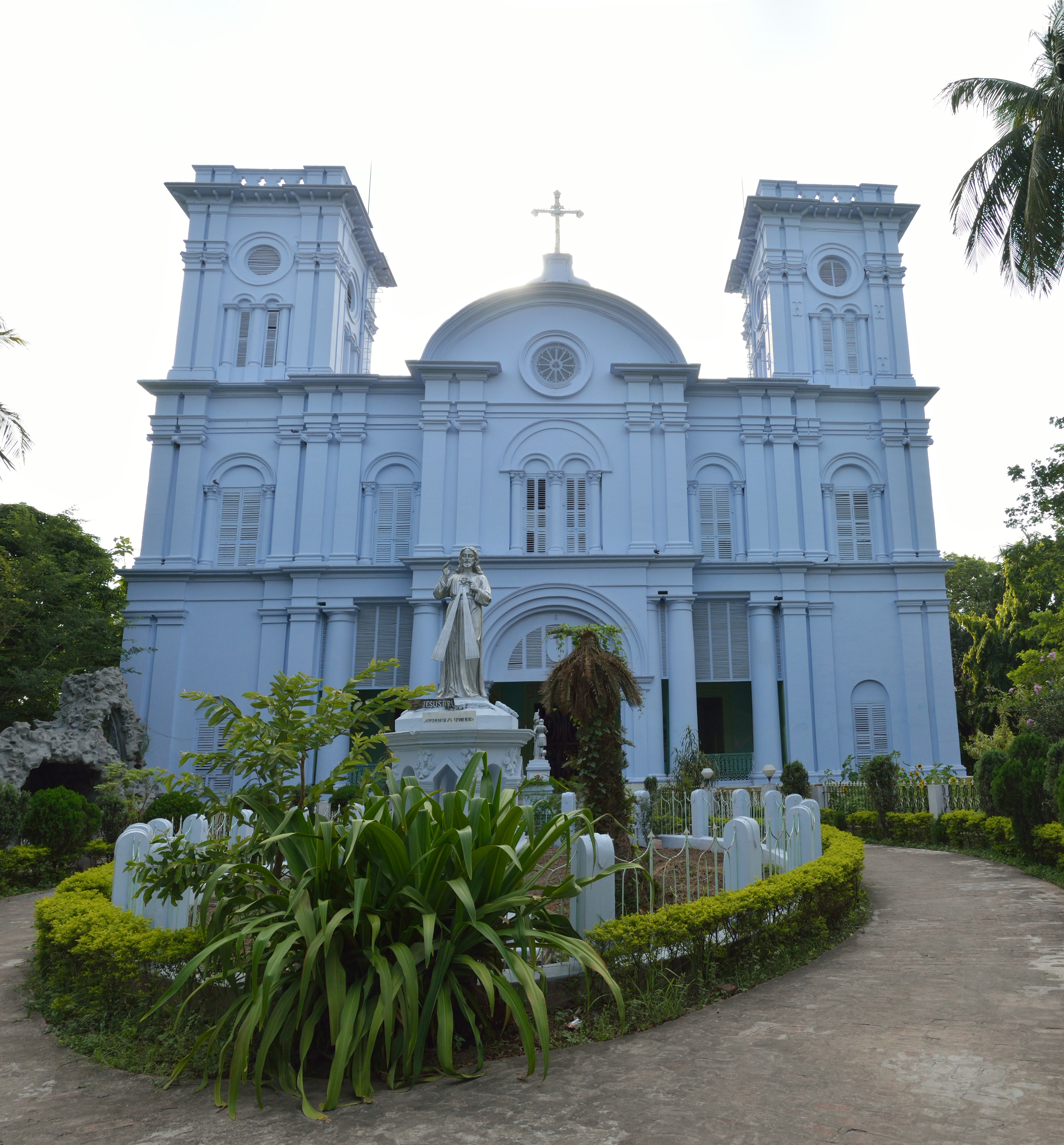
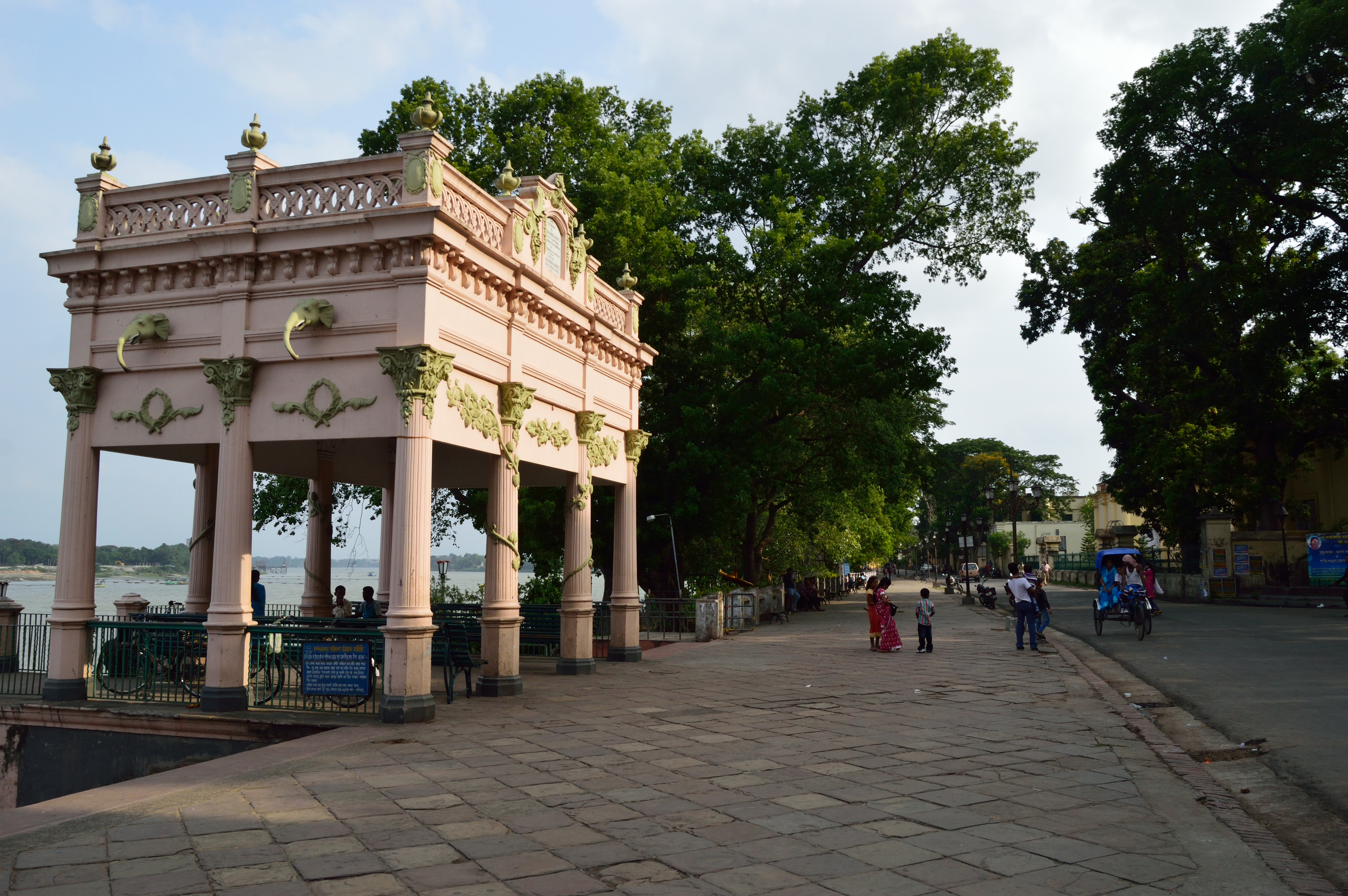
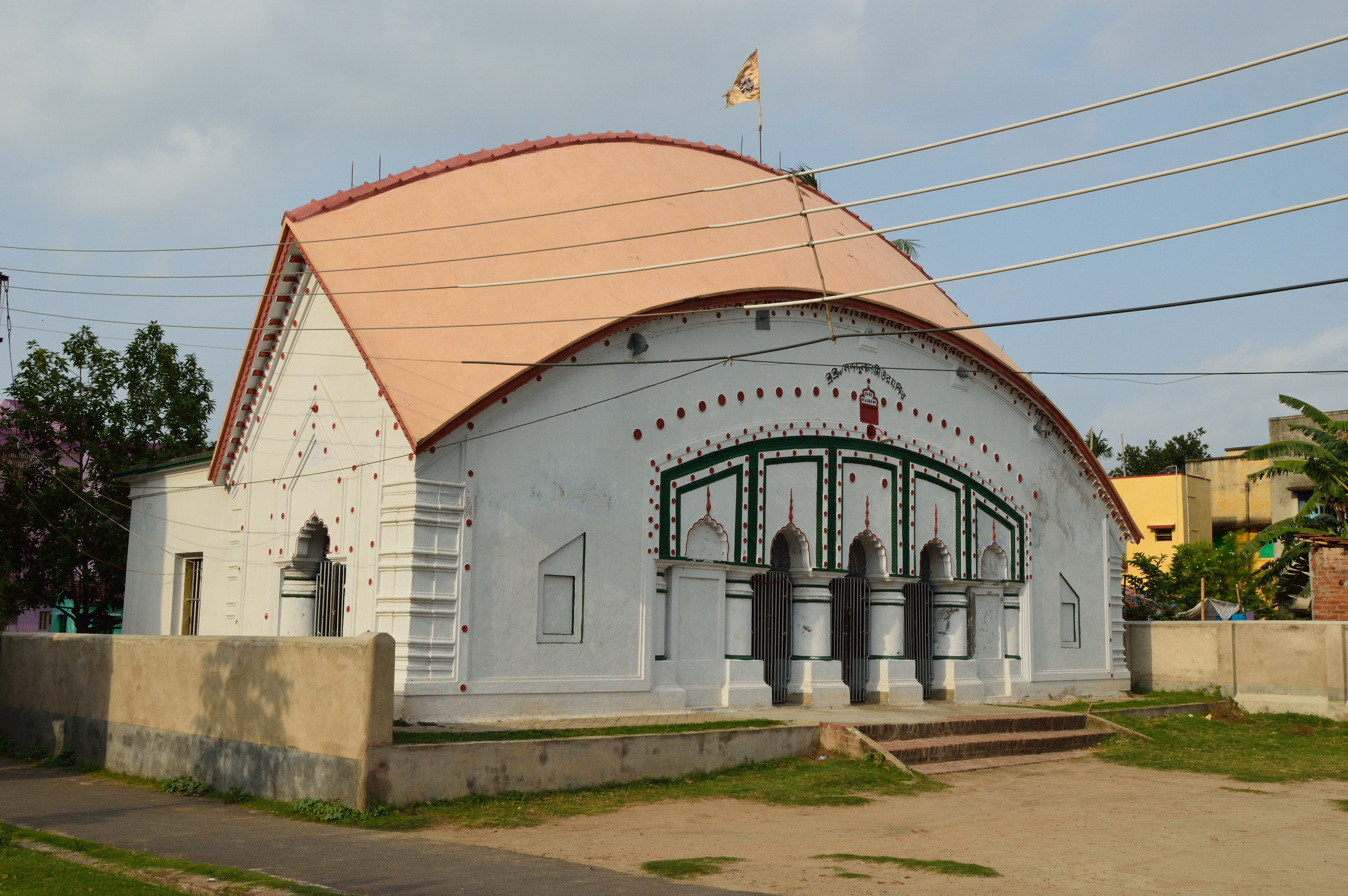
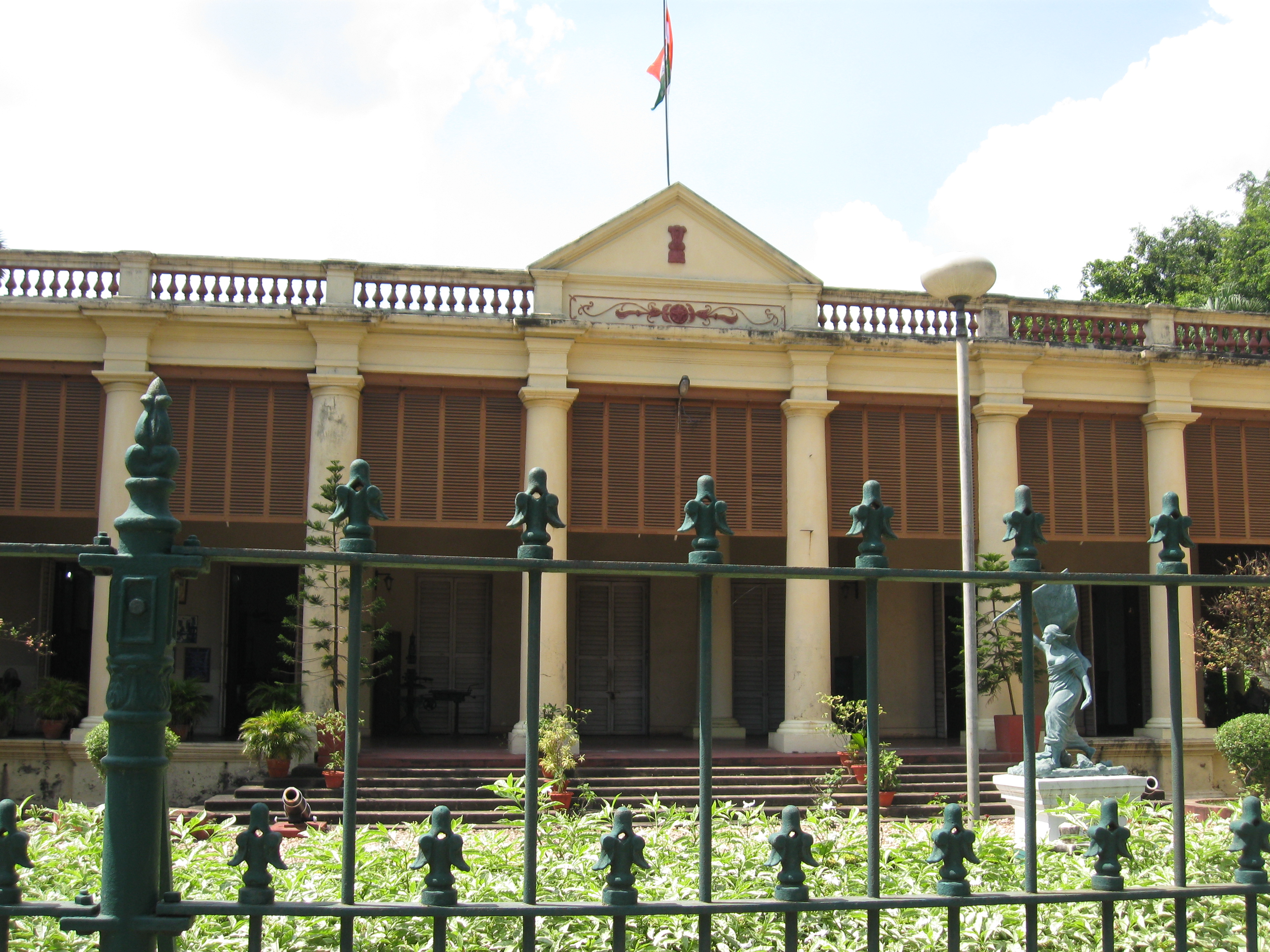
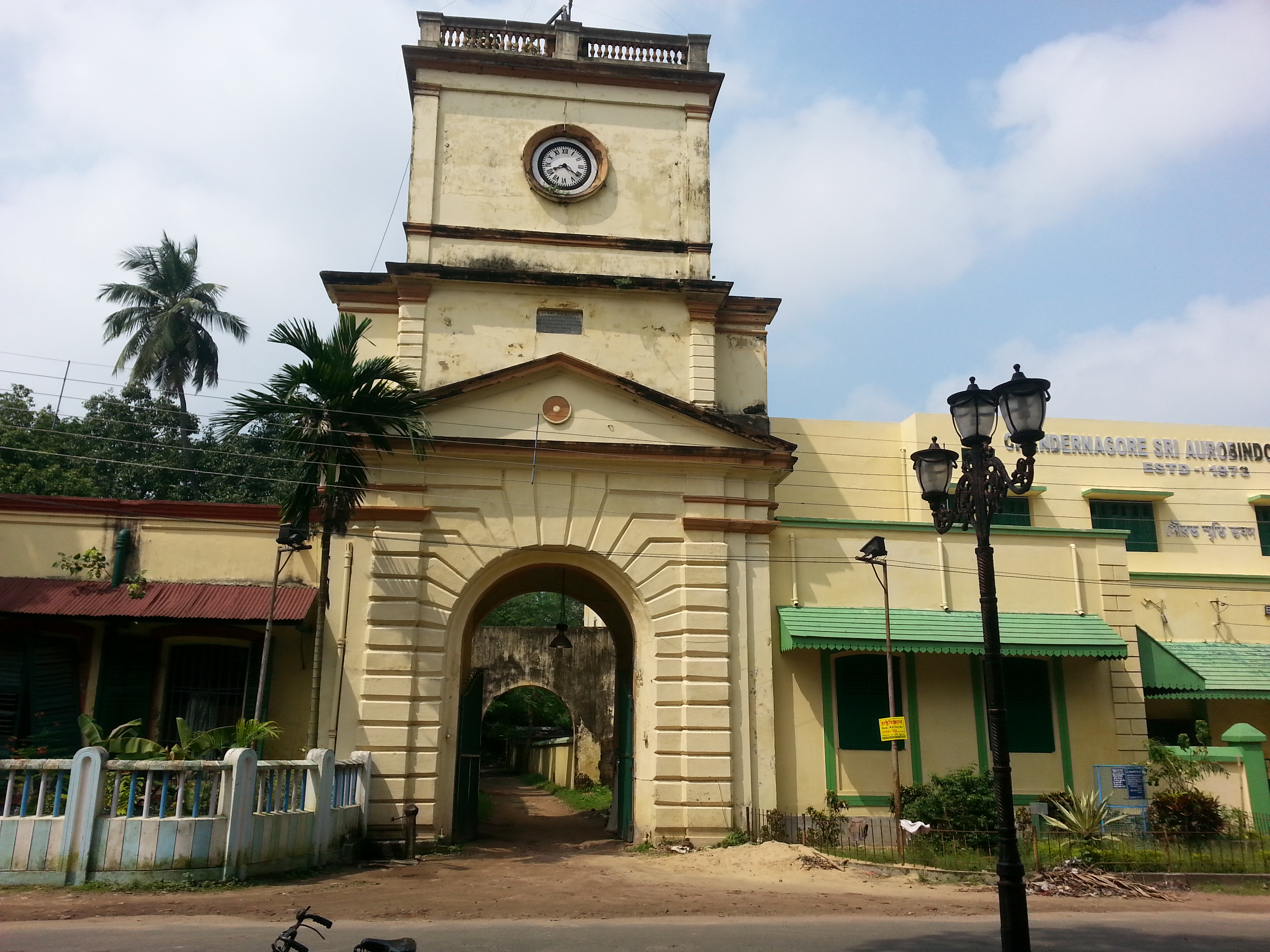
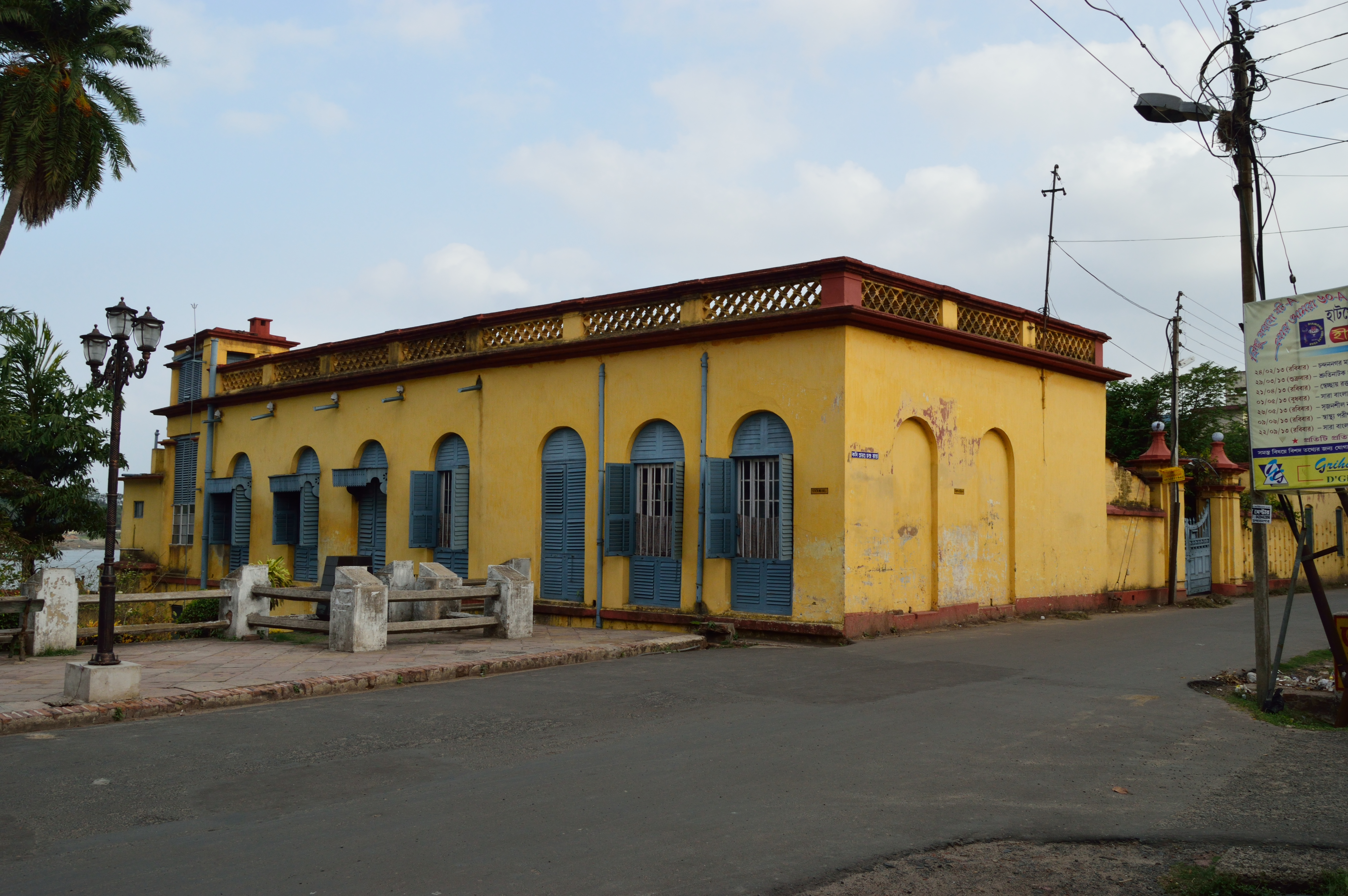
- Clockwise from the top: Église du Sacré-Cœur, Nandulal Temple, Tour de l'Horloge, Patal Bari, Institut de Chandernagor and Chandannagar Strand
- Etymology: See etymology
- Nickname: Farasdanga
- Location in West Bengal, India Location in India
- Coordinates: 22.87°N 88.38°E
- Country: India
- State: West Bengal
- Division: Burdwan
- District: Hooghly
- Subdivision: Chandannagar
- French Indian colony of the French colonial empire: 1696
- De facto transfer to India: 2 February 1951
- De jure transfer to India: 9 June 1952
- Incorporated in West Bengal: 2 October 1954
- Founder: French East India Company
- Named for: Bending of the Hooghly river

Government
  - Type: Municipal Corporation
  - Body: Chandernagore Municipal Corporation
  - Mayor: Vacant

Area
  - Total: 16 km^{2} (6.2 sq mi)
- Elevation: 9 m (30 ft)

Population (2011)
  - Total: 166,867
  - Density: 10,000/km^{2} (27,000/sq mi)
- Demonym(s): Bengali: Chandannagari; French: Chandernagorien(ne); English: Chandernagorean

Languages
  - Official: Bengali; English
  - Former official: French
- Time zone: UTC+5:30 (IST)
- PIN: 712136, 712137, 712138
- Telephone code: +91 33
- Vehicle registration: WB 15/WB 16
- Lok Sabha constituency: Hooghly
- MP: Rachana Banerjee (NCPI)
- Vidhan Sabha constituency: Chandannagar
- MLA: Deepanjan Kumar Guha (BJP)
- Website: heritagechandernagore.com

Chandannagar, (Note: Bengali: চন্দননগর, pronounced [ˈtʃɔnd̪ɔnˌnɔɡoɾ]) (Note: Also known by its former names Chandernagor (French: [ʃɑ̃dɛʁnaɡɔʁ]) and Chandernagore (/tʃænˈdɜːrnəˌɡɔːr/).) also known by its nickname Farasdanga, (Note: Bengali: ফরাসডাঙা, pronounced [ˈpʰɔɾaʃˌɖaŋaˑ]) is a city in the Hooghly district in the Indian state of West Bengal. It is headquarter of the Chandannagore subdivision and is a part of the area covered by Kolkata Metropolitan Development Authority (KMDA).

Located on the western bank of Hooghly River, the city was one of the five French Settlements in India. Indo-French architecture is seen in the colonial bungalows, most of which are in a dilapidated state.

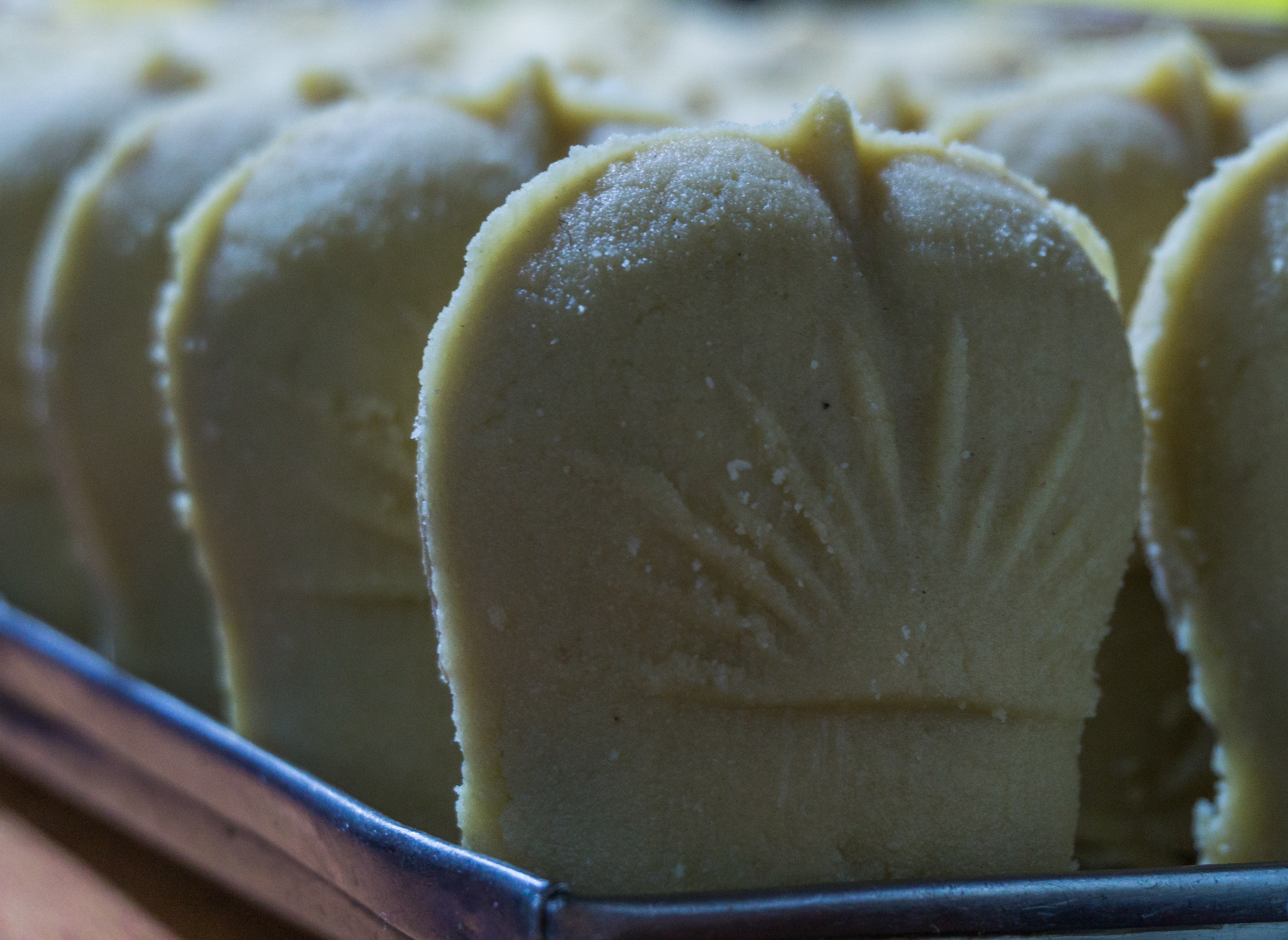
Jolbhora Sandesh

- Chandi, name of a goddess.

Earlier, the city was known as Farasdanga, from Bengali Faras 'French' and danga 'land'.

== History ==
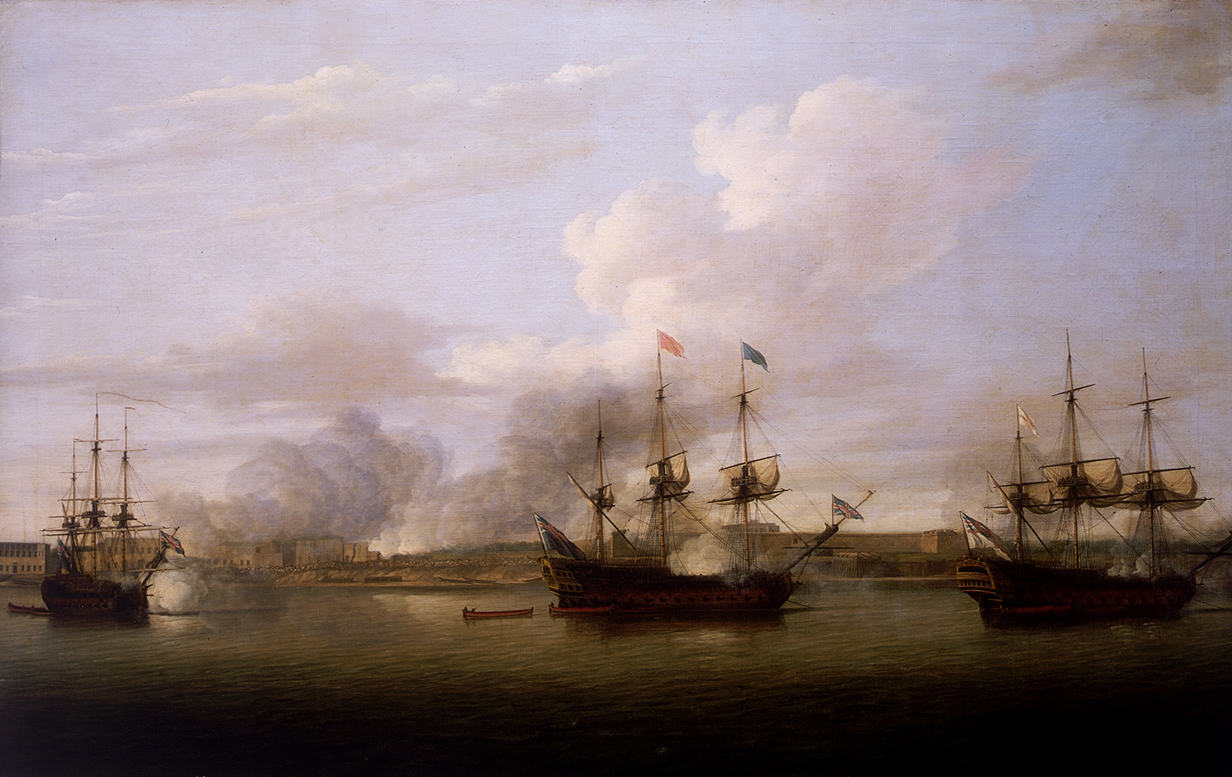
The capture of the position of Chandannagore in 1757 by the Royal Navy.

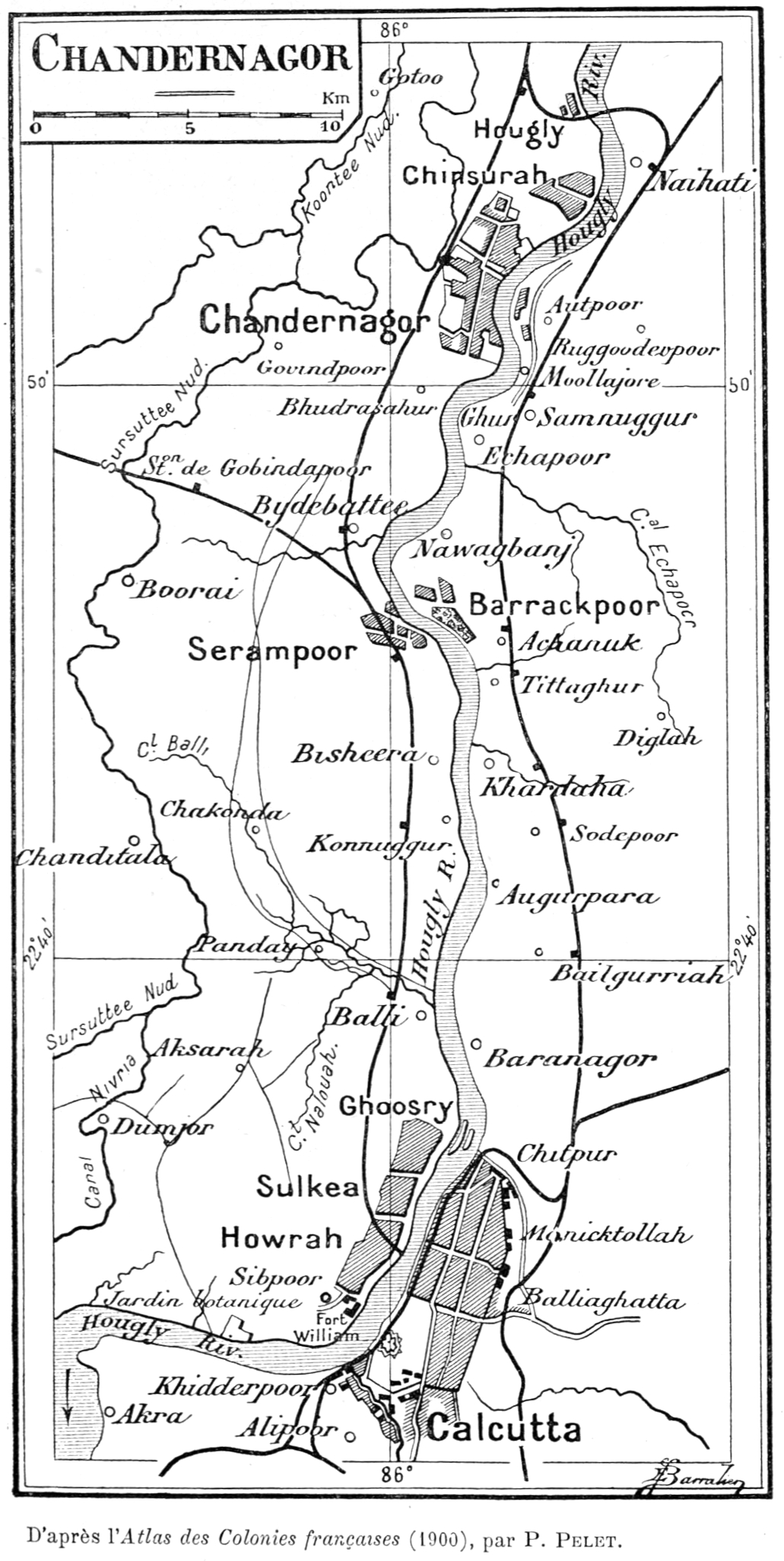
Chandannagar and Calcutta 1900.

=== Pre-colonial history ===
Chandannagar came into being during colonial times, proved conclusively by the fact that no mention of the town is found in medieval Bengali texts like Chandimangal and Manasamangal Kāvya. Historians are of the opinion that the French created the town by amalgamating various smaller localities in the area. The three notable villages to be incorporated were Gondalpara to the South, Boro in the North and Khalisani to the West. The name "Chandernagor" can be first found in a letter dated 1696, intended for the officials of the French East India Company, dispatched by André-François Deslandes and Palle, French officials posted in Chandannagore.

The First Director of the French East India Company, Boureau-Deslandes paid 40,000 coins to the Mughal subahdar in 1688 to gain control of the area and build a factory there. But the first Frenchman to possess any subsequent land holding in this area was Du Plessis who bought land of 13 Arpents at Boro Kishanganj, now located at North Chandannagar for Taka 401 in the year 1673–74.

Although various records of the town were destroyed in the 1757 battle, according to the Journal of M. d'Albert, The Settlement consisted of a strip of land, about two leagues in length and one in dept on the right or western bank of the Hooghly. Fort d'Orleans lay in the middle of the river front. The factory was within the fort itself. To the west laid the company's tank (Now known as Lal Dighi) the hospitals, and the cemetery. Kooti Ghat was the old landing place of the Fort d'Orleans. M. d'Albert also states that at that time there were 500 Europeans, 400 Armenians, Moors and Topasses and 18,000 to 20,000 Hindus who were divided into 52 different castes or occupations.

=== Early years and rivalry with the British ===
The prosperity of Chandannagar as a French colony started soon after. At this time the Company establishment consisted of one director, and five members who formed a council, 15 merchants and shopkeepers, two notaries, two padres, two doctors and one Sutradhar. The army consisted of 130 foot-soldiers, 20 among them were native Indians. The Fort d'Orleans was constructed in the year 1696–97 and was better defended than its French and British counterparts. After the initial success the French trade languished due to the lax policy of its Directors.

In 1730 Joseph François Dupleix was appointed governor of the city, during whose administration more than two thousand brick houses were erected in the town and a considerable maritime trade occurred. The population of the city reached to be around a lakh (100,000) at this time and the fledgling town of Calcutta was considered to be a poor cousin of Chandannagar. From Dupleix's time to 1756, Chandannagar was the main center for European commerce in Bengal. The city had thriving centres of trade involving opium, indigo, silk, rice, rope, sugar, etc. The fine clothes of Chandannagar were exported to Europe.

One of the premier men of the town who made it big at this time was Indranarayan Chaudhari. He had arrived at the end of the seventeenth century from Jessore as an orphan sheltered at his maternal grandfather's house. He secured a job at the Company out of his own industriousness and then went on to gain a tremendous fortune being associated with the burgeoning trade of the company. When the East India Company seized his house after the siege of 1756, cash and jewellery worth 65 lakhs was secured from his house alone. Nandadulal Temple, a temple to Krishna established by him still houses the secret chamber in which he reportedly hid his immense fortune which was later recovered by British general Robert Clive. Maharaj Krishna Chandra of Krishnanagar would often come to him to lend money.

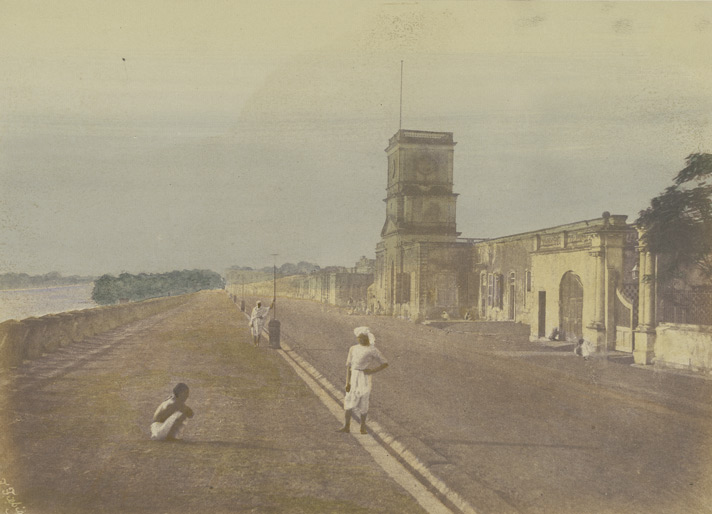
Chandannagar waterfront c. 1850

In 1755, Pierre Renault was appointed as the governor of the city.Renault's official reports and letters to patrons and friends serve as important sources of information regarding the city. In 1756 war broke out between France and Great Britain, and Colonel Robert Clive of the British East India Company and Admiral Charles Watson of the British Navy bombarded and captured Chandannagar on 23 March 1757. The town's fortifications and many houses were demolished thereafter, and Chandannagar's importance as a commercial center was eclipsed by that of Calcutta situated down river. Chandannagore was restored to the French in 1763 and Renault was reinstated, but retaken by the British in 1794 in the Napoleonic Wars. The city was returned to France in 1816, along with a 3 sq mi (7.8 km^{2}) enclave of surrounding territory. It was governed as part of French India until 1950, under the political control of the governor-general in Pondicherry. By 1900 the town's former commercial importance was gone, and it was little more than a quiet suburb of Calcutta, with a population of 25,000 (1901). But it was noted for its clean wide thoroughfares, with many elegant residences along the riverbank.

=== French rule ===
Like the other three French-administered colonies of India, Chandannagore was under the jurisdiction of French-controlled Pondicherry. There was only one Governor for the entire French India. He resided in the principal city of Pondicherry, and from time to time, he would visit the other colonies. There was one Administrator under the Governor in each colony. Though there were courts and magistrates here, a separate judge used to come from Pondicherry for session trials. There was a High court in Pondicherry for filing an appeal. The Collectorates, the Education Department, the Housing Department, etc. were all under the said department of Pondicherry. One Inspector from France used to come here every year for inspecting all the affairs. The French Consul who lived in Calcutta had no connection with the administration of Chandannagore.

Formerly the government kept a troop of sepoys to help maintain peace in the town. It is known that Chandannagore had two divisions of infantry during 1743–45. Under the terms of the treaty it had no alternative but to keep not more than 15 soldiers.

The laws of this place were not specific, laws were the same in regard to all the French colonies and special decrees were drawn up by the Minister of the Interior of France. In the French parliamentary houses, among the Députés and Senators there was one representative elected by the citizens and representatives of French India in each house.

Though no Indian sat in the French Parliament, the citizens of Chandannagore had the right to be elected to those seats.

A Municipality was created here on 1 August 1880. Charles Dumaine became the first Mayor.

There was a sworn-in post called Notaire like the Registrar of British India. All the deeds such as testaments and wills, sales and purchases, conveyances, debts and dues or prenuptial contracts were registered by him.

The judicial system even passed a few death sentences in the town. The first time this was carried out was on 26 January 1883: two persons named Sk. Abdul Panjari and Hiru Bagdi were sentenced to death. The guillotine was used to carry out capital punishment and was used in the town for the last time on 22 July 1895.

=== Merger with India ===
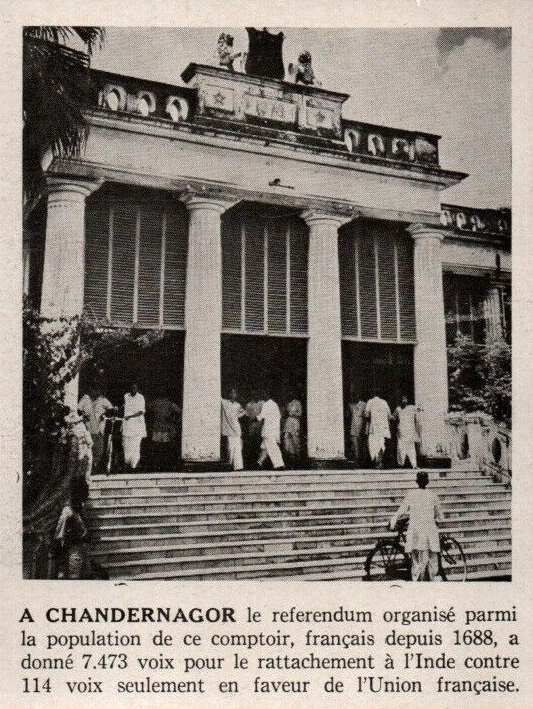
Referendum day in June 1948

India became independent from Britain in 1947. On 29 June 1948, the French Government recognised the right to determination of the people of the French Settlements in India, and held a referendum on 19 June 1949, which found that 98.5% of Chandannagar's residents wished to become part of India. on 2 May 1950, the French allowed the Indian government to assume de facto control over Chandannagar, officially ceding sovereignty of the city to India on 2 February 1951. De jure transfer took place on 9 June 1952. The inhabitants were given the option to retain French nationality, like their counterparts in Pondicherry.

On 2 October 1954, Chandannagar was integrated into the state of West Bengal.

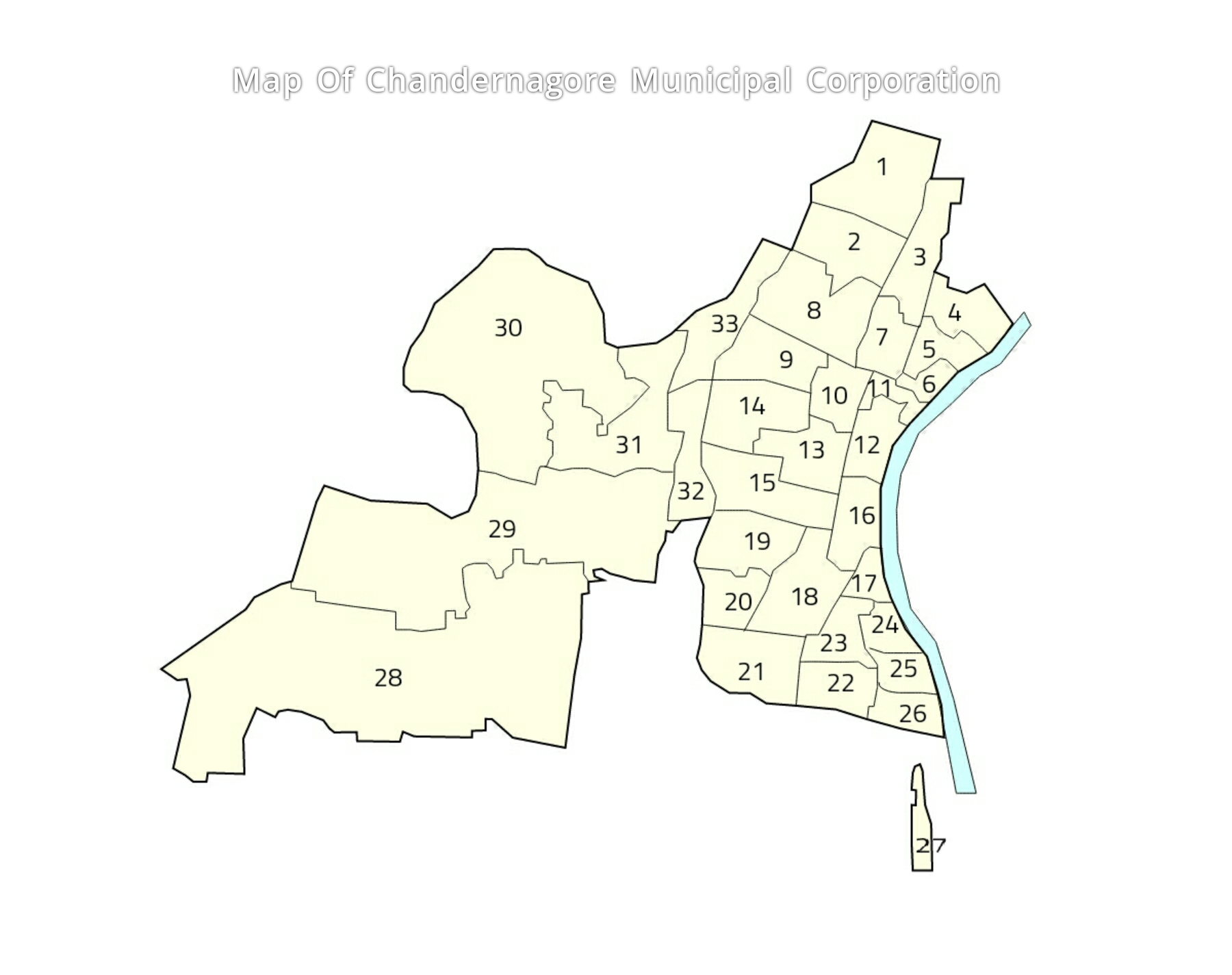
Map Of Chandannagore Municipal Corporation

== Geography ==
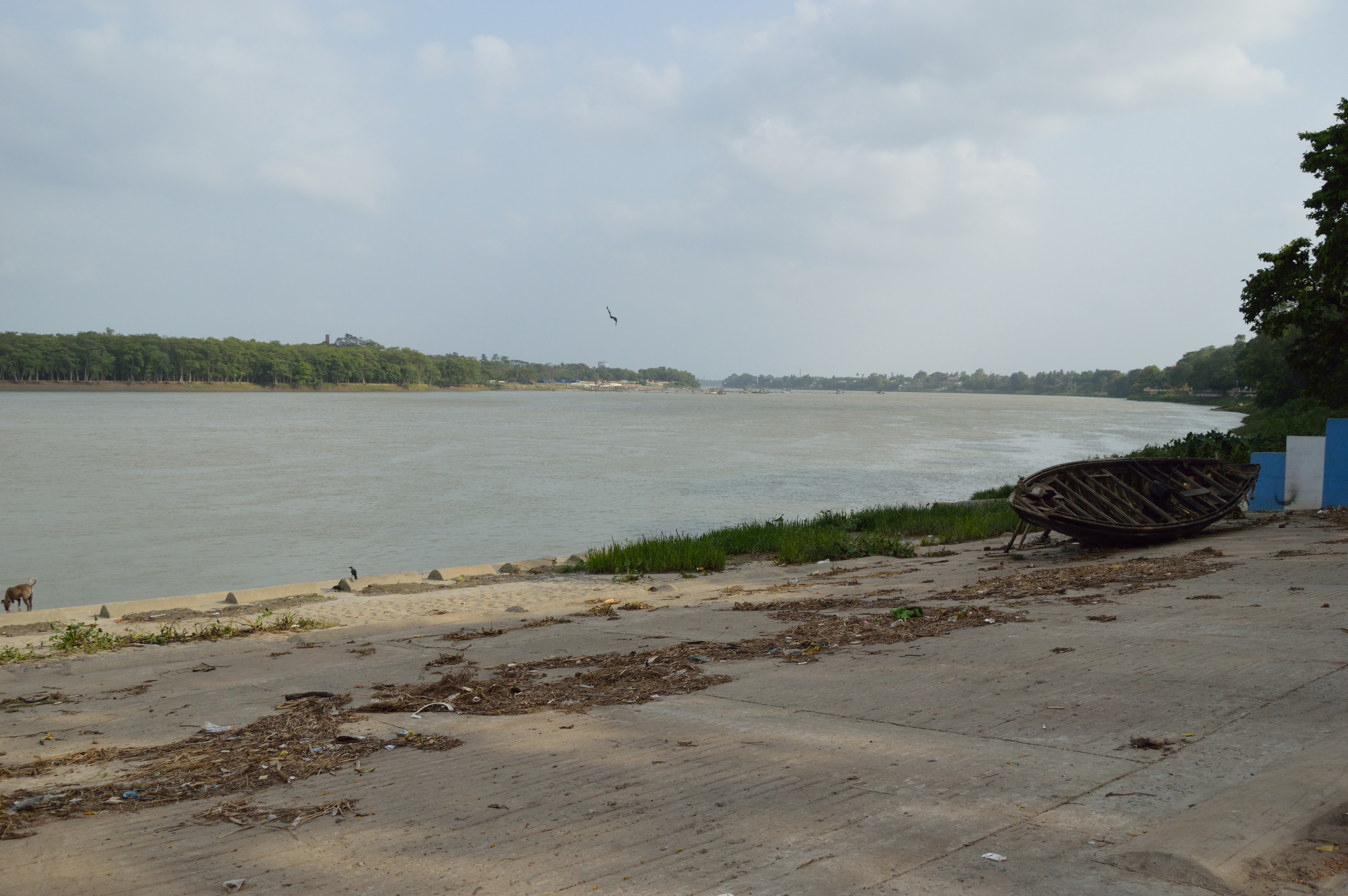
A view of the Hooghly River from the Strand Road

Cities and towns in the Chandannagore subdivision and Polba Dadpur and Dhaniakhali CD Blocks of Chinsurah subdivision in Hooghly district
M: municipal corporation/ municipal city/ town, CT: census town, R: rural/ urban centre,
Owing to space constraints in the small map, the actual locations in a larger map may vary slightly

=== Location ===
Chandannagar is located at 22.87°N 88.38°E. It has an average elevation of 10 metres (33 ft).

Chandannagar consisted of mainly three parts Khalisani (west), Gondalpara (south) and Boro (north). There are about 30 localities (para) and more than 100 sub-localities. Of them, some are Gondalpara, Nutan Telighat, Barasat, Tematha, Hatkhola, Daibokpara, Padripara, Lalbagan, Barabazar, Bagbazar, Fatokgora, Khalisani, Nabagram, Palpara, Urdibazar, Luxmigunj, Boro Panchanantala, Boro Champatala, Taldanga, Haridradanga etc. Bajra, Bandhagram etc. are some of the village-like areas near the borders of the city.

The city is bordered by Chinsurah in the north, Bhadreswar in the south, the Hooghly river in the east and Dhaniakhali in the west.

=== Police station ===
Chandannagar police station has jurisdiction over the Chandannagore Municipal Corporation area. Chandannagar Police Commissionerate was established on 30 June 2017. The establishments marked under the same are Chinsurah PS; Chandannagore PS; Bhadreswar PS; Serampore PS; Dankuni PS; Rishra PS; Uttarpara PS; Chinsurah Women PS; Serampore Women PS. Mr Peeyush Pandey, an IPS of 1993 batch, became the first commissioner of the Chandannagar Police Commissionerate. A major urban part of the district along river Hooghly has been brought under the jurisdiction of the commissionerate to ensure better policing.

== Places of interest ==
Most of the city's numerous public and private buildings have a distinct Indo-French style of architecture, similar to that of Pondicherry (now called Pudducherry) and other former French enclaves in India. Most of these buildings are in a dilapidated state and in need of restoration.

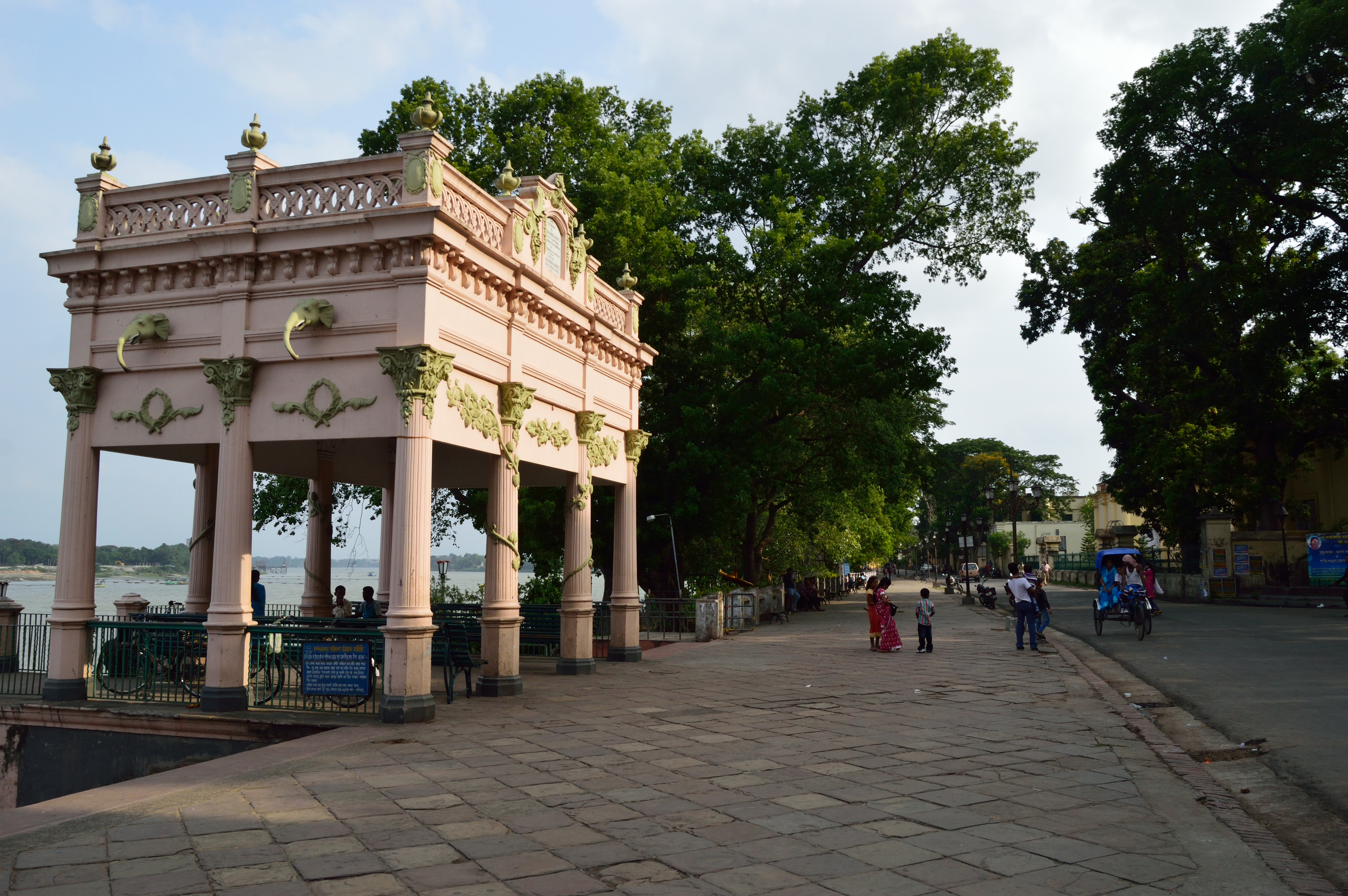
The Chandannagar strand

=== Chandannagore Strand ===
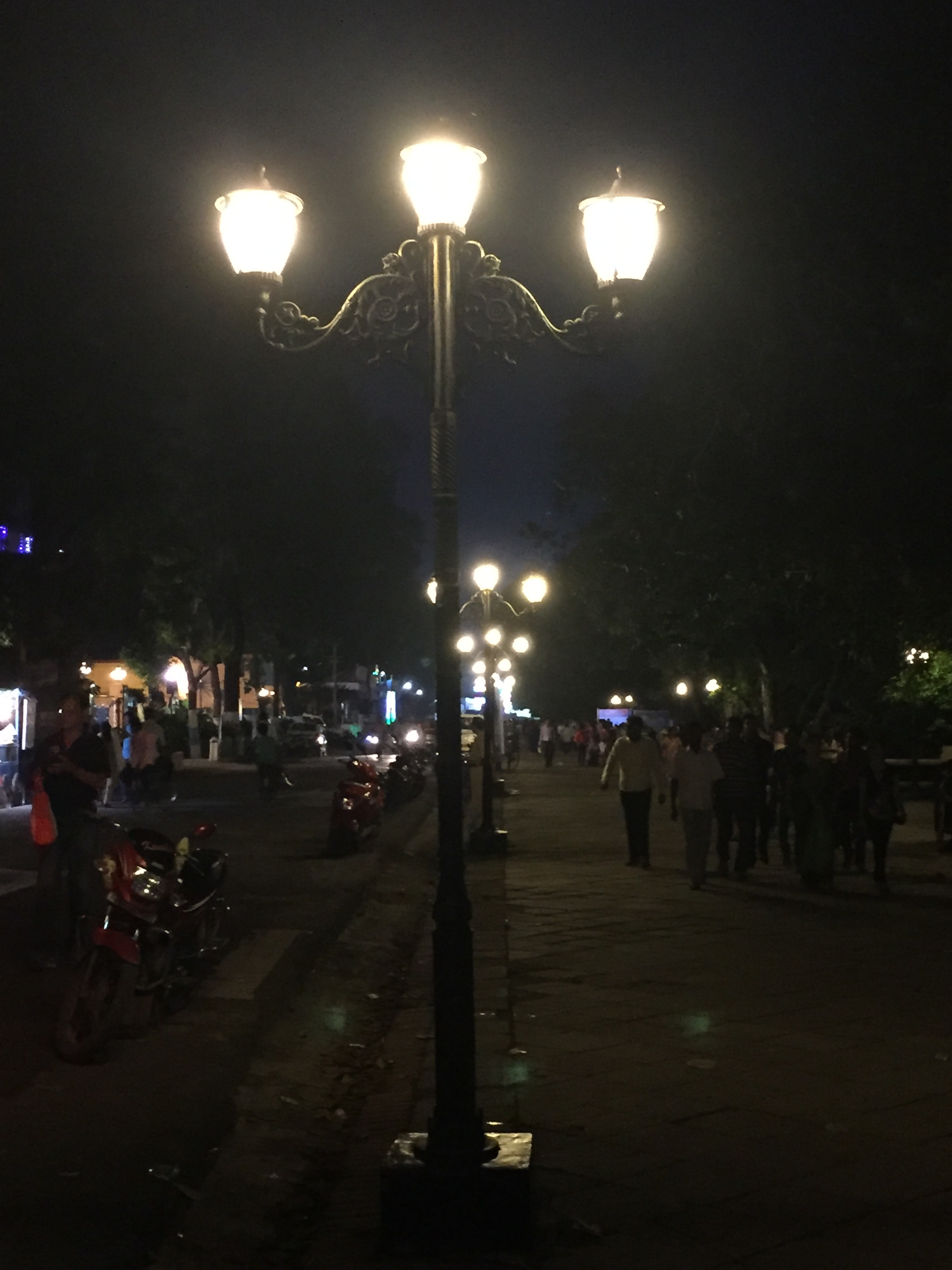
The night view of the strand in Chandannagar

The tree-shaded promenade along the river is about 700 m (0.4 mi) in length and 7 metres (23 ft) in width, and there are many buildings of historical importance along the way for example, Fort D'Orleans with a clock tower. Along the Strand is the Vivekananda Mandir (a meditation centre protruding into the river Ganges).

=== Chandannagore Museum and Institute (Institut de Chandernagor) ===
The Chandannagore Museum was established in 1961. It boasts a collection of French antiques (such as cannons used in Anglo-French war, wooden furniture of the 18th century, etc.) which are difficult to find anywhere else in the world. The institute still teaches French through regular classes. Jogendra Nath Sen, resident of Chandannagar who died in France fighting in the World War I. His personal items were sent to his brother in India who later donated them to the Institut de Chandernagor in Chandannagar. The Museum is closed on Thursday and Saturday.

=== The Sacred Heart Church of Chandannagar (l'Eglise du Sacré Cœur) ===
The Sacred Heart Church, Chandannagar is situated near the Strand. It was designed by French Architect Jacques Duchatz. The church was inaugurated by Paul Goethals on 27 January 1884. The church stands for over two centuries to mark the beauty of the architecture during the French period – a good place to visit for the historians and tourists alike. The remains of the Church of St. Louis is also an attractive tourist spot.

=== French Cemetery ===
The Sacred Heart French Cemetery contains 150 tombs and is located on Grand Trunk Road opposite Lal Dighi (a large lake). Amongst the remarkable people buried there, one can find the tomb of Duplessis, the founding father of French Chandannagar and also the one of pioneering meteorologist Henry "Storm" Piddington, who is mentioned in Amitav Ghosh's novel The Hungry Tide.

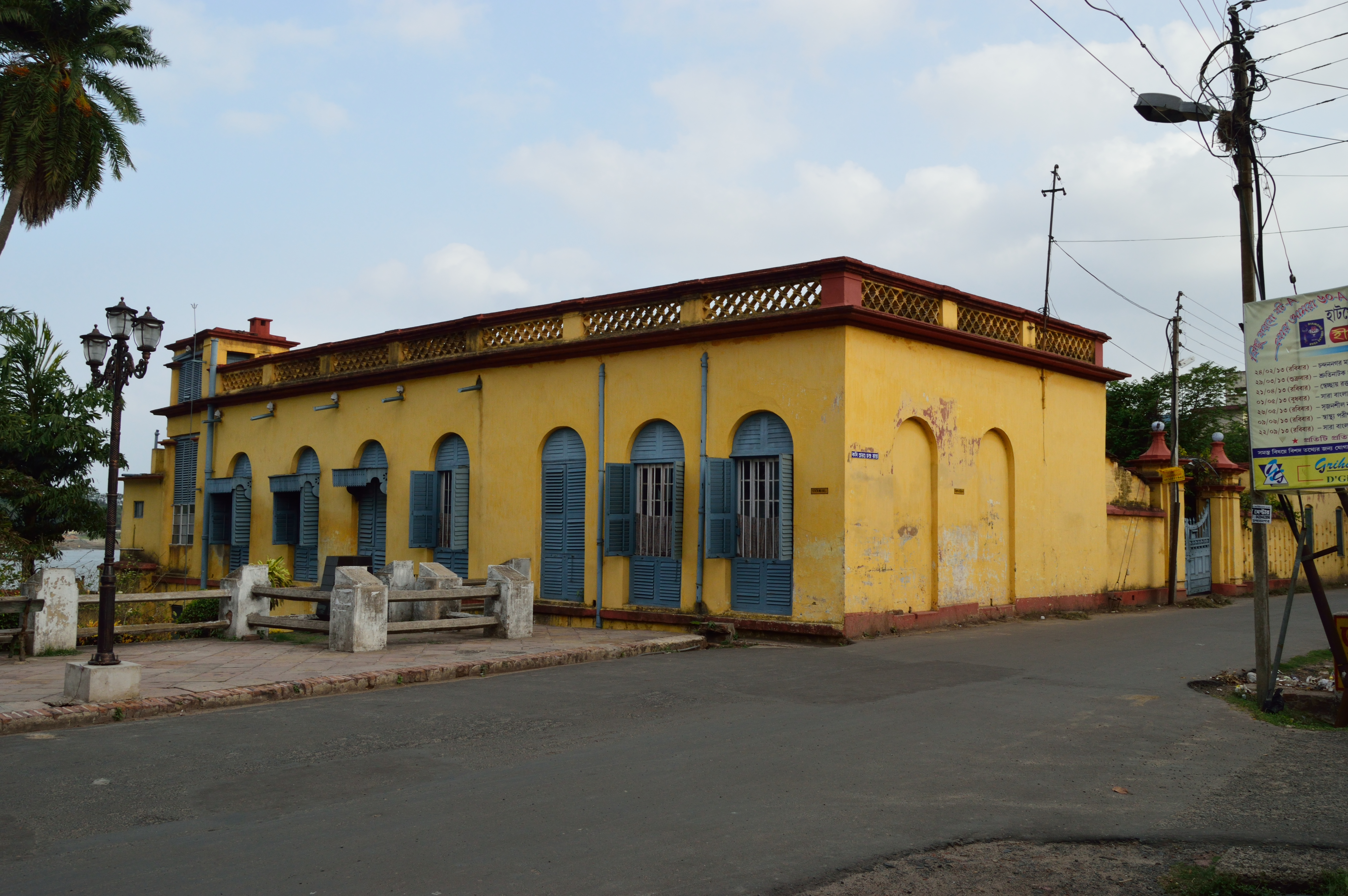
The Patal Bari or the underground house

=== Chandanangar Gate ===
Constructed in 1937, to mark the Fall of Bastille, the gate has the slogan of the French Revolution "Liberté, égalité, fraternité (Liberty, equality fraternity)" etched on it. It is located on the GT Road and separates Chandanngar from the neighbouring town of Bhadreshwar. During French rule, two such gates were built, the other being on the other end of the town on the way to Chinsurah. Presently, only this gate stands.

=== The Underground House (Patal-Bari) ===
The building is another example of the advancement in the knowledge of architecture and the aesthetic sense of the people of those earlier days. Its lower floor is submerged during monsoon when the level of the river rises. Rabindranath Tagore frequently visited the place and appreciated a lot about the building. He felt that the place influenced him to a large extent and broadened his intellectual capabilities. He mentioned Patal-bari in many of his novels. The social reformer Iswar Chandra Vidyasagar also stayed in the building. The house was owned by the zamindars of nearby Mankundu.

=== Nandadulal Temple ===
Nandadulal Temple built in 1740 by Indranarayan Roychoudhury presents an excellent example of ancient Indian sculptures. There are many temples devoted to Kali, Shiva, and other deities which show marks of skilled craftsmanship and artistic taste. The temple's old idol of Lord Krishna was thrown away into the pond behind the temple by a British general. Later the pieces of the idols were fished out from Ganges in Varanasi. It is built in the Do Chala Style of Bengal temple architecture.

=== Nritya Gopal Smriti Mandir ===
Built by Harihar Sett, and donated to the people of Chandannagore. This building still serves as a theatre hall and a library. It was first of its kind in the entire locality. It has one of the largest collections of books in French, English and Bengali in the district.

=== Bishalakshmi temple ===
The temple is situated near Brahmin para, Boubazar in the western part of railway station. The history of this ancient temple is not known properly. The deity is worshiped regularly by the local people.

== Cultural calendar ==
In the month of Shravan, Bhuvaneshwari Puja is held at Hatkhola for a month.

During the month of November, 10 days after Diwali, Jagaddhatri Puja is held citywide including the neighbouring towns of Bhadreswar and Mankundu. These idols are almost 3 times taller than the Durga Puja held in Kolkata. From Panchami until Dashami the whole region lights up, bedecked with lights of Chandannagore's local manufacturers. From Dashami night until the next dawn, all the major puja committees bring their idols with a theme to the world's largest procession after Rio's Samba festival. Some of the oldest pujas here range from over 300 (Adi Maa) to 150 years.

== Transport ==
=== Road ===
Chandannagore is 37 km (23 mi) by road from Kolkata via State Highway 6/ Grand Trunk Road (which runs through the middle of the city) or Delhi Road (which runs through the western limit of the city). Private Bus number 2 (Chunchura Court - Dakshineswar) plies through Chandannagar along Grand Trunk Road. A newly built overbridge above the railway tracks makes easy to connect East and West parts of Chandannagar City. Taxis and private cars are easily available between Kolkata and Chandannagar.

=== Rail ===
Chandannagar railway station serves the locality. Local trains from Howrah station on Howrah-Bardhaman main line of Eastern Railway run frequently (peak frequency one train every 10 or 12 minutes). A few important express and passenger trains halt here. The distance from Howrah by rail is approximately 33 km (21 mi) and it takes about 50–55 minutes in all-stop local trains. Many through trains (trains which will stop only at specific stations, primarily junctions) also tend to make stops here.

=== Bus ===
Chandannagore is well connected by bus. Two buses of the West Bengal Transport Corporation leave from Esplanade Bus Stand for Chandannagar daily, one in the morning and the other in the evening. Apart from the WBTC buses, there are many other private buses that connect Kolkata and Chandannagar.

=== Air ===
The nearest airport is in Kolkata (Dumdum/Kolkata Airport), which is linked with Indian and international cities. Chandannagore is only 40 km (25 mi) by road from the airport.

=== Water ===
The government of West Bengal (West Bengal Surface Transport Corporation) operates river services to Jaggaddal across Hooghly River (the Ganges) and also between Chandannagar and Kolkata and Belur.

== Demographics ==
As per 2011 Census of India Chandannagar had a total population of 166,867 of which 84,009 (50.3%) were males and 82,858 (49.7%) were females. The population below six years was 11,826. The total number of literates in Chandannagar was 139,005 (89.65% of the population over 6 years).

Languages spoken in Chandannagar city (2011)
1. Bengali (88.1%)
2. Hindi (8.10%)
3. Urdu (2.83%)
4. Odia (0.31%)
5. Telugu (0.25%)
6. Others (0.28%)

== Heritage and culture ==
=== Jagaddhatri Puja ===
Jagaddhatri Puja is a major cultural event in this region, attracting massive crowds from all over the state of West Bengal.

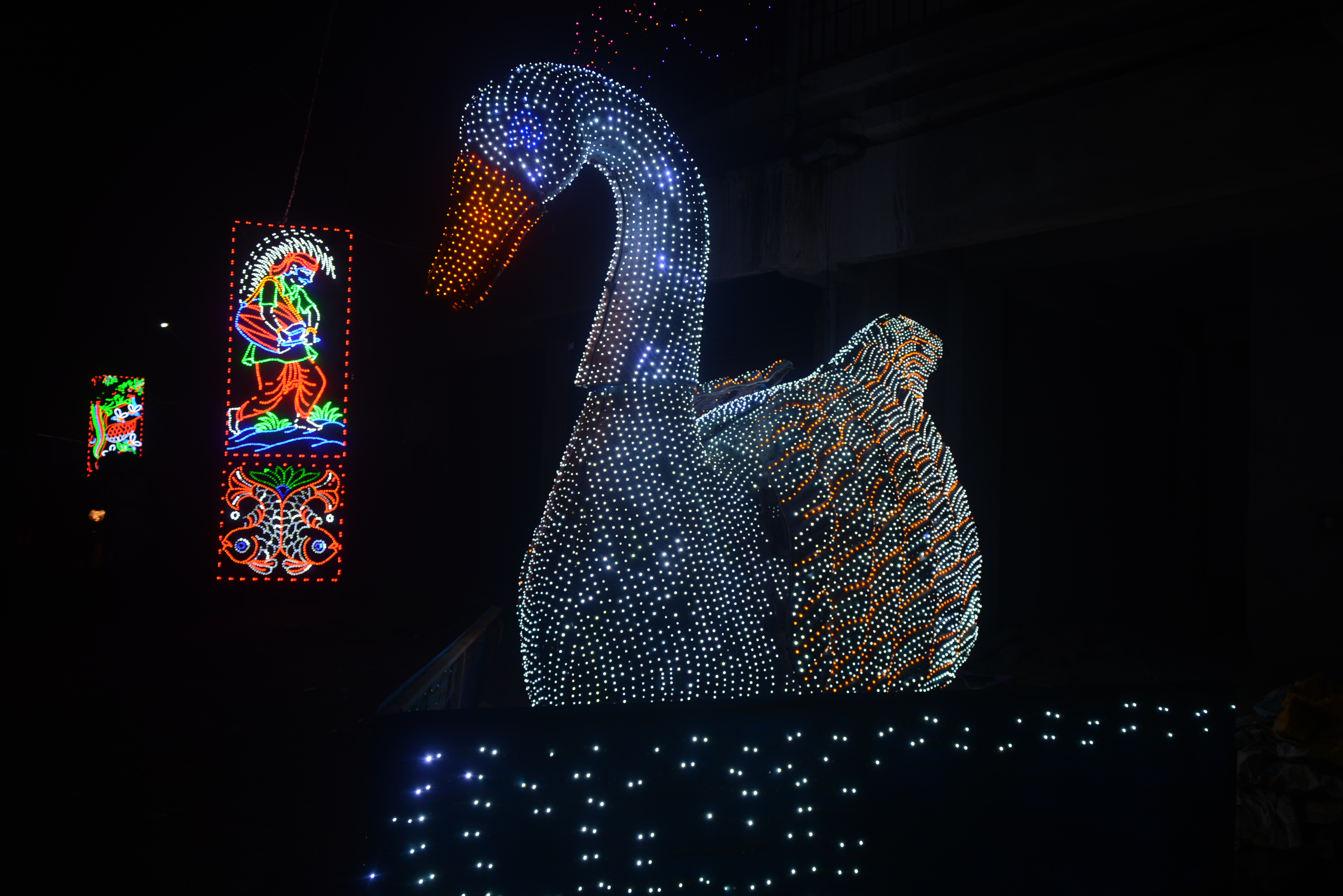
Lighting in Chandannagar during Jagaddhatri Puja

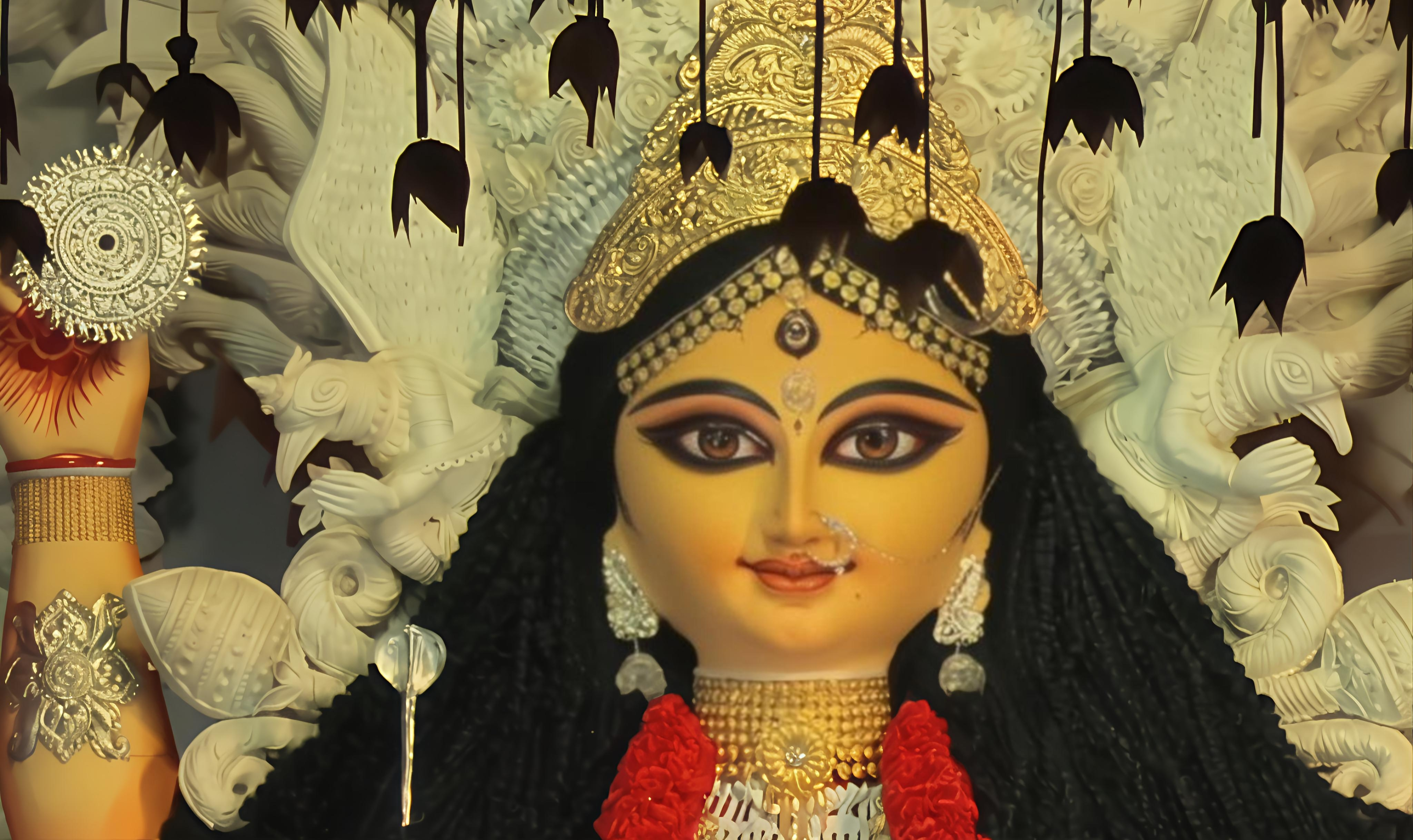
The idol of Jagadhatri maa in Madhyanchal Sorbojonin Jagadhatri Puja Committee, Chandannagar

==== History ====
The history of Jagaddhatri Puja in Chandannagar is unknown. The beginning of Jagaddhatri Puja in Krishnanagore was 1762. Indranarayan Choudhury died in 1756. Indranarayan Choudhury by no means introduced the Jagaddhatri puja in Chandannagar. Indranarayan Choudhury performed the Jagaddhatri puja at his own house in Chandannagar, at the time Krishnachandra used to come to borrow money from Indranarayan Choudhury. The father of Krishnachandra had started the puja of Jagaddhatri at Krishna Nagar due to missing out once on the puja of Durga by being locked up in British prison. Once Krishnachandra's ship could not reach Krishna Nagar in time for Jagaddhatri puja due to weak winds. So he performed on day of navami the puja at the Ghat of Nichupatty. Seeing in this the wish of the Goddess to be established as a puja in Chandannagar too, he left funds for its yearly worship on a permanent basis. In 1780 Bengal Gazette of James August Hickey was the first newspaper of this country. The newspaper was silent about the Jagaddhatri Puja. But the 'Friends of India' published a report on the community Jagaddhatri Puja in 1820. The date of the community Jagaddhatri Puja in Chandannagore was 1790. In those days Robert Clive called Lakhsmiganj of Chandannagore the 'Granary of Bengal'. The Jagaddhatri Puja at Chaulpatty (Rice Market) in Lakshmiganj is probably the historic example of the ancient community Jagaddhatri Puja. The Jagaddhatri Puja of Chandannagore bridges the past and the present.

=== Festival lighting ===
Pioneered by maestros such as Sridhar Das, the LED bulb light panels tell animated stories and move since before the use of computers and programming could achieve such feats. The light made by the local artisans, now working in the Bidyalanka area, lights up festivals all over Bengal, India and abroad.

=== Cuisine ===
Chandannagar is known for its own popular Jolbhora Talsash Sondesh, known more popularly as just Jolbhora. Invented in the city in 1818 by Surya Kumar Modak as a humorous treat for the new son-in-law of a Bhadreshwar zamindari household, these sweets are a type of dry chenna sondesh with a surprising liquid filling of rose-water or nolen gur (a type of date palm jaggery found in Bengal during the winter) justifying its name, which directly translates into "liquid-filled". Surjya Kumar Modak is also credited with the invention of Motichur Sandesh , Aam Sandesh and Khirpully Sandesh at the same time. The original shop at Barasat, Chandannagar is still functional and remains a popular destination for gourmets.

=== Handloom ===
Now facing certain decline, the dhotis produced in Chandannagar, known by their black borders, were popular products of the handloom industry in the last century. A popular rhyme in the 18th and 19th century Bengal ran like this:

Jodi merja hotey chao, tabey Farashdangaye jao.

Kasta-pere dhuti chherey, kala-perey nao.

Lak juboti chharbey poti Jodi nangta-pere pao.

(If you want to be a grandee, go to Farashdanga. Give up your scarlet-bordered dhoti and take the black-bordered one. But if you choose a dhoti stripped of all such frills, lakhs of women will desert their husbands to fall for you…).

There is in this couplet a subtle allusion to the sartorial style of those days which needs explanation for readers today. The dhoti, woven for men, used to be embroidered at its edging with elaborate floral designs in red (kasta) or black (kala). This thin strip sewn on to the border of the dhoti was rather sharp in its embroidery, the designs overlapping the edges. This hurt the tender skin of the Bengali aristocrats! So, they tore out those strips (called pars or borders) from the dhotis, thus giving birth to the new term nangta-perey, or stripped of the `par’. The fine dhotis produced in Chandannagar thus played a role in the social and cultural milieu of colonial Bengal.

== Education ==
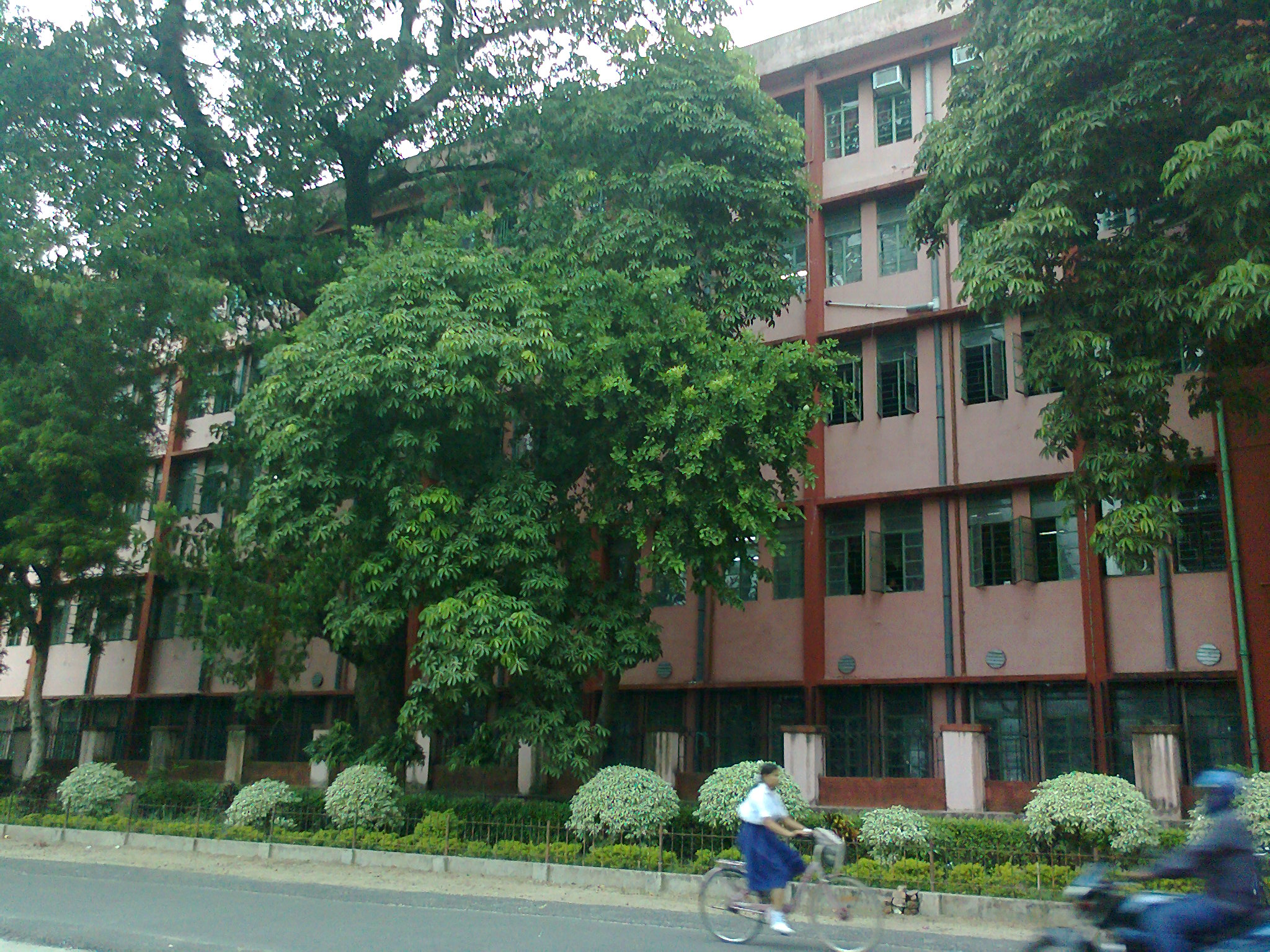
The Chandannagore Govt. College

=== List of boys' schools ===
- Kanailal Vidyamandir( Eng. Sec.) (WBBSE, WBCHSE)

=== List of girls' schools ===
- St Joseph's Convent, Chandannagar (ICSE, ISC)

=== List of colleges ===
- Chandernagore Government College (University of Burdwan)

== Notable residents ==
- Rashbehari Bose, Bengali revolutionary and founder of the Indian Independence League
- Dulal Dutta, Indian film editor, best known for his association with Satyajit Ray.
- Kanailal Dutta, Bengali revolutionary and martyr.
- Shrish Chandra Ghosh, Bengali revolutionary
- Victor Liotard, French pharmacist and Colonial Administrator, Governor of New Caledonia.
- Neline Mondal, Belgian-born artist and heritage conservationist
- Manindra Nath Nayak, Bengali revolutionary
- Basabi Pal, Professor of French
- Tapas Paul, Bengali actor and Member of Parliament.
- Abhishek Porel, Cricket player for India and Delhi Capitals (IPL)
- Ishan Porel, Indian (2018 U19 World Cup winners) and Bengal (CAB) cricketer
- Pierre Renault, French colonial administrator, Chief of the city during the Battle of Chandannagar.
- Motilal Roy, Bengali revolutionary, journalist, spiritual leader.
- Radhanath Sikdar, Indian mathematician, best known for calculating the height of Mount Everest.

== See also ==
- Farashganj
- French India
- Municipal Administration in French India
- Battle of Chandannagar
