= Pierre Renault =

French Colonial Administrator

Pierre Mathieu Renault de Saint-Germain (b. 1697 - d. 1777) was a French Colonial Administrator who was the in charge of the city of Chandannagar in French India for two terms, from April 1755 - 23 March 1757 and from 1765 - 1766 along with being the head of Karaikal during the Siege of 1760. He was the Chief of Chandannagar when it was invaded by the British in 1757.His official reports of the battle along with his letters to Joseph François Dupleix and other patrons serve as an important source of the battle and the city's history prior to that.

== Personal life ==
He was born in Châtellerault, France in 1697..He was married to Claire Splanger, with whom he had a son Joseph Pierre Xavier Renault de Saint Germain(1733-1819), who died in Port Louis. One of his descendants, Thomas Renault de Saint-Germain, was the Governor of Senegal from 1831 till his death in 1833.

He died in Chandannagar in 1777. He is buried at the old church of St Louis at Chandannagar, however his tombstone no longer exists.

== Career ==
He arrived in Pondicherry in 1723 as an official of the French Indies Company. He became an advisor to the Sovereign Council of Pondicherry and latter was transferred to Chandannagar in 1755.

In the prelude of the Battle of Plassey, Chandannagar had become a threat to the British due to its proximity to Calcutta. Reportedly, Renault received very little help from Pondicherry prior to the war, as a result of which the British won the battle.Renault was given protection by the Robert Clive after the battle, however his importance as the chief of the city was marginalized.

After his defeat at Chandernagore, he was made incharge of the French colony of Karaikal. On 5th April 1760, he surrendered to an overwhelming British force who seized the city. After this defeat, he was brought before a court martial and cashiered. Thomas Arthur, comte de Lally, reportedly said that Renault "deserved death" for failing to protect Karaikal.
