= Battle of Chandannagar =

1757 battle of the Third Carnatic War and Seven Years' War

- Part of the Third Carnatic War and Seven Years' War
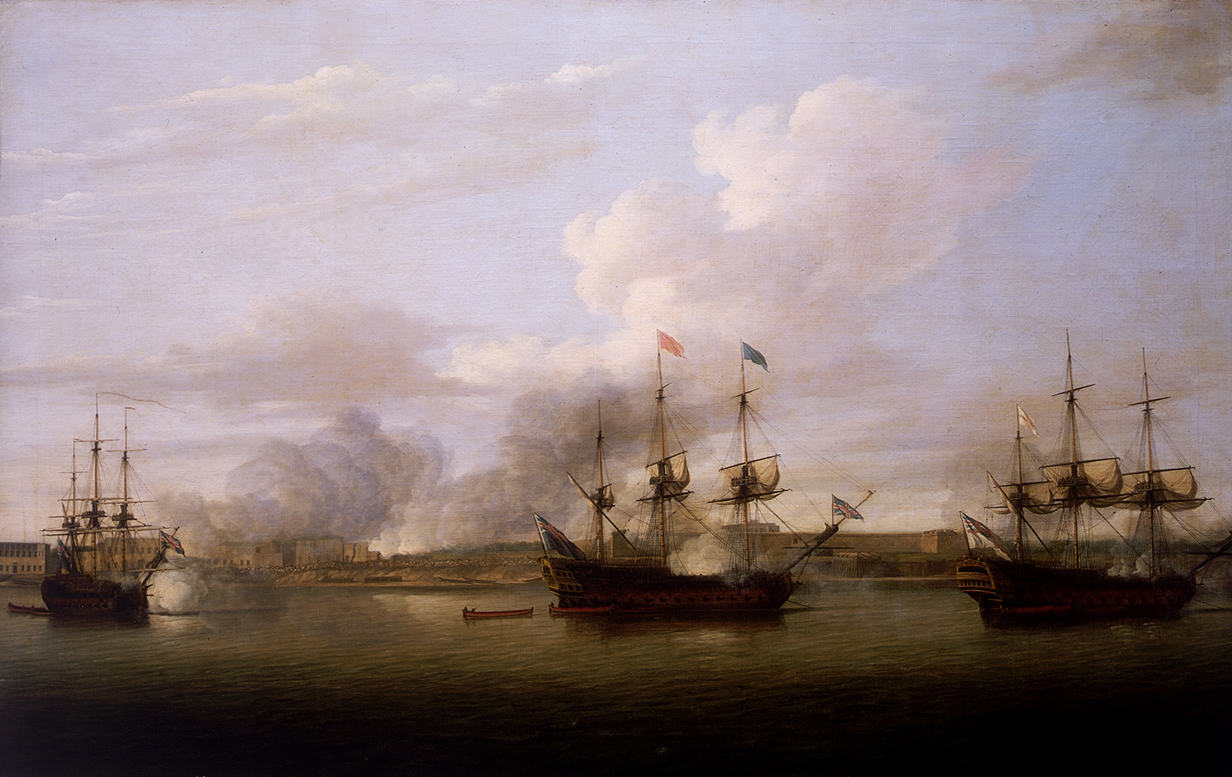
- The Capture of Chandernagore, March 1757; Dominic Serres, 1771
| Date | 23 March 1757 |
| Location | Chandernagore, Bengal Subah 22.8559°N 88.3800°E |
| Result | British victory |

Belligerents
| Great Britain; East India Company | French Indies Company |

Commanders and leaders
| Robert Clive; Charles Watson | Pierre Renault |

Strength
| 3 ships of the line | 1 fort |

Casualties and losses
| 37+ killed 74+ wounded | 1 fort captured 40+ killed 70 wounded |
- Location within West Bengal Chandannagar (India)

The Battle of Chandannagar was a successful attack on the French Indies Company settlement of Chandernagore by a British force under the command of Robert Clive and Charles Watson on 23 March 1757 during the Seven Years' War and the Third Carnatic war. Chandernagore remained under military occupation by the British until the signing of the Treaty of Paris in 1763, which brought an end to the war.

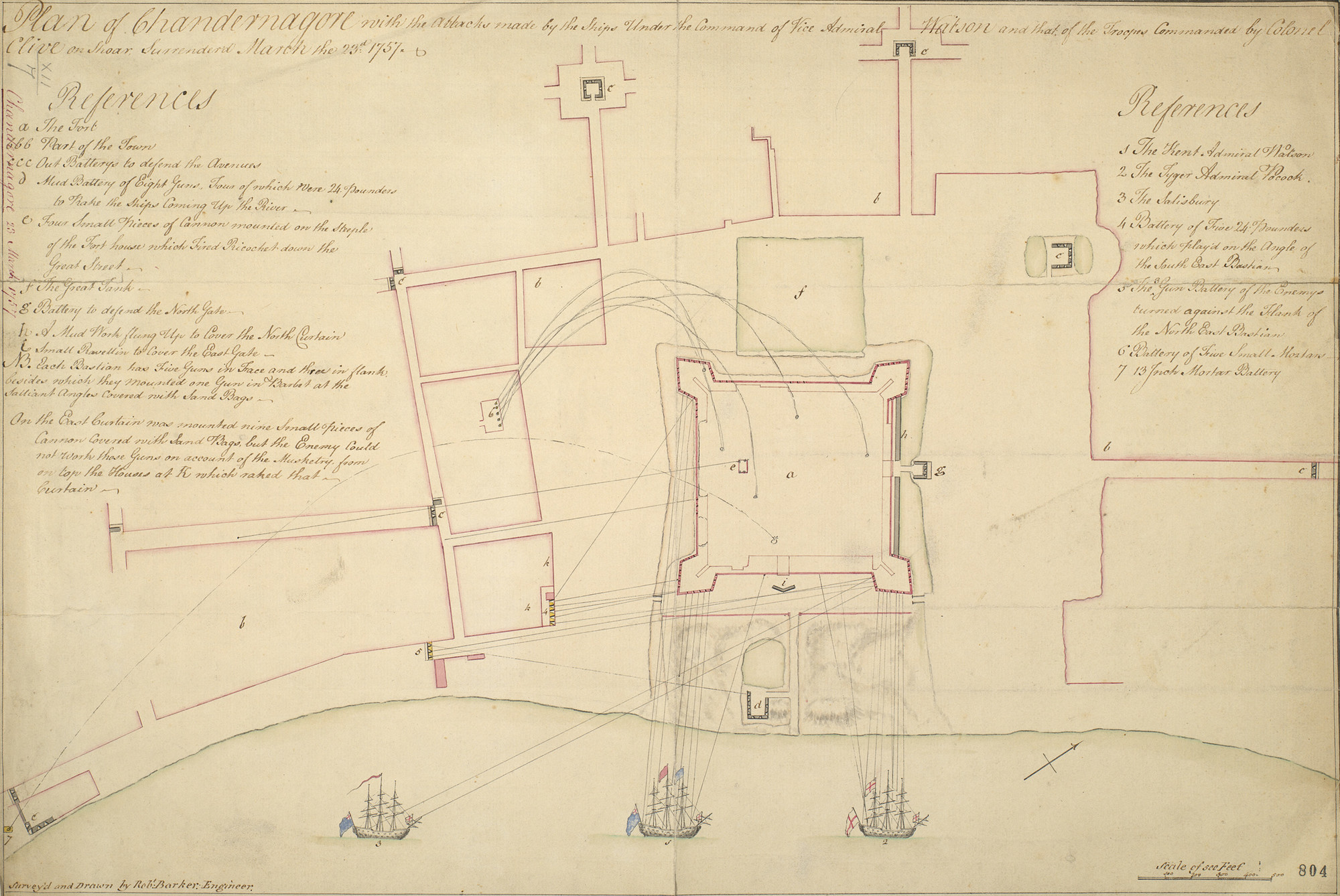
A plan of the battle

== Background ==
Lying ten miles up the Hooghly River from Calcutta, Chandernagore was the administrative centre of the French Indies Company. British East India Company officer Robert Clive, "determined to eliminate" the Nawab of Bengal, decided to capture Chandernagore as a preliminary step. The French fortifications at Chandernagore was equipped with only sixteen artillery pieces compared to the force Clive led to attack Chandernagore, which included three Royal Navy ships of the line, the Kent, Tiger, and Salisbury under the command of Charles Watson in addition to Clive's land forces.

== Battle ==
Though "the guns of the fort did a great deal of damage", including casualties amounting to 37 killed and 74 wounded on the Tiger, the British attack was successful. In order to capture the French fortifications guarding the town, Kent and Tiger managed to edge up the Hooghly River, although the French had tried to block their passage with scuttled ships and river chains. When they were close to the fort, they opened fire with all guns, but took a great punishment from the French artillery in the process.

== Aftermath ==
The town's fortifications and many houses were demolished thereafter, and Chandernagore's importance as a commercial centre was eclipsed by that of Calcutta just downriver. Chandannagar remained under military occupation by the British until the signing of the Treaty of Paris in 1763, which brought an end to the war; the treaty stipulated that Chandernagore would be restored to the French. The settlement was occupied by the British again in 1794 during the French Revolutionary Wars. The city was returned to France in 1816, along with a 3 sq mi (7.8 km2) enclave of surrounding territory. It was governed as part of French India until 1950, under the political control of the governor-general in Pondicherry.

== Legacy ==
The Battle of Chandannagar was one of the many fought between the French and British on the Indian subcontinent during the Seven Years' War. It gave the British effective control of Calcutta and the Bengal hinterland. The French who escaped took shelter with the Nawab, whom Clive shortly afterwards defeated at Plassey. Britain finished the war as the dominant European power in Colonial India, and was well-placed to take advantage of the weakening political and economic power of the Mughal Empire. Chandernagore's capture was the first step in the British driving the French from Bengal.
