= Chandranagar, Dahanu =

Village in Maharashtra, India

Chandranagar
- village
- Location in Maharashtra, India Chandranagar (India)
- Coordinates: 19.8428782°N 73.0080576°E
- Country: India
- State: Maharashtra
- District: Palghar
- Taluka: Dahanu
- Elevation: 120 m (390 ft)

Population (2011)
  - Total: 2,039
- Time zone: UTC+5:30 (IST)
- 2011 census code: 551743

Chandranagar is a village in the Palghar district of Maharashtra, India. It is located in the Dahanu taluka.

Chandra nagar(Dharti) housing society is the main society located in area. The area is centrally located with lush green flora and fauna.

== Demographics ==
According to the 2011 census of India, Chandranagar has 394 households. The effective literacy rate (i.e. the literacy rate of population excluding children aged 6 and below) is 55.87%. Chandra nagar(Dharti) housing society is the main society located in area.

Demographics (2011 Census)
	Total	Male	Female
Population	2039	1036	1003
Children aged below 6 years	310	156	154
Scheduled caste	0	0	0
Scheduled tribe	1954	992	962
Literates	966	599	367
Workers (all)	1091	591	500
Main workers (total)	820	470	350
Main workers: Cultivators	129	77	52
Main workers: Agricultural labourers	495	243	252
Main workers: Household industry workers	28	6	22
Main workers: Other	168	144	24
Marginal workers (total)	271	121	150
Marginal workers: Cultivators	5	3	2
Marginal workers: Agricultural labourers	216	90	126
Marginal workers: Household industry workers	12	3	9
Marginal workers: Others	38	25	13
Non-workers	948	445	503
