= St Joseph's Convent, Chandannagar =

St. Joseph's Convent

Location
- Strand Road, Chandannagar, West Bengal- 712136; Chandannagar, West Bengal 712136; India
- 22.87°N 88.38°E

Information
- Motto: Pray and Work
- Established: 1861
- Status: Active
- School board: ICSE and ISC
- School district: Hooghly
- Principal: Sister Anna Maria
- Gender: Female
- Language: English
- Campus: Urban
- Colours: Red (Nannette Nursery); White and blue (K.G. - XII)
- Nickname: Josephite
- Affiliation: Council for the Indian School Certificate Examinations (CISCE)
- Website: sjc.net.in

St Joseph's Convent (SJC) is a Catholic all-girls school in Chandannagar, established in 1861 by the Sisters of St. Joseph of Cluny in the Archdiocese of Calcutta. It is affiliated to the Indian Certificate of Secondary Education and Indian School Certificate examinations.

== School houses ==
St. Joseph's Convent, Chandannagar has four houses with their own colours and mottos as given below.

House	Colour	Motto
The Annette House	Sky blue	Faith in God and in Ourselves
The Immaculate House	Yellow	True to our Trust
The Josephite House	Green	Persevere to the End
The Marian House	Pink	Service before Self

== Co-curricular activities ==
- Girl Guiding
- Dramatics
- Games
- Dancing, Singing, Music/Band, Art & Craft
- Charity Drives and Social Service
- Leadership Training Services
- Clubs(Nature, Quiz, Debate, karate, Computer Science, Yoga)
