= Charles Watson (Royal Navy officer) =

Royal Navy officer and colonial administrator

Vice-Admiral Charles Watson
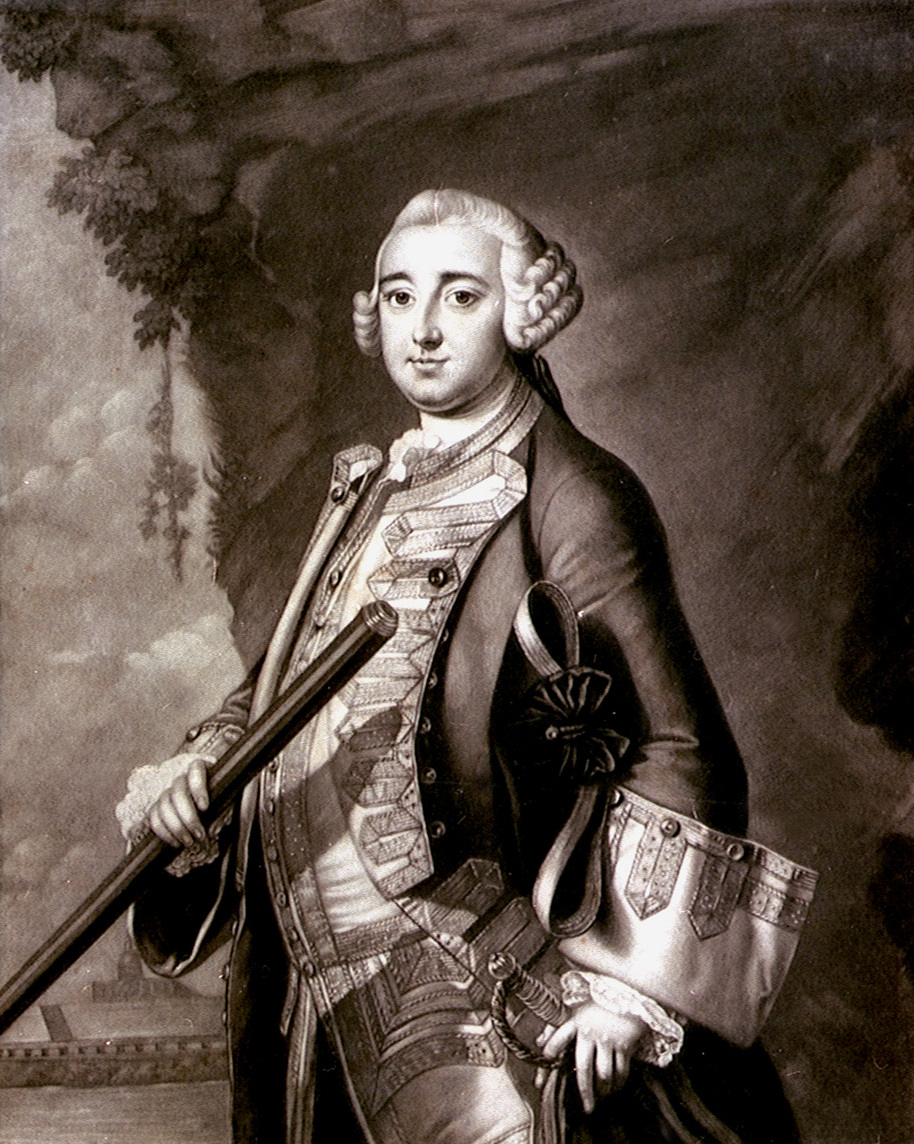
- Engraving of Watson
- Born: 1714
- Died: 16 August 1757 (aged 42–43); Calcutta, India
- Military career
- Allegiance: Great Britain
- Branch: Royal Navy
- Rank: Vice-admiral
- Commands: HMS Garland; HMS Plymouth; HMS Dragon; HMS Princess Louisa; Newfoundland and North American station East Indies Station
- Conflicts: War of the Austrian Succession; Seven Years' War

Viceregal styles of Charles Watson
- Reference style: His Excellency
- Spoken style: Your Excellency

Vice-Admiral Charles Watson (1714 – 16 August 1757) was a Royal Navy officer and colonial administrator who served as the governor of Newfoundland and died in Calcutta, India.

== Origins ==
He was the son of John Watson by his wife the sister of Sir Charles Wager (1666–1743), First Lord of the Admiralty. The armorials used by his son the 1st baronet (Argent, on a chevron engrailled azure between three martlets sable as many crescents or) are a differenced version of the arms of the Watson family, Marquess of Rockingham, and thus the family may have been a cadet branch of the latter.

== Naval career ==
Watson entered the navy as a volunteer per order on HMS Romney in 1728. He was promoted lieutenant in 1734 and promoted captain and given command of HMS Garland in 1738. He transferred to HMS Plymouth in May 1741 and to HMS Dragon in November 1742 which he commanded in the Battle of Toulon.

In 1746 he transferred to HMS Princess Louisa which he commanded at the First Battle of Cape Finisterre in May 1747 and in the Second Battle of Cape Finisterre in October 1747. In January 1748 he was appointed commander-in-chief of the Newfoundland and North American station with his flag in HMS Lion. He became governor of Newfoundland and commander-in-chief of Cape Breton. The position of governor of the colony had temporarily lapsed after the departure of Richard Edwards and therefore his successor, James Douglas, was not a governor of the island but commodore. No commodore nor governor was sent in 1747, but Charles Watson became the governor on arrival in 1748. As governor of Newfoundland he set about deporting Irish and Scots Catholics from the colony.

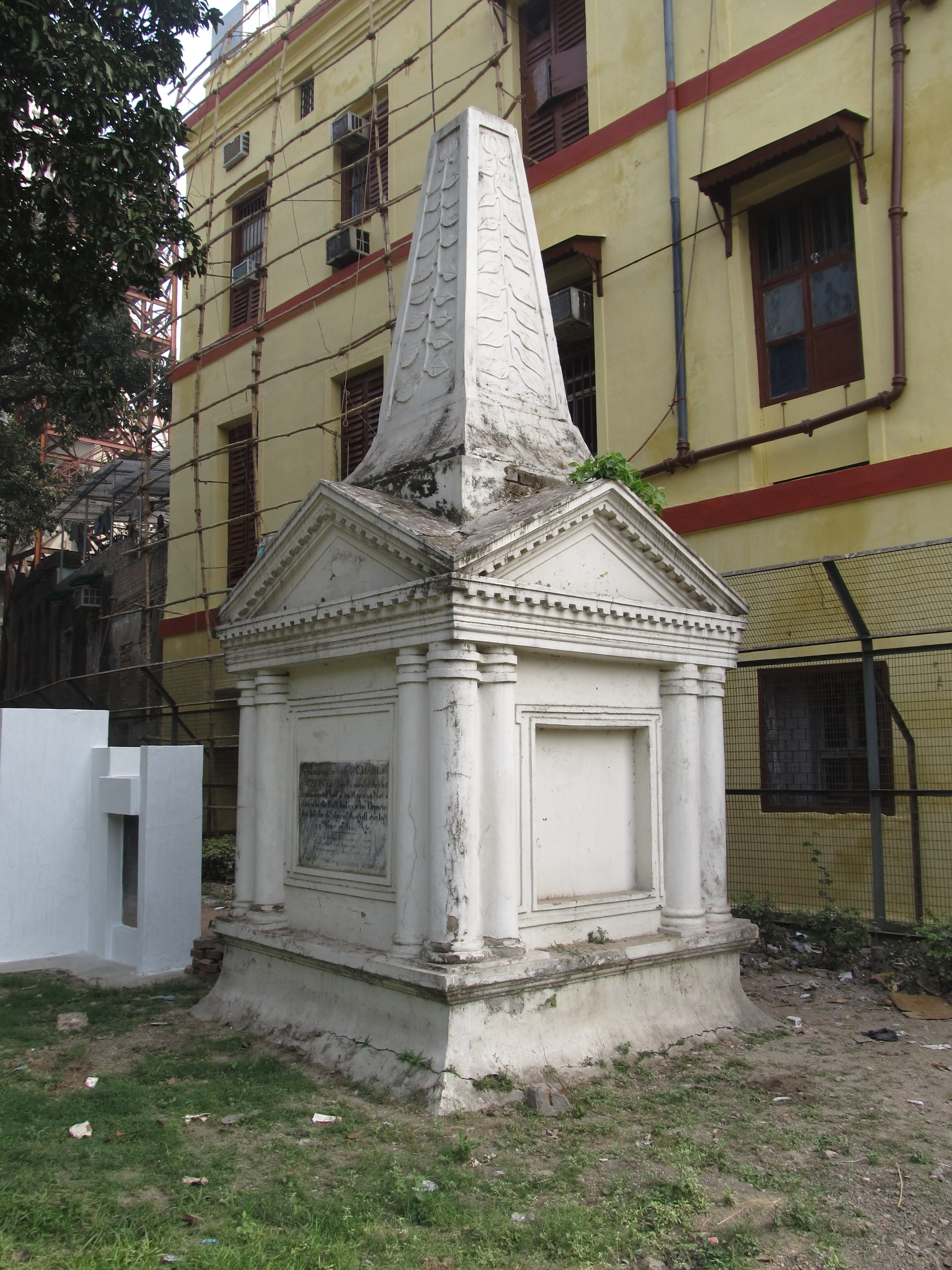
The tomb of Charles Watson at St. John's Churchyard, Kolkata, India

In 1754 he became Commander-in-Chief, East Indies. The English settlement at Fort William, India sought assistance from the Presidency of Fort St. George at Madras, which sent Colonel Robert Clive and Admiral Charles Watson. They re-captured Calcutta on 2 January 1757, but the Nawab marched again on Calcutta on 5 February 1757, and was surprised by a dawn attack by the English. This resulted in the Treaty of Alinagar on 7 February 1757. However the Nawab was subsequently bolstered by French support, and the Battle of Chandannagar in March, and then the Battle of Plassey in June 1757, followed. Watson was promoted to Vice-Admiral of the White in 1757.

Watson's quick rise through the ranks is thought to be attributed from his uncle, Sir Charles Wager, who was first lord of the admiralty. There is a memorial to Watson in Westminster Abbey, London.

== Marriage and children ==
He married Rebecca Buller, daughter of John Francis Buller (1695–1751) of Morval in Cornwall, in 1741. She was co-heiress of the manor of Combe Martin, inherited jointly with her brother Francis Buller of Antony House in Cornwall from her father. Their son and heir was:

- Sir Charles Watson, 1st Baronet, of Fulmer, Buckinghamshire, created a baronet in 1760.

== See also ==
- Governors of Newfoundland
- List of people from Newfoundland and Labrador

Political offices
Preceded by James Douglas	Governor of Newfoundland; 1748–1748	Succeeded by George Brydges Rodney
