= Très honorable avec félicitations =

Très honorable avec félicitations du jury, meaning "Very Honorable, with Committee Praise", was the highest academic distinction awarded in the French academic university system.

The doctoral academic distinctions were, in ascending order, honorable, très honorable, très honorable avec félicitations du jury. They are entirely distinct from bachelor's and master's distinctions, which are Assez bien, Bien and Très bien, as they are awarded by the Thesis Committee right after the thesis' Defense. The félicitations du jury were an exceptional distinction, requiring a positive secret vote by the Committee and a special memo to be written by the Committee Chairperson to justify this honor. Due to the disparity of treatment –some universities delivering it systematically, others very infrequently– many universities ruled out the mention of félicitations du jury in the report.

Since a 2016 ruling, in France, the title of Doctor is no longer assorted with a distinctive mention or accolade.
