= Dinesh Chandra Majumdar =

Bengali revolutionary (1907-1934)

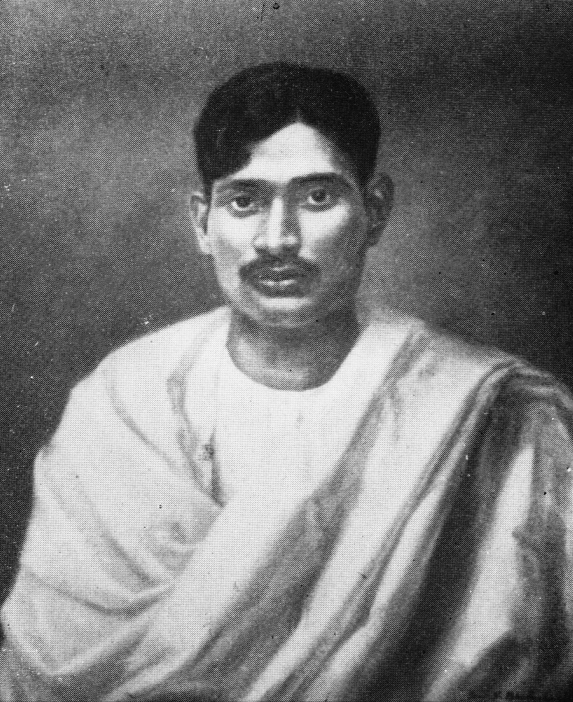
- Born: 15 May 1907; Basirhat, North 24 Parganas, British India
- Died: 9 July 1934 (aged 27); Alipore Central Jail India
- Occupation: Revolutionary
- Movement: Indian Freedom Movement

Dinesh Chandra Majumdar (15 May 1907 – 9 July 1934) was an Indian revolutionary and member of the Yugantar group who carried out assassinations against British colonial officials in an attempt to secure Indian independence.

== Early life and education ==
Dinesh Chandra Majumdar was one of the leading figures of the anti-British independence movement of the Indian subcontinent and a martyred revolutionary of the Age of Fire. He joined the Jugantar Revolutionary Party through his neighbor Anujacharan Sen. During the World War I, during the revolutionary uprising led by Bagha Jatin, when Shaileshwar Bose, the director of the secret base in Balasore, Odisha, fell ill with tuberculosis, Dinesh worked with Anujacharan at night. Then, on the instructions of the party leader, he started working in revolutionary organizations in Bogra and South 24 Parganas. He helped establish the Chhaatri Sangha as a teacher of baton fighting. By virtue of his extraordinary personality, skills, and dedication, Dinesh soon became a popular name in the 'Yugantar' party, which included women members like Kalyani Das (Bhattacharya), Shantisudha Ghosh (later became the Principal of Mahasin College, Hooghly), Sulata Kar (a renowned writer and social worker), Prabhat Nalini Devi, Leela Kamale (a student from Maharashtra), Ava De, Kamala Dasgupta, Surma Mitra (President of the Society), Suhasini Dutta, Kalpana Dutta, and Pritilata Waddedar.

== Revolutionary activities ==
During the Civil Non-Cooperation Movement of 1921, the anti-British clandestine activities of various revolutionary parties, groups, and societies threatened and agitated the foundations of British imperialism in India. The most notable of these were the Anushilan Samiti of East Bengal and 'Yugantar' of West Bengal. Dinesh came to his birthplace, Basirhat, and, in active collaboration with Jatindranath Ghoshal, started collecting and training dedicated patriots. Dinesh's initiative was to gather daring youth in a room in the old State Bank building. The aim was to form a secret and trained group of revolutionaries who would be inspired by the ideals of self-organization and patriotism for the freedom of the motherland. In 1930, Dinesh established the 'National Library' and 'Byampeeth' (a yoga center) at Basirhat. The latter was a secret center for enlisting revolutionary soldiers who trained in firearms, sticks, and knives and made bombs. On August 25, 1930, Dinesh and his three associates, Anujacharan Sen, Shailen Neogi, and Atul Sen, threw a bomb at the car of Charles Tegart, the then Commissioner of Police of Calcutta. Although Tegart survived, Dinesh was caught, tried by a special tribunal, and convicted under sections 307/120 B of the Indian Penal Code and 307/34, 4B, 3(6) of the Explosive Substances Act, and sentenced to life imprisonment in the Central Jail, Midnapore. Anujacharan Sen died on the spot.

On February 8, 1932, Dinesh, along with two other revolutionary associates, Sachin Kargupta and Sushil Dasgupta, escaped from jail and concealed their identities. A bounty was declared on his name, and a reward was offered for his arrest. Meanwhile, many revolutionaries who had escaped from Buxa, Hijli, and Midnapore jails were recapture. The police intensified their search for him. Despite this, Dinesh continued his activities for the party, frequently changing his hideout to evade capture.On August 5 and September 28 of the same year, there were two attempts to assassinate Alfred Watson, the editor of The Statesman. When a group of police led by Quinn, the Chandannagar Police Commissioner, chased the revolutionaries, Dinesh shot and killed Quinn. He was eventually given shelter in Chandannagar by the revolutionary Shri Sachchandra Ghosh. Around 1932, the party's condition was weakened by police brutality and mass arrests. He then tried to revive the party by attempting to transfer money with the help of an employee of Grindlays Bank to buy weapons. At that time, he was staying at Narayan Banerjee's house in Cornwallis Street. On May 25, 1933, the police found the house and attacked it, leading to an exchange of fire between both sides. Dinesh, Jagadananda, and Nalini Das fought until they ran out of bullets and were captured wounded. Dinesh was sentenced to death at the trial, while the other two were sentenced to life imprisonment. Dinesh Majumdar was executed by hanging on July 9, 1934.
