= Manikuntala Sen =

Indian politician (c. 1911–1987)

Manikuntala Sen (Bengali: মণিকুন্তলা সেন; c. 1911–1987) was one of the first women to be active in the Communist Party of India. She is best known for her Bengali-language memoir Shediner Kotha (published in English as In Search of Freedom: An Unfinished Journey), in which she describes her experiences as a woman activist during some of the most turbulent times in India's history.

== Early life ==
Manikuntala Sen was born in Barisal, in what is now Bangladesh, an area known for the activities of the nationalist jatra playwright Mukunda Das. Ashwini Kumar Dutta, a prominent nationalist leader and educationist, was a friend of the family and an early influence on her, as was Jagadish Chandra Mukhopadhyay, principal of Brajamohan College, then affiliated with the University of Calcutta, where Manikuntala Sen got her BA degree; Mukhopadhyay especially encouraged her to develop her mind. Sen met Gandhi when he visited Barisal in 1923, and was particularly impressed by the way he exhorted a group of prostitutes to work towards liberation. The family stopped wearing imported fabrics and patronised the Bangalakshmi Mills, owned and run by Indians and an icon of the nationalist movement. Barisal was then a hotbed of revolutionary politics, with the extremist Anushilan Samiti very active. Sen took up teaching at a girls' school where she met Shantisudha Ghosh, a member of the Jugantar party, whose circle read and shared the writings of Marx and Lenin. Initially sceptical, Sen became more and more influenced by their ideas, even more so when she saw Shantisudha Ghosh taken in for questioning and harassed by the police. Sen persuaded her family to allow her to go to Calcutta to complete her studies and, she secretly hoped, to make contact with the Communist Party.

== Studenthood in Calcutta ==
At that time Hindu bhadralok communities in Bengal were more liberal about sending their daughters long distances to study further; Sen found herself part of a group of young girls like herself living in the city for the first time. She stayed in a hostel and soon got over her initial awe at being in the big city. The conservatism and narrowmindedness of the established families she sometimes encountered rather disgusted her, and she also writes with remarkable frankness for her time about the harassment that she and her friends often faced from men. Through her friend Bimal Pratibha Devi, she became acquainted with leaders of the Mahila Shakti Sangha and several prominent Congress women; this nurtured her nascent feminism and inspired her to think about the need for change in women's position in society. She made contact with Saumyendranath Tagore's Revolutionary Communist Party of India. The 'real' Communist Party of India, part of the Third International, was then underground, and after much searching she eventually discovered that its headquarters were in fact in Barisal.

== Early experiences as a communist ==
Sen's parents were initially ambivalent about her involvement with the party, as it was then regarded as a dangerous group of rebels wanted by the authorities, but shortly after she became a communist in 1939, Sen took her mother to a meeting addressed by Biswanath Mukherjee, brother of Ajoy Mukherjee. His impassioned speech converted her mother to the cause, and for a few days she could talk of nothing else. Sen took the opportunity to ask that she be allowed to travel (alone in the company of young male activists) to another meeting. Reluctantly, she was given permission. Living on a nominal party stipend, from 1942 Sen began to travel the country, staying in small villages and addressing the people. She describes how the men would shun her because she was a woman, and the women, in purdah, stayed away because she was a 'leader' and the equivalent of a man. Much patience and tact were required to overcome this barrier.

== World War II and after ==
The year 1943 saw a devastating famine sweep over Bengal, caused by the loss of Burmese rice and the dislocations of war. A cyclone also devastated part of Midnapore district. Sen began relief work there and spent most of the war years travelling the districts helping destitute women. In 1947 India attained independence; a few months later the Communist Party of India was outlawed, and Sen was jailed in 1948. She remained in custody till 1951, and was released to find the Party embroiled in controversy and her beloved Barisal now part of East Pakistan. She withdrew somewhat from the ideological debates dividing Indian communism and increased her work for various feminist organisations such as the Women's International Democratic Federation and the All India Women's Conference. She had come to realise that the Party had integral biases against women and that she would not rise in its hierarchy. Around this time she met her future husband, the Kashmiri Jolly Kaul, also a party activist. She was elected to the West Bengal Legislative Assembly from the Kalighat constituency in 1952, campaigned for the Hindu Code Bill, and clashed with rightwing leaders such as Shyama Prasad Mukherjee.

== War with China ==
The war with China in 1962 brought to a head the various disagreements in the Communist Party of India, and led to a split, with the Indian government conducting a short-lived crackdown on those who continued to support China. Kaul and Sen were unable to bear the thought of choosing between the CPI and CPI(M). Kaul resigned, and though Sen stayed within the party, she withdrew from active participation. The couple moved to Delhi but returned within a few years to Calcutta, where Sen died on 11 September 1987.

== Sources ==
Manikuntala Sen, In Search of Freedom: An Unfinished Journey, (Calcutta: Stree, 2001). Translated from the Bengali by Stree. Original Bengali title Shediner Katha (Calcutta: Nabapatra Prakashan, 1982).
