= Suhasini Ganguly =

Indian freedom fighter (1909–1965)

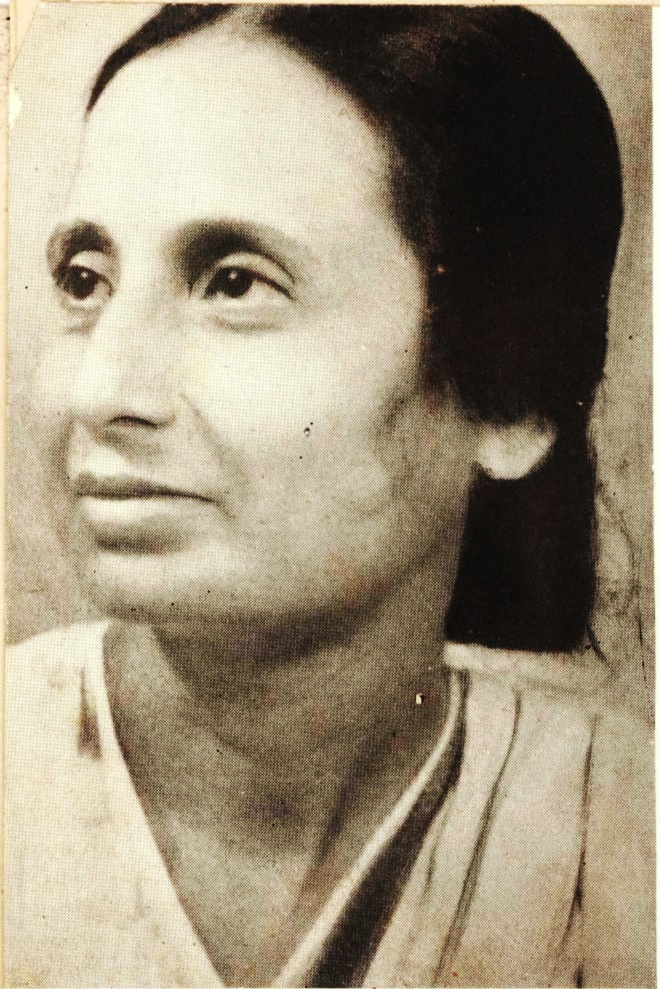
- Born: 3 February 1909; Khulna, Bengal, British Raj
- Died: 23 March 1965 (aged 56); Kolkata, India
- Other name: Putudi
- Political party: Communist Party of India
- Movement: Indian independence movement

Suhasini Ganguly (3 February 1909 – 23 March 1965) was an Indian woman freedom fighter who participated in the Indian independence movement.

== Early life ==
Ganguly was born on 3 February 1909 in Khulna, Bengal, British India to Abinashchandra Ganguly and Sarala Sundara Devi. Their family was from Bikrampur, Dhaka, Bengal. She passed matriculation in 1924 from Dhaka Eden School. While studying Intermediate of Arts, she got a teacher's job at a deaf and dumb school and went to Kolkata.

== Revolutionary activities ==
=== Beginning ===
While staying in Kolkata, she got in touch with Kalyani Das and Kamala Dasgupta. They introduced her to the Jugantar Party. She became a member of Chhatri Sangha. Under Kalyani Das and Kamala Dasgupta's management, Ganguly, on behalf of the Chhatri Sangha, taught swimming in Raja Srish Chandra Nandy's garden. There she became acquainted with the revolutionary Rashik Das in 1929. When the British government discovered her activities she took refuge in Chandannagar, which was a French territory.

=== Chittagong armoury raid ===
After the Chittagong armoury raid on 18 April 1930, at the instruction of the leaders of the Chhatri Sangha, Sashadhar Acharya and Ganguly in a disguise of husband and wife gave shelter in May 1930 to Ananta Singh, Lokenath Bal, Ananda Gupta, Jiban Ghoshal (Makhan) and others in Chandannagar. On 1 September 1930, the British police raided their house and a skirmish followed. Jiban Ghoshal alias died in the gunfight and the other revolutionaries, including Smt. Ganguly were captured. But they were soon released.

=== Other activities ===
She was associated to Bina Das, who attempted to assassinate the Bengal Governor Stanley Jackson in 1932. Under the Bengal Criminal Law Amendment (BCLA) Act, Ganguly was held captive in Hijli Detention Camp from 1932 to 1938. and after her release, she participated in India's Communist movement. She was attached to the women's front of the Communist Part of India. Although she did not participate in the Quit India Movement as the Communist Party of India did not participate, but she helped her Congress colleagues. She was again detained in jail between 1942 and 1945 as she gave shelter to Hemanta Tarafdar, an activist of the Quit India Movement. Ganguly was imprisoned for several months in 1948 and 1949 under the West Bengal Security Act of 1948 for her attachments to communism.

== Later life and death ==
Ganguly was involved in social struggle throughout her life. Due to a road accident in 1965, she was admitted to P. G. Hospital of Kolkata. But due to negligence, she became infected with tetanus and died on 23 March 1965.
