= Flora Zaibun Majid =

Bangladeshi scientist

- ফ্লোরা জাইবুন মাজিদ
- Born: 6 December 1939; Dhaka, Bengal Presidency, British India
- Died: 30 October 2018 (aged 78)
- Education: Dhaka University (BSc); Michigan State University (PhD)
- Known for: Scientist, researcher, writer

Flora Zaibun Majid (6 December 1939 – 30 October 2018) was a Bangladeshi scientist. She was the former chair of BCSIR. She contributed to the field of research in botany and nutrition science in Bangladesh. Flora researched over two decades on different topics and specially known for leading the Spirulina project in BCSIR.

== Early life and education ==
Flora is the daughter of M A Majid and Najmannessa Majid. Her father was a civil servant. Born on 6 December 1939, she suffered from polio when she was nine months old. Flora attended Quamrunnesa School and Eden Mohila College. Flora studied at the Dhaka University and was the first student to receive a First Class Honours in Botany in 1960. She obtained a Fulbright scholarship to study at Michigan State University.

== Research and career ==
She was the first woman and first working scientist to serve as chairman of BCSIR.

== Death ==
She died on 30 October 2018 at the age of 79.

== Awards and honors ==
Awards	Year	Organisation
Gold medal	1997	Bangladesh Women Scientists Association
Gold medal	1984	Begum Zebunnessa and Kazi Mahbubullah Janakalyan Trust
Gold medal	1981	Bangladesh Women Scientists Association
Gold medal	1984	Bangladesh Academy of Sciences
Golden Jubilee Commemorative Medal	2006	BCSIR
