= Bethune College =

First women's college in Bengal

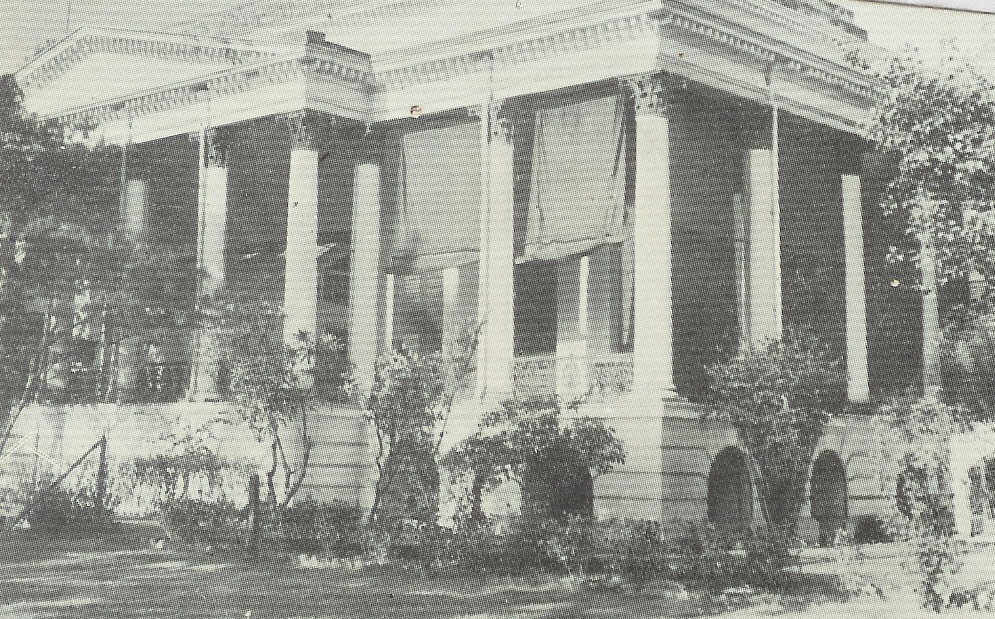
- Bethune School Building, c. 1949
- Motto: Viddaya Vindatey Amritam
- Motto in English: knowledge provides immortal bliss
- Type: Women's college
- Established: 1879; 147 years ago
- Accreditation: NAAC
- Affiliations: University of Calcutta
- Principal: Dr. Rajyasri Roy
- Location: Kolkata, West Bengal, India; 22°35′18″N 88°22′04″E
- Campus: Urban
- Website: www.bethunecollege.ac.in
- Seal of the Bethune College

Bethune College is a women's college located on Bidhan Sarani in Kolkata, India, and affiliated to the University of Calcutta. It is the oldest women's college in India. It was established as a girls' school in 1849, and as a college in 1879.

== History ==
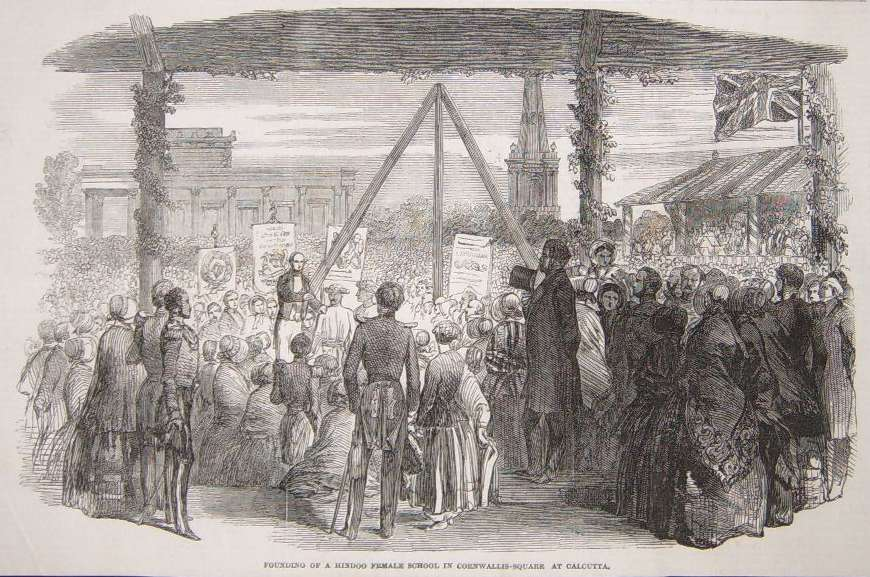
Laying of the foundation stone at Cornwallis Square, November 1850

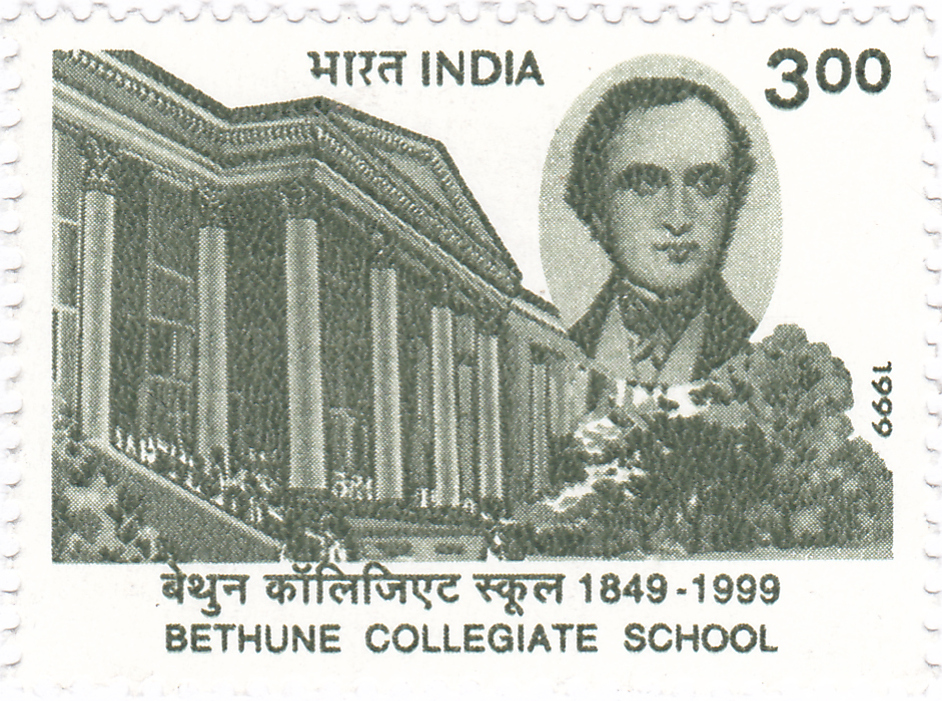
A 1999 stamp dedicated to the Bethune Collegiate School

The college was founded as the Calcutta Female School in 1849 by John Elliot Drinkwater Bethune, with the financial support of Dakshinaranjan Mukherjee. The school started in Mukherjee's home in Baitakkhana, with 21 girls enrolled. The following year, enrolment rose to 80. In November, on a plot on the west side of Cornwallis Square, the cornerstone for a permanent school building was laid. The name "Hindu Female School" was inscribed on the copper-plate placed in the stone and on the ceremonial silver trowel made for the occasion. Support for the school waned after Bethune's death in August 1851.

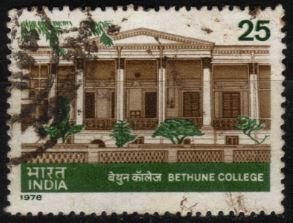
Postage stamp of 1978 commemorating the centenary of Bethune College

The government took it over in 1856, renaming it Bethune School after its founder in 1862–63. In 1879 it was developed into Bethune College, the first women's college in India, and Bethune School was the second (the first being in Bhidewada Pune, by Jyotirao Phule) women's school in all of Asia.

== Rankings ==
College rankings

General – India
- NIRF (Colleges) (2024): 91

The college is ranked 91st among colleges in India by the National Institutional Ranking Framework (NIRF) in 2024.

== Notable alumni ==
- Kadambini Ganguly (1861–1923), one of the first two female graduates of the British Empire
- Chandramukhi Basu (1860–1944), one of the first two female graduates of the British Empire
- Abala Bose (1864–1951), social worker
- Meenakshi Chatterjee (1957–2022), Applied Mathematician, and the 5th Indian Woman in Antarctica (as part of the Xth Indian Scientific Expedition to Antarctica, 1990–91); also the first scientist to represent the University of Calcutta
- Sarala Devi Chaudhurani (1872–1945), promoter of female education
- Anwara Bahar Chowdhury (1919–1987), social activist and writer
- Kamala Das Gupta (1907–2000), freedom fighter nationalist
- Amalprava Das, social worker
- Bina Das (1911–1986), revolutionary and nationalist
- Tista Das (born 1978), transsexual actress
- Kalpana Datta (1913–1995), independence activist
- Mira Datta Gupta (1907–1983), freedom fighter and activist
- Swarnakumari Devi (1855–1932), poet, novelist and social worker
- Begum Khaleda Zia, first female Prime Minister of Bangladesh
- Ashoka Gupta (1912–2008), freedom fighter and social worker
- Neena Gupta, (born 1984) mathematician, who has provided a solution to the Zariski Cancellation Problem
- Narmada Kar (1893–1980), completed her graduation in 1914 and became the first women graduate of Odisha.
- Aditi Lahiri (born 1952), academic linguist
- Abha Maiti (born 1925), politician
- Kanak Mukherjee (1921–1995), political activist
- Khanto Bala Rai (born 1897), teacher, school head in Midnapore
- Shukhalata Rao(1886–1969), social worker and children's author
- Kamini Roy (1864–1933), poet, social worker and feminist
- Leela Roy (1900–1970), politician and reformer
- Shobha Sen, actress
- Amiya Tagore (1901–1988), singer
- Pritilata Waddedar (1911–1932), revolutionary nationalist

== Notable Faculty ==
- Syamadas Mukhopadhyaya
- Krishna Chandra Bhattacharya
- Chinmoy Guha

== See also ==
- List of colleges affiliated to the University of Calcutta
- Education in India
- Education in West Bengal
