= Chhatri Sangha =

Indian women's student organization

The Chhatri Sangha (Girls' Students' Association) was an Indian women's student organization. It recruited and trained women revolutionaries, organized study circles and gave lessons in cycling, driving and armed warfare. It functioned as the girls' faction of the All India Students' Federation.

== History ==
In a meet of All Bengal Students' Association, presided by Subhash Chandra Bose in 1928, girl students of ABSA took a resolution to share the same footage as men in the student movement. After that, Kalyani Das, with the help of her classmates and friends Surama Mitra, Kamala Dasgupta and others, founded Calcutta's first women's student union Chhatri Sangha in September 1928 at Calcutta University under the auspices of Dr. Sarvapalli Radhakrishnan. Surama Mitra was the president and Kalyani Das the secretary. They had direct contact with Dipali Sangha, a women's revolutionary organization based in Dhaka under the leadership of Leela Roy.

The Chhatri Sangha developed a close relationship with Dinesh Majumder, an organizer of revolutionary activities in Calcutta in the early 1930s. Majumdar used to train young girls in physical exercises and lathi play. The Communist Party used to recruit Chhatri Sangha to volunteer in refugee camps in Sealdah and elsewhere. This involved relief work such as serving food. Some lived in hostels where bombs were hidden and delivered to the revolutionaries.

The members of this group included Kalpana Dutta, was arrested and exiled for life for her role in the Chittagong Armory raid. Pritilata Waddedar died in action after leading a raid on a Railway Officers' Club in 1932. The group also included Santi and Suniti, who shot the District Magistrate of Comilla and were sentenced to life imprisonment. Bina Das shot the British Governor of Bengal at a college convocation in 1932 and was imprisoned. Kamala Das Gupta acted as a courier, even carrying bombs.

Many members of the Chhatri Sangha were inspired by Subhas Chandra Bose, one of the leading 1930s socialist leaders, who formed the Indian National Army to fight the British. They responded to Bose's appeal to women to join the struggle by joining the women's militia called the Rani Jhansi Regiment. The Regiment was led by Captain Lakshmi Sahgal, who held the captaincy. Most of these women were branded terrorists, and later joined the Communist Party of India, opposing the policies of the Indian National Congress.
