= Kalipada Chakrabarty =

Indian communist revolutionary

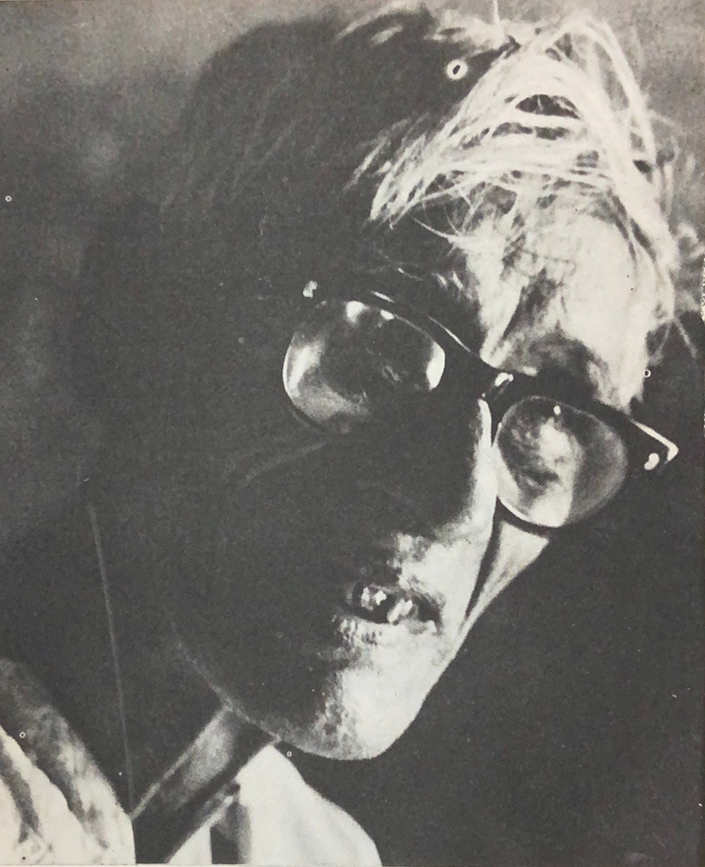
- Born: 1910; Saroatali, Boalkhali, Chittagong, British India
- Organization(s): Jugantar; Communist Consolidation
- Political party: Communist Party of India

Kalipada Chakrabarty (born 1910, date of death unknown) was an Indian communist revolutionary. Was part of a team that led the 1930 Chittagong armoury raid in Chittagong, British India.

== Revolutionary activities ==
Young revolutionary Kalipada Chakrabarty participated in all movements from the Armory raid to the Jalalabad War. Kalipada, along with Ramakrishna, was assigned to assassinate Bengal Inspector General Craig, who came to Chittagong to tighten the police system of the district. As planned, when the train stopped, they came to Craig's compartment, and stood ready on the railway platform with their loaded revolvers in their hands. But moments later, Inspector Tarini Charan Mukherji, seeing an officer resembling Mr. Craig and wearing a Craig-like uniform, shot him dead mistaking him to be Mr. Craig; they fled, but were chased by the police and arrested about 20 miles from Chandpur. In their trial by a special tribunal held by the British Government, his comrade Ramakrishna was sentenced to death. Although not executed, Kalipada was commuted to life imprisonment in the Cellular Jail.

Chakrabarty continued the revolutionary struggle, becoming active in Communist Consolidation. Furthermore, through the process of building a political study circles and revolutionary university in the Cellular Jail in the lives of political prisoners, Kalipada matured ideologically from revolutionary terrorism with the main body of revolutionaries to international communist ideological revolutionism of the working class. He participated in two long historical hunger strikes in the Cellular Jail and later another 36-day hunger strike.
