= Beni Madhab Das =

Bengali scholar and teacher (1866–1952)

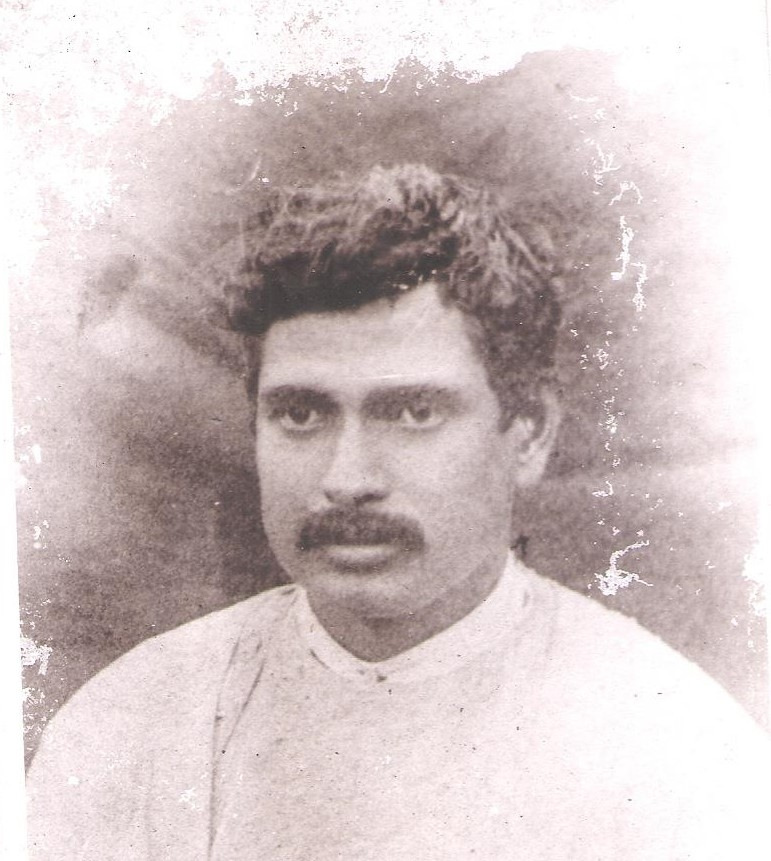
- Born: 22 November 1886; Sheoratali village, Chittagong District, Bengal Presidency (present-day Bangladesh)
- Died: 2 September 1952 (aged 65); Calcutta

Beni Madhab Das (22 November 1886 – 2 September 1952) was a Bengali scholar, teacher, and patriot. He was an influential teacher in the lives of many prominent personalities including Sarat Chandra Bose, Subhas Chandra Bose, Bhagabati Charan Panigrahi and Nandini Satpathy all in different years. His children included famous revolutionaries Kalyani Das (Bhattacharya) and Bina Das (Bhaumik) who were inspired by his philosophy. He was himself believer of peace. But when his children were found to be involved in armed freedom movement he never never tried to discourage or disown them, rather blessed them with his whole heart.

== Early life ==
Beni Madhab Das was born in Sheoratali village in Chittagong District of what is now Bangladesh. His father's name was Krishna Chandra Das. After receiving higher education in philosophy, he joined Chittagong College as a teacher. After Chittagong, he taught at schools and colleges in Dhaka, Cuttack Ravenshaw School, Krishnanagar Collegiate School, and Calcutta. Under the influence of Brahmo leader and sage Keshab Chandra Sen, he joined the Brahmo Samaj and was associated with the Brahmo Samaj publications Indian Messenger and Nababidhan.

== Teaching ==
Beni Madhab was a teacher of philosophy, and a scholar in economics and history. He presided over the All India Theistic Conference held in Kakinada (now in Andhra Pradesh, India) in 1923. His presidential address was later published as a booklet titled Modern Theistic Movement in India. His essay collection Pilgrimage Through Prayers received high praise from critics. Subhas Chandra mentioned him in his book Bharata Pathik.

Another scholar who came into contact with Beni Madhab in Cuttack and Krishnanagar, Niranjan Niyogi, wrote: "There was no harshness in his administration, no pompous display surrounding it – his cool and charming behaviour used to have a remarkable impact on his students. Even those who were turbulent calmed down, became respectful towards him and were endeared to his affections."

== Family life ==
Beni Madhab Das belonged to a political family. His second son (Bina's "Mejda" i.e. second elder brother) was imprisoned for participating in the Non-cooperation movement and national movement. His wife Sarada Devi was the daughter of Madhusudan Sen. Madhusudan Sen had worked as secretary of the Sadharan Brahmo Samaj in Calcutta before retiring and moving to Dhaka. Sarada Devi was active in social service. They had two daughters and possibly three sons. The youngest son was Amal (younger than Beena). The two youngest daughters were famous revolutionaries Kalyani Das (Bhattacharya) and Bina Das (Bhaumik). The other three daughters were Kamala, Sushila, Punnya Prabha. Kalyani was involved in social service and revolutionary activities and was the founder of the "Chhatri Sangha". She was imprisoned for anti-British politics. Bina Das was active in armed revolution against the British and was sentenced to nine years' imprisonment for attempting to assassinate the British Governor of Bengal Stanley Jackson with a pistol at the age of 21 in University of Calcutta convocation on 6 February 1932. Far from discouraging his daughter's revolutionary activities, the patriotic Beni Madhab indirectly encouraged and directly continued moral support for them.

== Death ==
He died on 2 September 1952 in Calcutta.
