= Kalpana Datta =

Indian revolutionary and politician (1913–1995)

Kalpana Dutta (কল্পনা দত্ত)
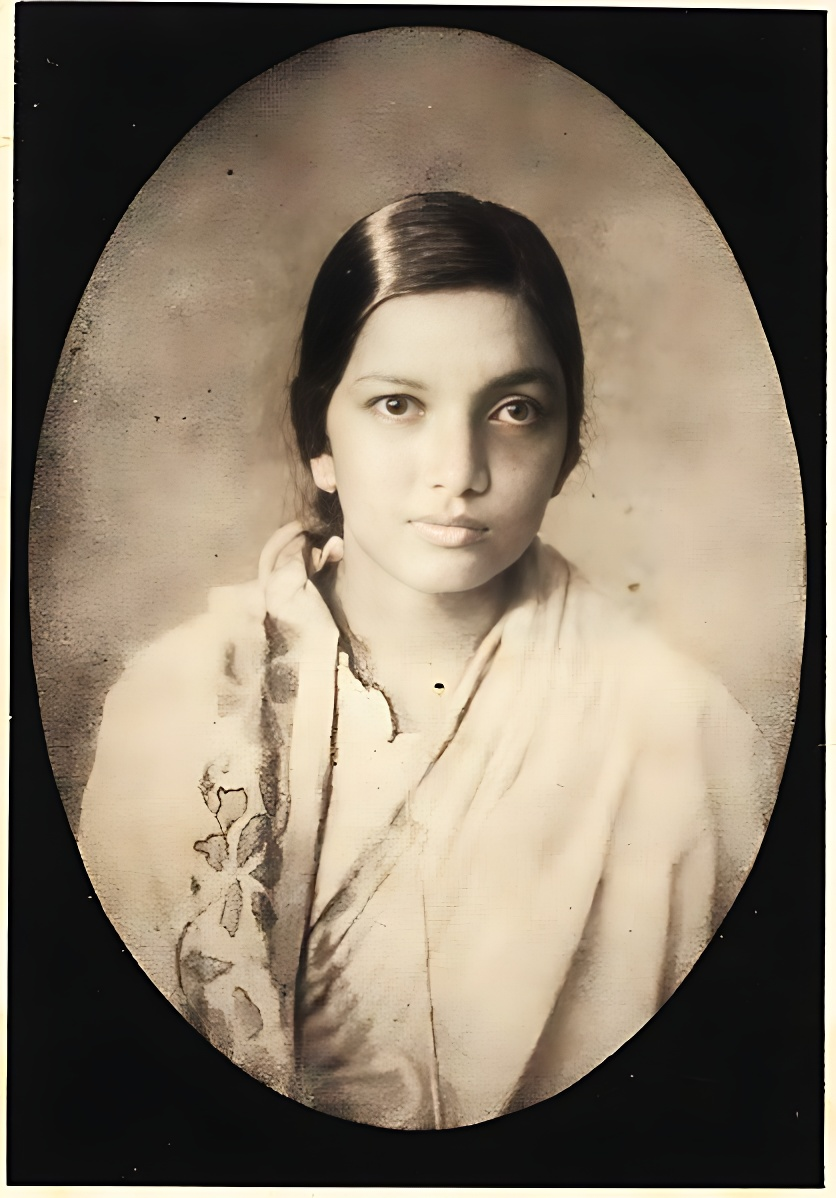

Personal details
- Born: 27 July 1913 Boalkhali, Bengal Province, British India
- Died: 8 February 1995 (aged 81) Kolkata, West Bengal, India
- Party: Communist Party of India
- Spouse: Puran Chand Joshi
- Profession: Indian independence movement activist, revolutionist

Kalpana Datta (27 July 1913 – 8 February 1995), also known as Kalpana Joshi, was an Indian independence movement activist and a member of the armed independence movement led by Surya Sen, which carried out the Chittagong armoury raid in 1930. Later she joined the Communist Party of India and married Puran Chand Joshi, the general secretary of the party, in 1943.

== Early life ==
Kalpana Datta (also commonly spelled Dutta) was born at Sripur, a village of Chittagong District in the Bengal Province of British India (Sripur is now located in Boalkhali Upazila in Bangladesh). Her father, Binod Behari Dattagupta, was a government employee. After passing her matriculation examination in 1929 in Chittagong, she went to Calcutta and joined the Bethune College to study science. Soon, she joined the Chhatri Sangha (Women Students Association), a semi-revolutionary organization in which Bina Das and Pritilata Waddedar were also active members.

== Armed independence movement ==
The Chittagong armoury raid was carried out on 18 April 1930. Kalpana joined the "Indian Republican Army, Chattagram branch," the armed resistance group led by Surya Sen, in May 1931. In September 1931, Surya Sen entrusted her, along with Pritilata Waddedar, to attack the European Club in Chittagong. A week before the attack, she was arrested while carrying out reconnaissance of the area. She went into hiding after her release on bail. On 16 February 1933, the police encircled their hiding place in Gairala village. During this raid, Surya Sen was arrested, but Kalpana managed to escape. To free Surya, she tried to bomb the jail but failed.

Kalpana was finally arrested on 19 May 1933. In the second supplementary trial of the Chittagong armoury raid case, Kalpana was sentenced to transportation for life. She was released in 1939.

== Later life ==
Kalpana Datta graduated from the Calcutta University in 1940 and joined the Communist Party of India. She served as a relief worker during the 1943 Bengal famine and during the Partition of Bengal. She wrote an autobiographical book in Bengali, "চট্টগ্রাম অস্ত্রাগার আক্রমণকারীদের স্মৃতিকথা", which was translated into English by Arun Bose and Nikhil Chakraborty with a preface by her husband, Com. P. C. Joshi, a communist leader, as "Chittagong Armoury Raiders: Reminiscences," published in English in October 1945. In 1946, she contested in the elections for the Bengal Legislative Assembly as a Communist Party of India candidate from Chittagong but could not win.

Later, she joined the Indian Statistical Institute, where she worked until her retirement. She died in Calcutta on 8 February 1995.

== Personal life ==
In 1943, she married the then general secretary of the Communist Party of India, Puran Chand Joshi. They had two sons: Chand and Suraj. Chand Joshi (1946–2000) was a noted journalist, who worked for the Hindustan Times. He was also known for his work, Bhindranwale: Myth and Reality (1984). Chand's wife, Manini (née Chatterjee), penned a book on the Chattagram armoury raid, titled Do and Die: The Chattagram Uprising 1930-34.

== Artistic depictions ==
In 2010, Deepika Padukone portrayed Kalpana Datta in the Hindi film Khelein Hum Jee Jaan Sey, with Abhishek Bachchan portraying Surya Sen.

Another movie, Chittagong, was released on 12 October 2012, based on the uprising. It was produced and directed by Bedabrata Pain, an ex-NASA scientist.

== Book ==
Chattagram Astragar Lunthankarider Smritikatha. (January 1946)
