= Kahaani (soundtrack) =

Soundtrack album by Vishal–Shekhar
- Released: 13 February 2012
- Recorded: 2012
- Genre: Feature film soundtrack
- Length: 28:18
- Label: T-Series
- Producer: Vishal–Shekhar

Vishal–Shekhar chronology
| The Dirty Picture (2011) | Kahaani (2012) | Shanghai (2012) |

Kahaani is the soundtrack to the 2012 film of the same name directed by Sujoy Ghosh starring Vidya Balan. The film's music consists of six original songs composed by Vishal–Shekhar, with two of them only featured in the film. The album is individually distinctive to the film, either being defined as both companion piece and a concept album to the story and themes. The songs written by Vishal Dadlani, Anvita Dutt and Sandeep Shrivatsava, consists lyrics in English, Hindi and Bengali languages. T-Series released the film's soundtrack album on 13 February 2012.

== Development ==
Shekhar Ravjiani recalled the film had them a chance to curate an original soundtrack with Balan's character in mind where the audience travels with her, so as the music. He described the six-song soundtrack as a companion piece to the film which describes its mood, while two songs from the soundtrack are only heard in the film. When Ghosh gave the script to the duo, he insisted to design those songs without pinpointing on where the songs to be placed. Hence, they came up with five songs for the film, which did not have lip sync. Ravjiani said that Ghosh would often say "Aami Shotti Bolchi" (transl. I speak the truth), which led Vishal Dadlani pitching the hook line to write lyrics for the song of the same name. That song was performed by Usha Uthup.

Ghosh had an idea for using Rabindranath Tagore's poem "Ekla Chalo Re" as a song for the film. Vishal–Shekhar then tuned it arranged to suit the scenario, by incorporating a Gospel version of the song through Church choir so as to give a new flavour and avoided using an instrumental support, thereby becoming an a cappella number. Ravjiani brought Amitabh Bachchan to perform vocals, who described that Bachchan's voice "just added to the magic of the song. His voice was the best thing that could have happened to that composition."

Clinton Cerejo performed the film score and arranged the songs "Ekla Cholo Re" and "Tore Bina" while Mikey McCleary arranged "Piya Tu Kahe Rootha Re". Javed Bashir performed that track, after Ravjiani searching a random list of Pakistani singers performed on Coke Studio and recorded his vocals in Pakistan.

== Track listing ==
Kahaani (Original Motion Picture Soundtrack)
| No. | Title | Lyrics | Singer(s) | Length |
|---|---|---|---|---|
| 1. | "Aami Shotti Bolchi" | Vishal Dadlani | Usha Uthup, Vishwesh Krishnamurthy | 3:20 |
| 2. | "Piya Tu Kahe Rootha Re" | Anvita Dutt | Javed Bashir | 4:59 |
| 3. | "Kahaani" (Male) | Vishal Dadlani | KK, Vishal Dadlani | 4:26 |
| 4. | "Tore Bina" | Sandeep Srivatsava | Sukhwinder Singh | 5:52 |
| 5. | "Kahaani" (Female) | Vishal Dadlani | Shreya Ghoshal, Vishal Dadlani | 4:28 |
| 6. | "Ekla Cholo Re" | Rabindra Sangeet | Amitabh Bachchan | 5:13 |
| Total length: | | | | 28:18 |

== Release ==
The soundtrack to Kahaani was released at the Kala Ghoda Arts Festival in Mumbai on 13 February 2012, with Balan, Ghosh and the composer duo.

== Reception ==
Reviewing the soundtrack for The Times of India, Anand Vaishnav commented that "Kahaani, as an album, stays honest to the theme of the film". Rohit Vats of CNN-IBN stated that the soundtrack "features right voices with the overall mood of the album". A critic from Mumbai Mirror rated the album with 3 stars out of 5, saying that the music "has its way of standing out among the ordinary". Joginder Tuteja of Bollywood Hungama described it as "a soundtrack that keeps it close to Kahaani across the album" and rated 3.5 out of 5. Kartik Srinivasan of Milliblog wrote, "Kahaani is quite an interesting departure from the duo’s usual sound".

== Accolades ==
| Award | Date of ceremony (Note: Each date is linked to the article about the awards held that year, wherever possible.) | Category | Recipients | Result | Ref |
|---|---|---|---|---|---|
| Mirchi Music Awards | 7 February 2013 | Background Score of the Year | Clinton Cerejo | Won | |
| Screen Awards | 12 January 2013 | Best Background Score | Clinton Cerejo | Nominated | |
| Star Guild Awards (Note: Also known as Apsara Film & Television Producers Guild Awards.) | 16 February 2013 | Best Male Playback Singer | Amitabh Bachchan for "Ekla Cholo Re" | Nominated | |
