= Ramakrishna Biswas =

Bengali revolutionary (1910–1931)

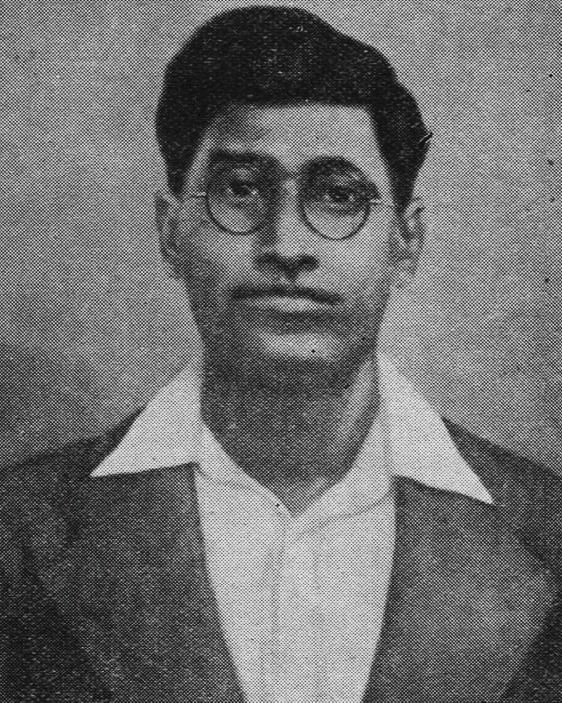
- Martyr Ramkrishna Biswas
- Born: January 16, 1910; Saraotali, Chittagong, British India
- Died: August 4, 1931 (aged 21); Alipore Jail, Kolkata, British India
- Cause of death: Execution by hanging
- Occupation: Revolutionary
- Movement: Indian independence
- Criminal charges: Murder of Inspector Tarini Mukherjee
- Criminal penalty: Sentenced to death

Ramkrishna Biswas (16 January 1910 – 4 August 1931) was an Indian revolutionary and martyr. He was an active member of Surya Sen's revolutionary group.

== Early life ==
Biswas was born in Saroatali, Chittagong in British India. His father's name was Durga Kripa Biswas. In 1928, Biswas came first in an entrance examination among the district, later joining the revolutionary independence movement led by Master Da Surya Sen. In 1930, he was seriously wounded while preparing bombs.

== Revolutionary activities and death ==
Surya Sen and his followers decided to assassinate one Mr. Craig, the Inspector General of Police for Chittagong. Biswas and Kalipada Chakrabarty were assigned to this task. On 1 December 1930, they went to Chandpur station, but mistakenly killed a rail inspector, Tarini Mukherjee, instead of Craig. Biswas and Chakravarty were arrested on 2 December 1930. Biswas's family and friends lacked the funds required to travel from Chittagong to Kolkata and visit him in Alipore Jail, Kolkata. At that time, another revolutionary nationalist Pritilata Waddedar was staying in Kolkata and was asked to meet Biswas. She was successful in pretending to be his sister, in order to gain access. Biswas' martyrdom later inspired Pritilata.

Biswas was sentenced to death after his trial. In the morning of 4 August 1931, he was executed at Alipore Central Jail. His accomplice, Kalipada Chakrabarty, was transported to the Cellular Jail on the Andaman and Nicobar Islands.
