= Narmada Kar =

First Women graduate of Odisha

- Born: 12 October 1893; Cuttack, British India
- Died: 13 September 1980 (aged 86); Kolkata, India
- Other names: Narmada Kar
- Known for: First female graduate of Odisha
- Spouse: Jitendra Kumar Biswas

Narmada Kar (1893–1980), was an editor, writer and the first woman from Odisha in Eastern India, to pass the B.A. examination.

== Early life ==
Kar was born on 12 October 1893 to Biswanath Kar, freedom fighter, social activist and founder of Utkal Sahitya at Cuttack, India. After passing her entrance examination from Calcutta University she joined the historical Bethune College, completed her graduation in 1914, and became the first women graduate of Odisha.

At the age of 16, she married Jitendra Biswas, a Bengali lawyer. She stayed at Calcutta for the education of their children.

== Death ==
On 13 September 1980, Kar died in her house in Calcutta, India.
