= Rama Chowdhury =

Bangladeshi writer and activist

- রমা চৌধুরী
- Born: 14 October 1936; Chittagong, Bengal Presidency, British India
- Died: 3 September 2018 (aged 81); Chittagong, Bangladesh
- Education: University of Dhaka
- Occupations: Writer, activist

Rama Chowdhury (14 October 1936 – 3 September 2018) was a Bangladeshi writer and birangana of Bangladesh Liberation War during 1971. In Bangladesh, she is best known for her autobiographical work "Ekatorer Jononi" ("Mother of 71") which describes the torture committed by Pakistani military during the Bangladesh Liberation War. She was awarded Begum Rokeya Padak by the Government of Bangladesh posthumously in 2019.

== Early life ==
Chowdhury was born on 14 October 1936 at Popadia village in Boalkhali Upazila of Chittagong. In 1961, she graduated with a master's degree in Bengali literature from University of Dhaka and was known as the first woman to hold this degree from the Southern part of Chittagong.

== Career ==
In the following year 1962, Chowdhury commenced her career as the principal of Cox's Bazar High School and for the next 16 years she served the same role at different colleges in Bangladesh. Besides teaching she wrote in a fortnightly magazine and later she took writing as her sole profession. In her lifetime, she has authored around 20 books including poetry, novels and memoirs. After the Liberation War, Rama went through severe financial crisis but she never asked for anyone's help. She wrote and sold her own books from door to door and this remained her only source of income. She wrote 19 books which included articles collection, novels, and poetry.

== Personal life ==
Chowdhury gave birth to three sons and her first two sons died within the two years after the Liberation War, they were only five and three years old then. Her third child died in a road accident in 1998.

Chowdhury buried her three sons underground defying the traditional Hindu funeral system, which she did not agree with. After the death of her third child, she never wore shoes. Rama said that she could not walk with shoes over the same soil where her three children are buried because they would be hurt.

== Death ==
Chowdhury died on 3 September 2018 at Chittagong Medical College Hospital in Chittagong. She had been bedridden with various old age diseases and her condition deteriorated when in 2014 she fell down and fractured her hip. She was buried beside her third son's tomb in Popadia village with full state honors.
