= Khodeja Khatun =

Bangladeshi writer

- Born: August 15, 1917; Mandaldharan village, Bogra District, Bengal Presidency, British India
- Died: February 3, 1990 (aged 72)
- Education: University of Dhaka

Khodeja Khatun (August 15, 1917 – February 3, 1990) was a Bangladeshi educationist, writer and social worker.

== Education and career ==
In 1939, Khatun became the second Muslim woman of Bengal to obtain a master's degree in Bangla literature from the University of Dhaka. In 1941 she became a lecturer in Lady Brabourne College in Kolkata. After the Partition of India in 1947, she migrated to Dhaka.

From 1960, she served as a professor of Bangla at Eden Girls' College for eight years and as principal of the Rajshahi Government Women's College for four years. Later, she served as the principal of Eden Girls' College. She authored several books and continued to publish after retiring as an educationist and until her death in early 1990.

== Works ==
- Bedonar ei Baluchare (1963)
- Rupkathar Rajye (1963)
- Shes Praharer Alo (1969)
- Sagarika (1969)
- Bagurar Lokasahitya (1970)
- Aranya Manjari (1971)
- Ekti Sur Ekti Gan (1982)
- Bhindeshi Sera Galpa (1984)
- Amar Dirgha Bhraman (1985)
- Shatapuspa (3 vols) (1984, 1989 and 1990)

== Awards ==
- President's Gold Medal (1967)
- Nurunnessa Khatun Vidyavinodini Medal (1977)
- Abdur Razzak Memorial Medal (1984)
