= All Bengal Students' Association =

Student organization in India, 1928–1930s

- নিখিলবঙ্গ ছাত্র সমিতি
- Successor: All India Students' Federation
- Formation: 25 August 1928 (98 years ago), Calcutta, Bengal Province, British Raj
- Founder: Pramod Ghosal; Rebati Barman; Biren Dasgupta; Sachindranath Mitra
- Dissolved: 1930s
- Headquarters: 93/1F, Benu Office, Baithakhana Road, Calcutta.
- Members: 20000+ (1929)
- Main organ: Chhatra

The All Bengal Student Association (ABSA) was one of the first student organizations, founded during anti-colonial struggle of India in 1928.

== Preparatory Committee ==
This initiative to organize students was born out of the all-Bengal student strike of 3 February 1928, centered around the movement against the Simon Commission. Some student leaders were assaulted by the police while picketing in front of Presidency College and Scottish Church College in Calcutta. On February 17, 1928, a meeting was convened at the Albert Hall in Calcutta on account of those struggling students, from where another meeting was called on March 6. An organizing committee was formed there. They took the initiative to create a student organization throughout Bengal by holding a provincial student conference.

The organizing committee consisted of Pramod Ghoshal, Birendranath Dasgupta (engineering student of Jadavpur University), Sachindranath Mitra (Scottish Church) and Rebati Barman.

== 1st Conference (Formation) ==
In September 1928, at the end of a four-day conference chaired by Jawaharlal Nehru, the All Bengal Students' Association was established. 22nd to 25th, the conference held at Sradhhananda Park. Student delegates from different parts of Bengal came to the conference. Acting Vice-Chancellor of Calcutta University Dr. Arkohat inaugurated the event. Among the guests of honor were Subhash Chandra Bose and many prominent academics. National leaders along with top student leaders, Pramod Ghoshal, Biren Dasgupta, Sachin Mitra etc. on stage.

Nehru, in his inaugural speech, addressed: “The youth should be pioneer in building a new society, destroying the old... Youth will be able to create a new world only if they are driven by the ideals of anti-imperialism, social justice, social liberation, socialism and internationalism.

In the conference, Pramod Ghoshal was elected as president, Biren Dasgupta as secretary and Sachin Mitra as vice-president.

== 2nd Conference (ABSA-BPSA split) ==
It was decided to hold the second session in Mymensingh. This city was the stronghold of Jugantar Dal. Rebati Barman was the president of the reception committee. His inaugural speech contained strong references to Marxism–Leninism. In the President's speech, Dr. Alam paid tribute to Jatin Das in an emotional speech and urged the students of Bengal to prepare for the coming struggle. His speech reflected a sharp attack on communalism.

The association included many non-partisan student activists and leaders, in addition to the workers Anushilan and Yugantar Dal. Most of the members of the executive committee were not members of any party and cannot be called supporters of any particular party. The All Bengal Student Association became the center of conflict between Anushilan Samiti and the Yugantar Party. At this conference it took an extreme form. On the second day, the organization split up. All Bengal Students Association (ABSA) on one side and Bengal Provincial Students Association (BPSA) on the other. The new organization was in control of Jugantar. Almost all independents remained in the ABSA.
