= Shanta Jahan =

Bengali actress

Shanta Jahan শান্তা জাহান
- Born: April 20, 1993 (age 33); Dhaka, Bangladesh
- Other name: Shirin Jahan Shanta
- Education: Marketing Hon’s from Eden Mohila College
- Occupations: TV host, model and actress
- Years active: 2012-present
- Children: Son (1)
- Website: www.shantajahan.com

Shirin Jahan Shanta popularly known as Shanta Jahan (Bengali: শান্তা জাহান) is a famous television host, model and actress from Bangladesh. She started her career from 2012 and has more than seven years of experience in anchoring and hosting for Bangladesh's most leading TV channels and live events.

== Early life ==
Daughter of Late Abdush Satter and Jahanara Begum, Shanta Jahan born on 20 April 1993 in Dhaka, Bangladesh. She passed her Secondary School Certificate(SSC) from New model bohumukhi High School and Higher Secondary School Certificate(HSC) from Mirpur Bangla College. Shanta Jahan completed her Graduation from Eden Mohila College in Marketing. She is a mother of one son.

== Career ==
She began her career as a TV host in the year 2012 through a program named "সোনার বাংলা" telecast in Channel 9 (Bangladesh). She never looked back after that time. She hosted many mainstream stage shows both in Bangladesh and in foreign countries. Apart from hosting different TV programs she did more than 30 TV commercials and Press Ads including BSRM, BKash, Standard Chartered and other companies. She is a successful model and featured in many mainstream news portals. She started her acting debut in Mabrur Rashid Bannah's serial named Nine & Half. Sources say that she will soon be seen in the films.

== Television ==
Year	Title	Role	Television
2012	Sonar Bangla	Host	Channel 9 (Bangladesh)
	Good Morning Bangladesh	Host	Boishakhi TV
2013–Present	Shornali Shada Kalo	Host	ATN Bangla
2014-2016	Celebrity Talk Show	Host	Boishakhi TV
2014-2017	Chaya Chondo	Host	BTV (Bangladesh)
2014-2017	Tara kothon	Host	BTV (Bangladesh)
2014-2017	Olpo Sholpo Golpo	Host	BTV (Bangladesh)
2016	Shoshur Bari Modhur Hari	Host	ATN Bangla
2016-2018	Crime Patrol	Host	ATN Bangla
2016–Present	Gahiner Gaan	Host	SA TV
2016–Present	Music Station Live	Host	RTV (Indonesian TV network)
2017	EID Special "Tarar Jibon"	Host	ATN Bangla
2017	Pran Premium Ghee Star Cook	Host	Banglavision, Channel 9 (Bangladesh), Desh TV, Asian TV, Mohona TV, Independent Television (Bangladesh)
2017	Football World-cup Live Sambar tale	Host	SA TV
2017-2018	Fold Station	Host	SA TV
2017-2018	Boka Baksher Karkhana	Host	News24 (Bangladesh)
2017–Present	Movie Bazar	Host	Asian TV
2017–Present	Golden Song	Host	Boishakhi TV
2018	Folk Lounge	Host	SA TV
2018	Celebrity Cafe	Host	Asian TV
2018	Heem Shader Ranna	Host	Channel 24 (Bangladesh)
2018-2019	Shotorko Songket	Host	Channel 24 (Bangladesh)
2018-2020	Shokal Belar Roddur	Host	Banglavision
2020	Bijoyini	Host	Channel 9 (Bangladesh)
2020	Godhulir Amontrone	Host	Channel 9 (Bangladesh)
2020	Alap	Host	Boishakhi TV

== Drama ==
Year	Drama	Co-stars	Director	Channel
2013	Opekkhar Photography	Afran Nisho, Mehazabien Chowdhury	Shikhor Shahoniat	Web series
2016	Five Female Friends			GTV (Bangladesh)
2015	Nine & Half	Hasan Imam, Kumkum Hasan, Mumtahina Toya, Siyam Ahmed, Tawsif Mahbub, Salman Muktadir	Mabrur Rashid Bannah	Desh TV

== Short film ==
Year	Drama	Co-stars	Director
2018	Madam You Are Mine	Mushfiq R. Farhan	Iftakhar Ahmed Oshin

== Awards and nominations ==
Year	Award	Result
2013	BABISAS	Won
2019	CJFB	Won
2019	BABISAS	Won
