= Monowara Islam =

Bangladeshi professor, litterateur and language movement activist

- Born: 1936 (age 89–90)
- Occupations: professor, litterateur, activist
- Awards: Ekushey Padak (2019)

Monowara Islam (born 1936) is a Bangladeshi professor, litterateur and language movement activist. In recognition of her contribution to the Bengali language movement, the government of Bangladesh awarded her the country's second highest civilian award Ekushey Padak in 2019.

== Personal life and education ==
Islam was born in 1936 at Khulna in Bengal Presidency of the then British India (now Bangladesh). Her father was the deputy magistrate of the then British government. She has two sons and a daughter.

Islam completed her matriculation from Madaripur, Intermediate studies from Eden Mohila College in 1952 and obtained her BA from the same college. Then she earned her post graduation from Dhaka University.

== Career ==
Islam started her career by joining as head teacher at Munshiganj Girls' High School in 1957. She was then transferred to Azimpur Girls' High School. She taught a number of noted students, including Prime Minister of Bangladesh Sheikh Hasina and professor Khaleda Ekram. As part of her social work, she also served as the president of the Bangladesh Federation of University Women.
