= Shefali Ghosh =

- শেফালী ঘোষ
- Born: c. 1941; Kanungopara, Boalkhali Upazila, Chittagong, Bengal Presidency, British India
- Died: December 31, 2006 (aged 65)
- Occupation: Singer
- Spouse: Nani Gopal Datt
- Awards: Ekushey Padak; Sabdasainika Padak; Bengali Academy Lifetime Achievement Award; Shilpakala Academy Award

Shefali Ghosh (c. 1941 – December 31, 2006) was a Bangladeshi music artist. She sang Chittagong's regional songs. She was awarded Ekushey Padak by the Government of Bangladesh in 2008.

== Early life ==
Ghosh was born in Boalkhali Upazila in Chittagong. She was the second eldest among her ten siblings.

She was married to Nani Gopal Datt.

== Awards ==
- Independent Bengali Radio Sabdasainika Medal (1990)
- Bengali Academy Lifetime Achievement Award (2002)
- Shilpakala Academy Award (2003)
- Ekushey Padak (2008)
