= Jatindra Nath Das =

Indian revolutionary (1904–1929)

- যতীন্দ্রনাথ দাস
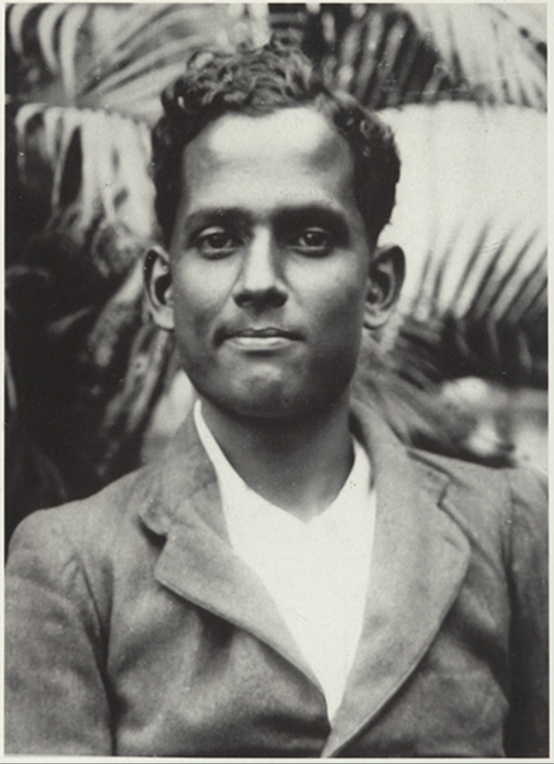
- Jatin Das in c. 1929
- Born: Jatindra Nath Das; 27 October 1904; Calcutta, Bengal Presidency, British India (now Kolkata, West Bengal, India)
- Died: 13 September 1929 (aged 24); Lahore, Punjab Province, British India (now in Punjab, Pakistan)
- Cause of death: Hunger strike
- Other names: Khedu, Jatin Da
- Occupation: Revolutionary
- Employer: Hindustan Socialist Republican Association
- Known for: Following a 63-day hunger strike in prison; Participating in the non-cooperation movement

Signature
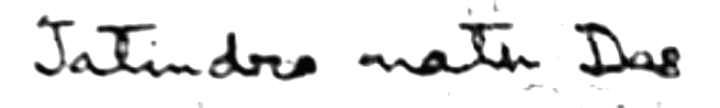

Jatindra Nath Das (Bengali: যতীন্দ্রনাথ দাস; 27 October 1904 – 13 September 1929), better known as Jatin Das, was an Indian freedom fighter and revolutionary who worked to make India independent from the British Raj and was a member of the Hindustan Socialist Republican Association. He died in the Borstal Jail, Lahore after a long 63-day hunger strike for the rights of political prisoners of India's freedom struggle. He was only 24 years old when he died. His death proved to be a major incident in India's struggle for independence with more than five lakhs people attending his funeral.

== Early life ==
Das was born in 1904 in a Bengali Kayastha family at Calcutta to Bankim Behari Das and Smt. Suhasini Debi. Suhasini Debi passed away when Jatin Das was nine years old. He was a brilliant student and passed the matriculation in the First Division in 1921. He joined the Anushilan Samiti, a revolutionary group in Bengal, and also participated in Mahatma Gandhi's non-cooperation movement in 1921, was convicted for picketing foreign cloth shops in Burrabazar in Calcutta and lodged in Hoogly Jail.

He joined South Suburban College(now called Ashutosh College) in 1922 and passed the Intermediate in First Division in 1924. He participated in the North Bengal Flood relief activities during this time. In November 1925, while studying for a B.A. at Vidyasagar College in Calcutta, Das was arrested for his political activities and was imprisoned at the jail in Mymensingh. While interned there, he went on a 21 day hunger strike to protest the ill-treatment meted out to the political prisoners. He along with Panna Babu was transferred to Dacca Central Jail and then to the notorious Mianwali Jail(now in Pakistan) as a punishment for the Mymensingh Jail incident. Jatin was brought back to Bengal and released by the end of October, 1928.

On 14 June 1929, he was arrested for making the 'bomb' which was thrown by Bhagat Singh and Batukeswar Dutt at the Assembly hall during a session. The 'bomb' was made only to make a sound and draw attention and not to harm anyone. He was imprisoned in Lahore Jail to be tried under the supplementary Lahore Conspiracy Case, by the colonial government.

== Hunger strike ==
In Lahore Jail, Das began another hunger strike along with other revolutionary fighters, demanding equality for Indian political prisoners with those from Europe. The conditions of Indian inhabitants of the jails was deplorable. The uniforms that Indian prisoners were required to wear in jail with were not washed for several days, and rats and cockroaches roamed the kitchen area making the food unsafe to eat. Indian prisoners were not provided with any reading material such as newspapers, nor paper to write on. The condition of the British prisoners in the same jail was strikingly different. The hunger strike attracted widespread attention from across the country and leaders took up their cause inside and outside the Central Legislative Assembly. During the hunger strike Subhas Chandra Bose led a joint procession of the South Calcutta Youth Association Naujawan Bharat Sabha (NBS), which had its organisation in Calcutta too, on 11 August 1929 to observe Political Sufferers' Day.

Das's hunger strike started on 13 July 1929 and lasted 63 days. The jail authority took measures to forcibly feed him and the other independence activists. Eventually, the jail authority recommended his unconditional release, but the government rejected the suggestion and offered to release him on bail.

== Death and legacy ==
His medical report of 12 September 1929 read:

'Das has fever- temperature morning 100 degrees, evening 99 degrees, pulse is 130 p.m.-very rapid. Vomitted only once in the day. Retching and hiccup still persists though less in frequency and duration. Mentally still clear. Taking water to which glucose is added without his knowledge.'

Jatin Das died on 13 September 1929, Friday, at the lap of his brother Kiron Das at 1.00 pm. The bier was carried on shoulders by Dr. Gopi Chand Bhargava, Dr. Muhammad Alam, Dr. Saifuddin Kitchlew, Sardar Sardul Singh Caveseer, Dr. Benarasi Das, Sardar Kishan Singh(Bhagat Singh's father) and Lala Duni Chand.

It is reported that Das used to sing Rabindranath Tagore's poem “Ekla chalo re,” in his final days. On Das's death, Subhas gave Rs 600 to bring his body from Lahore to Calcutta and sent telegrams to all intermediate to arrange for ice, water and other conveniences for those accompanying the body.

Durgawati Devi led the funeral procession, which went from Lahore to Calcutta by train. Sardar Kishan Singh, Bhagat Singh’s father, and Kiron Das, Jatin Das's younger brother accompanied the coffin. Thousands of people rushed to the railway stations to pay homage to Das. A two-mile long procession in Calcutta carried the coffin to the cremation ground. Subhas Chandra Bose (along with Smt. Basanti Devi -widow of C.R. Das, Mrs Kamla Nehru, Dr B.C. Roy, Shayama Prasad Mukerji and Maulvi Shamasuddin) received the coffin of Das at Howrah railway station. Bose led the funeral procession to the cremation ground.

The hunger strike of Das in prison was a crucial moment in the resistance against illegal detentions.

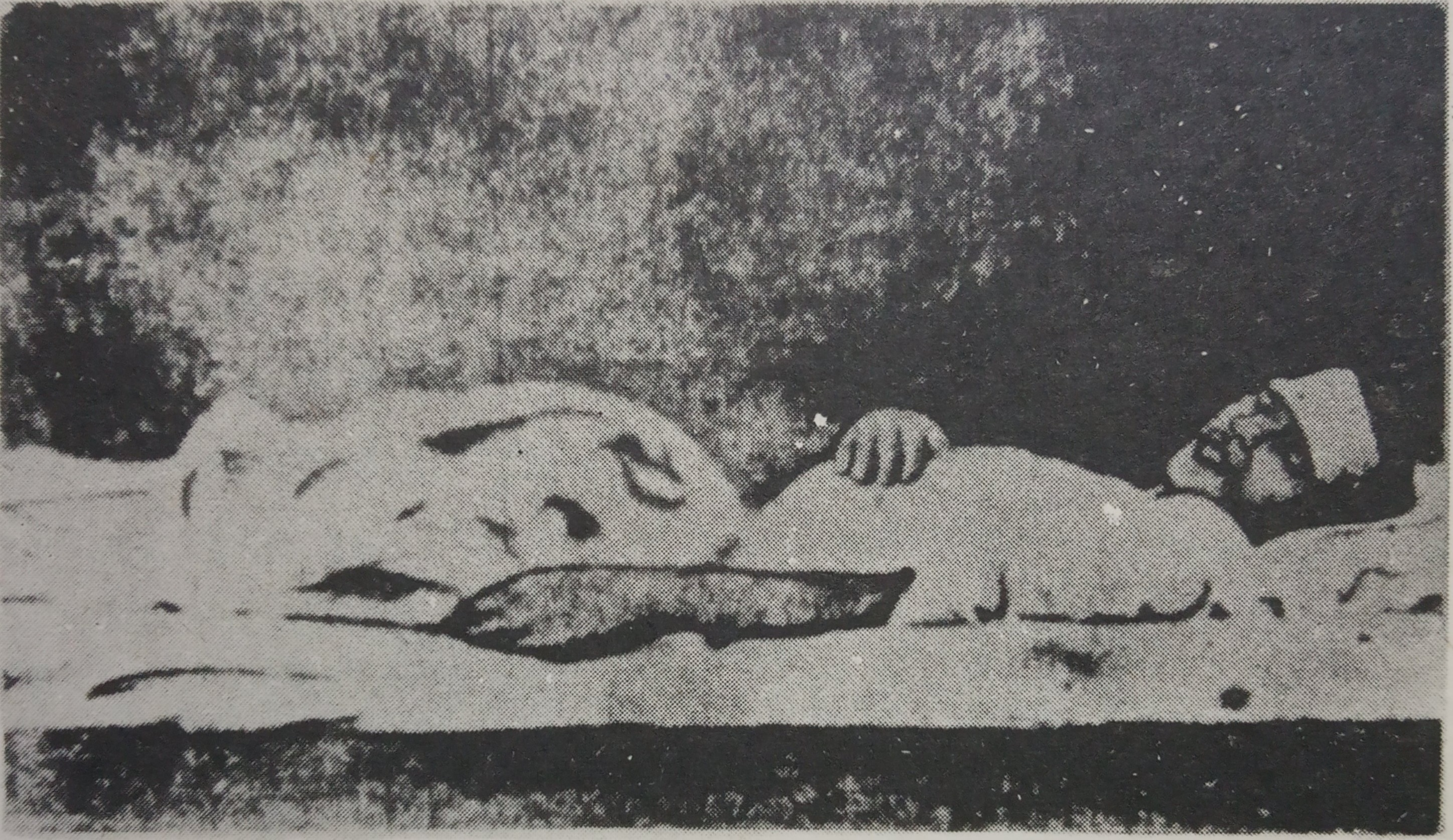
Das on his death bed in 1929

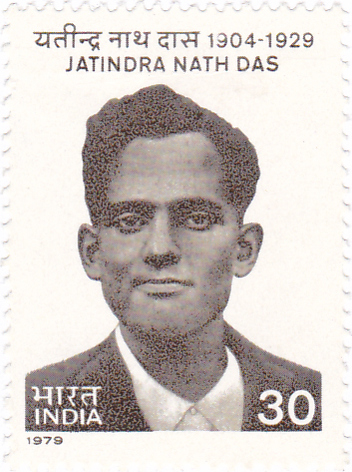
Das on a 1979 post-stamp of India

After his death, the Viceroy informed London that "Mr. Das of the Conspiracy Case, who was on hunger strike, died this afternoon at 1 p.m. Last night, five of the hunger strikers gave up their hunger strike. So, there are only Bhagat Singh and Batukeshwar Dutt who are on strike."

Tributes were paid by almost every leader in the country. Mohammad Alam and Gopi Chand Bhargava resigned from the Punjab Legislative Council in protest. Motilal Nehru proposed the adjournment of the Central Assembly that was in session as a censure against the inhumanity shown against the Lahore prisoners. The censure motion was carried by 55 votes against 47. Jawaharlal Nehru said "Another name has been added to the long and splendid roll of Indian martyrs. Let us bow our heads and pray for strength to act to carry on the struggle, however long it may be and whatever consequences, till the victory is ours".

Prosecution Lawyer Carden Noad said:

"I desire on behalf of us all to express sincere regret and genuine sorrow which we feel on account of the untimely death of Jatinder Nath Das. There are qualities which compel admiration of all men alike and the prominent among them are qualities of courage and constancy in pursuit of an ideal. Although we do not share the ideals which he followed, we can not but admire the unwavering fortitude and firmness of the purpose he displayed".

Bose described Das as the "young Dadhichi of India", referring to the well known mythological yogi Dadhichi who sacrificed his life for the sake of killing a demon.

Later that year, Jawaharlal Nehru began his famous Presidential Speech at Lahore Congress (on 29, December 1929) with a homage to Jatin Das along with Burmese freedom fighter Vizaya

In honour of Jatin Das Tagore wrote:

"All meanness is devoured by the fire of your anger—

O God, give us strength, have mercy on your devotees.

Sweep away, Almighty, what is false and petty—

May death be dwarfed by the ecstasy of life.

By churning the depths of suffering will be found immortality,

Those who fear death will be freed of their terror.

Your resplendent scorching power will melt and let flow

Freed of the chain of stones, a stream of sacrifice"

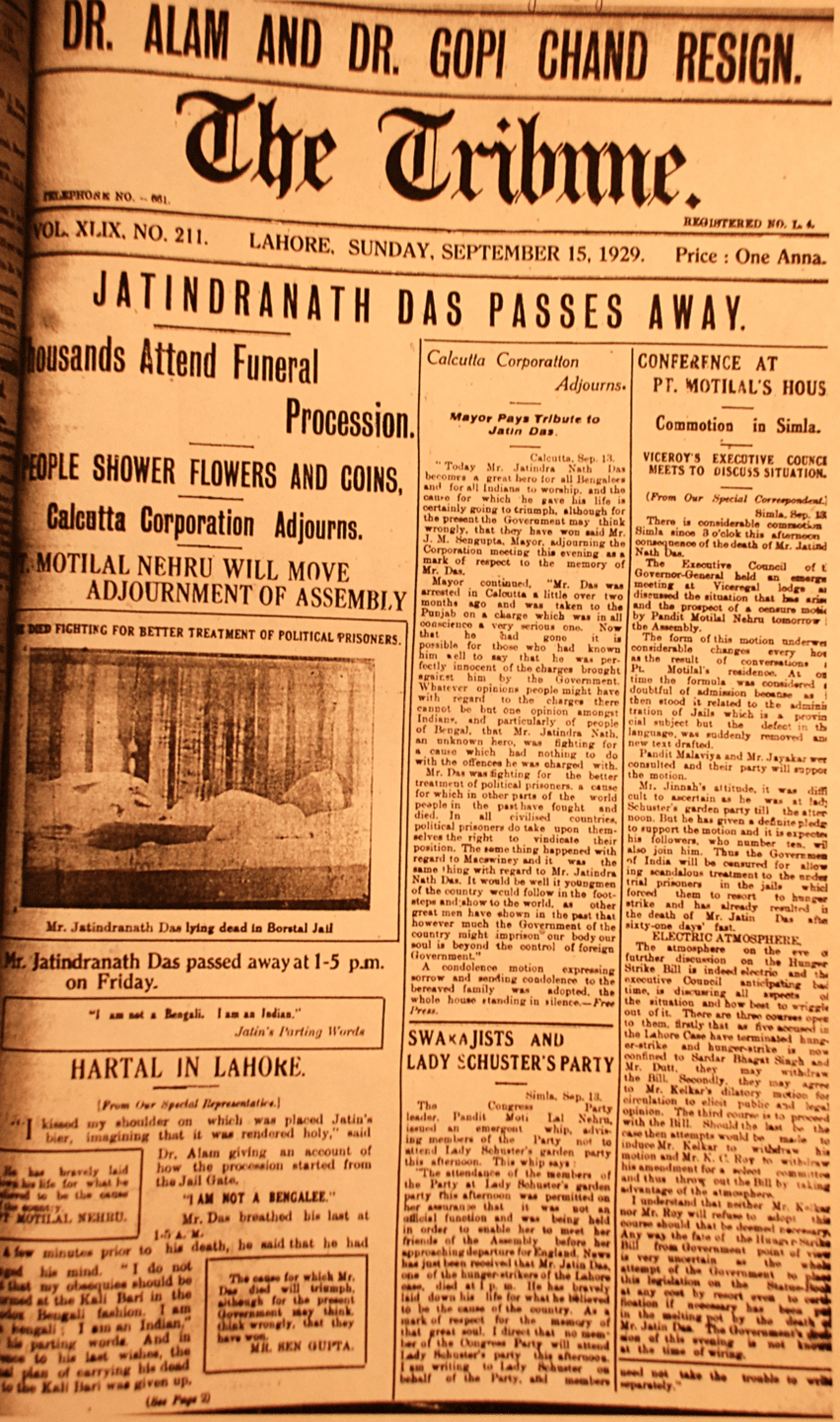
Newspaper of The Tribune which showed that Das died, 1929

The Jatin Das Park metro station on the Kolkata Metro is named after him.

== Popular culture ==
Tamil writer Ki. Rajanarayanan's semi-historical novel Gopallapurathu Makkal (1989) makes a reference to Das.

In the 2002 film The Legend of Bhagat Singh, the character of Das was played by Amitabh Bhattacharjee. A 35-minute documentary film titled Immortal Martyr Jatin Das was released in 2009.

== See also ==
- Ekla chalo re
- Batukeshwar Dutt
- Pritilata Waddedar
- Potti Sreeramulu
- Thileepan
- Bhagat Singh
- Chandra Shekhar Azad
- Bagha Jatin
