= Amiya Tagore =

- Born: 12 February 1908; Calcutta
- Died: 13 November 1986
- Genres: Rabindra Sangeet
- Occupation: Singer
- Instrument: vocal

Amiya Tagore (née Roy (12 February 1908 – 13 November 1986) was a Bengali Rabindra Sangeet singer. She was amongst the few singers to learn directly from Rabindranath Tagore. She played the role of Pramada in Tagore's dance drama Mayar Khela which was directed by the composer himself. Later she became a member of the Tagore family through her marriage to Tagore's elder brother's grandson.

== Early life ==
The daughter of Surendranath Roy, barrister, she was born at Calcutta on 12 February 1908, and was educated at Bethune School and Bethune College. She had early training in music from a Muslim ostad and subsequently had training in classical music from Nagendra Kishore Bandopadhayay. She learnt Rabindra Sangeet directly from the poet himself. She had such a melodius voice that the poet used to teach her the most difficult tunes. She was married to Hridindranath Tagore.

== Later life ==
Amiya Tagore used to give public performance after her wedding only on Tagore's birthdays. She sang 'E parabase rabe ke hay' for Satyajit Ray in the film Kanchenjungha (1962). Towards the end of her life, in 1979, she enthralled the audience with her rendering of songs at Rabindra Sadan in Calcutta. Sailajaranjan Majumdar, the universal teacher of music at Santiniketan writes in his memoirs that once when he expressed his desire to go to Calcutta to learn the song Mori lo mori amay banshite dekechhe ke from Amiya Tagore.
