= Eden Mohila College =

Public women's college in Dhaka, Bangladesh

- ইডেন মহিলা কলেজ
- Crest of Eden Mohila College
- Other names: Eden College; EMC
- Former names: Dhaka Female School; Eden Girls School; Eden Girls High School and Higher Secondary College; Eden Girls College
- Type: Public
- Established: 1873; 153 years ago
- Founder: Shuvashadhini Shava
- Parent institution: Dhaka Central University
- Chancellor: President of Bangladesh
- Vice-Chancellor: Md. Lutfor Rahaman
- Principal: Shamchun Nahar
- Students: 35,000+
- Location: Dhaka, Bangladesh; 23.727842°N 90.3863622°E
- Campus: 7.3 hectares (18 acres); Urban
- Website: emc.edu.bd

Eden Mohila College (Dhaka Central University Attached: Eden Mohila College, Dhaka), also known as Eden College, is a women's college located in Azimpur, Dhaka, Bangladesh. It was established in 1873 in the Farashganj area of Dhaka. In 1878 it was named after Ashley Eden, Lieutenant Governor of Bengal. The college moved to its present premises in 1963. It was affiliated with the University of Dhaka from February 2017 to January 2025. It offers honours and master's programs under Dhaka Central University.

== History ==
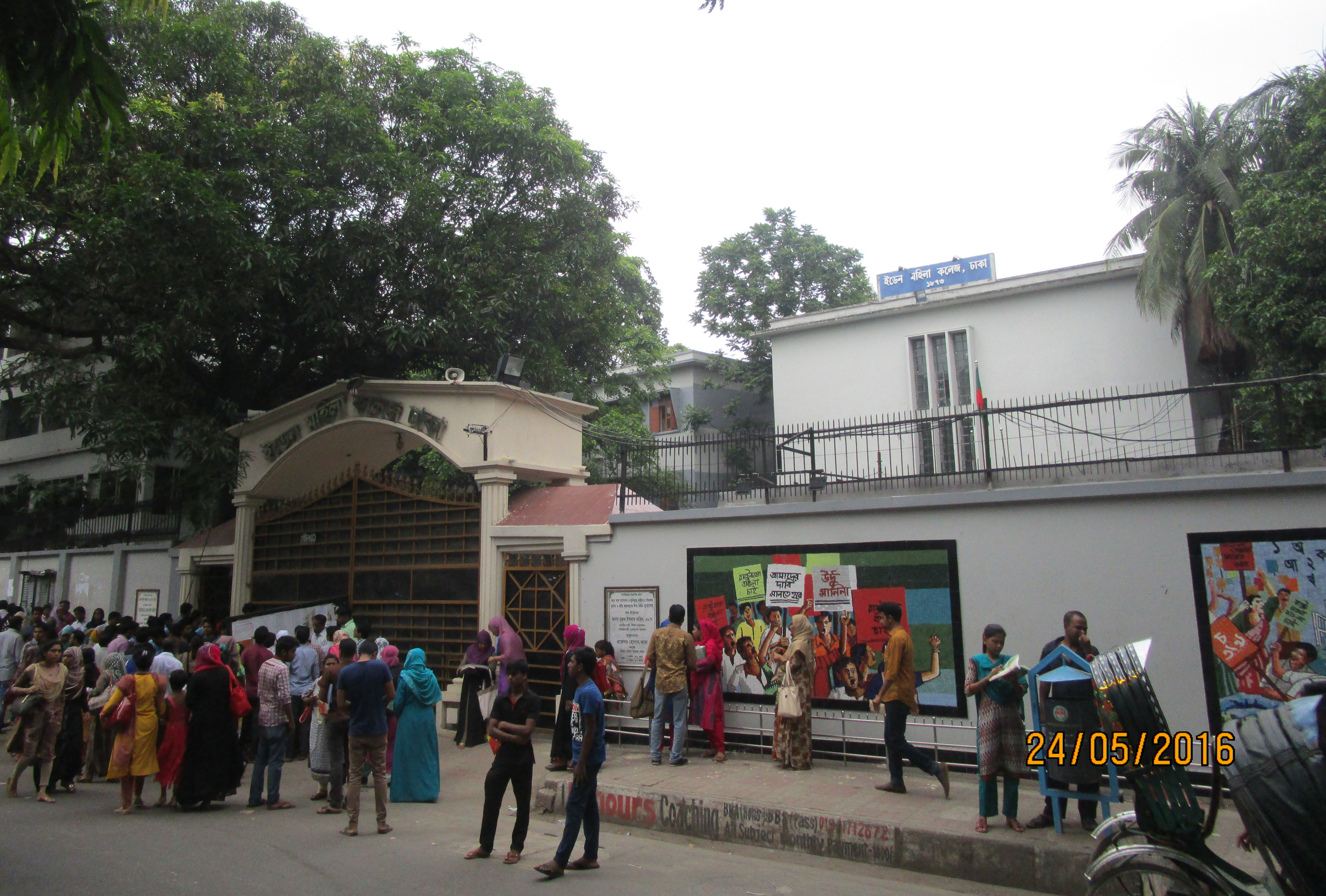
Entrance of the college

In 1873, the Shubhaswadhini Sabha established a school at Farashganj for the education of Brahmo girls. In 1878, Dhaka Female School was established by merging another girls school with this school. In the same year, the school was converted into a government school and renamed Eden Girls' School. After coming under government management, the school was shifted to Laxmibazar. After 1897 the school was shifted to Sadarghat. In 1926, the school was converted into a college and renamed Eden Girls' High School and Higher Secondary College. The college was shifted again to Abdul Gani Road when AK Fazlul Haque was the Education Minister of Bengal. After the establishment of Pakistan, the college was shifted to Curzon Hall for administrative reasons, but in 1958, the college was merged with Kamrunnesa School and moved to Tikatuli where Kamrunnesa School had its campus. In 1962, the higher education section of Eden College was shifted to its present location and the following year, the Boxibazar branch of the college started as the Government Girls College, now known as Begum Badrunnesa Government Girls' College. Then Eden Girls College was named Eden Mohila College.

== Controversy ==
On 22 September 2022, Chhatra League's Eden College branch vice-president Jannatul Ferdous raised allegations of various irregularities against president Tamanna Jasmine Riva and general secretary Razia Sultana to the media. So on the night of 24 September, Riva and Razia's team attacked her in the college area. When Jannat, the victim of torture, threatened to commit suicide, the enraged attackers fled the college at night.

In a press conference, 25 leaders of the college threatened to resign if action was not taken against Riva and Razia on afternoon of 25 September. Later, Riva and Razia's supporters clashed with their rival factions on 25 September when they attended a press conference arranged by Riva–Razia. The two groups clashed several times in the college area that day.

College authorities formed a committee on September 25 to investigate the incident. On the same day, the central council of the BCL expelled 16 workers of the Eden College branch based on preliminary evidence and announced the suspension of the branch's activities. On 26 September, the expelled leaders told the media that the central council of the BCL expelled only a section of the branch to systematically suspend the activities of the entire branch by keeping the committee. They alleged that the Riva–Razia group were not expelled despite evidence. The oustees demanded the withdrawal of the eviction order on them. Those expelled from the party planned to go on a hunger strike to demand their demands, but came back from that decision after the assurance of the BCL leaders.

These issues are not new but old in this college. The expelled leaders accused Riva and Razia of extorting hall rooms, corruption and abuse of power and using college girls as prostitutes, but the Central Committee of Chhatra League denied these allegations. A former student of the college, Liza Akhtar Hossain, claimed on Facebook that the college forced female students to become political activists.

In response, the college branch of Chhatra Dal called for resistance against the Chhatra League to make the campus safe for female students. The Central Women's Division of Bangladesh Jamaat-e-Islami in a statement condemned the incident and called upon the government to restore the campus environment. Supriya Bhattacharya, the professor of the college, indirectly denied the allegation that Eden College was under the control of BCL. She sees the incident as the students' fault and feels counseling them will solve the problem.

In response to the incident, Sultana Kamal wrote in a column in Prothom Alo, "Eden College Chhatra League leadership is not alone responsible for this situation. The Central Chhatra League, which is responsible for managing Eden College Chhatra League, the leadership of Awami League, which is responsible for managing that Chhatra League—all have responsibility here. Everyone has to fulfill their respective responsibilities. No. Instead, everyone is condoning this unaccountable lawlessness. Sadly, no one is concerned about the destruction of our children's future." Professor Tanjim Uddin Khan of the Department of International Relations of Dhaka University blamed the negligence of the college authorities for this incident.

On 28 September, Jannatul Ferdausi filed a case against the torturers in the Dhaka Metropolitan Court.

== Courses ==
- Honours degree
- Master's degree

== Faculties ==
Faculty of Arts & Social Science

- Department of Bangla
- Department of English
- Department of History
- Department of Islamic History & Culture
- Department of Philosophy
- Department of Islamic Studies
- Department of Economics
- Department of Political Science
- Department of Sociology
- Department of Social Work

Faculty of Science

- Department of Chemistry
- Department of Physics
- Department of Botany
- Department of Zoology
- Department of Statistics
- Department of Mathematics
- Department of Geography and Environmental Science
- Department of Psychology

Faculty of Business Studies

- Department of Marketing
- Department of Accounting
- Department of Management
- Department of Finance and Banking

== Notable alumni ==
- Sheikh Hasina, former Prime Minister of Bangladesh
- Pritilata Waddedar, revolutionary nationalist
- Amena Begum, politician
- Monira Rahman, human rights activist
- Ferdousi Mazumder, actress
- Matia Chowdhury, politician
- Dilara Zaman, actress
- Tahrunessa Abdullah
- Parveen Sultana Diti
- Suhasini Ganguly, freedom fighter
- Rani Hamid
- Humaira Himu
- Monowara Islam
- Rawshan Jamil
- Kazi Khaleda Khatun, language activist
- Runa Khan
- Flora Zaibun Majid
- Kamrun Nahar, soil scientist and environmentalist
- Shamima Nazneen
- Munni Saha
- Shanta Jahan
- Alina Sultana
- Tasnuva Tisha, actress and model
- Farida Yasmin (journalist)
- Zuena Aziz
- Nipun Roy Chowdhury
- Rabia Bhuiyan
- Hasina Mumtaz
- Helen Zerin Khan

== Notable faculty ==
- Akhtar Imam - from the mid-1940s until 1956.
- Siddika Kabir
- Khodeja Khatun - a writer, and professor of Bangla from 1960 to 1968, who became the college principal in 1972.

== See also ==
- List of colleges under University of Dhaka
- Muminunnesa Women's College
- Pakundia Adarsha Mohila College
