= Pritilata Waddedar =

Bengali revolutionary (1911–1932)

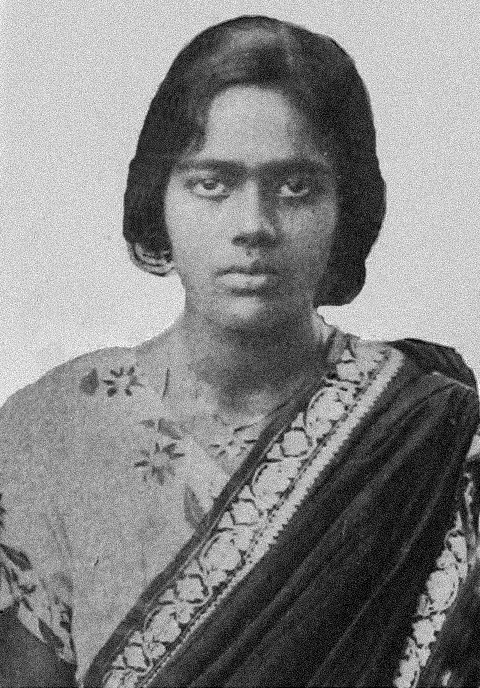
- Born: 5 May 1911; Patiya, Eastern Bengal and Assam, British India (now in Chittagong Division, Bangladesh)
- Died: 24 September 1932 (aged 21); Chittagong, Bengal Province, British India (now Chittagong, Bangladesh)
- Cause of death: Suicide by consuming potassium cyanide
- Other name: Rani (nickname)
- Education: Dr. Khastagir Government Girls' High School, Eden Mohila College, Bethune College
- Occupation: School teacher
- Known for: Pahartali European Club attack (1932)
- Parents: Jagabandhu Waddedar (father); Pratibha Devi (mother)

Signature
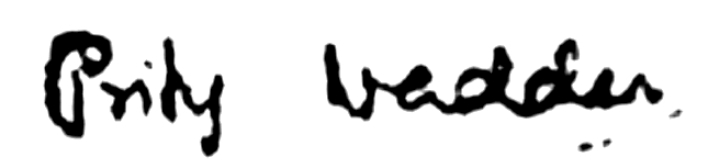

Pritilata Waddedar (5 May 1911 – 24 September 1932) was a Bengali revolutionary nationalist from Chittagong (now Bangladesh) who was influential in the Indian independence movement. She is often praised as "Bengal's first woman martyr".

After completing her education from Dr. Khastagir Government Girls' High School in Chittagong and Eden Mohila College in Dhaka, Pritilata graduated in philosophy from the Bethune College in Calcutta. She worked as a school teacher for sometime before becoming part of the Indian Independence movement. In 1932, she joined a revolutionary group headed by Surya Sen. In September 1932, she led a group of revolutionaries in an armed attack on the Pahartali European Club. The revolutionaries torched the club and shot at it later, and one person was killed and eleven people were injured in the attack. After being cornered by the colonial police, Pritilata committed suicide by consuming potassium cyanide as planned earlier.

== Early life ==
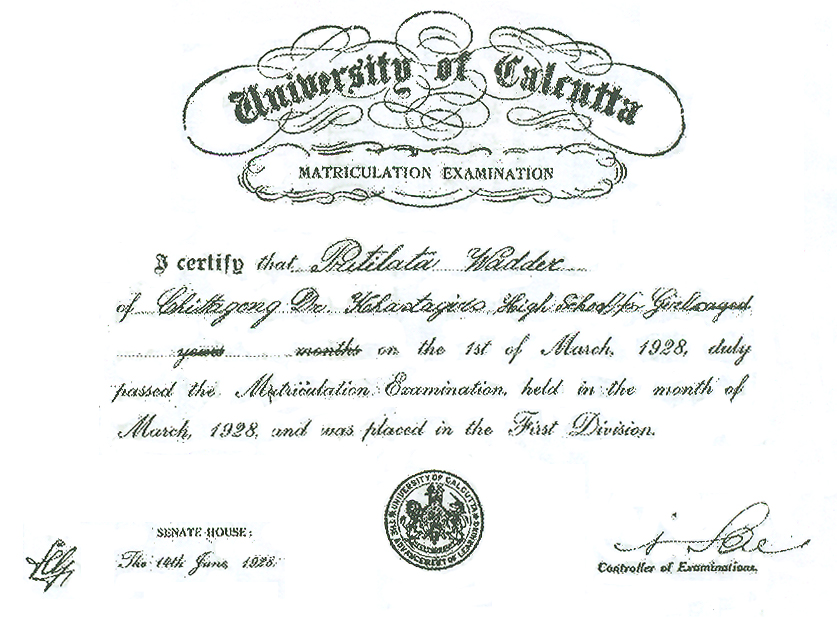
Matriculation examination certificate of Pritilata

Pritilata Waddedar was born in a middle-class Bengali family on 5 May 1911 in Dhalghat village in Patiya upazila of Chittagong (in present day Bangladesh). The family originally held the surname Dasgupta; Waddedar was a title conferred to an ancestor of the family. Her father Jagabandhu Waddedar was a clerk in the Chittagong municipality, and her mother Pratibhamayi Devi was a housewife. Pritilata was the second of six children, and had an elder brother Madhusduan, and four younger siblings–Kanaklata, Shantilata, Ashalata and Santosh. She was nicknamed Rani. Jagabandhu tried to arrange the best possible education for his children, and got Pritilata admitted to the Dr. Khastagir Government Girls' School in Chittagong. Pritilata was a meritorious student in school, and arts and literature were her favourite subjects. A teacher in the school, whom students affectionately used to call Usha Di, used stories of Rani Lakshmibai to inspire nationalism in her students. Kalpana Datta, a classmate of Pritilata, wrote in the biography Chittagong Armoury Raiders– "We had no clear idea in our school days about our future. Then the Rani of Jhansi fired our imagination with her example. Sometimes we used to think of ourselves as fearless...". She passed out of school in 1928 and got admitted to the Eden College in Dhaka in 1929. In the Intermediate examinations, she stood first among all students who appeared in that year's examination from the Dhaka Board. As a student in Eden College, she participated in various social activities. She joined the group Sree Sangha, headed by Leela Nag, under the banner Deepali Sangha (Dipali Sangha).

Pritilata graduated in philosophy with a distinction from the Bethune College in Calcutta. However, her degree was withheld by the administration of the Calcutta University. In 2012, she (and Bina Das) were conferred their certificates posthumously. After completing her education in Calcutta, Pritilata returned to Chittagong. In Chittagong, she took up the job of headmistress at a local English medium secondary school called Nandankanan Aparnacharan School.

== Revolutionary activities ==
=== Joining Surya Sen's group ===
"Pritilata was young and courageous. She would work with a lot of zeal and was determined to drive the British away."

— Binod Bihari Chowdhury, a contemporary revolutionary

As Pritilata joined the Indian independence movement, Surya Sen heard of her and wanted her to join their revolutionary group. On 13 June 1932, Pritilata met Surya Sen and Nirmal Sen in their Dhalghat camp. Binod Bihari Chowdhury objected to her participation as women was not allowed to join their group. However, Pritalata was allowed to join the group because the revolutionaries reasoned that women transporting weapons would not attract as much suspicious as men. Pritilata took part in several attacks on telephone and telegraph offices in the region and the capture of the reserve police line. She took the responsibility of supplying explosives to the revolutionaries.

=== Meeting Ramkrishna Biswas ===
Surya Sen and his revolutionary group decided to kill Craig, the inspector general of Chittagong. Ramakrishna Biswas and Kalipada Chakravarty were assigned for this task. However, they mistakenly killed Tarini Mukherjee, the superintendent of police in Chandpur. Ramakrishna Biswas and Kalipada Chakravarty were arrested on 2 December 1930. Biswas was ordered to be hanged and Chakravarty was exiled to the Cellular Jail in the Andaman and Nicobar Islands. The family and friends lacked the amount of money for travel from Chittagong to Alipore Jail in Calcutta. Since at that time Pritilata was staying in Calcutta, she was asked to go to Alipore Jail and meet Biswas before his punishment was carried out. Pritilata used to meet him in the alias of his cousin sister.

=== Pahartali European Club attack (1932) ===
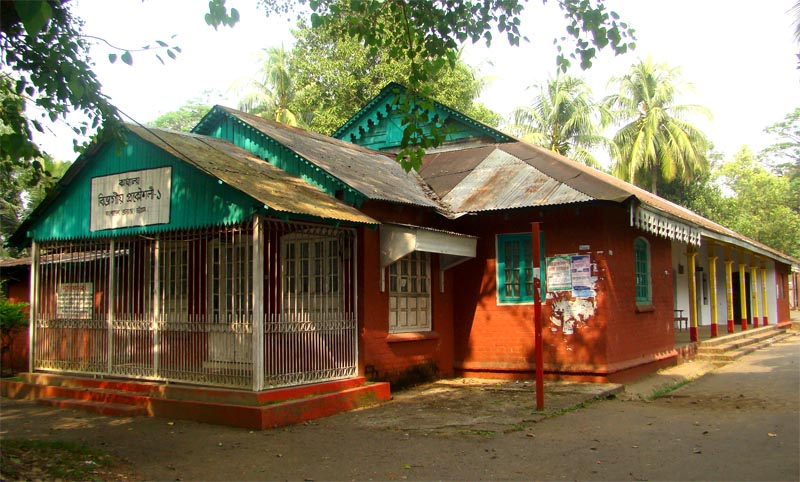
The Pahartali European Club (shown here in 2010) was torched by the group of revolutionaries.

In 1932, Surya Sen planned an attack on the Pahartali European Club which had a signboard that read "Dogs and Indians not allowed". Sen decided to appoint a woman leader for the mission. As Kalpana Datta was arrested prior to the planned attack, Pritilata was assigned the leadership of the group. Pritilata went to Kotowali sea side for arms training and the plan of their attack was finalised there. It was decided to attack the club on 24 September 1932, and the members of the group were given potassium cyanide, to be swallowed to commit suicide if they were caught.

On the day of the attack, Pritilata dressed herself as a Punjabi male. Her associates Kalishankar Dey, Bireshwar Roy, Prafulla Das, Shanti Chakraborty wore dhoti and shirt. Mahendra Chowdhury, Sushil Dey and Panna Sen wore lungi and shirt. The group reached the club at around 10:45 pm to launch their attack, and divided themselves into three separate groups. There were around 40 people inside the club during the attack. The building was set on fire before the armed group started shooting into it. A few armed police officers, who were present at the club, returned fire. Pritilata was shot and incurred a single bullet wound. According to the police report, one woman was killed, and four men and seven women were injured in the attack.

== Death ==
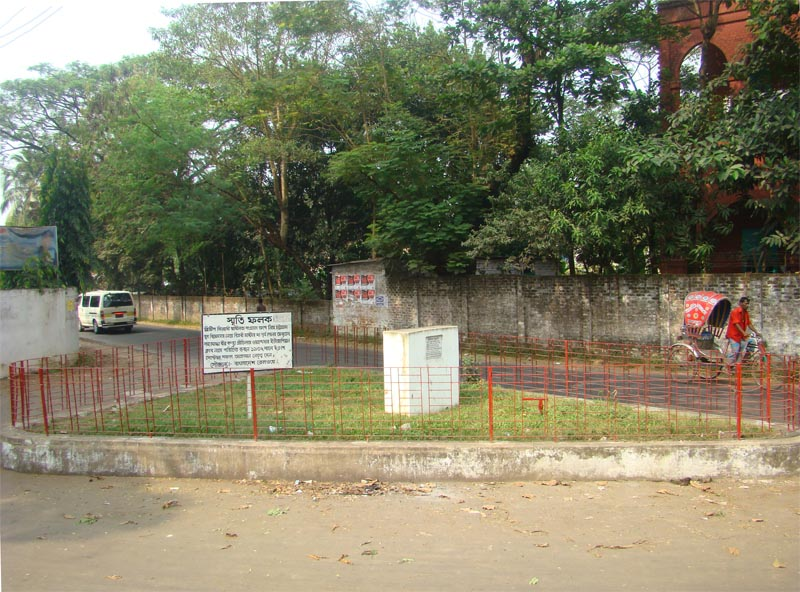
There is a plaque dedicated to Pritilata at the place where she committed suicide.

An injured Pritilata was trapped by the colonial police, and she consumed potassium cyanide to evade capture. The police found her body the next day, and found a photograph of Ramkrishna Biswas, some bullets, a whistle, some leaflets, and a draft plan of the attack. She had a suicide note with her, where she had penned down the objectives of the Indian Republican Army of Chittagong branch. In the letter, along with the names of Surya Sen and Nirmal Sen, she had also mentioned about her experience of meeting Ramkrishna Biswas in the Alipore Jail.

During the post-mortem examination, it was found that the bullet injury was not life threatening and her cause of death was ruled as cyanide poisoning. The chief secretary of Bengal sent a report to British authorities in London. In the report it was written that Pritilata:

had been closely associated with, if not actually the mistress of, the terrorist Biswas who was hanged for the murder of Inspector Tarini Mukherjee, and some reports indicate that she was the wife of Nirmal Sen who was killed while attempting to evade arrest at Dhalghat, where Captain Cameron fell.

== Influence and legacy ==
Bangladeshi writer Selina Hossain calls Pritilata an ideal for every woman. The Birkannya Pritilata Trust (Brave lady Pritilata Trust) was established to promote the life and achievements of her, and commemorates her birthday annually. In an interview, the British journalist and activist, Ash Sarkar, claimed to be Waddedar's great-grandniece.

In 2012, a bronze sculpture of Pritilata Waddedar was erected in front of the Pahartali Railway School, adjacent to the Pahartali European Club. The last section of the Sahid Abdus Sabur Road leading to Mukunda Ram Hat of Boalkhali upazila in Chattogram has been named as Pritilata Waddedar Road. Educational institutions named after her include Pritilata Waddedar Mahavidyalaya in Panikhali, Pritilata Waddedar Primary School in Chattogram, and Khantura Pritilata Shiksha Niketan schools in Gobardanga. There are halls and buildings named after her at Jahangirnagar University, Kalyani Government Engineering College, National Institute of Technology, Durgapur, and University of Chittagong.

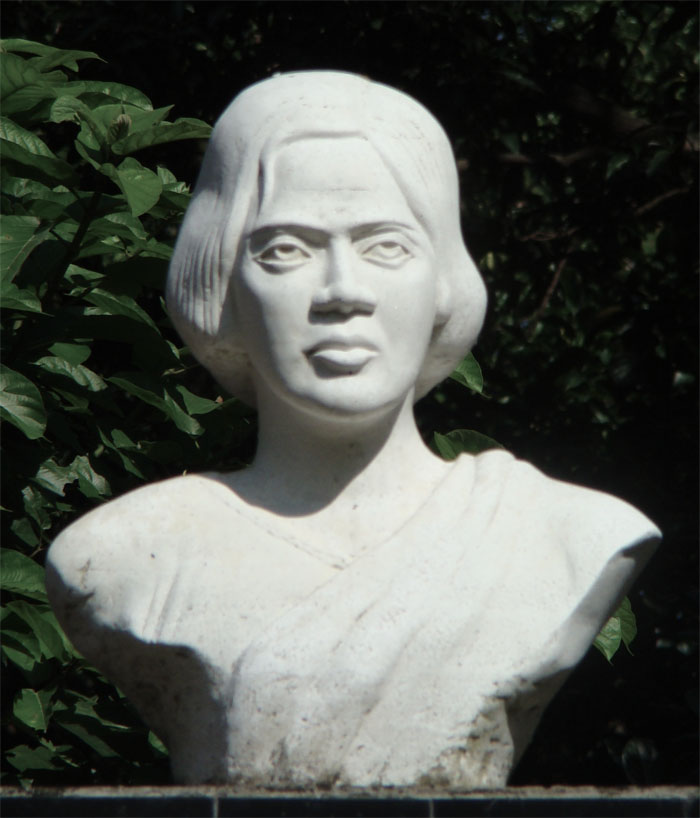
Bust at Pritilata Waddedar primary school, Chattogram

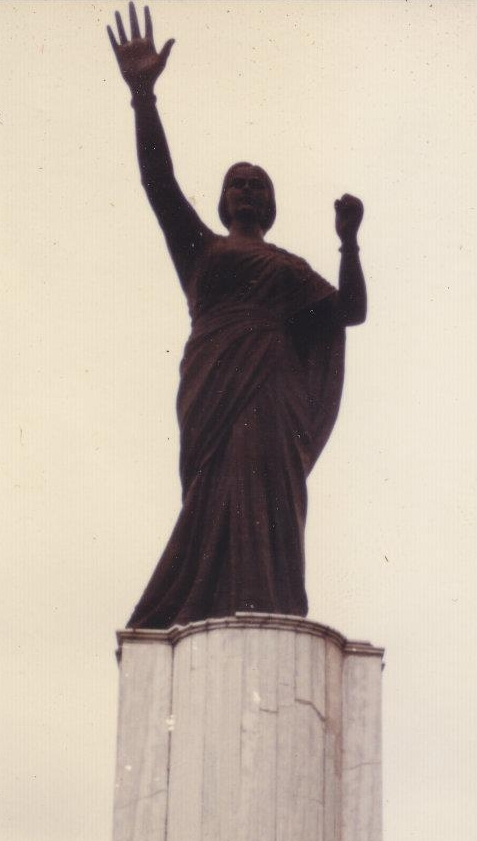
Statue at Maidan, Kolkata

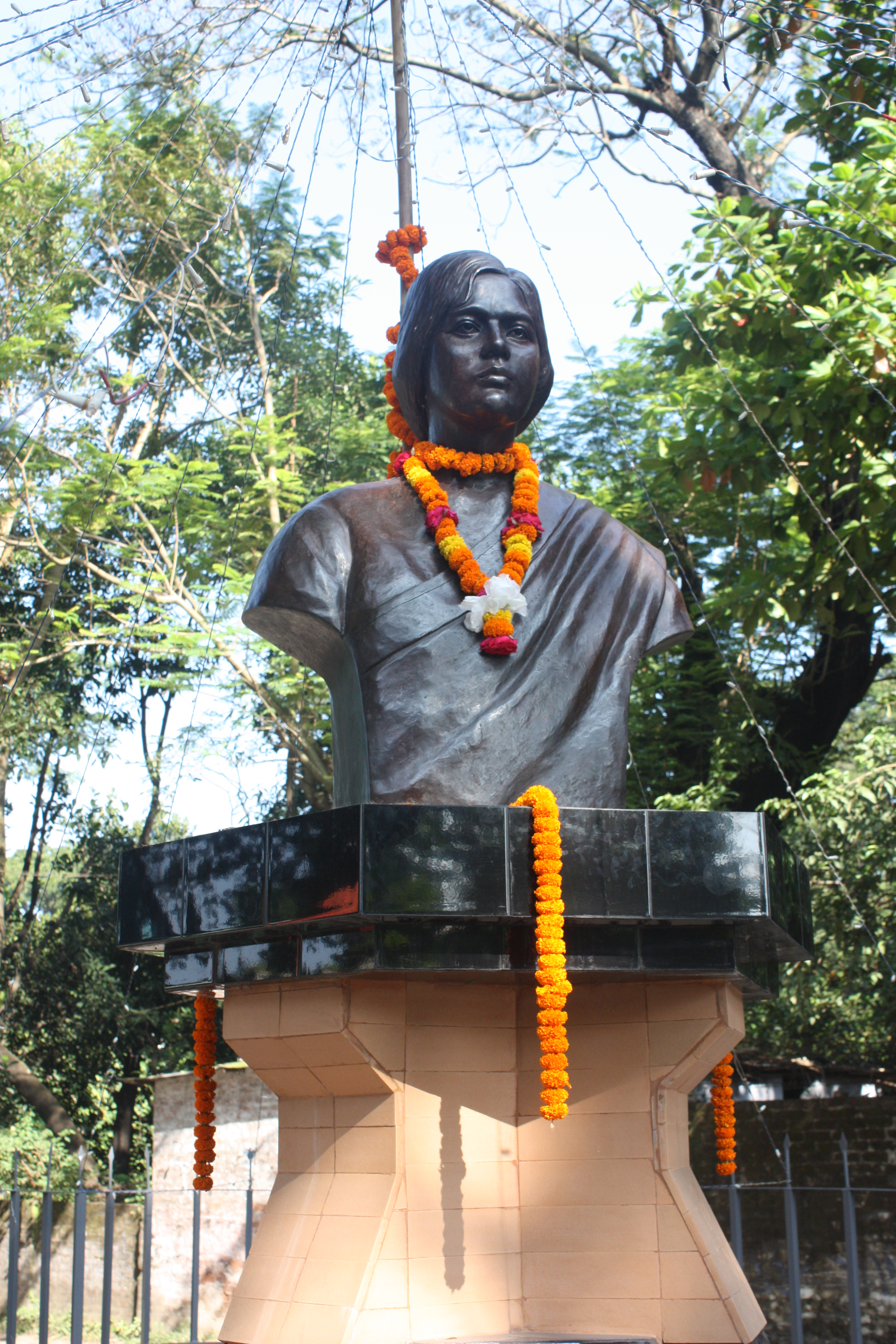
Bust at the place of her death

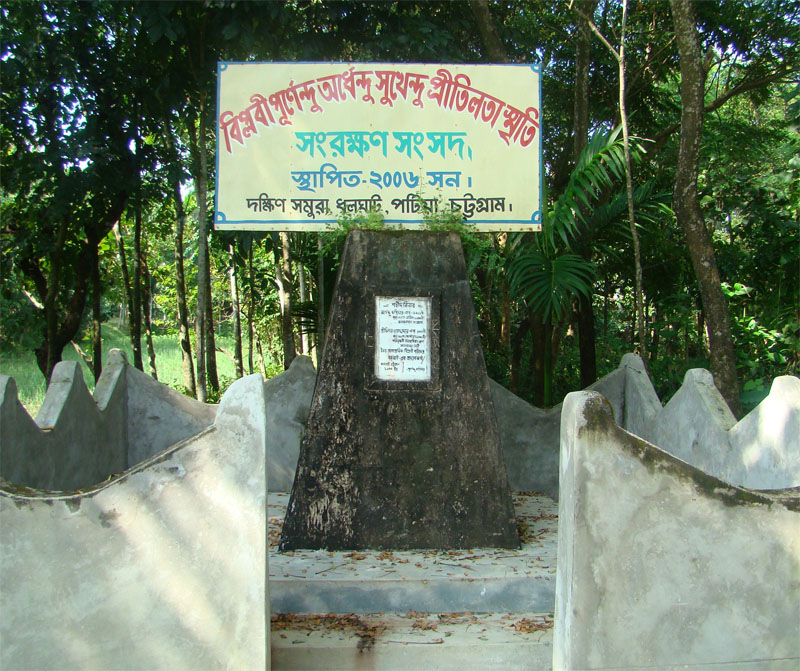
Pritilata Shohid Minar

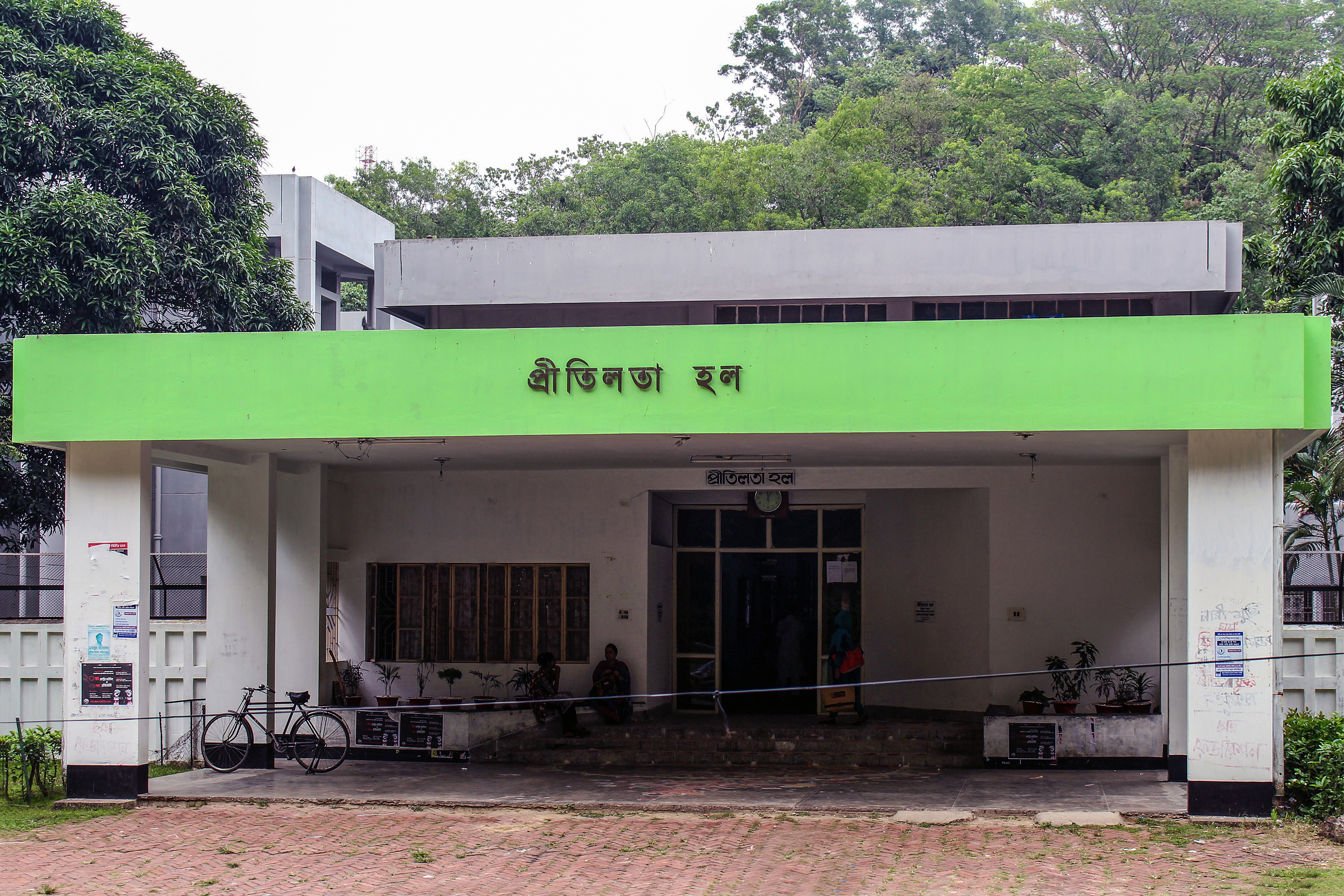
Pritilata Hall, University of Chittagong

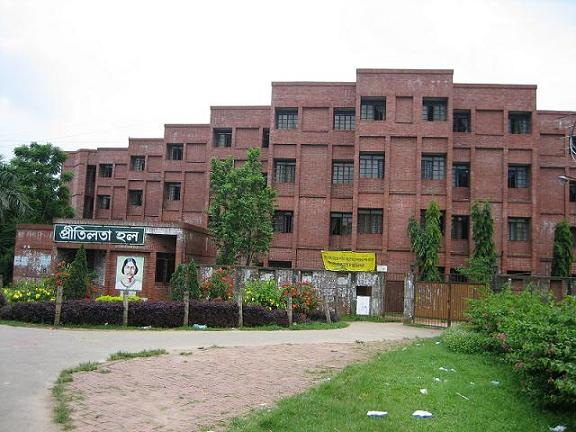
Pritilata Hall, Jahangirnagar University

=== In popular media ===
- The 2010 Hindi film Khelein Hum Jee Jaan Sey was based on the Chittagong Uprising, in which Vishakha Singh played the character of Pritilata.
- In the 2012 Hindi film Chittagong, Vega Tamotia played the role of Pritilata.
- In 2018, Kiran Sonia Sawar delivered a monologue, written by Tanika Gupta, in Pritilata, a short film in the BBC series Snatches: Moment's From Women's Lives to mark the hundredth anniversary of women's suffrage.
- A Bangladeshi film titled Pritilata starring Pori Moni and based on the life of Pritilata is under production.

== See also ==
- Jatindra Nath Das – Indian revolutionary (1904–1929)
