= Kalyani Das =

Indian freedom fighter (1907–1983)

- কল্যাণী দাস
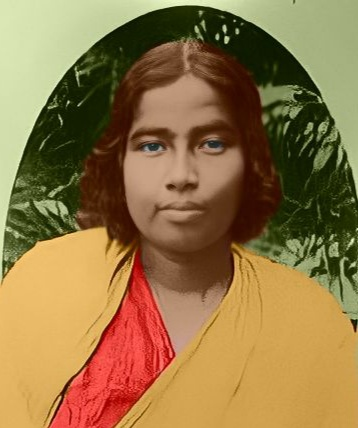
- Das in 1938
- Born: May 28, 1907; Krishnanagar, Bengal, British India (now West Bengal, India)
- Died: February 16, 1983 (aged 75); Rishikesh, Uttar Pradesh, India
- Organization(s): Jugantar and Indian National Congress
- Movement: Indian Independence movement
- Family: Bina Das (sister)

Kalyani Das (1907–1983) was an Indian revolutionary and nationalist from Bengal.

== Education ==
She was a student of Ravenshaw Collegiate School, Cuttack. Das finished her Bachelor of Arts degree in 1928.

== Participation in India's freedom struggle ==
Das was a member of Chhatri Sangha, a semi-revolutionary organisation for women in Kolkata. In 1930, she led a protest of female students against Governor of Bengal. She was arrested for her anti-governor activity in 1932. Her classmate Kamala Das Gupta was arrested at the same time.

== Death ==
Das died on 16 February 1983.

== Works ==
She edited a book called Bengal Speaks (published in 1944), and dedicated it to her sister Bina Das.
