= Bimal Pratibha Devi =

Indian freedom fighter (1901–1978)

Bimal Pratibha Devi (1901 – 1978) was a trade union leader and a freedom fighter from West Bengal. She worked with coal mine labourers. She left Calcutta (now Kolkata) and went to Asansol to work with the mine workers. She was known as Mathaji and Hunterwali.

Devi was born in Cuttack, Odisha into an affluent family in December 1901. She married Charuchandra Banerjee, a doctor. She was inspired by her father, Surendranath Mukherjee, and joined the Swadeshi movement. In 1921, she joined Nari Karmamandir, which trained women in nationalist activities. In 1927, she became the president of the Naujawan Bharat Sabha, a left-wing revolutionary group started by Bhagat Singh. In 1928, she came out into the open and joined the Congress party. In support of the Civil Disobedience Movement, she started Nari Satyagraha Samiti in 1930.

She was imprisoned many times. Her first long stint was from 1931 to 1938. She wrote two books in prison, Notun Diner Alo and Aguner Phulki.

A road has been built in her name in Dhakeshwari Suryanagar area, Kuilapur.
