= Bangladesh Council of Scientific and Industrial Research =

Research Organization in Bangladesh

- Logo of BCSIR
- Formation: 16 November 1973; 52 years ago
- Type: Autonomous-Government Organization
- Location: Dhaka, Bangladesh
- Chairman: Dr. Samina Ahmed
- Staff: 1100
- Website: bcsir.gov.bd

Bangladesh Council of Scientific and Industrial Research (BCSIR) (Bengali: বাংলাদেশ বিজ্ঞান ও শিল্প গবেষণা পরিষদ) is a scientific research organization and regulatory body of Bangladesh. Its main objective is to pursue scientific research for the betterment of the Bangladeshi people. It was established on 16 November 1973.

== History ==
BCSIR traces its roots back to the days of East Pakistan. East Regional Laboratories of Pakistan Council of Scientific and Industrial Research (PCSIR) was established in Dhaka in 1955. Subsequently, PCSIR laboratories were established in Rajshahi (1965) and in Chittagong (1967). After the independence of Bangladesh in 1971, BCSIR was established by a resolution of the Government of the People's Republic of Bangladesh which subsequently was reconstituted as the Bangladesh Council of Scientific and Industrial Research through a Presidential Ordinance namely Ordinance No. (V) of 1978.

== Gallery ==
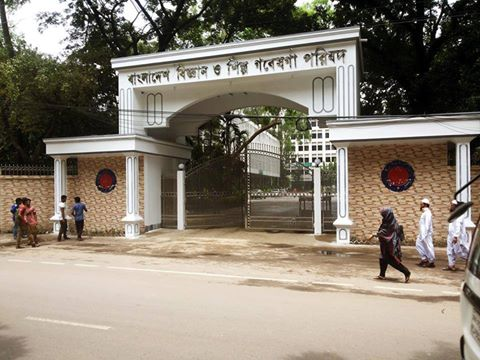
BCSIR

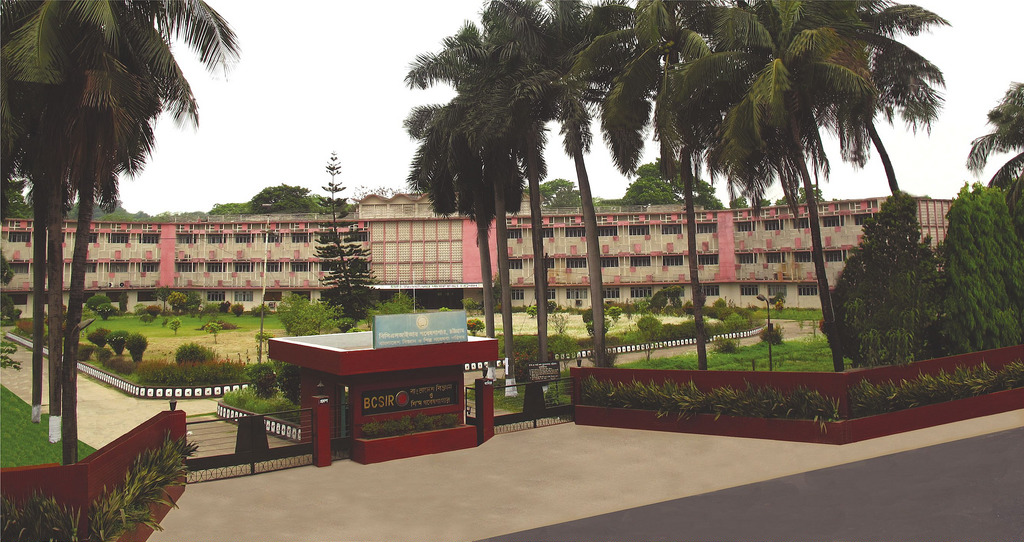
BCSIR_Chittagong

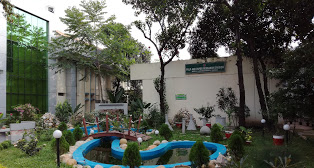
Pulp and Paper Research Division
