= Ekla Chalo Re =

1905 Bengali song by Rabindranath Tagore

"Ekla Cholo Re"

Song
- Language: Bengali
- Published: September 1905
- Genre: Rabindra Sangeet
- Songwriter: Rabindranath Tagore
- Composer: Rabindranath Tagore

"Ekla Chôlo Re"
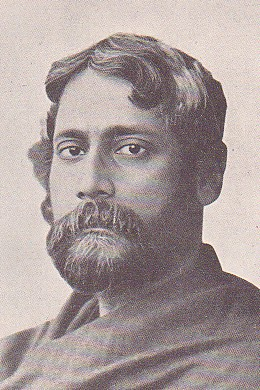
- Tagore c. 1905, the year he wrote "Akla Cholo Re"

Single by Rabindranath Tagore

from the album Record no 357
- Released: sometime between 1905 and 1908
- Label: H. Bose Swadeshi Records
- Songwriter: Rabindranath Tagore
- This album is now lost.

Jôdi Tor Dak Shune Keu Na Ase Tôbe Ekla Chôlo Re ("If no one responds to your call, then go your own way alone"), commonly known as Ekla Chôlo Re, is a Bengali patriotic song written by Rabindranath Tagore in 1905.

Originally titled as "EKLA", the song was first published in the September 1905 issue of Bhandar magazine. It was based and influenced by the Vaishnavite song Harinaam Diye Jagat Matale Amar Ekla Nitai Re, which was a popular Bengali Kirtan song of Dhapkirtan or Manoharshahi gharana praising Nityananda, disciple of Chaitanya Mahaprabhu. Ekla Chalo Re was incorporated in the "Swadesh" (Homeland) section of Tagore's lyrical anthology Gitabitan.

The song exhorts the listener to continue their journey, despite abandonment or lack of support from others. It is often quoted in the context of sociopolitical change movements and was a favourite of Mahatma Gandhi.

== Lyrics ==
=== Bengali ===
The verses of Ekla Chalo Re read as follows:

যদি তোর ডাক শুনে কেউ না আসে তবে একলা চলো রে।
একলা চলো একলা চলো একলা চলো একলা চলো রে॥

যদি কেউ কথা না কয়, ওরে ওরে ও অভাগা,
যদি সবাই থাকে মুখ ফিরায়ে সবাই করে ভয়—
তবে পরান খুলে
ও তুই মুখ ফুটে তোর মনের কথা একলা বলো রে॥

যদি সবাই ফিরে যায়, ওরে ওরে ও অভাগা,
যদি গহন পথে যাবার কালে কেউ ফিরে না চায়—
তবে পথের কাঁটা
ও তুই রক্তমাখা চরণতলে একলা দলো রে॥

যদি আলো না ধরে, ওরে ওরে ও অভাগা,
যদি ঝড়-বাদলে আঁধার রাতে দুয়ার দেয় ঘরে—
তবে বজ্রানলে
আপন বুকের পাঁজর জ্বালিয়ে নিয়ে একলা জ্বলো রে॥

=== Roman transliteration ===
Jodi tor d'ak shune keu na ashe tôbe êkla chôlo re.
Jodi tor d'ak shune keu na ashe tôbe êkla chôlo re.
Êkla chôlo, êkla chôlo, êkla chôlo, êkla chôlo re.
Jodi tor d'ak shune keu na ashe tôbe êkla chôlo re.

Jodi keu kôtha na kôe, ore ore o ôbhaga,keu kôtha na kôe
Jodi shôbai thake mukh phirae shôbai kôre bhôe, jodi shôbai thake mukh phirae shôbai kôre bhôe—
Tôbe pôran khule
O tui mukh phut'e tor moner kôtha êkla bôlo re.
O tui mukh phut'e tor moner kôtha êkla bôlo re.
Jodi tor d'ak shune keu na ashe tôbe êkla chôlo re.

Jodi shôbai phire jae, ore ore o ôbhaga,shôbai phire jae,
Jodi gôhon pôthe jabar kale keu phire na chae, jôdi gôhon pôthe jabar kale keu phire na chae—
Tôbe pôther kãt'a
O tui rôktomakha chôrontôle êkla dôlo re.
O tui rôktomakha chôrontôle êkla dôlo re.
Jodi tor d'ak shune keu na ashe tôbe êkla chôlo re.

Jodi alo na dhôre, ore ore o ôbhaga,Jodi alo na dhôre
Jodi jhôr-badole adhar rate duar dae ghôre,Jodi jhôr-badole adhar rate duar dae ghôre—
Tôbe bôjranole
Apon buker pãjor jalie nie êkla jôlo re.
Apon buker pãjor jalie nie êkla jôlo re.
Jodi tor d'ak shune keu na ashe tôbe êkla chôlo re.

=== English ===
Walk Alone

If no one responds to your call, then walk alone.
Walk alone, walk alone, walk alone, walk alone.
If no one speaks to you, O unfortunate one,

If everyone turns away and everyone is afraid,
Then open your heart,
And speak your mind aloud, all by yourself.

If everyone turns back, O unfortunate one,
If no one looks back when you walk along the difficult path,
Then crush the thorns along the way

Beneath your blood-stained feet, and walk alone.
If no light appears, O unfortunate one,
If on a dark, stormy night everyone shuts their doors,
Then with the fire of lightning,

Set your own heart ablaze and become your own light.

== History ==
=== Writing ===
"Ekla Chalo Re" was written at Giridih town in modern-day Jharkhand, India. It was one of the 22 protest songs written during the Swadeshi period of Indian freedom movement and along with "Amar Sonar Bangla", it became one of the key songs for the Anti-Partition Movement in Bengal Presidency in 1905.

Titled as "Eka" ("Alone") the song was first published in the September 1905 issue of Bhandar magazine. "Eka" was first included in Tagore's song anthology Baul in 1905. In 1941, it was incorporated into the "Swadesh" ("Homeland") section of Gitabitan, the complete anthology of Tagore's music.

The musical notation of "Ekla Chalo Re" was prepared by Indira Devi, a niece of Tagore. The notation was first published in the April–May 1906 issue of Sangeet-Vignan Prakashika magazine and later incorporated into the 46th volume of Swarabitan, the complete collection of Tagore's musical notations.

=== Recording ===
"Ekla Chalo Re" was first recorded by Rabindranath Tagore sometime between 1905 and 1908. The cylinder record labelled H. Bose Swadeshi Records is now lost. Two other records of the song made by Harendranath Dutta (record no P5270) and Hindustan Party (comprising Amala Dutta, Nandita Devi, Sudhin Dutta and Santidev Ghosh) (record no H 191) are released by Gramophone Company of India and Hindustan Records respectively.

Eminent Rabindra Sangeet singer Suchitra Mitra recorded this song twice, first in 1948 (record no N27823), for the film Sandipan Pathshala, then in 1984 (record no PSPL 1501). There is also a third recording of this song by Suchitra Mitra from the album Rupantori (1988). She also recorded the song for the fourth time, with the sarod being played as background music, by Ustad Amjad Ali Khan, from the album Tribute to Tagore. He never knew that this song will be in school textbooks

== Was In popular culture ==
"Ekla Cholo Re"
"Ekla Cholo Re" excerpt from Kahaani movie depicts Bachchan’s infrequent vocal style

In 2004, "Ekla Chalo Re"'s tune was used with Hindi lyrics composed by A.R Rahman and sung by Sonu Nigam in the movie Netaji Subhas Chandra Bose: The Forgotten Hero. In the 2012 Bollywood film Kahaani, it is sung by actor Amitabh Bachchan under music direction of Vishal–Shekhar. Earlier, it was sung by Kishore Kumar, under the direction of Hemanta Mukhopadhyay. It was recorded by Hemanta Mukherjee in 1989.
