= Boalkhali Upazila =

Upazila in Chattogram Division, Bangladesh

Boalkhali বোয়ালখালী
- Upazila
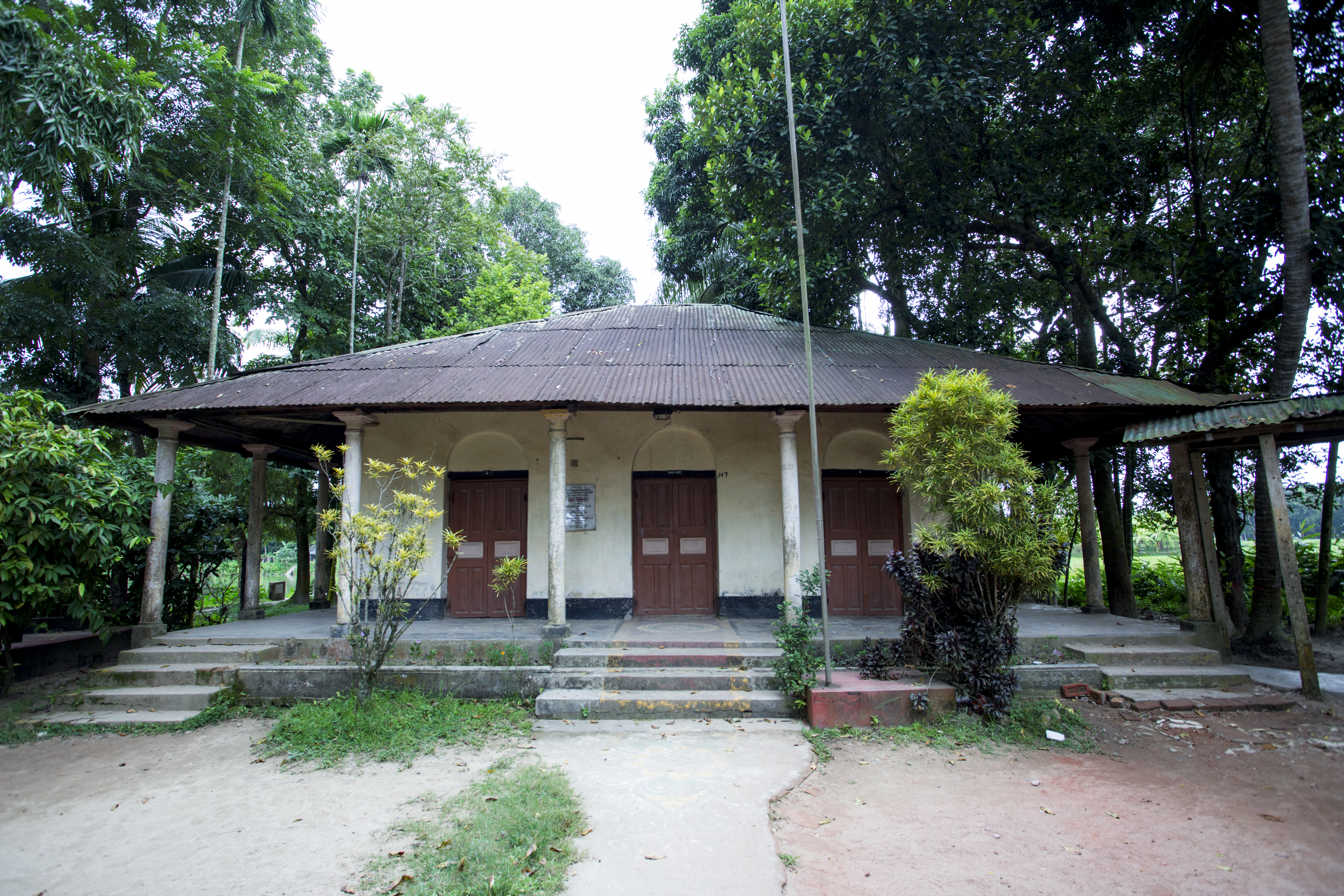
- Kadurkhil High School

- Coordinates: 22°22.7′N 91°55.2′E
- Country: Bangladesh
- Division: Chittagong
- District: Chittagong
- Jatiya Sangsad constituency: Chittagong-8
- Headquarters: Boalkhali Upazila Complex

Government
  - Body: Upazila Council
  - MP: Vacant
  - Chairman: Vacant

Area
  - Total: 126.46 km^{2} (48.83 sq mi)

Population (2022)
  - Total: 258,688
  - Density: 2,045.6/km^{2} (5,298.1/sq mi)
- Time zone: UTC+6 (BST)
- Postal code: 4366
- Area code: 03032
- Website: boalkhali.chittagong.gov.bd

Boalkhali Upazila mauza geocode map

Boalkhali (Bengali: বোয়ালখালী) is an upazila of Chattogram District in Chattogram Division, Bangladesh.

== Geography ==
Boalkhali is located at 22.3778°N 91.9208°E. It had 44108 households and its total area is 126.46 km^{2}.

According to the 2001 Bangladesh Census, there were 36,588 households.

== Demographics ==
According to the 2022 Bangladeshi census, Boalkhali Upazila had 58,014 households and a population of 258,688. 8.60% of the population were under 5 years of age. Boalkhali had a literacy rate (age 7 and over) of 83.45%: 85.32% for males and 81.69% for females, and a sex ratio of 95.72 males for every 100 females. 131,116 (50.68%) lived in urban areas.

Religions in Boalkhali Upazila (2022)
Religion	Percent
Islam	80.94%
Hinduism	17.32%
Buddhism	1.66%
Other or not stated	0.08%

Population by religion in Union/Paurashava
Union/Paurashava	Muslim	Hindu	Others
Boalkhali Paurashava	71,408	6,642	1,306
Ahalla Karaldenga Union	11,399	4,092	400
Amuchia Union	6,360	6,902	388
Charandwip Union	20,764	196	210
Kadhurkhil Union	13,475	2,407	0
Pashchim Gomdandi Union	12,920	105	4
Popadia Union	23,381	7,168	11
Saroatali Union	18,747	4,330	41
Shakpura Union	16,264	7,400	807
Sreepur Kharandwip Union	14,659	5,553	1,336

🟩 Muslim majority 🟧 Hindu majority

As of the 2011 Census of Bangladesh, Boalkhali upazila had 44,108 households and a population of 223,125. 46,730 (20.94%) were under 10 years of age. Boalkhali had an average literacy rate of 58.90%, compared to the national average of 51.8%, and a sex ratio of 1042 females per 1000 males. 31,206 (13.99%) of the population lived in urban areas.

As of the 2001 Bangladesh census, the population was 201,590, comprising 104,601 males and 96,989 females. Boalkhali had 9 Unions, 31 Mauza and 30 villages and the literacy rate was 71.8%.

As of the 1991 Bangladesh census, Boalkhali has a population of 195607. Males constitute 51.75% of the population, and females 48.25%. This Upazila's eighteen up population is 98116. Boalkhali has an average literacy rate of 48.5% (7+ years), and the national average of 32.4% literate.

== Notable residents ==
- Abdul Wahid Bengali (1850-1905), theologian, teacher and social reformer
- Binod Bihari Chowdhury, revolutionary, was born at Uttar Bhurshi village in 1911.
- Kalpana Datta, revolutionary, was born at Sreepur village in 1913.
- Shefali Ghosh, singer, was born at Kanungo Para village circa 1941.
- Rama Chowdhury - War heroine of Bangladesh Liberation war.
- Chinmoy Kumar Ghosh - Philosopher, Peace Meditations at the United Nations 1931
- Sultan Ahmed - Politician

== See also ==
- Upazilas of Bangladesh
- Districts of Bangladesh
- Divisions of Bangladesh
