= Bina Das =

Indian revolutionary and nationalist (1911–1986)

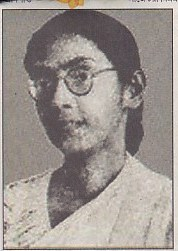
- Photograph of Bina Das from the early 1940s
- Born: 24 August 1911; Krishnanagar, Bengal Presidency, British India (now West Bengal, India)
- Died: 26 December 1986 (aged 75); Rishikesh, Uttarakhand, India
- Movement: Indian Independence movement
- Family: Kalyani Das (sister)
- Awards: Padma Shri

Bina Das (24 August 1911 – 26 December 1986) was an Indian revolutionary and nationalist from Bengal.

== Biography ==
=== Participation in India's freedom struggle ===
Das was a member of Chhatri Sangha, a semi-revolutionary organisation for women in Kolkata. On 6 February 1932, she attempted to assassinate the Bengal Governor Stanley Jackson, in the Convocation Hall of the University of Calcutta. The revolver was supplied by another freedom fighter Kamala Das Gupta. She fired five shots but none hit him. Her confession, which ran to five pages long and was written in English, was censored by the British colonial administration, but still found itself widely circulated. In it, she wrote:

My object was to die, and if to die, to die nobly fighting against this despotic system of Government, which has kept my country in perpetual subjection to its infinite shame and endless suffering – and fighting in a way which cannot but tell ... I have been thinking – is life worth living in an India so subjected to wrong, and continually groaning under the tyranny of a foreign Government, or is it not better to make one's supreme protest against it by offering one's life away? Would not the immolation of a daughter of India and of a son of England awaken India to the sin of its acquiescence to its continued state of subjection and England to the iniquities of its proceedings?

The Special Tribunal convened to judge her sentenced her to nine years of rigorous imprisonment on charges of attempted murder under section 307 of the Indian Penal Code.

After her release from jail, she became active in the Indian National Congress, participated in the Quit India Movement and was imprisoned till 1945. After independence, she was elected to the provincial assembly, but Bina Das left Congress due to ideological differences.

Though she did not join the Communist Party, she was attracted to socialist and communist ideals. She believed that Marxism should be re-established according to the needs of the country.

She was a friend of Suhasini Ganguly, a freedom fighter.

=== Personal life ===
She was the youngest of the five daughters of Beni Madhab Das and particularly influenced by immediate senior sister Kalyani and second brother who had also gone to jail. In 1947, she married Jatish Chandra Bhaumik, an Indian independence movement activist of the Jugantar group.

=== Death ===
After the death of her husband, Das led a lonely life in Rishikesh and died in anonymity and penury. Her dead body was found on the roadside on 26 December 1986 in a partially decomposed state. It was found by the passing crowd. The police were informed and it took them a month to determine her identity.

An alternate report by the current relatives of Bina Das says she was found unconscious at a bus stand and was taken to hospital by the police, where she died the next day. This was stated in a documentary on Bina Das broadcast on 26 December 2021 on DD Bangla.

== Legacy and awards ==
Her sister Kalyani Bhattacharjee edited a book called Bengal Speaks (published in 1944), and dedicated it to her.

Das was awarded Padma Shri in 1960 for her "Social Work".

In 2012, Das and Pritilata Waddedar were conferred the Graduation Certificates posthumously by Calcutta University, nearly 80 years after British government withheld them.

== Works ==
Bina Das wrote two autobiographical works in Bengali: Shrinkhal Jhankar and Pitridaan or gift from a father .
