= Shantisudha Ghosh =

Indian politician (1907–1992)

Shantisudha Ghosh

Shantisudha Ghosh (27 June 1907 – 7 May 1992) also written as Shanti Sudha Ghosh was an Indian politician, writer, teacher and communist thinker and an admirer of Aurobindo Ghosh. She was a sister of Debaprasad Ghosh. She was the Founder Principal of Hooghly Women's College.

== Early life and education ==
Ghosh was born to Kshetranath Ghosh, a professor of Brajmohan College, at Alokananda village of Barishal (now in Bangladesh) on 27 June 1907.

She got her early education from Brahmo Balika Bidyalaya and passed the B.A. Examination in 1928 and the M.A. Examination in 1930 from Calcutta University. An Ishan scholar in the BA Examination (1928) and a First Class MA in Mathematics (1930) from the Calcutta University, Shantisudha Ghosh (1893-1966), daughter of Kshetranath Ghosh, was born in an affluent family of Barishal in undivided Bengal. Sister of the renowned communist thinker and founder of the Socialist Unity Centre of India (SUCI), Debaprasad Ghosh, she did not subscribe to the political ideology of her elder brother.

She admired Aurobindo Ghosh’s integration of political activism with spiritual practice and expressed interest in secret society activities. She regarded Mahatma Gandhi as a leader but did not support his strategy of non-violent resistance.

She was primarily a revolutionary collaborator. Following Satin Sen’s Tarun Samgha (Youth Club), she organized a women's club called Shakti Vahini (Force of Strength) (1930) in Barishal to prepare them as a supplementary force for the revolution. Shantisudha had taught in premier colleges: Victoria Institution, Calcutta; Mohammad Mohasin College, Hooghly; and the Barishal Braja Mohan College; but always in association with her role as a revolutionary collaborator.

All these brought her under the police scanner. In 1934, she was arrested in Calcutta and interned in Barishal, but released on health grounds in 1937; when she drifted to Gandhian agitation. In 1942-43, she was imprisoned again; after her release she joined the famine relief work; followed by her escape to West Bengal in 1947, leaving behind her birth and workplace.
