= Kamala Das Gupta =

Indian activist (1907–2000)

- কমলা দাশগুপ্ত
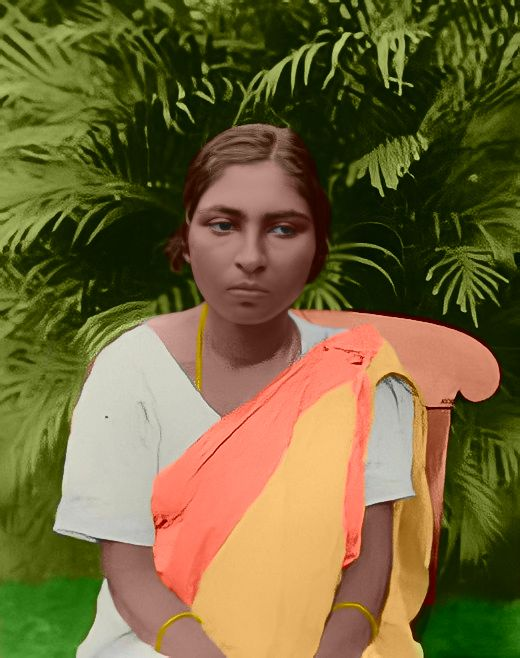
- Born: 11 March 1907; Patiya, Bikrampur, Dacca, Bengal Presidency, British India (now Munshiganj, Dhaka Division, Bangladesh)
- Died: 19 July 2000 (aged 93); Kolkata, West Bengal, India
- Education: Bethune College, University of Calcutta
- Occupation: Freedom fighter
- Known for: Indian independence movement

Kamala Das Gupta (11 March 1907 – 19 July 2000) was an Indian freedom fighter from Bengal region.

== Early life ==
Das Gupta was born in 1907, to a Bengali Baidya family of Bikrampur in Greater Dhaka, now in Bangladesh; the family later moved to Calcutta, where she got a Master of Arts degree in history from Bethune College, Calcutta University.

== Revolutionary activities ==
Nationalist ideas were current among the young people in Calcutta she met at university, and she was filling with a strong desire to take part in the freedom struggle. She tried to quit her studies and enter Mohandas Karamchand Gandhi's Sabarmati Ashram, but her parents disapproved. Finishing her education, she became friends with some members of the extremist Jugantar party, and was quickly converted from her original Gandhism to the cult of armed resistance.

In 1930, she left home and took a job as manager of a hostel for poor women. There she stored and couriered, bombs and bomb-making materials for the revolutionaries. She was arrested several times in connection with bombings but was released every time for want of evidence. She supplied Bina Das with the revolver that she used to try to shoot Governor Stanley Jackson in February 1922, and was arrested also on that occasion, but released. In 1933 the British finally succeeded in putting her behind bars. In 1936 she was released and placed under house arrest. In 1938 the Jugantar Party aligned itself with the Indian National Congress, and Kamala also transferred her allegiance to the larger party. Thenceforth she became involved in relief work, especially with the Burmese refugees of 1942 and 1943 and in 1946–1947 with the victims of communal rioting. She was in charge of the relief camp at Noakhali that Gandhi visited in 1946.

She worked for women's vocational training at the Congress Mahila Shilpa Kendra and the Dakshineshwar Nari Swabalambi Sadan. She edited the women's journal Mandira for many years. She authored two memoirs in Bengali, Rakter Akshare (In Letters of Blood, 1954) and Swadhinata Sangrame Nari (Women in the Freedom Struggle, 1963).

== Death ==
She died on 19 July 2000 in Kolkata.
