= List of accolades received by Margarita with a Straw =

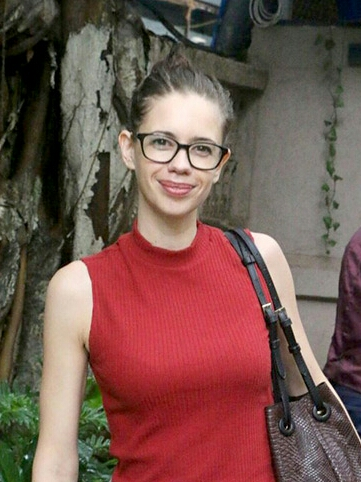
Kalki Koechlin's portrayal of Laila, a teenager with cerebral palsy won her numerous accolades

Margarita with a Straw is a 2014 Indian drama film directed by Shonali Bose. The film had its world premiere at 2014 Toronto International Film Festival, where it won the NETPAC Award or International Asian Film Premiere. The production won the Audience Award and the Youth Jury Award at the 2014 Tallinn Black Nights Film Festival, and the 2015 Vesoul International Film Festival of Asian Cinema respectively. Mikey McCleary won the Best Composer Award at the 9th Asian Film Awards. Koechlin won several accolades for the film, including the Best Actress Award at the Tallinn Black Nights Film Festival, the Screen Award for Best Actress, and the Jury Award at the 63rd National Film Awards. Additionally, she had garnered nominations for Best Actress at the Seattle International Film Festival and the Asian Film Awards.

== Accolades ==
Award	Date of ceremony (Note: Date is linked to the article about the awards held that year, wherever possible.)	Category	Recipients	Result	Refs
Asian Film Awards	25 March 2015	Best Actress	Kalki Koechlin	Nominated	
Asian Film Awards	25 March 2015	Best Composer	Mikey McCleary	Won	
Frameline Film Festival		Best Feature (Audience)	Margarita with a Straw	Won	
Galway Film Fleadh		Best International Film	Margarita with a Straw	Won	
Guadalajara International Film Festival		Best Feature Film	Margarita with a Straw	Nominated	
Montclair Film Festival		World Cinema (Audience Award)	Margarita with a Straw	Won	
Montclair Film Festival		Narrative Feature Competition	Shonali Bose, Nilesh Maniyar	Nominated	
Nashville Film Festival		Bridgestone Narrative Competition (Grand Jury Prize)	Shonali Bose, Nilesh Maniyar	Nominated	
Nashville Film Festival		Best Screenplay	Shonali Bose, Nilesh Maniyar	Won	
Ljubljana LGBT Film Festival	5 December 2015	Pink Dragon Jury Award	Margarita with a Straw	Won	
National Film Awards	3 May 2016	Special Jury Award	Kalki Koechlin	Won	
Palm Springs International Film Festival		Best Narrative Feature	Shonali Bose, Nilesh Maniyar	Nominated	
Screen Awards	8 January 2016	Best Actress	Kalki Koechlin	Nominated	
Screen Awards	8 January 2016	Best Actress (Jury)	Kalki Koechlin	Won	
Seattle International Film Festival		Golden Space Needle Award	Kalki Koechlin	Runner-up	
Tallinn Black Nights Film Festival		Best Actress	Kalki Koechlin	Won	
Tallinn Black Nights Film Festival		Grand Prize	Shonali Bose, Mukesh Maniyar	Nominated	
Times of India Film Awards		Best Actress	Kalki Koechlin	Won	
Toronto International Film Festival		NETPAC Award	Shonali Bose	Won	
Vancouver International Women in Film Festival		Best Actress	Kalki Koechlin	Won	
Vancouver International Women in Film Festival		Best Cinematography	Anne Misawa	Nominated	
VC FilmFest–Los Angeles Asian Pacific Film Festival		Best Narrative Feature	Shonali Bose	Nominated	

== See also ==
- List of Bollywood films of 2014
