= Subodh Roy =

Indian politician (1915–2006)

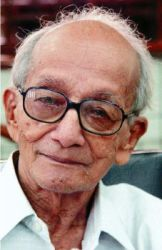
- Born: 1915; Chittagong District, Bengal Province, British India
- Died: 26 August 2006 (aged 90–91); Calcutta, India
- Other name: Jhunku Roy
- Known for: Indian independence movement activist, Revolutionist
- Political party: Communist Party of India (Marxist)
- Parents: Rasik Chandra Ray (father); Sarayu devi (mother)

Subodh Roy (1915 – 26 August 2006) (also known as Jhunku Roy) was an Indian revolutionary socialist who was influential in the Indian independence movement, and a politician.

== Biography ==
Subodh Roy was born in 1915 to a rich family at Chittagong in erstwhile-undivided Bengal. At the age of 14, he was the youngest participant in the Chittagong armoury raid in 1930-31 under the direction of the revolutionary leader Surya Sen (Masterda). Roy was in the first batch to be sentenced.

After the trial, Subodh Roy was deported to the Cellular Jail in Port Blair in 1934.

After his release from jail in 1940, he joined communist politics and became a member of the Communist Party of India. After the independence of India, he shifted to Calcutta and joined as a whole timer at the Provincial Centre of the Party. After the split in the Communist Party of India in 1964, Subodh Roy sided with the Communist Party of India (Marxist) (CPI(M)). He was a longstanding member of the West Bengal state committee of the CPI(M).

Subodh Roy made major scholarly contributions to the history of the communist movement. After conducting research in the National Archives, he edited a book titled "Communism in India: Unpublished Documents".

== Popular culture ==
Delzad Hilwade played the role of young Subodh Roy (nicknamed Jhunku) while Vijay Varma played his older self in Bedabrata Pain's film Chittagong.
