= Shoba Raja =

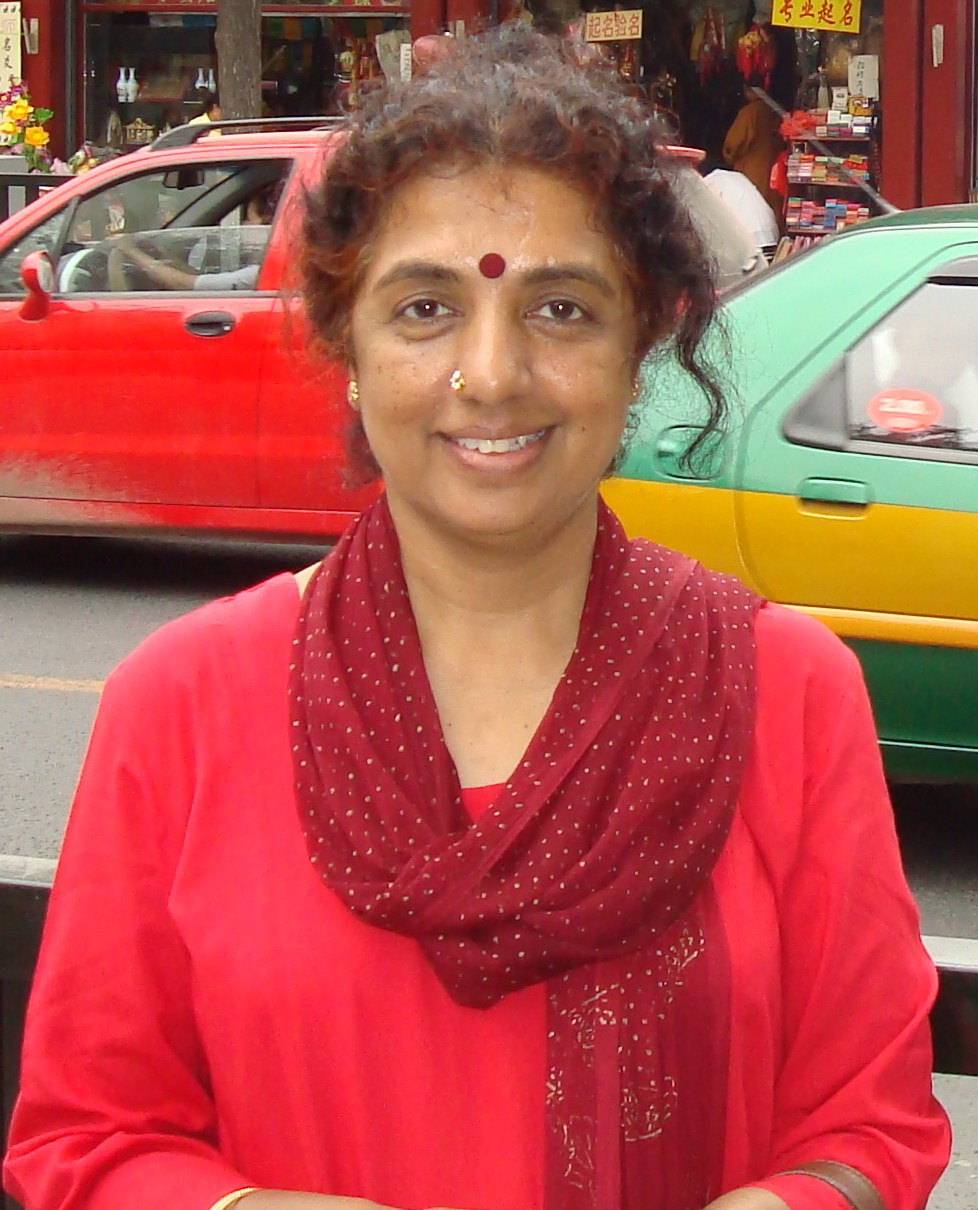
Shoba Raja

Shoba Raja is an Indian psychologist and known for her work in developmental issues of vulnerable groups within the field of disability and mental health.

== Biography ==
She graduated with a bachelor's degree in Psychology from the University of Bombay and later with a Masters in Medical and Psychiatric Social Work from the Tata Institute of Social Sciences in Mumbai. She worked for a number of years as a Medical social worker for various organisations in Mumbai, including "Asha Sadan", a home for destitute women and children and adoption center, The Spastics Society of India where she fulfilled a number of research and consultant roles, as well as a number of other organisations working with people with disabilities.

In 1999, Raja began her work with ActionAid (India) as a Policy analyst, which included specific focuses on decentralised governance and elementary education. Raja later joined BasicNeeds which works with people with mental disorders and their carers in Ghana, Uganda, Kenya, Tanzania, India, Sri Lanka, Nepal, Lao PDR and Vietnam. Here she took on a number of research roles, starting as a Research Policy Analyst, then later becoming Programme Manager for International Policy and Research. She currently is Director of Policy and Practice for BasicNeeds which involves overall monitoring, evaluation, impact assessment and quality assurance of all field programmes of the countries where the organisation operates. Since 2000, the organisation has reached 78,036 people with mental illness or epilepsy.

Raja has worked in collaborative research projects with Kingston University in Ontario, Canada, and currently manages BasicNeeds' collaborations with the London School of Economics, UK; University of Cape Town, South Africa; University of Melbourne, Australia; Queensland University of Technology, Australia; and Millennium Village Project of the UN's Millennium Development Goals (MDGs). She has published many research papers and articles on disability and mental health, as well as managing BasicNeeds' International Research Programme and Knowledge Programme.

Amongst other achievements, Raja is an Honorary visiting fellow at the London School of Economics, she is a member of the advisory group for the Movement for Global Mental Health, a global network of individuals and institutions who are committed to scaling up of evidence-based services for people living with mental disorders, as well as an advisor to the World Psychiatric Association's (WPA) task force for developing best practices in working with service users and carers. Raja spent time as a member of scientific panel of the Grand Challenges in Global Mental Health, an initiative which aims to bring neuropsychiatric disorders to the forefront of global attention and scientific inquiry, and as a promoter and advisor for Janodaya Microfinance Public Trust, a non-banking financial company in India that works with women's self-help groups providing them credit, business training and on-going support for socio-economic growth.

== Publications ==
=== Peer Reviewed Papers and Book Chapters ===
- Raja S, Kippen S, Menil V, Mannarath S, (2010) Mapping Mental Health Financing in Ghana, Uganda, Sri Lanka, India and Lao PDR. International Journal of Mental Health Systems, 4(11)
- Raja S, Kippen S, Reich MR. Access to Psychiatric Medicines in Africa. Forthcoming In: Akyeampong E, Hill A, Kleinman A, eds. Culture, mental illness and psychiatric practice in Africa. Bloomington (IN): Indiana University Press; 2009
- Boyce W, Raja S, Patranabish R G, Truelove B, Deme-der D & Gallupe O, 2009. Occupation, poverty and mental health improvement in Ghana. European Journal of Disability Research, 3(3): pp233–244
- McDaid, D, Raja S, Knapp M. (2008) Barriers in the Mind: Promoting an Economic Case for Mental Health in Low and Middle-Income Countries. World Psychiatry, 7(2)
- Raja S, Mannarath S, Sagar T. India: Integrated Primary Care for Mental Health in the Thiruvananthapuram District, Kerala State. In: Integrating mental health into primary care- A global perspective. World Health Organization and World Organization of Family Doctors (Wonca), Switzerland: WHO Press. 2008. pp. 109–123
- Raja S, Boyce, W F, Ramani, S, Underhill, C, (2008) Success Indicators for Integrating Mental Health Interventions with Community-based Rehabilitation Projects. International Journal of Rehabilitation Research, 31(4): pp284–292
- Boyce W, Raja S, Boyce E, (2001) Standing on our own Feet. Asia Pacific Disability Rehabilitation Journal
- Boyce W, Raja S, Boyce E, (2003). Standing on our own Feet (book chapter) Women, Disability and Identity, (Eds. Hans A, Patri A), Sage Publications, New Delhi

=== Manuals, Books ===
- Raja S, Underhill C. (2009). Community Mental Health Practice: Seven Essential Features for Scaling Up in Low- and Middle-Income Countries (Monograph)
- Raja S, Kermode M, Gibson K, Manarath S, Devine A, Sunder U. (2009). An Introduction to Mental Health: Facilitators Manual for Training Community Health Workers in India, BasicNeeds and The Nossal Institute of Global Health, University of Melbourne
- Raja S, Tebboth M, Astbury T. (2008) Mental Health and Development: A Model in Practice.(with a foreword by Prof. Jeffery Sachs)
- Raja S, Bhaskaran N, Bell E, (2003). Just People… Nothing Special, Nothing Unusual: A field Worker’s introduction to Disability Rights and Community Based Rehabilitation, Books for Change Publications, ActionAid, India
- Raja S, (2000). Urban Slums Reach Out, Books for Change Publications, ActionAid, India

=== Evaluative Research Studies ===
- Raja S, Kippen S, Mannarath S, Mishra SK, Mohammed S. Evaluating Economic Outcomes of the Mental Health and Development Model in North India. BasicNeeds. 2008.
- Raja S, Kippen S, Janardhana N, Mannarath S. Evaluating Functional and Economic Outcomes of the Mental Health and Development Model in Northern Karnataka, India. May 2008
- Raja S, Kippen S, Janardhana N. Evaluating Economic Outcomes of the Mental Health and Development Model in Andhra Pradesh, India, April 2008.

=== Research Studies ===
- Kubi A, Raja S, Boyce W. Mental Health: Access to Treatment and Macro-Economics in Ghana June 2007
- Raja S, Boyce W, Antwi-Bekow T, Deme-der D. Mental Illness and Economic Well Being, September 2007
- Raja S, Boyce W, Patranabhish R, Antwi-Bekow T, Deme-der D. Demographic and Economic Characteristics of People with Mental Illness: A study in Ghana September 2007
- Boyce W, Raja S, Boyce E, (1999). Standing on our own Feet: The Experiences of a Group of Young Disabled Indian Women in Independent Living, Association of People with Disabilities, Karnataka, India & Queen's University, Ontario, Canada

=== Field Programme Evaluations ===
- Underhill C, Raja S. Sustaining Community-based approach to Mental Health and Development in Bihar and Jharkhand End project evaluation of the Big Lottery Fund (UK) supported programme in India, November 2008
- Underhill C, Raja S. To demonstrate the mainstreaming of poor mentally ill people in Kangemi informal settlements in Nairobi, Mid-Term evaluation of DFID (UK) supported programme in Kenya, February 2007
- Underhill C, Raja S. Building Regional Alliances to sustain Community Mental Health and Development in Northern Ghana Mid-Term Evaluation of Comic Relief (UK) supported programme, August 2006
- Underhill C, Raja S, Surendranathan V. Integrating Community Mental Health and Development for Poor Urban Communities in Accra, Ghana, Mid-Term Evaluation of Comic Relief (UK) supported programme, April 2006
- Underhill C, Raja S, Yaro P, Kingori J. Integrating Mental Health and Development in Uganda Mid-Term Evaluation of DFID (UK) supported programme, October 2005
- Underhill C, Raja S, Isaac M. Report of the Mid-Term Review Mission: Gujarat Mental Health Support Programme, India, December 2004.
- Raja S. Social Audit Report of the Community Based Rehabilitation Project, The Spastics Society of India, Chennai (1994)
- Raja S. Social Audit Report of the Special Training Unit, The Spastics Society of India, Chennai (1993)
