= CIT 6 =

Carbon star in the constellation Leo Minor

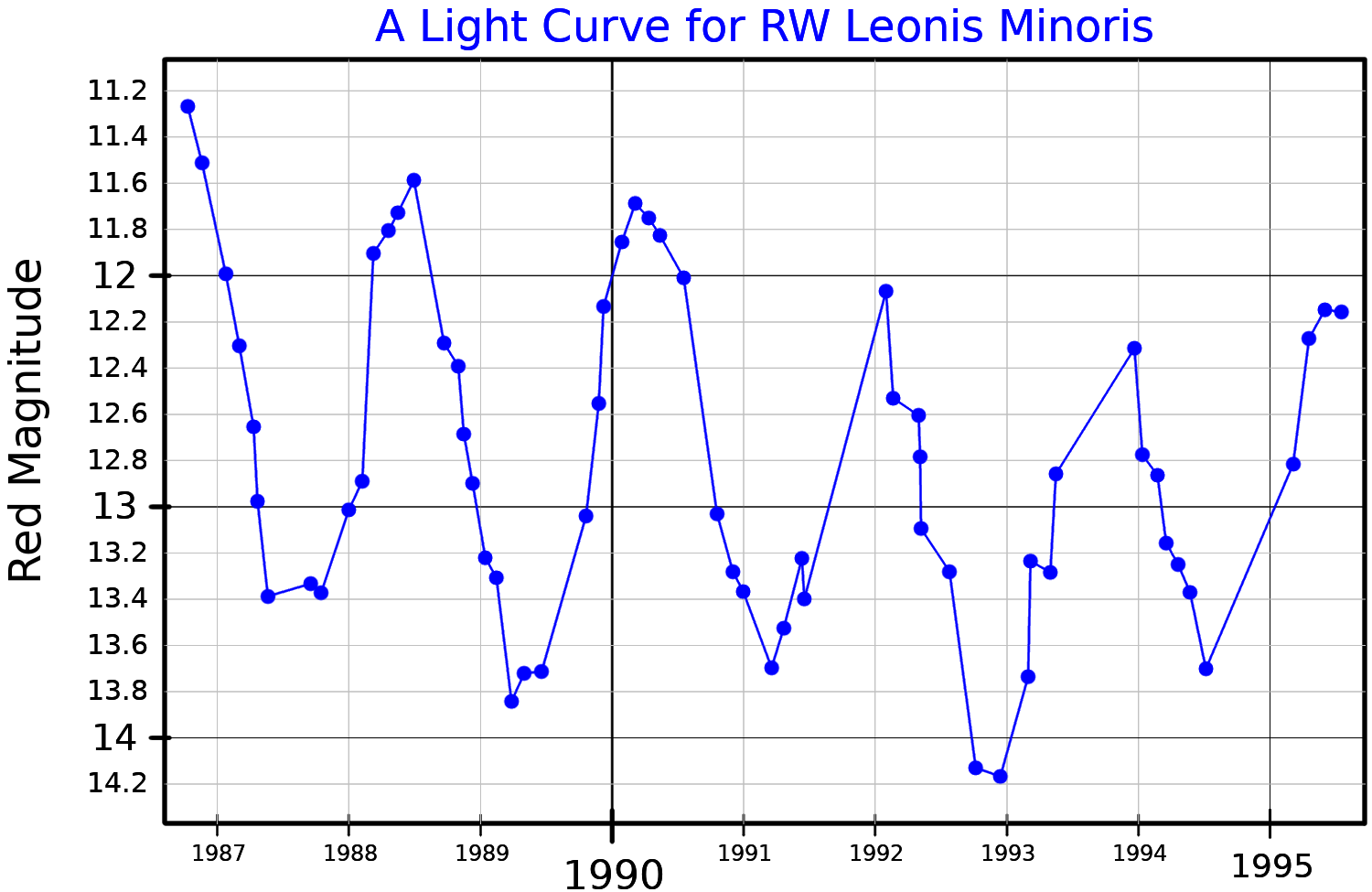
- An R band light curve for RW Leonis Minoris, adapted from Alksnis (1995)

Observation data Epoch J2000 Equinox J2000
- Constellation: Leo Minor
- Right ascension: 10^{h} 16^{m} 02.27770^{s}
- Declination: +30° 34′ 19.0451″
- Apparent magnitude (V): 12.8 - 16.5

Characteristics
- Evolutionary stage: AGB
- Spectral type: C4,3
- Variable type: SRa

Astrometry
Radial velocity (R_{v})	−1.5 (LSR) km/s
Proper motion (μ)	RA: −18.803 mas/yr Dec.: 8.940 mas/yr
Parallax (π)	3.1833±0.2413 mas
Distance	1,020 ± 80 ly (310 ± 20 pc)

Details

primary
Mass	<1 M_{☉}
Radius	820 or 1,000 (Note: Applying the Stefan–Boltzmann law with a nominal solar effective temperature of 5,772 K: $\sqrt{\biggl(\frac{5,772}{2,000}\biggr)^4 \cdot 9,700} = 820\ R_\odot.$ $\sqrt{\biggl(\frac{5,772}{1,800}\biggr)^4 \cdot 10,000} = 1,000\ R_\odot$.) R_{☉}
Luminosity	9,700 or 10,000 L_{☉}
Temperature	1,800; 2,000 K

companion
Mass	1-2 M_{☉}

Other designations
- RW LMi, AFGL 1403, IRC+30219, IRAS 10131+3049, 2MASS J10160228+3034190

Database references
SIMBAD	data

CIT 6 is a carbon star in the constellation Leo Minor. It is a semiregular variable star, with a period of about 628 days, and has been given the variable star designation RW Leonis Minoris. It is perhaps the second most studied carbon star, after CW Leonis. CIT 6 was discovered in 1966 by a group at the California Institute of Technology (which is why it is named CIT 6) who found it using the same 62-inch infrared telescope on Mount Wilson that was used to produce the Two-Micron Sky Survey. It is the second brightest carbon star in the near-infrared, after CW Leonis (which is much closer to us).

CIT 6 is believed to be a highly evolved star, in transition from the AGB phase to the protoplanetary nebula phase. It is surrounded by a thick circumstellar envelope (CSE) of dust and molecular gas. Absorption and re-radiation of the starlight by the dust makes the object far brighter in the infrared than it is in visible light. The molecular gas was first seen by Knapp and Morris in 1985, who detected a CO emission line. Later studies of millimeter-wave radio emission have detected over 20 different molecular species in the CSE. There include CN, HCN, HC_{3}N, HC_{5}N, HC_{7}N, SiS, SiO, SiC_{2}, C_{4}H and CH_{3}CN.

HST images show that the dust component of the innermost region of CIT 6's CSE has developed the bipolar shape that is frequently seen in protoplanetary nebulae. High spatial resolution interferometric measurements show that the CO emission lines arise from a spiral structure. The spiral structure of the molecular gas outflow, combined with the bipolar shape seen by the HST, strongly suggests that CIT 6's AGB star has a binary companion.

Although it's invisible to the human eye, the CSE of CIT 6 covers a region of our night sky roughly 1/4 of the size of the full moon. The outermost edge of the CSE was seen by the GALEX satellite. It appears as two long arcs of emission (of ultraviolet light) 15 and 18 arc minutes in diameter, caused by the stellar wind colliding with the interstellar medium. The large size of the CSE indicates that CIT 6 has been losing mass at a high rate for at least 93,000 years.

== See also ==
- List of largest known stars
