= Donald Figer =

American astronomer

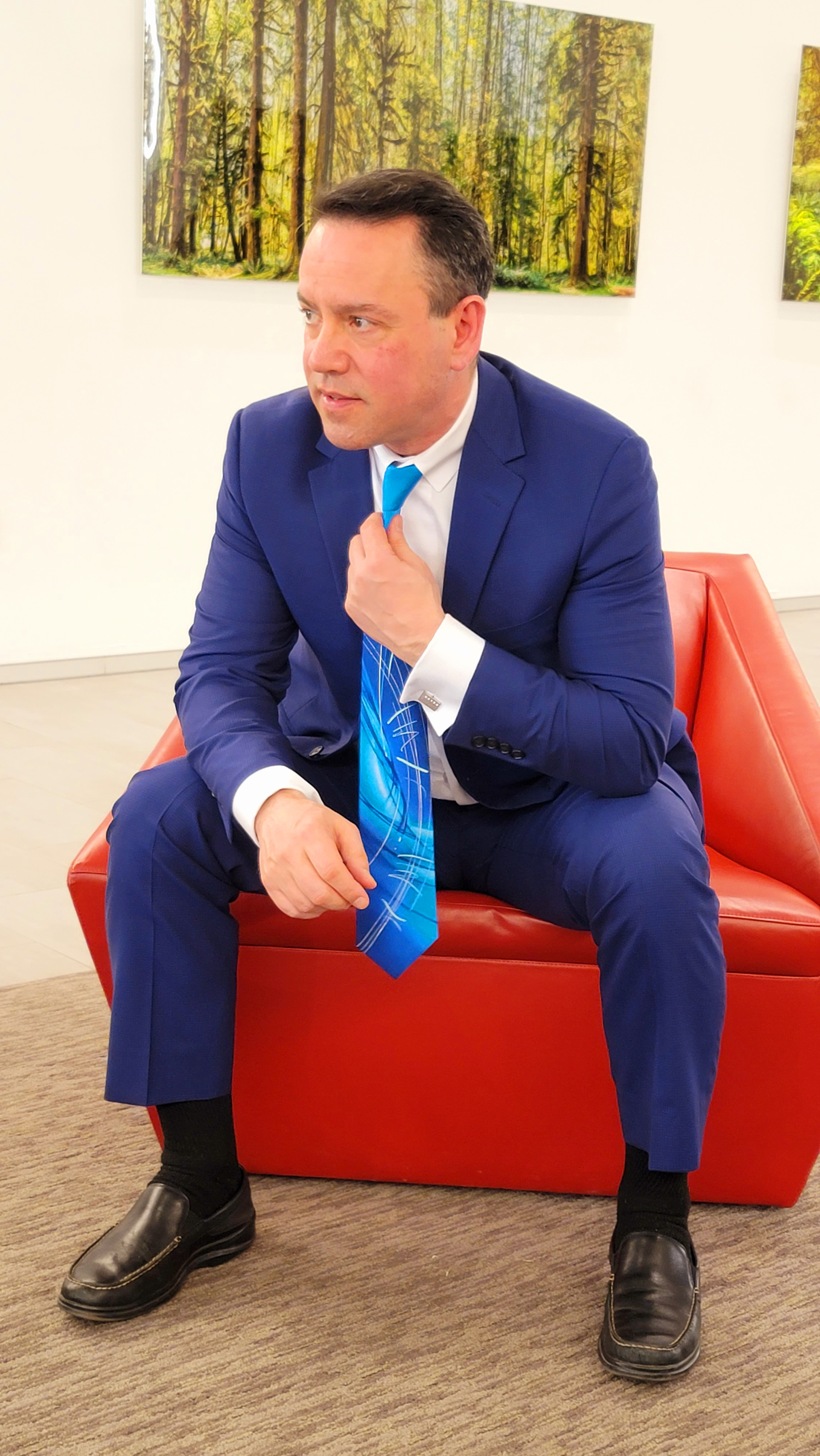
- Education: Northwestern University (BA) University of Chicago (MS) University of California (PhD)
- Scientific career
- Workplaces: Rochester Institute of Technology (2006–); Space telescope Science Institute (1999–2006); Johns Hopkins University (2000–2004); University of California, Los Angeles (1996–1999)
- Doctoral advisors: Eric Becklin; Ian McLean; Mark Morris

Donald F. Figer is an American astronomer and a professor in the College of Science of the Rochester Institute of Technology. He is also the director of RIT's Future Photon Initiative, Center for Detectors, and Rochester Imaging Detector Laboratory. His research interests include massive stars, massive star clusters, red supergiants, the Galactic Center, and the development of advanced technologies for astrophysics and a broad range of applications.

== Early life and education ==
Donald F. Figer was born in Euclid, OH, and attended Wickliffe City Schools through high school. While there, Richard Benz, Figer's science teacher, made sure to inspire his passion, remarking that “When you have a student with that kind of passion for science research, the environment I can create is going to allow that to be channeled in that direction.” Figer has a BA from Northwestern University, an MS from the University of Chicago, and a PhD from the University of California, Los Angeles.

== Research ==
=== Scientific research ===
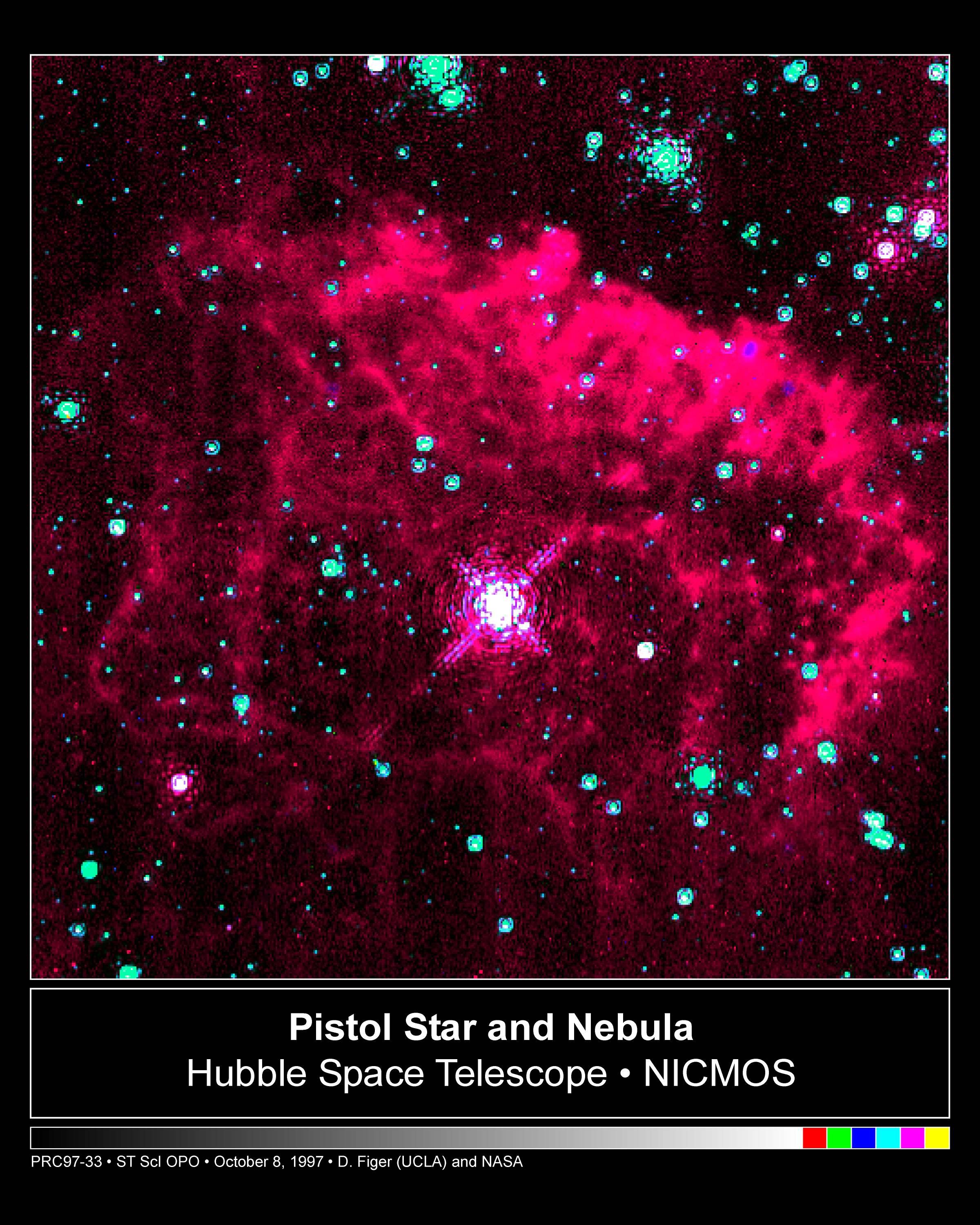
False-color image of the Pistol Star and Pistol Nebula (HST NICMOS)

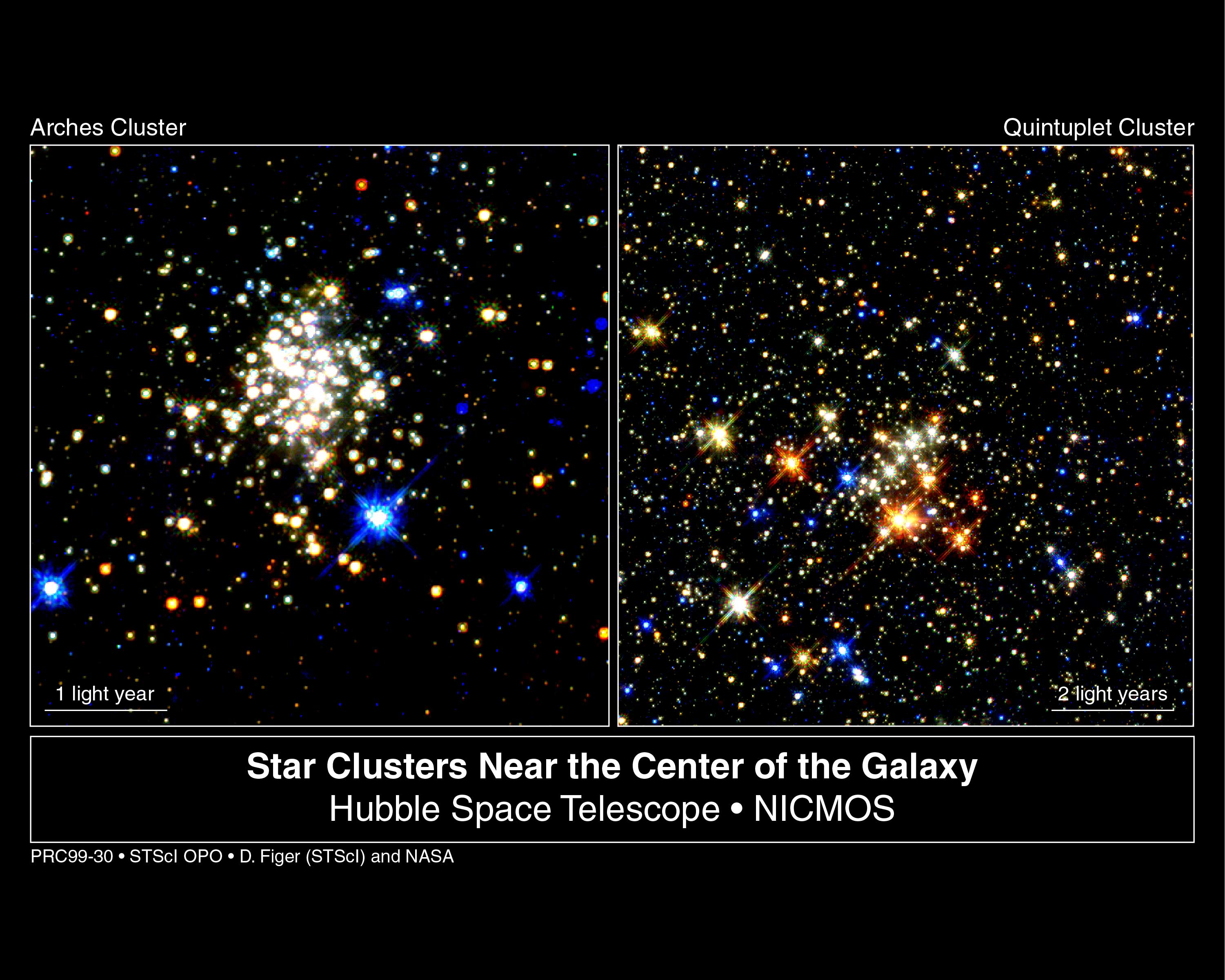
Star Clusters near the center of the Galaxy (HST NICMOS)

Using the Hubble Space Telescope, Figer observed approximately one thousand stars in a young star cluster, the Arches Cluster, which is near the Galactic Center. By measuring the initial mass function, he identified an upper limit of 150 solar masses to the masses of stars. His teams performed the first census of massive stars in both the Quintuplet Cluster and the Arches Cluster, finding that massive star clusters form in the present-day Galaxy, as opposed to the previous paradigm that suggested such clusters only formed at the time that the Galaxy formed. Figer led a team to identify the Pistol Star as one of the most massive stars known in the Galaxy using data that the team obtained using the Hubble Space Telescope. To a local newspaper, Figer remarked that the Pistol Star is one of the few stars that appear in a state where stars bubble out much of their material and eject it. He said, “It’s a nice consistent picture to help us understand why massive stars eject their outer layers. The Pistol Star may be that rare stage between being normal and going on to its last death throes.” In the same interview, Figer spoke about coming up with a good name for the star, stating, “Just before the press release, we were scratching our heads about what to call the star," Figer said, adding that its original name – QF134—"wasn't that sexy.” The star's name comes from the nebula that surrounds it that looks similar to a pistol.

=== Instrumentation development ===
Figer has developed and used advanced instrumentation for astrophysics his whole career. He led the electronics development for a double-beam IR camera used at Lick Observatory. He and collaborators used this camera to make the first K-band spectral atlas of Wolf-Rayet stars and to search for massive stars near the Galactic center for his PhD thesis (A Search for Emission-line Star Near the Galactic Center). Figer was the Principal Optical Designer for the Near Infrared Echelle Spectrograph (NIRSpec) for the Keck II Telescope while at UCLA. He and his team used this instrument to take infrared spectra of a massive obscured star cluster located in Antennae Galaxies, estimate the mass of the supermassive black hole located at the Galactic center, and survey the organic volatile species in comet C/1999 H1 (Lee), among many other projects. Figer was one of the detector scientists working on the James Webb Space Telescope (JWST). He helped in many areas relating to JWST including developing the wavefront sensing deployment procedure and serving as an instrument scientist for JWST NIRCam. He also led the team at the Independent Detector Testing Laboratory (IDTL), jointly operated by Space Telescope Science Institute and Johns Hopkins University, to assist NASA in choosing and operating near-infrared detectors on JWST.

=== Current research ===
Donald F. Figer currently leads the following projects.

- A Single Photon Sensing and Photon Number Resolving Detector for NASA missions (Collaboration with Dartmouth and sponsored by NASA): The objective of this project is to advance optical detector technology to the point where individual photons can be counted and be realized in a very large pixel format (Gigapixel per detector scale) but still maintains performance that is standard with the state-of-the-art devices of today.
- New Infrared Detectors for Astrophysics (Sponsored by National Science Foundation): The object of the overall project is to provide ground-based astronomers a new family of detectors that have very large formats, very low cost, and state-of-the-art performance through advancing technology on depositing HgCdTe on silicon wafers. Phase II is focused on building on the promising devices designed in Phase I and improving them. Key areas of focus are reducing randomly distributed pixels and implement process improvement to keep up with current standards.

== Career and skills ==
After obtaining a PhD, Figer continued at UCLA as a Postdoctoral Scholar and then a Research Scientist, during which he served as Principal Optical Designer and Local Project Scientist for the Near Infrared Spectrograph (NIRSPEC) for the Keck Telescope. Figer then became an astronomer at the Space Telescope Science Institute where he co-founded, and became director of, the IDTL. Figer was also a detector scientist for the James Webb Space Telescope. Figer then moved to the Rochester Institute of Technology as a professor. Figer has advised many undergraduate and graduate students and Postdoctoral research scholars. Figer has professional training in project management, technical presentations, and principles of optical systems layout. He has become proficient in multiple circuits, mechanical, and optical design computer systems. He has also used many observatories, including HST, Chandra, Spitzer, KPNO, CTIO, Gemini, UKIRT, Kuiper Airborne Observatory, NASA Infrared Telescope Facility, Lick Observatory, Keck Observatory.

== Personal life ==
According to the New York Post, Figer was involved in a legal battle with his ex-wife, who wanted to have their daughter vaccinated against COVID-19 against Figer's wishes. The New York Post story says Figer "asked his ex not to rush to vaccinate their young daughter, saying there hadn’t been any studies conducted on the long-term side effects, according to court papers." A judge ruled that their daughter could be vaccinated. Monroe county Supreme Court Justice Richard Dollinger was later quoted that he is “somewhat perplexed that an accomplished scientist and professor would oppose a child vaccine authorized by the CDC, and universally encouraged by state and local physicians, and other health officials.”

== Media appearances ==
TV and radio appearances
| Year | Program | Notes |
|---|---|---|
| 2022 | Greater Rochester | Inspire Greater, “We’ve paved the way to the future.”, Greater Rochester, NY |
| 2020 | WROC News Channel 8 | Rethinking black holes: New theory says that something that goes into one won’t be gone for good |
| 2020 | WROC News Channel 8 | Super-massive black hole discovery brings home the Nobel Prize in physics, and an RIT professor helped Business Report: RIT coming up with a plan that would help make faster computers |
| 2020 | WXXI News | Business Report: RIT coming up with a plan that would help make faster computers |
| 2019 | WXXI AM News | Grant for Quantum Technology |
| 2018 | WROC News Channel 8 | Chinese Space Station Heading Towards Earth |
| 2014 | WXXI AM News | Connections: 8-14-14 |
| 2009 | The Universe | Season 4 Episode 7: "The Search for Cosmic Clusters" |
| 2009 | The Universe | Season 4 Episode 10: "Pulsars" |
| 2009 | Channel 8/31 News (CBS/Fox) | "Sponsored Research Funding' |
| 2005 | NPR | Limits on Star Size |
| 1997 | New York Times | At the Core of the Milky Way, The Brightest Star Ever Seen |

== Honors and awards ==
- SPIE Fellow Designation (2023)
- RIT College of Science Outstanding Outreach Award (2012)
- NASA JWST Project Team Award (2009)
- RIT Million Dollar Club (2009)
- Wickliffe High School Achievement Hall of Fame Inductee (2006)
- NYSTAR Faculty Development Award (2005)
- NASA Space Act Award (2004)
- AURA STScI Technology and Innovation Award (2004)
- UCLA Distinction in Teaching Award (1995)

== Publications ==
Figer has published over 200 papers, having over 5,000 citations, and has been a referee for multiple prestigious journals, including Nature, Science, Astronomy & Astrophysics and Society of Photo-Optical Instrumentation Engineers. Some of his notable papers include:

- Figer, Donald F. (March 2005). "An upper limit to the masses of stars". Nature. 434 (7030): 192–194. arXiv:astro-ph/0503193. Bibcode:2005Natur.434..192F. doi:10.1038/nature03293. PMID 15758993. S2CID 4417561.
- Figer, Donald F.; Najarro, Francisco; Gilmore, Diane; Morris, Mark; King, Sungsoo S.; Serabyn, Eugene; McLean, Ian S.; Gilbert, Andrea M.; Graham, James R.; Larkin, James E.; Levenson, N. A.; Teplitz, Harry I. (December 2002). "Massive Stars in the Arches Cluster". The Astrophysical Journal. 581 (1): 258–275. arXiv:astro-ph/0208145. Bibcode:2002ApJ...581..258F. doi:10.1086/344154. S2CID 119002004.
- Figer, Donald F.; McLean, Ian S.; Morris, Mark (March 1999). "Massive Stars in the Quintuplet Cluster". The Astrophysical Journal. 514 (1): 202–220. arXiv:astro-ph/9903281. Bibcode:1999ApJ...514..202F. doi:10.1086/306931. S2CID 15816020.
- Figer, Donald F.; Kim, Sungsoo S.; Morris, Mark; Serabyn, Eugene; Rich, R. Michael; McLean, Ian S. (November 1999). "Hubble Space Telescope/NICMOS Observations of Massive Stellar Clusters near the Galactic Center". The Astrophysical Journal. 525 (2): 750–758. arXiv:astro-ph/9906299. Bibcode:1999ApJ...525..750F. doi:10.1086/307937. S2CID 16833191.
- McLean, Ian S.; Becklin, Eric E.; Bendiksen, Oddvar; Brims, George; Canfield, John; Figer, Donald F.; Graham, James R.; et al. (August 1998). Fowler, Albert M (ed.). "Design and development of NIRSPEC: a near-infrared echelle spectrograph for the Keck II telescope". Infrared Astronomical Instrumentation. 3354: 566. Bibcode:1998SPIE.3354..566M. doi:10.1117/12.317283. S2CID 24626586.
- Figer, Donald F.; Najarro, Francsico; Morris, Mark; McLean, Ian S.; Geballe, Thomas R.; Langer, Norbert; et al. (October 1998). "The Pistol Star". The Astrophysical Journal. 506 (1): 384–404. Bibcode:1998ApJ...506..384F. doi:10.1086/306237. S2CID 120094728.
