= Mithu Alur =

Indian researcher, writer, and disability rights activist

Dr. Mithu Alur
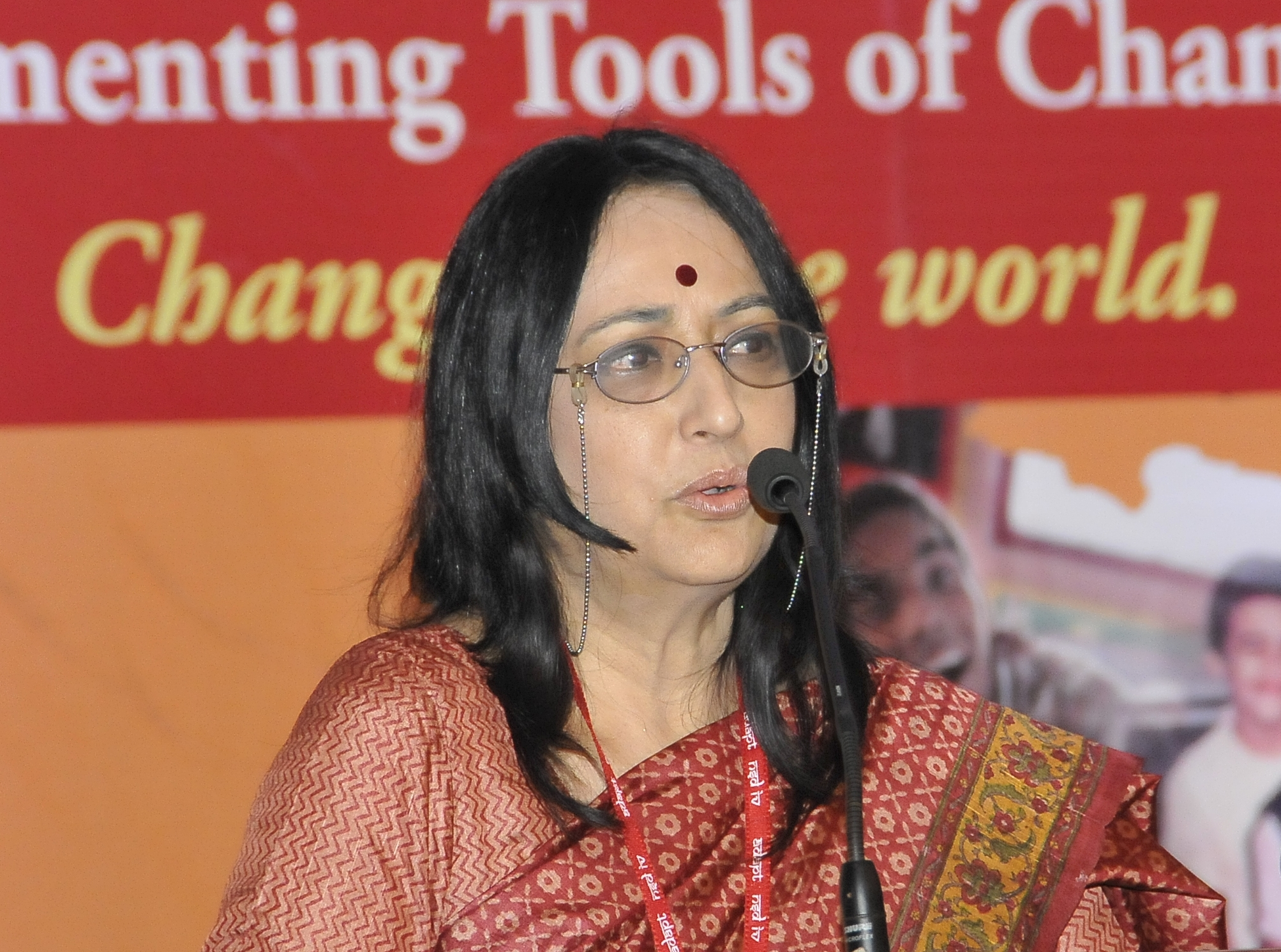
- Alur at the North South Dialogue IV, Goa in February, 2012
- Born: Shoma Bose; 27 March 1943 (age 83); Kolkata, India
- Occupations: Educator, Disability Rights Activist, Researcher, Writer, Published Author
- Years active: 1972–present
- Organization: ADAPT – Able Disable All People Together
- Known for: Starting services for people with disability in India
- Spouse: Sathi Alur
- Children: Malini Chib, Nikhil Chib
- Website: www.adaptssi.org/home.html

Mithu Alur (born 27 March 1943) is an Indian educator, writer, and disability rights activist. She is the founding chair of ADAPT – Able Disable All People Together, formerly known as the Spastics Society of India. She is specialised in the care and education of people with neuromuscular and developmental disabilities, such as cerebral palsy, autism, Down syndrome and intellectual disabilities.

== Early life and education ==
Alur was born and raised in Kolkata. She did her higher education in Delhi in Miranda House, and acquired a bachelor's degree in English literature from the University of Delhi in 1963.

In 1965, Alur married Ranjit Chib, and their daughter Malini Chib was born a year later. Malini was diagnosed with cerebral palsy, and in 1968, finding that there were no schools for children with disabilities in India, Alur trained as a teacher of special education at the Institute of Education (IOE), University of London.

== Spastics Society of India ==
Back in India, Alur contacted Indian Prime Minister Indira Gandhi, hoping to open a school in Mumbai. Gandhi advised her to contact actress Nargis Dutt, who became the first patron of the Spastics Society of India (SSI), which formally launched on 2 October 1972.

Alur later set up the Centre for Special Education, the first special school in India for children with cerebral palsy, in Colaba on 2 October 1973, providing education and treatment in one facility. The centre began with three children: Malini Chib, Farhan Contractor and Imtiaz. Nargis Dutt remained the patron of the centre until her death in 1981, when she was replaced by her husband, Sunil Dutt.

The Spastics Society later broadened its activities to include teacher training, as well as vocational training of young adults with cerebral palsy, autism, intellectual disabilities, multiple disabilities and learning disabilities. It also works in the field of advocacy and awareness and offers support to parents and other professionals. The Spastics Society of India has been renamed ADAPT – Able Disable All People Together, and many of the state level branches of the organisation have also changed their names.

== Later career ==
Alur's research has contributed to the drafting of government policy towards people with disability. Her 1998 Ph.D thesis "Invisible Children – A Study of Policy Exclusion", also published as a book in 2003, assessed the evolution of educational policy in India for disabled children, with specific reference to the Indian government's pre-school programme, the Integrated Child Development Services (ICDS). Her research found widespread exclusion of children and people with disabilities from services, including from government programmes targeted at vulnerable sections of society, to the extent that nutrition was denied to children with disabilities. Her finding that over 90% people with disabilities (around 70 million people) were excluded from services of any kind was widely cited by reformers in the disability sector to push for improvements in care for people with disabilities.

In 1999, Alur established the National Resource Centre for Inclusion (NRCI), in Mumbai, to integrate disabled children from special schools into normal schools.

Alur was later involved with implementing Education for All (EFA), an inclusive education initiative aimed at children outside the purview of mainstream education. She conducted a longitudinal research project with UNICEF in the Dharavi slums of Mumbai, targeting girls, disabled children, and children in poverty. The initiative led to the design of intervention models at the family and community levels.

Alur and her husband Sathi Alur are involved in the Shiksha Sankalp research project, under the aegis of ADAPT and co-funded by the German Federal Ministry for Economic Cooperation and Development and the Christian Blind Mission (CBM), which aims to identify schoolchildren with special educational needs, and design curricula appropriate for their needs.

Alur started the Mithu Alur Foundation, with the aim of creating an inclusive village model in Maharashtra, via schools, hospitals, medical services and livelihood through skills training programmes, and women's empowerment.

She has been a vocal activist against the exclusion of people with disabilities and has written articles, books and papers propagating inclusion in society. Alur has advocated inclusive education under the new provisions in the Right of Children to Free and Compulsory Education Act, stating that it would benefit all children, not only children with disabilities.

== Works ==
Alur's writing has appeared in many national and international publications, and she has regularly appeared on television news channels, especially NDTV, advocating for the rights of people with disabilities. Her books include:

- Education and Children with Special needs – from segregation to integration, with Seamus Hegarty, Published by Sage Publications, new Delhi, 2002.
- Invisible Children – A Study of Policy Exclusion, Viva Books Private Limited, New Delhi, 2003.
- Inclusive Education – The Proceedings of North South Dialogue I (with Professor Tony Booth).
- Inclusive Education – From Rhetoric to Reality, The North South Dialogue II with Dr. Michael Bach.
- The Journey for Inclusive Education in the Indian Sub-Continent, with Michael Back Published by Routledge, New York, USA, 2009.
- Inclusive Education Across Cultures: Crossing Boundaries, Sharing Ideas, co-edited with Vianne Timmons, Published by Sage, 2009.

== Awards and honours ==
- 1989: Padma Shri Award
- 2003: Martha Forrest Rose Quartz Warrior Award
- 2006:Paul Harris Fellow Award; Rotary International, USA.
- 2009: EMPI – Indian Express Indian Innovation Award.
- 2009: Woman of the Year Award for Outstanding Woman Citizen of Mumbai; Indian Merchant Chamber.
- 2010: Woman of the Year – CNN IBN Super Idol Award.
