= Amu (film) =

2005 film by Shonali Bose

- Film poster
- Directed by: Shonali Bose
- Written by: Shonali Bose
- Produced by: Shonali Bose; Bedabrata Pain
- Starring: Konkona Sen Sharma; Brinda Karat; Ankur Khanna
- Cinematography: Lourdes Ambrose
- Edited by: Bob Brooks
- Music by: Nandlal Nayak
- Release date: 2005
- Running time: 102 minutes
- Country: India
- Language: English

Amu is a 2005 Indian English-language drama film directed by Shonali Bose about the 1984 anti-Sikh riots. The film is based on Bose's own novel by the same name. It stars Konkona Sen Sharma, Brinda Karat, and Ankur Khanna. The film premiered at the Berlin Film Festival and the Toronto International Film Festival in 2005.

== Plot ==
Amu is the journey of Kajori (Kaju) Roy (Konkona Sen Sharma), a 21-year-old Indian American woman who has lived in the US since the age of 3. After graduating from UCLA Kaju goes to India to visit her relatives. There she meets Kabir (Ankur Khanna), a college student from an upper-class family who is disdainful of Kaju's wide-eyed wonder at discovering the "real India". Undeterred, Kaju visits the slums, crowded markets and roadside cafes of Delhi. In one slum she is struck by an odd feeling of déjà vu. Soon after she starts having nightmares. Kabir gets drawn into the mystery of why this is happening, particularly when Kaju announces that she is adopted.

Meanwhile, Kaju's adoptive mother – Keya Roy, a single parent and civil rights activist in LA, arrives unannounced in Delhi. She is shocked to discover that Kaju has been visiting the slums. Although Kaju mistakes her mother's response to a typical Indian over-protectiveness, Keya's fears are more deeply rooted.

Slowly Kaju starts piecing together what happened to her birth parents and mother and daughter clash as Kaju discovers she has been lied to her whole life. As Kaju and Kabir undertake this quest they both discover their families' involvement with the man-made tragedy of immense proportions which took place seventeen years ago in the capital city of India: the massacre of thousands of Sikhs in 1984; after the assassination of Indira Gandhi, the Prime Minister of India. Kabir learns that his father was instrumental in organizing the riots, as well as guilty of failing to stop Kaju's father from being killed. Kabir confronts his father who tries to justify his actions. Keya finally tells Kaju the truth; her birth name is Amu Singh and her Sikh father and younger brother were killed in the riots while her mother hanged herself months later after leaving the refugee camp.

The movie ends with Kaju and Kabir spending a moment in the neighbourhood where Kaju was born before walking away together, while a television in the backgrounds begins broadcasting the start of the 2002 Gujarat riots.

== Cast ==
- Konkona Sen Sharma as Kajori “Amu” Roy
- Brinda Karat as Keya
- Ankur Khanna as Kabir
- Kuljeet Singh as Gurbachan Singh
- Bharat Kapoor as Arun Sehgal
- Avijit Dutt as Neel
- Lushin Dubey as Meera Sehgal
- Subhashini Ali as L

== Production ==
The film's production was marred by obstacles like a reputed production house backing out in the last moment, and threats from local goons during the shooting of the riots scenes.

== Reception ==
A New York Times review, put the film as "the ambitious debut feature by Shonali Bose, wears its political heart on its sleeve and is unafraid to tackle big topics: identity, history, truth, injustice." Another review starts with words, "Needed to be made. Needed to be made. Needed to be made." The Time Out review, while commending the film for "effectively grounding its political concerns in Kaju’s credible struggle for identity," also points out that "it had its share of wobbly moments, and the resolution feels a bit like a cop-out." Further a Rediff review states, "If Fahrenheit 9/11 can, so can Amu." According to the Indiatimes, "What sets Amu apart is its historical astuteness and its creator’s unblinking regard for the past, no matter how brutal."

== Censorship ==
The film faced problems with the censor board in India, which cleared it only with 6 politically motivated cuts, and with an "A" certificate. Since — according to Indian law — this made the movie ineligible to be telecast on Indian television, the producers later reapplied for a UA censor certificate. This was when a 10-minute cut was suggested by censors, including removal of all verbal references to the riots. Subsequently, the producers decided to forgo the lower certification, and released the movie directly to DVD.

== Awards ==
- 2005: National Film Award: Best Feature Film in English
- 2005: FIPRESCI Critics Award.
- 2005: Gollapudi Srinivas Award – Best Debut Director (India)
- 2005: Teenage Choice Award, Torino, Italy (Cine donne Film Festival).
- 2005: Jury Award, Torino, Italy (Cine donne Film Festival).
- 2006: Star Screen Award – Best English Film (India)
