= Center for Detectors =

Advanced photon detectors

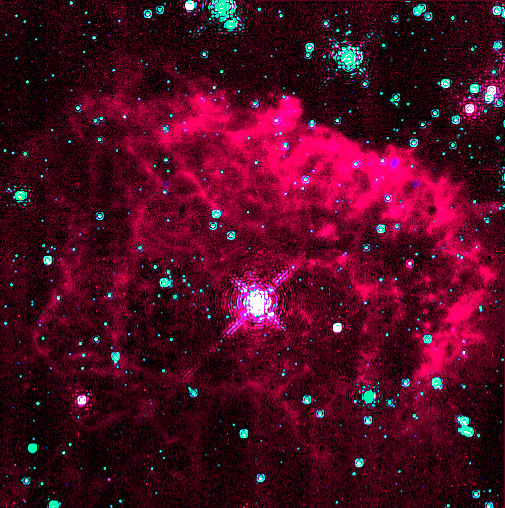
Center director Donald Figer is best known for this 1997 false-color image of the Pistol Star and nebula.

The Center for Detectors (CfD) is a Rochester Institute of Technology College of Science academic research center. The CfD, established in January 2010 by Dr. Donald Figer, began as an expansion of the Rochester Imaging Detector Laboratory. Its mission is to enable scientific discovery, national security, better living, and commercial innovation through the design and development of advanced photon detectors and associated technology.

The CfD designs, develops, and implements new advanced sensor technologies through collaboration with academic researchers, industry engineers, government scientists, and university students. The mission of the CfD is to enable scientific discovery, national security, better living, and commercial innovation through the design and development of advanced photon detectors and associated technology in a broad array of applications (e.g. astrophysics, biomedical imaging, Earth system science, and inter-planetary travel).

== Research ==
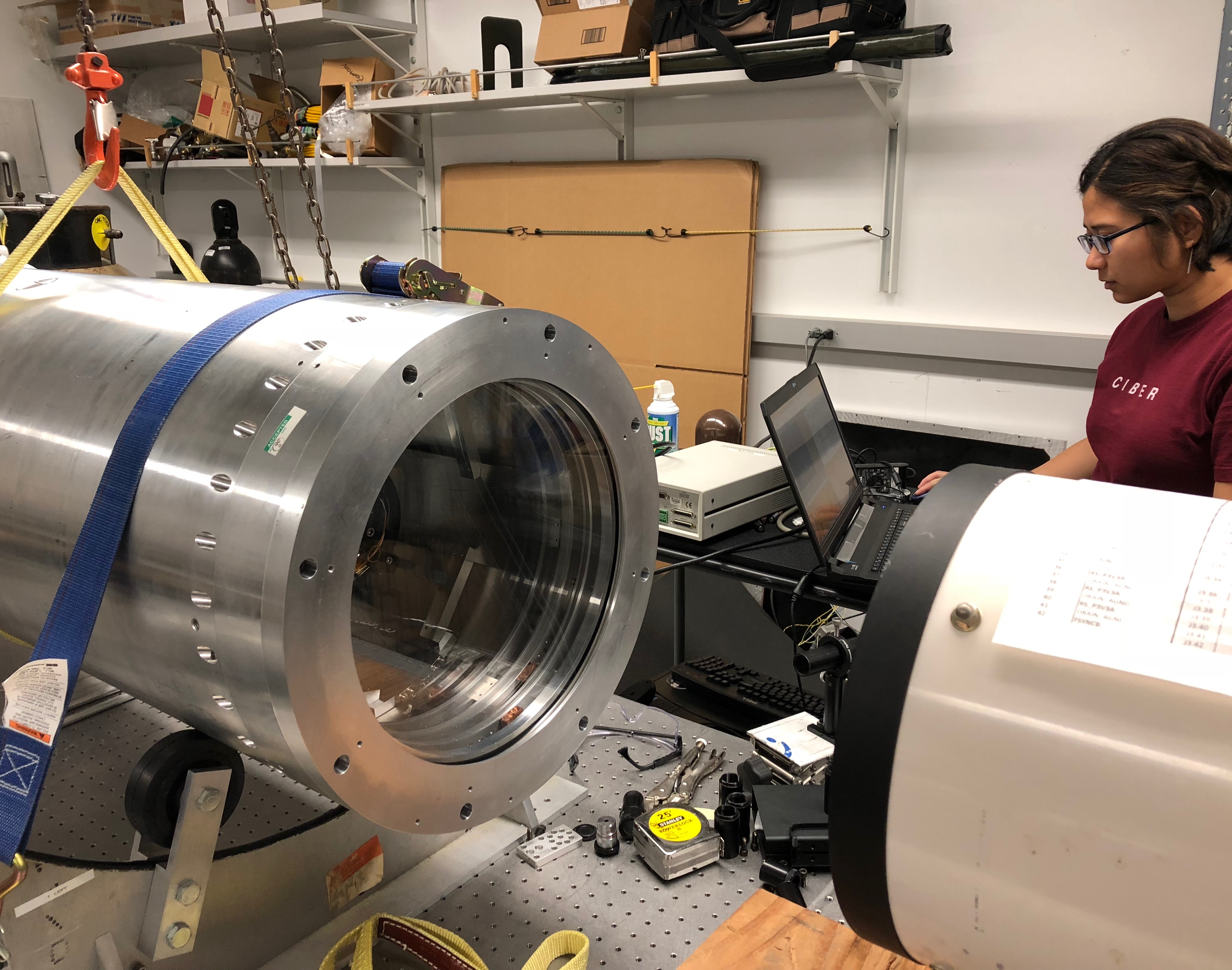
Color image of M13, the Great Cluster in Hercules, taken by CfD personnel using the Teledyne Hawaii 4RG SiPIN detector (HyViSI). This was the first demonstration of this device in an astronomical application.

The CfD uses a multi-disciplinary approach, spanning the many branches of engineering, imaging science, physics and astronomy. Research pillars of the CfD include, Detectors and Instrumentation, Observational Astrophysics, Wideband Gap Materials, Nanostructures, and Silicon Photonics.

=== Detectors and Instrumentation ===
A primary objective of the CfD is the development of advanced detectors and instrumentation for cross-disciplinary applications. Major research projects include the development of detectors that can sense individual photons, cover very large areas of the sky, and have excellent sensitivity in ultraviolet and infrared wavelengths. These devices have specifications that make them ideal for the next generation of large ground-based and space-based astronomical telescopes, for applications such as finding another Earth and determining the nature of dark energy and dark matter. The CfD is also developing two dimensional arrays of micromirrors for astronomical applications.

=== Observational astrophysics ===
This area includes observational research programs spanning the nearby universe of stars and the interstellar medium within the Galaxy to cosmological observations of the large-scale structure of the universe, including studies of fundamental physics. Projects include works that aim to elucidate the nature of the cosmos on the largest scales and most distant times. Other programs include the identification of the upper mass limit to stars and the search for young massive star clusters in the Galaxy. It also includes leadership roles on major future astronomy telescope panels to specify the detector requirements needed in order to satisfy mission science requirements.

=== Wideband gap materials ===
The Semiconductor Photonics and Electronics Group develops III-V and III-Nitride semiconductors for photonic, optoelectronic, and electronic devices as promising candidates for next generation communication and illumination systems.

=== Nanostructures ===
The Epitaxially-Integrated Nanoscale Systems Laboratory in the CfD develops nanostructures using epitaxy of III-V semiconductors on 2-D nanosheets. The research focuses on the growth of various nanostructures, including nanowires and nanofins, by metal-organic chemical vapor deposition through a synthesis process known as selective chemical etching for room temperature benchtop fabrication of flexible III-V nanostructure based optoelectronic and photovoltaic devices.

=== Silicon photonics ===
The CfD Integrated Photonics Group develops photonic technology for broad application in commercial, defense, and scientific applications. It also leads a program for integrated photonics education. This area of research is focused on novel silicon photonic devices with the goal of realizing high performance computing communication, and sensing systems that leverage high speed, bandwidth, and sensitivity to light.

The Center for Detectors benefits from employees that come from a diverse range of academic programs and professional occupations. The CfD staff includes professors, engineers, and students (undergraduate, masters, and PhD).

CfD is grant-funded and has been awarded more than $40M in external funding since 2006. Primary sponsors include NASA, National Science Foundation, and the Gordon and Betty Moore Foundation. Additional sources of funding include Thermo Fisher Scientific, NASA Jet Propulsion Laboratory, ITT Excelis, and Smithsonian Astrophysical Observatory.

== Outreach and Communications ==
Undergraduate students from over a dozen academic majors participate in research at the RIT Center for Detectors. Students work in multidisciplinary teams on externally funded projects. Participation is not tied to grades or credit hours. The “CfD-experience” trains students to navigate research problems with creativity and resourcefulness. Some alumni have gone on to work at SpaceX and Ball Aerospace.

CfD team members have been published in many journals and publications. CfD members were published in over 35 papers in journals such as The Astrophysical Journal and Optics Express in 2018. CfD research was highlighted in popular publications such as the Scientific American and Forbes online. In 2018, CfD members served as expert commentators in articles Astronomy magazine and New Scientist and as expert authors of strategic planning documents for NASA. For a complete list of CfD member publications go here: CfD Publications.

== Equipment and facilities ==
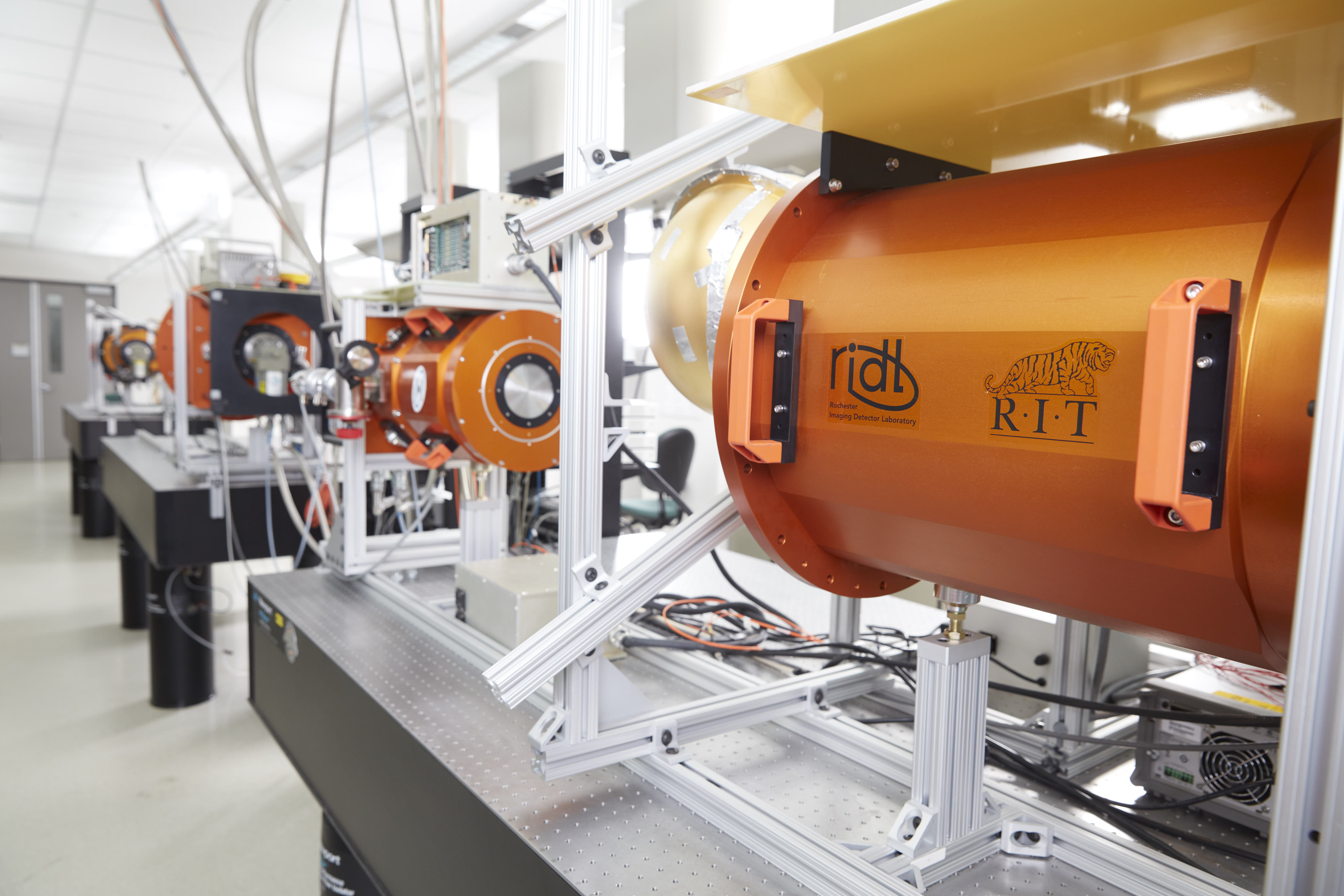
The Center's detector testing system uses custom-built cylindrical vacuum cryogenic dewars.

The Center for Detectors (CfD) is located in Engineering Hall (Building 17) at the Rochester Institute of Technology. The CfD headquarters consists of 7,000 square feet of office and research laboratory space. The lab space includes the Rochester Imaging Detector Laboratory, the Lobozzo Photonics and Optical Characterization Laboratory, the Integrated Photonics Laboratory, the Laboratory for Experimental Cosmology, the Laboratory for Advanced Instrumentation Research (LAIR), the Quantum Imaging and Information Laboratory, and the Electrical and Optical Characterization Lab for LED devices.

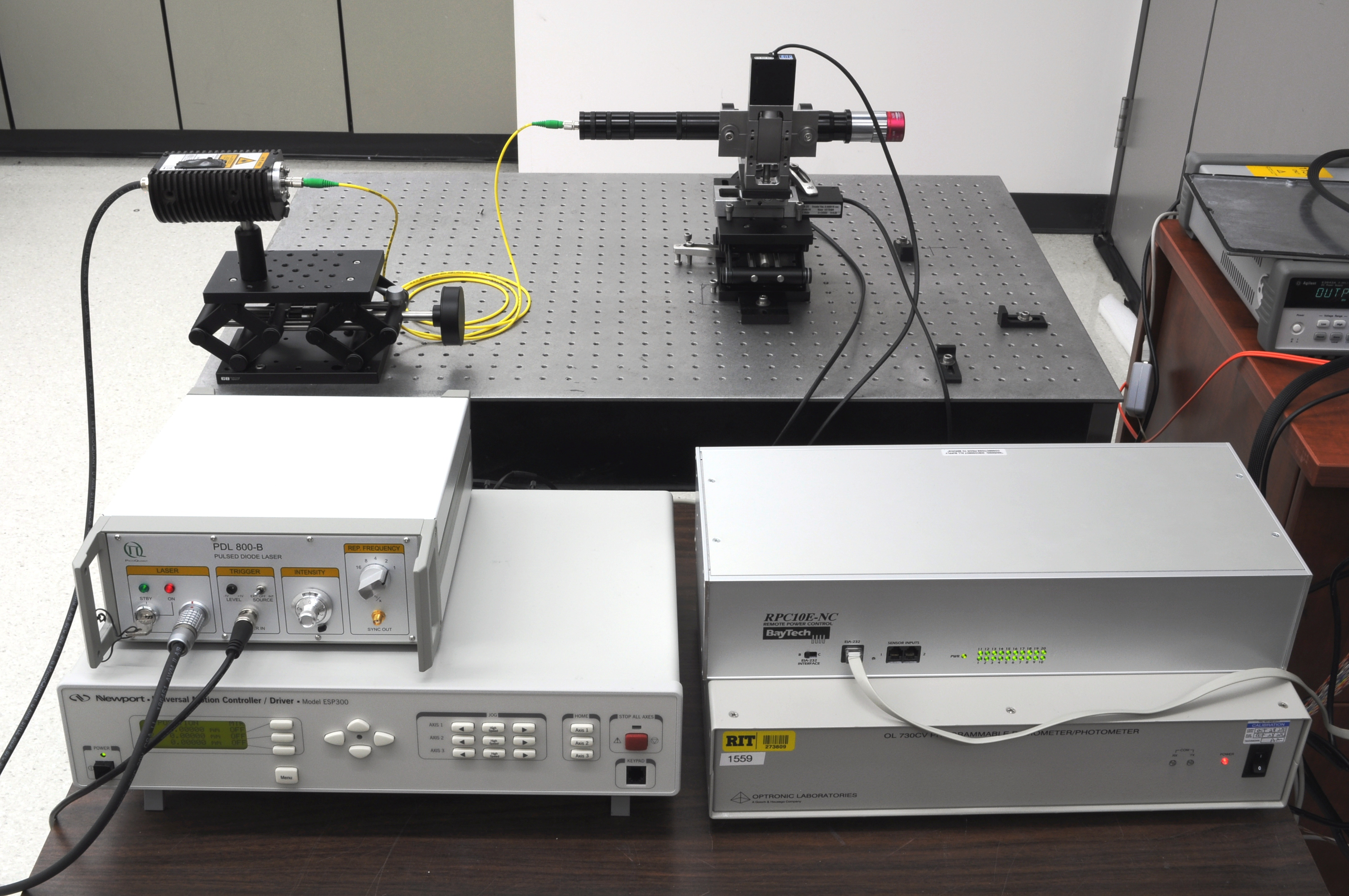
This laser spot projector is used in the Center for Detectors. The system is mounted on a 3D motorized stage that produces a small point source for measurements of intrapixel sensitivity.

Facilities within CfD include a permanent clean room, ESD stations, vacuum pumping systems, liquid and closed-cycle cryogenic dewars, optical benches, flow tables, light sources, UV-IR monochromators, thermal control systems, cryogenic motion control systems, single-photon detector systems, a cryogenic optoelectronic probe station, vibration testing stations, a suborbital rocket payload assembly area, power supplies, general lab electronics, and data reduction computers. In addition to these dedicated facilities, the CfD has access to facilities within the Semiconductor and Microsystems Fabrication Laboratory (SMFL) and other areas across the RIT campus.
