= Chittagong (film) =

2012 Indian film by Bedabrata Pain

- Theatrical release poster
- Directed by: Bedabrata Pain
- Written by: Bedabrata Pain; Shonali Bose
- Produced by: Bedabrata Pain
- Starring: Manoj Bajpayee; Nawazuddin Siddiqui; Rajkumar Rao; Vega Tamotia; Sauraseni Maitra; Jaideep Ahlawat; Alexx ONell
- Cinematography: Eric Zimmerman
- Edited by: Aldo Velasco
- Music by: Shankar–Ehsaan–Loy
- Distributed by: Bohra Bros
- Release date: 12 October 2012
- Running time: 105 minutes
- Country: India
- Languages: Hindi; Bengali; English
- Budget: ₹4.5 crore (US$470,000)
- Box office: ₹31 lakh (US$32,000) (3rd week domestic nett)

Chittagong is a 2012 Indian historical war drama film directed by Bedabrata Pain. It stars Manoj Bajpayee in the lead role and is based upon events of British India's Chittagong Uprising. The film features music by trio Shankar–Ehsaan–Loy and sound by Resul Pookutty. The world premier of film was on 10 April 2012. Chittagong released on 12 October 2012 and nett grossed Rs 3.1 million at the Indian box office. This movie won the 60th National Film Awards for the Best Debut Film of a Director.

== Plot ==
The story is set against the backdrop of a little-known saga in 1930s British colonial India's East Bengal (now Bangladesh), where a group of schoolboys and young women, led by a schoolteacher, Masterda Surya Sen, dared to take on the Empire. Chittagong is the story of a diffident 14-year-old boy, Jhunku. Swept up into this seemingly impossible mission, the reluctant teenager battles with self-doubts to achieve an improbable triumph.

Jhunku, now a 23-year-old youth, is being chased by the Bengal police. He hides himself in a bunker with his childhood friend Aparna. While hiding, he begins to reflect on his past hopes and dreams. The story goes to a flashback to narrate the events that happened 10 years ago.

In 1930, Surya Sen and his followers are protesting the death of the revolutionary Jatin Das. Jhunku is not allowed to join them by his lawyer father, who wants him to study in England. Apart from fearing his father, Jhunku is also torn between his admiration and respect for the magistrate, Wilkinson, and his wife, who show great likings for him, and his fascination for the charismatic figure of Masterda, who is followed and revered by most of his friends. Jhunku, due to his faith in Wilkinson, who is personally against torturing revolutionaries, has great belief in British justice and believes that by getting an English education he might better equip himself to free his country. This causes arguments between him and his friends, especially Aparna. Wilkinson is opposed by the police inspector Major Johnson, who defies his orders and arrests the protesters and badly tortures Masterda.

In protest, some students hit the strict police officer Maj. Johnson (Alexx O'Nell) by spilling oil under his motorcycle, making him fall. Enraged, Johnson makes random enquiries about the culprits but is unsuccessful. However, Wilkinson manages to confirm the truth out of Jhunku, and an enraged Johnson then shoots Sukhen, one of the boys involved. This incident makes Jhunku an outcast amongst his friends, and he becomes determined to avenge the death of Sukhen. Soon afterwards, Johnson is made the DIG of police, although Wilkinson had requested his transfer. This incident further shocks Jhunku. All his faith in his tutor, Sir Wilkinson, is lost, and he joins Masterda's army. Meanwhile, Pritilata Waddedar, a school teacher by profession, is fascinated by the ideologies of Masterda and has great admiration for him. She wishes to join him in his future plans against British rule. She also appears to be in love with Nirmal Sen, but he is reluctant to express his feelings.

Masterda and his comrades Nirmal Sen, Loknath Bal, Ambika Chakraborthy, and Ananta Singh train the 50-odd students and plan to capture the city of Chittagong on 18 April 1930 by disconnecting all modes of communication. As per plan, the armoury of the police is captured by a group of revolutionaries led by Ganesh Ghosh, and revolutionaries led by Lokenath Baul take over the Auxiliary Force armoury. Unfortunately, the machine guns are not located. The revolutionaries also dislocated telephone and telegraph communications and disrupted the movement of the trains. After the successful raids, all the revolutionary groups gathered outside the police armoury where Surya Sen takes a military salute, hoisting the national flag, and proclaims a provisional revolutionary government. The whole town is overjoyed at the success of the Indian Republican Army, and Chittagong is officially conquered by Surya Sen and his boys for one day. However, reinforcements from Calcutta soon set out to capture the rebels. Knowing of the army attack, the revolutionaries leave town before dawn and march towards the Jalalabad hill ranges, looking for a safe place. A confrontation ensues between British-led forces and the revolutionaries, the latter of whom emerge triumphant. In response, the colonial authorities call for reinforcements in the form of machine gunners, who inflict heavy casualties on the revolutionaries. Harish, also known as Tegra, the younger brother of Lokenath and friend of Jhunku, dies.

Soon after, revolutionaries disperse in smaller groups to nearby villages. Ahsanullah Khan (Anurag Arora) from CID comes to Chittagong and cracks down on the revolutionaries. Jhunku is arrested and is severely beaten by Johnson and Ahsanullah during interrogation; he refuses to betray his leaders and comrades. He is sentenced to Kaala-Paani for life imprisonment. In due course, many revolutionaries and police officials are killed in the gunfights, including noted revolutionary Nirmal Sen and police CID chief Ahsanullah. However, Pritilata Waddedar successfully attacks the Pahartali European Club and assassinates DIG Johnson; being gravely wounded, she commits suicide by swallowing cyanide.

After a prolonged search, the police arrest Master Da Surya Sen and sentence him to death by hanging. Thus Jhunku ends narrating the part and says that he was released in 1939 and again participated in the uprisings with Aparna. In one such incident, there is a plan to attack the granaries where the colonial authorities and Indian landlords keep the grain they tax from the peasantry. The British block all the roads to godowns, leading Jhunku to an idea to create underground dungeons till the granaries. Twenty villages join hands and operate. The last scene shows Jhunku being stopped by Maj. Wilkinson, who says he is still sympathetic to Jhunku and wants him to go away; otherwise, he will be bound to arrest him once again. Jhunku signals to Wilkinson that everyone is awake and shows him the mass crowd arising from the dungeons and heading towards the government granaries that forces Wilkinson to retreat. This is named the Tebhaga movement of 1945, which marked the end of British Raj in India. The film ends with the memorable song "Ishaan."

== Cast ==
- Manoj Bajpayee as Masterda Surya Sen
- Barry John as Magistrate Wilkinson
- Helen Jones as Emma Wilkinson
- Delzad Hiwale as Jhunku (young Subodh Roy)
- Vijay Varma as Older Jhunku (Subodh Roy)
- Dibyendu Bhattacharya as Ambika Chakrobarty
- Vishal Vijay as Ganesh Ghosh
- Vega Tamotia as Pritilata Waddedar
- Nawazuddin Siddiqui – Nirmal Sen
- Rajkummar Rao as Lokenath Bal
- Jaideep Ahlawat as Ananta Singh
- Alexx O'Nell as DIG Charles Johnson
- Anurag Arora as Ahsanullah
- Sauraseni Maitra as Aparna (young)
- Chaiti Ghosh as Aparna
- Paritosh Sand as Nilesh Roy
- Tanaji Dasgupta as Rajat Sen
- Arindoi Bagchi as Bhavani Lal
- Shaheb Bhattacharya as Sukhendu
- Tim Grandage as Governor General
- Devina Seth as Kalpana Datta

== Controversy ==
Anurag Kashyap posted a message on his Facebook account accusing Amitabh Bachchan of using his clout for delaying the release of Chittagong, as his son Abhishek Bachchan's upcoming film Khelein Hum Jee Jaan Sey was also based on the Chittagong uprising. Bedabrata Pain, though, said it was delayed due to the distributors suggesting to postpone it despite him preferring it to release before Khelein Hum Jee Jaan Sey. He also said that Abhishek and his mother Jaya Bhaduri had loved the script when he went to offer the role to Abhishek.

== Soundtrack ==
Chittagong

Soundtrack album by Shankar–Ehsaan–Loy
- Released: 2012
- Recorded: 2011
- Genre: Feature film soundtrack
- Language: Hindi
- Label: Yellow And Red Music

Shankar–Ehsaan–Loy chronology
Kyaa Super Kool Hain Hum (2012)	Chittagong (2012)	Delhi Safari (2012)

All lyrics are written by Prasoon Joshi; all music is composed by Shankar–Ehsaan–Loy.

Track listing
No.	Title	Singer(s)	Length
1.	"Bolo Na" (Raga Bageshri)	Shankar Mahadevan	4:57
2.	"Bechayan Sapne"	Abhijeet Sawant, Gulraj Singh, Mahalakshmi Iyer, Sameer Khan, Shankar Mahadevan	4:56
3.	"Jeeney Ki Wajah"	Aarti Sinha, Mani Mahadevan, Kshitij Wagh, Pooja Gopalan, Raman Mahadevan, Shreekumar Vakkiyil	3:42
4.	"Ishan"	Aarti Sinha, Bedabrata Pain, Kshitij Wagh, Mani Mahadevan, Pooja Gopalan, Raman Mahadevan, Shreekumar Vakkiyil	3:52
5.	"The Battle"		2:07
6.	"Inspiration"		1:04
7.	"Masterda"		0:58
8.	"Chittagong"		2:04

=== Reception ===
The album was met with critical acclaim. Kartik of Milliblog praised the album, calling it a "classy opening to Shankar Ehsaan Loy’s 2012 account". DunkDaft quoted about the music as 'A sheer delightful soundtrack for the period film'.

Khalid Mohamed praised the score as "evocative", while Shabna Ansari of NDTV deemed it "soulful".

== Promotion ==
Cinemax Versova held a special screening of Chittagong in Mumbai during 2012. Amitabh Bachchan, Shahrukh Khan, Resul Pookutty and Anil Kapoor were there.

== Critical reception ==
The film was released worldwide on 12 October 2012. It garnered mostly positive reviews from critics.

Srijna Mitra Das of Times of India gave it 3.5 stars. "Like a Chittagong orchid, the movie takes time to blossom – but when it does, it's beautiful. And pleases a certain master" said ToI. Rediff Movies called Chittagong honest and gave it 3 stars: "Chittagong is an important film despite its shortcomings," writes Raja Sen of Rediff. Taran Adarsh of Bollywood Hungama gave 3.5 stars. Aniruddha Guha of DNA gave it 3.5 stars. "Chittagong is the kind of film that will leave you with a heavy heart, and moved. Give it a shot." said DNA. MOZVO, social movie rating site, gave Chittagong 3.5 out of 5 making it a 'Recommended' movie. Shubra Gupta of the Indian Express gave 3.5 stars. Jim Luce of Huffington Post wrote "The film Chittagong is a brilliant, poignant action-drama, made more so by the fact that it is true."

== Accolades ==
List of positive awards and nominations
Award	Category	Recipient	Result	Reference
Colors Screen Awards	Best Production Design	Samir Chanda, Amit Roy, Pradeep Jha	Nominated	
National Film Awards	Best Debut Film of a Director	Bedabrata Pain	Won	
National Film Awards	Best Male Playback Singer	Shankar Mahadevan – "Bolo Na"	Won	
National Film Awards	Best Lyrics	Prasoon Joshi – "Bolo Na"	Won	
Mirchi Music Awards	Raag-Inspired Song of the Year	"Bolo Na"	Won	
