= Malini Chib =

Indian disability rights activist

- Born: 1966 (age 59–60); Calcutta, India
- Occupation: disability rights activist

Malini Chib (born 1966) is an Indian disability rights activist and author who has cerebral palsy. Chib wrote the book One Little Finger over the course of two years by typing with only one finger.

== Biography ==
Malini was born in Kolkata, India in 1966. She had a loss of oxygen during birth causing cerebral palsy. Her parents moved to England after her birth to get better care for her. After her brother Nikhil was born, the family moved back to India. Since no school would take her as a student, her mother, Mithu Alur, started a school called The Centre For Special Education. Malini would later return to England to attend Thomas Delarue School, a boarding school for pupils with cerebral palsy. She returned to India to attend St. Xavier's College, affiliated to the University of Mumbai, where she earned a BA. She went back to England to get a master's degree in Gender Studies at the Institute of Education, University of London. Filmmaker Shonali Bose is her first cousin.

== Career ==
In December 2010, Chib wrote her first book and autobiography One Little Finger published by Sage Publishing. The book was critically acclaimed.

In 2015, she wrote a chapter titled I Feel Normal Inside. Outside, My Body Isn't! in the anthology Disability, Gender and the Trajectories of Power edited by Asha Hans and published by Sage Publishing.

Chib is the founder and co-chairperson of ADAPT Rights Group, a part of the ADAPT (Able Disable All People Together) organisation. The Rights Group was formed with the belief that both "able" and "disabled" should work together to form an "inclusive" society where "all" are welcomed and included.

She also heads the Library and Media Services. She is responsible for the micro and macro advocacy efforts of the ADAPT Rights Group. She lent her skills organizing an 'Inclusive Job Fair' for disabled youth. She also conducts Empowerment and sensitization courses for individuals, corporates, parents, professionals and disabled activists.

== Awards ==
In 2011, the Indian Ministry of Social Justice and Empowerment awarded Chib the National Award for the Empowerment of Persons with Disabilities in the category Role Model.

In 2017, on the occasion of World Cerebral Palsy Day, Chib was honoured with the first global Cerebral Palsy Day Award for ensuring rights and entitlements of persons with disability conferred by the Cerebral Palsy Alliance, Australia.

== In popular culture ==
The 2014 Indian film Margarita with a Straw is based on her life, in which actress Kalki Koechlin played a character based on her. Upon release, the film was a major critical and commercial success, and Koechlin won several awards for her performance.
