= Wideband materials =

Wideband material refers to material that can convey Microwave signals (light/sound) over a variety of wavelengths. These materials possess exemplary attenuation and dielectric constants, and are excellent dielectrics for semiconductor gates. Examples of such material include gallium nitride (GaN) and silicon carbide (SiC).

SiC has been used extensively in the creation of lasers for several years. However, it performs poorly (providing limited brightness) because it has an indirect band gap. GaN has a wide band gap (~3.4 eV), which usually results in high energies for structures which possess electrons in the conduction band.
