= Shonali Bose =

Indian film director, writer and film producer

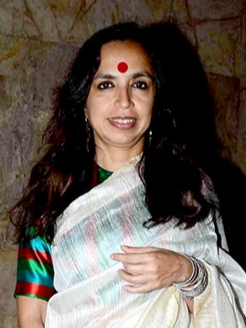
- Bose in 2015
- Born: 3 June 1965 (age 61); Kolkata, West Bengal, India
- Education: The Lawrence School, Sanawar
- Alma mater: Miranda House; Columbia University
- Occupations: Filmmaker, writer
- Years active: 1992—present
- Spouse: Bedabrata Pain (divorced)
- Children: 2
- Relatives: Malini Chib (cousin)

Shonali Bose (born 3 June 1965) is an Indian film director, writer and film producer. Having made her feature film debut in 2005, she has since won such accolades as a National Film Award, a Bridgestone Narrative Award, and a Sundance Mahindra Global Filmmaker Award.

Bose earned her breakthrough with her first feature film, the 2005 biographical drama Amu, which was based on her own novel of the same name. The film which chronicles the attacks on Sikhs in Delhi in 1984, garnered critical acclaim and the National Film Award for Best Feature Film in English. Bose then worked as the assistant director for the 2012 war film Chittagong, which she also co-wrote.

Bose's status as a filmmaker grew following the critical and commercial success of the dramas Margarita with a Straw (2015) and The Sky Is Pink (2019). Inspired from the life of Malini Chib—her cousin and a disability rights activist, the former earned Bose a Sundance Mahindra Global Filmmaker Award and a NETPAC Award.

Bose is also an active philanthropist and supports various charitable organisations. She was married to filmmaker Bedabrata Pain, but the couple separated following the death of their son.

== Early life ==
Shonali Bose was born on 3 June 1965 in Calcutta, West Bengal, and spent most of her young adult life in Mumbai and New Delhi. She earned her Bachelor of Arts degree from Delhi University and master's degree in political science from Columbia University, New York. She has been an activist since her time at Miranda House in Delhi University. Bose was also involved in theatre as an actor throughout school and college. Bose did not originally plan to be involved in film, however she saw it as a better outlet for activism after realizing how far removed her Ph.D. studies were from activism. On her film work she says, "Film is the means with which I want to communicate ideas about social and political change."

== Career ==
=== Early career and breakthrough with Amu (1999-2010) ===
Bose worked as an organizer for the National Lawyers Guild for about a year. She directed live community television in Manhattan before joining the MFA Directing Program at UCLA School of Theater, Film and Television. Early in her career, Bose directed such short films as The Gendarme Is Here and Undocumented, and the feature-length documentary Lifting the Veil; the productions were screened at numerous film festivals.

Bose made her feature film debut with the 2005 drama Amu; she had also written the production's screenplay. The film released in India in January to critical acclaim and positive response from the audience. Amu was screened at international film festivals in Berlin and Toronto. Bose won several national and international awards for the film, including the FIPRESCI Critics Award, the National Film Award for Best Feature Film in English and the Gollapudi Srinivas Award for Best Debut Director. Bose wrote the novel Amu, which based on the screenplay which released simultaneously with the film.

=== Continued critical success (2010- present) ===
Bose co-wrote the Bedabrata Pain directed film Chittagong, a period drama that chronicles the 1930 Chittagong armoury raid. Her 2014 production, Margarita, with a Straw, starring Kalki Koechlin as a girl with cerebral palsy, premiered at 2014 Toronto International Film Festival to critical acclaim. The film won the NETPAC Award for Best Asian Film at the event. She had begun working on the script a year after the death of her son; the film's initial draft won the Sundance Mahindra Global Filmmaker Award, at the 2012 Sundance Film Festival. Bose was inspired to make the film by her real life experiences of studying in New York, her relationship with her cousin Malini Chib who has cerebral palsy, and her and Chib's sexuality as queer and disabled people respectively. The film was originally rejected by the censor board in India, but won an appeal and was released shortly after the ban on homosexuality in India was lifted.

In 2019, Bose has written and directed The Sky Is Pink, a film based on the motivational speaker Aisha Chaudhary, starring Priyanka Chopra, Farhan Akhtar and Zaira Wasim. The film was theatrically released on 11 October 2019 and was critically acclaimed.

She directed the short Raat Rani, featuring Fatima Sana Shaikh, for the 2022 anthology Modern Love Mumbai.

==== Upcoming project ====
Bose has committed to write the pilot episode for an untitled television series based on Diksha Basu's novel The Windfall.

She is currently shooting for the Amazon Original, The Notorious Girls of Miranda House, produced by Pritish Nandy Communications.

== Personal life ==
She was married to Bedabrata Pain but is now separated. The couple's son Ishan Bose-Pain died on 13 September 2010 at age 16. Bose is bisexual.

== Filmography ==
Year	Film	Director	Writer	Producer	Note
2005	Amu	Yes	Yes	Yes	
2012	Chittagong	No	Yes	Yes	
2015	Margarita with a Straw	Yes	Yes	Yes	also Story, Dialogue writer
2019	The Sky Is Pink	Yes	Yes	No	
2022	Modern Love: Mumbai	Yes	No	No	

== Awards ==
Film	Year	Category	Award/Film Festival	Notes
Amu	2004	Best Feature Film in English	National Film Awards	
Amu	2005	FIPRESCI Critics Award.	International Federation of Film Critics	
Amu	2005	Best English Language Film	Star Screen Award	
Amu	2005	Sundance Global Filmmaker Award		
Margarita with a Straw	2015	NETPAC Jury award for Best Asian Film	Toronto International Film Festival	
Margarita with a Straw	2015	Audience Award	Filmfest DC – Washington DC International Film Festival	
Margarita with a Straw	2016	Audience Award - Best Feature	Frameline San Francisco International LGBTQ Film Festival	
Margarita with a Straw	2015	Youth Jury Award	Vesoul International Film Festival of Asian Cinema	
Margarita with a Straw	2015	Audience Award for Best Feature Film	Vesoul International Film Festival of Asian Cinema	
Margarita with a Straw	2015	Feature Film Award - Best International Film	Galway Film Fleadh (Ireland)	
Margarita with a Straw	2015	Best International Feature	Gaze International LGBT Film Festival (Ireland) – Spirit of GAZE Award	
Margarita with a Straw	2015	Audience Award	Montclair Film Festival (MFF)	
Margarita with a Straw	2015	Audience Award for Best Feature Film	Brussels Extraordinary Film Festival	
Margarita with a Straw	2015	Best Film	Grand Prix Jury Award for Best Film	
Margarita with a Straw	2015	Best Film	Image Out. Rochester LGBT Film Festival	
Margarita with a Straw	2015	Jury Award – Best Narrative Fiction	MIX Copenhagen	
Margarita with a Straw	2015	Best Feature Film	Lili Award	
Margarita with a Straw	2015	Best Feature Film	Casa Asia Film Week, Spain	
Margarita with a Straw	2015	Audience Award for Best Feature Film	North Carolina Gay & Lesbian Film Festival	
Margarita with a Straw	2015	Best Film	Utah Film Center – Damn These Heels	
Margarita with a Straw	2015	Audience Award for Best Feature Film	Teaneck International Film Festival - Best Feature Award	
Margarita with a Straw	2015	Best Screenplay	Nashville Film Festival – Bridgestone Narrative Competition	
Margarita with a Straw	2015	Audience Choice Award	Hamburg Gay and Lesbian Film Festival	
Margarita with a Straw	2015	Best Film, Best Script, Best Direction - Filmmaker of the Year	Stardust COLORS	
Margarita with a Straw	2015	VIWIFF Award	Vancouver International Women in Film Festival	
Margarita with a Straw	2014	NETPAC Award	Toronto International Film Festival	
The Sky Is Pink	2020	Best Film (Critics)	Filmfare Awards	
The Sky Is Pink	2020	Critics Award for Best Film	Screen Awards	

== See also ==
- List of female film and television directors
- List of LGBT-related films directed by women
