= Able Disabled All People Together =

Indian disability rights organization

ADAPT - Able Disabled All People Together
- Abbreviation: SSI
- Formation: 1972
- Type: NGO
- Purpose: Neuro-Muscular and Developmental Disabilities
- Headquarters: Mumbai

ADAPT – Able Disabled All People Together (formerly known as The Spastics Society of India) is an Indian non-profit and non-governmental organization, working to help people with neuro-muscular and developmental disabilities. It was started on 2 October 1972 by Mithu Alur, to provide education and treatment services for the "spastics" (children with cerebral palsy).

Today, it has broadened its scope to include programs on teacher training, vocational training of young adults with cerebral palsy, autism, intellectual disabilities, multiple disabilities and learning disabilities. It also works in the field of advocacy and awareness and offers support to parents and other professionals. It has led to the formation of independent Spastic societies in 16 states in India. In 1999, it established the 'National Resource Centre for Inclusion (NRCI), in Mumbai, to include disabled children from special schools into normal schools. The Spastics Society of India has since changed names and is currently called ADAPT (Able Disable All People Together). Many of the state level spastics societies under the aegis of The Spastics Society of India have also changed names since.

== History ==
In 1966, when daughter Malini Chib, was diagnosed with cerebral palsy, Mithu Alur found no proper schools for children with disabilities existed in India. So in 1968, she got trained as a teacher in the field of Special Education at the Institute of Education (IOE), University of London. Back home, she wanted to open a school in Bombay (now Mumbai), and she contacted the then Prime Minister of India, Indira Gandhi. Indira Gandhi asked her to get in touch with actress Nargis Dutt. Nargis Dutt became the first patron of 'The Spastics Society of India' (SSI), which formally started on October 2, 1972

Later a special school for children with cerebral palsy, "Centre for Special education" was set up at Colaba on October 2, 1973, providing education and treatment facilities under one roof. It commenced with just three children — Malini (Mithu Alur's daughter), Farhan Contractor and Imtiaz. Nargis Dutt, remained its lifelong patron. After her death in 1981, her mantle was taken up by her husband, Sunil Dutt.

Today, SSI Mumbai, in its new name ADAPT, runs centres in Colaba, Dharavi, Bandra and Chembur. SSI has spread its services in 16 states, and in cities like, Kolkata, Delhi (1978), Bangalore, Chennai, Allahabad, Dayalpur, Pune and Cochin, where it runs special schools for children with disabilities, and offers vocational training and help for finding suitable jobs to the students, through rehabilitation, communication and speech therapy, counseling, parent training and support programs. Certificate and diploma courses are conducted for special educators, basic developmental therapists and community rehabilitators.

In 1987, the SSI received the National Award for the "Best Voluntary Agency" from the Government of India, and later in 1989, Mithu Alur was herself awarded the Padma Shri.
