= Margarita with a Straw =

2014 Indian drama film by Shonali Bose

- Theatrical release poster
- Directed by: Shonali Bose
- Written by: Shonali Bose; Nilesh Maniyar
- Produced by: Shonali Bose
- Starring: Kalki Koechlin; Revathi; Sayani Gupta; William Moseley
- Cinematography: Anne Misawa
- Edited by: Monisha Baldawa
- Music by: Mikey McCleary
- Production companies: Viacom18 Motion Pictures; Ishan Talkies
- Release dates: 8 September 2014 (TIFF); 17 April 2015 (India)
- Running time: 100 minutes
- Country: India
- Language: Hindi
- Budget: ₹65 million
- Box office: ₹74 million

Margarita with a Straw is a 2014 Indian Hindi-language drama film directed by Shonali Bose. It stars Kalki Koechlin as an Indian teenager with cerebral palsy who relocates to the United States for her undergraduate education and comes of age following her complex relationship with a blind girl, played by Sayani Gupta. Revathi, Kuljeet Singh, and William Moseley play supporting roles. Produced by Bose in partnership with Viacom18 Motion Pictures, Margarita with a Straw was co-written by Bose and Nilesh Maniyar. The film deals with themes of sexuality, inclusion, self-love, and self-acceptance.

Bose conceived the idea for the film in January 2011 during a conversation with her cousin Malini Chib, a disability rights activist, about the latter's desire to have a normal sex life. Inspired by Chib's story, Bose wrote the first draft of a script. After winning a Sundance Mahindra Global Filmmaker Award for the draft, she modified the script to reflect her own perspective, incorporating several personal experiences into the narrative. Bose completed the screenplay with co-writer Maniyar and the advisory council of the Sundance Institute.

Bose was keen to cast an actress with cerebral palsy for the lead role, but eventually hired Koechlin, who learnt the movements and speech patterns of people with the disorder. Filming took place in Delhi and New York City in 2013, with Anne Misawa as the director of photography. The film was selected for the National Film Development Corporation of India's Work-in-Progress Lab initiative during post-production, which was completed in the latter half of 2013. The soundtrack was composed by Mikey McCleary.

Margarita with a Straw premiered at the 2014 Toronto International Film Festival on 8 September. It was also screened at the Tallinn Black Nights, the BFI London, the Vesoul Festival of Asian Cinema, and the Galway Film Fleadh. The film was released theatrically in India on 17 April 2015 to positive reviews. Commentators praised most aspects of the production, Koechlin's performance, and Bose's direction. Koechlin won the Screen Award for Best Actress and the National Film Award – Special Jury Award, and Bose won the NETPAC Award at Toronto. Commercially, Margarita with a Straw grossed over ₹74 million against a production budget of ₹65 million.

== Plot ==
Laila Kapoor is a teenager with cerebral palsy studying at Delhi University. She is an aspiring writer and also composes music for an indie band at the university. Laila develops feelings for the lead singer, but is heartbroken when she is rejected. Moving on from the experience, Laila is overjoyed to receive a scholarship for a semester's study at New York University. Despite her father's reservations, she moves to Greenwich Village, Manhattan with her orthodox Maharashtrian mother, Shubhangini Damle.

Laila meets an attractive young man named Jared, who is assigned to help her in the creative writing class. She also meets a young activist, Khanum, a blind girl of Pakistani-Bangladeshi descent, with whom she falls in love. Laila is enamoured by Khanum's fiercely independent personality and her positive perspective towards her own disability. The two spend most of their time together, filling in as each other's caregivers. Laila becomes confused about her sexual orientation, as she is attracted to men (Jared in particular) while being in a serious relationship with Khanum. She has sex with Jared, only to regret it immediately. Laila does not tell Khanum about this encounter. Oblivious to her daughter's relationship, Shubhangini invites Khanum to Delhi to spend the summer vacation with Laila's family.

Laila ultimately finds the courage to come out to Shubhangini about bisexuality and her relationship with Khanum, both of which Shubhangini strongly disapproves. Laila also confesses to Khanum that she had sex with Jared and asks for her forgiveness. Feeling betrayed by Laila, Khanum breaks up with her and leaves for New York. Shubhangini is diagnosed with advanced colon cancer which has relapsed after previous treatments. She and Laila move past their differences while Laila tends to her at the hospital. The two eventually reconcile shortly before Shubhangini's death. Laila plays a song (recorded by Shubhangini) at Shubhangini's funeral telling how much she loved her and how she was the only one who ever understood her. Laila is later seen drinking a margarita with a straw while on a "date" with herself.

== Cast ==
Credits adapted from Rotten Tomatoes.

- Kalki Koechlin as Laila Kapoor
- Revathi as Shubhangini Kapoor
- Sayani Gupta as Khanum
- Kuljeet Singh as Laila's father
- Hussain Dalal as Dhruv
- William Moseley as Jared
- Malhar Khushu as Monu
- Tenzin Dalha as Nima
- Shuchi Dwivedi as Sameera
- Doug Plaut as Rob
- Jennifer Silverstein as Nancy
- Marco Torriani as Charles

== Production ==
=== Development ===
"Khanum is so striking, just such a fantastic character. And there was this really boring, British boy who lived in America. When I owned the character, writing from being Laila myself, Laila was like 'Are you kidding me? This is the more interesting person ...' But I didn't do it consciously thinking, Laila just fell in love with Khanum and it happened organically, not from me wanting to deal with this issue."

— Bose on Laila's sexuality

Shonali Bose began working on a story in January 2011, on what would have been her son's 17th birthday (he had died the year previously). She worked on the first draft extensively for about a month. Although the main character of Laila is based on her cousin Malini Chib, a disability rights activist, the narrative follows Bose's own experience of losing a family member. She acknowledged the difficulty of incorporating elements from her personal life into the story, calling it a "tough emotional journey". The idea of working on a film about disability was conceived during a casual conversation between Bose and her aunt (Chib's mother), who wanted her niece to work on a similar project aimed at creating awareness regarding the subject. Having grown up in the same household as Chib, Bose was familiar with the discrimination faced by people with disabilities. She was especially intrigued by the general ignorance exhibited towards the sexuality of people with disabilities, and therefore decided to incorporate it into the narrative.

Bose later adapted the original draft into a feature film-length script for Margarita with a Straw with co-writer Nilesh Maniyar. In 2012 the script won the Sundance Mahindra Global Filmmaker Award. As part of the prize, the duo were awarded mentorships from the Sundance Institute's staff and creative advisors, and participated in a Feature Film Program Lab, which is where Bose decided to modify the story. After being told by the advisory board that she was "not in the skin of the character", Bose decided to rewrite the script from her own perspective, instead of solely trying to incorporate Chib's point of view. She said that only after winning the award did she incorporate (unconsciously) her experiences as a bisexual woman in India. Bose and Maniyar worked for two years on the script as it went through more than forty revisions before becoming the final screenplay.

=== Casting ===
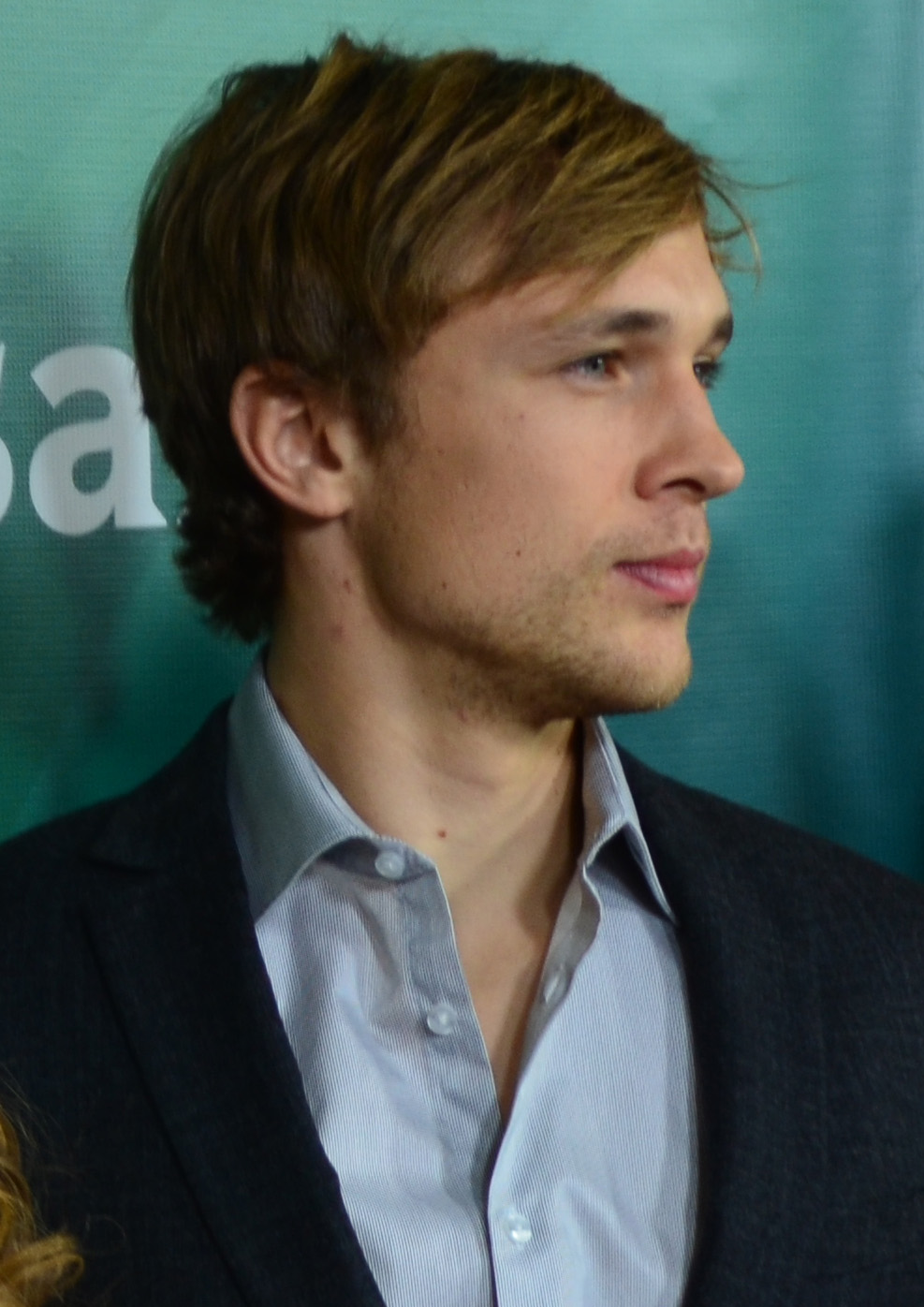
William Moseley plays the love interest for Koechlin's character.

Bose originally intended to cast actors with the same disabilities as the characters of Laila and Khanum. Since there were no actresses with cerebral palsy in India, she held auditions for the role in institutions that catered to patients, but could not find a suitable person to play the central role. Bose also had a meeting with a blind actress in her early thirties to discuss the role of Khanum, a character she associated herself with. The actress refused to pursue the role, being uncomfortable with the sexual content of the script. She nevertheless helped Bose by assisting Sayani Gupta, who was eventually cast as Khanum.

Having decided to cast a professional for the part of Laila, Bose approached Kalki Koechlin, who she said was her "first and only choice" for the role. Since Koechlin was still shooting for Yeh Jawaani Hai Deewani (2013) at the time, Bose began looking for other actresses to play the role, but felt that "something was missing" in each one. She eventually decided to push the filming back for three months to accommodate her first choice. Koechlin admitted that the role was the most challenging of her film career and she took six months to prepare for it. She underwent a six-week training workshop with actor Adil Hussain, which was aimed at making her "body language seem natural", while also focusing on the speech pattern of patients with cerebral palsy. Koechlin spent considerable time with Chib and her physiotherapist and speech therapist. She also attended a month-long workshop in Delhi, where she worked on body part movements. Although the film addresses aspects of the challenges of physical disability, Koechlin dubbed it "a romcom within some hurdles". Bose too described the film as a coming-of-age story about a "woman's journey of finding love".

Maniyar, who also served as the casting director for the film, contacted Gupta for the role of Khanum while she was working on the travel show Yeh Hai India Meri Jaan. Immediately drawn to the character, Gupta agreed to audition and was cast for the role after a lengthy selection process that lasted about a month. She said in a later interview that she had felt fortunate to have bagged the character of Khanum. To prepare for the role, Gupta stayed blindfolded while doing daily activities such as cooking and bathing and spent time with a special voice and accent trainer. She also attended classes at the National Association for the Blind, where she learned basic braille. Revathi, who had previously played a mother to a young child with cerebral palsy in Anjali (1990), agreed to play Laila's mother after reading the script. William Moseley was cast as Jared, a British student in Laila's class.

=== Filming and post-production ===
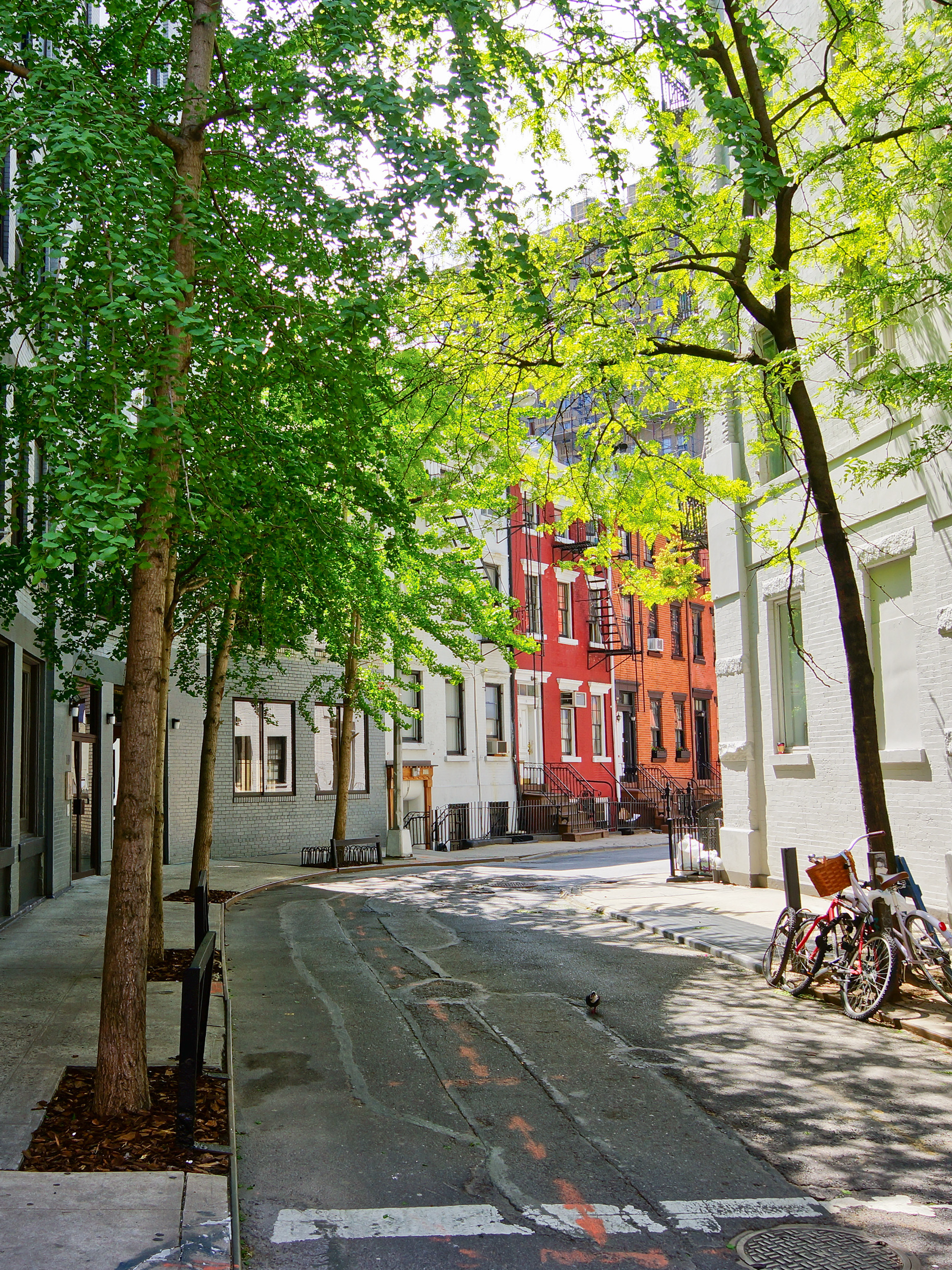
The latter half of the film is set in Greenwich Village, New York City.

Principal photography for Margarita with a Straw began in 2013 and took place at New Delhi and New York with two separate schedules. Anne Misawa worked as the director of photography. While the first half of the story is set in the Shri Ram College of Commerce of Delhi University, it was mainly filmed at Miranda House. Students and staff members from institutions such as Ramjas College and Lady Shri Ram were involved actively in the project. Tenzin Dalha, a final year political science student from the former, played one of Koechlin's love interests in the film; Shuchi Dwivedi from the latter played Koechlin's best friend. Other students from the university were cast as members of a local band, which also included Dalha and Dwivedi. Koechlin's father was played by Kuljeet Singh, an English Literature professor from Sri Guru Tegh Bahadur Khalsa College.

Set in the neighbourhood of Greenwich Village, the second half of Margarita with a Straw was shot during the summer in New York. Filming took place at Roosevelt Island and Coney Island. Snow machines created the artificial environment required for various sequences set during winter season. The crew faced difficulties in filming certain scenes. At one point, the van that was used to carry Koechlin in her wheelchair broke down and had to be manually stabilised during the shoot. Prior to the filming of the sex sceness, the cast attended workshops to develop a better understanding of emotional and sexual intimacy. Moseley, who was especially anxious about his scenes with Koechlin, attended a workshop conducted by Bose herself. The complete film was shot in two months.

Margarita with a Straw was selected for the National Film Development Corporation of India's Work in Progress Lab initiative during post-production in 2013. It was edited by Monisha Baldawa and the sound mixing was done by Resul Pookutty and Amrit Pritam. Certain scenes with frontal nudity were removed during the editing process to avoid a conflict with the Central Board of Film Certification. Produced by Viacom18 Motion Pictures and Ishan Talkies, in association with Jakhotia Group and ADAPT, the film's final cut ran for a total of 100 minutes. Bose had funded the project herself as Viacom18 covered only half the estimated ₹65 million production cost. Another partner withdrew financial support around ten days prior to commencement of filming. Bose had to apply for a personal loan to pay the bills, but was able to complete the film with support from the crew members, who agreed to their payments being delayed. The international distribution rights for Margarita with a Straw were acquired by Wide Management, a Paris-based sales-production-distribution house.

== Soundtrack ==
Music director and singer Mikey McCleary composed the soundtrack for Margarita with a Straw, with Joi Barua serving as the guest composer for both versions of the song "Dusokute". The lyrics for the album were written primarily by Prasoon Joshi, except for the tracks "I Need a Man" and "Don't Go Running Off Anytime Soon", the latter featuring English lyrics written by McCleary. Artists such as Sharmistha Chatterjee, Sonu Kakkar, Anushka Manchanda, Rachel Varghese, Vivienne Pocha, and Rajnigandha Shekhawat provided vocals for the album on various tracks. The first track to be released, the soft rock number "Dusokute", was originally composed by Barua in Assamese and was rewritten in Hindi by Joshi. In April 2015 the complete soundtrack was released under the Zee Music Company label.

== Release ==
Margarita with a Straw premiered worldwide at the 2014 Toronto International Film Festival, where it received a standing ovation. The event was attended by the cast and crew, including Bose and Koechlin; the latter said she was overwhelmed by the response and "loved to see the audiences cry and laugh with the movie". The film was subsequently screened at film festivals across Europe, including the Tallinn Black Nights Film Festival, the BFI London Film Festival, the Galway Film Fleadh, the Vesoul Festival of Asian Cinema, and the Giffoni International Film Festival. Margarita with a Straw had its American premiere at the 2015 Palm Springs International Film Festival. It was screened in Castro Theater at CAAMFest, and shown at the Santa Barbara International Film Festival later that year. The film opened the 2015 New York Indian Film Festival, and also featured at the 19th Busan International Film Festival and the Istanbul Film Festival. Out on Film, Miami Gay & Lesbian Film Festival, and Reeling were among the LGBT events that screened the production.

After garnering acclaim at the international film festival circuit, the producers of Margarita with a Straw sent it straight to the Central Board of Film Certification. The decision to not send it to any of the major Indian film festivals was looked upon by commentators such as Uma Da Cunha, editor for Film India Worldwide, as a part of a marketing strategy. Srinivasan Narayan, organiser of the Mumbai International Film Festival, said that while Indian film festivals have grown they have not yet reached a level where they can compete for international premieres. Instead, Margarita with a Straw had pre-released screenings for members of the Indian film industry in Mumbai. Along with the cast and crew of the production, these showings were variously attended by Amitabh and Jaya Bachchan, Aamir Khan, Kiran Rao, Vidya Balan, Anurag Kashyap, and Shraddha Kapoor. The film was positively received at the time; Bollywood personalities including Khan and Hrithik Roshan hosted separate special screenings for the film.

Ahead of its commercial release, the crew organised several promotional events. In an interview with the Indo-Asian News Service Koechlin talked about the importance of marketing for an independent film, saying that although the content of the films is becoming better, Bollywood remains an industry largely driven by box office gains. Bose wanted the film to be marketed as a commercial one despite its art house appeal; she was not very keen on sending it to film festivals and later asked the producers to avoid mentioning the accolades at any of the promotional events. The official trailer was released on 4 March 2015 on Viacom18 Motion Pictures' official YouTube channel. First look posters featuring Koechlin sipping margaritas using a drinking straw were also unveiled on the same day. The film was released theatrically in India on 17 April 2015. It is available on Netflix.

== Reception ==
=== Critical reception ===
Margarita with a Straw received positive reviews, with some describing the film as "wonderfully liberating" and "an achievement [for Indian cinema]". Particular praise was directed towards Koechlin's performance and Bose's sensitive depiction of cerebral palsy. Saibal Chatterjee of NDTV lauded the honest depiction of disability and was pleased with how Laila's handicap eventually ceases to matter. Baradwaj Rangan similarly found Bose's treatment of disability and normalcy refreshing: according to Rangan, "there's not a trace of stereotype, not a shred of self-pity" in the characterisation, and the most remarkable thing is that "Laila isn't a differently abled person. She's a person who is differently abled [...] human being comes first, the condition only later." Firstpost's Deepanjana Pal was especially impressed by the sex scenes, which conveyed a "tenderness towards the on-screen lovers" without being weird or coy.

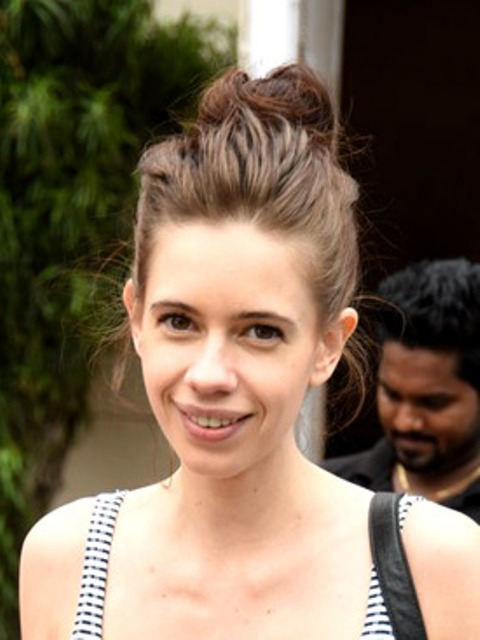
Koechlin's performance was acclaimed, and she received several accolades, including a National Film Award.

Koechlin's performance as Laila drew a lot attention from film critics, who variously attributed her screen appeal to the lack of acting pretence and her "understated artistry". Venky Vembu of The Hindu wrote that Koechlin lent "such verisimilitude to her portrayal of a person with cerebral palsy, that you forget [...] she's an able-bodied actress." Writing for The Commercial Appeal, John Beifuss compared Koechlin's performance to Eddie Redmayne's portrayal of Stephen Hawking in the biopic The Theory of Everything (2014). He wrote that her performance would have attracted Academy Award notice in a major film studio production. This view was echoed by other writers as well. The supporting cast also received positive reviews. Revathi's "finely nuanced" portrayal of a mother was lauded, and her performance was singled out as "[more] compelling" than any other in the film. Writing for the Los Angeles Times, Gary Goldstein offered a mixed response to the production, but wrote that "it's hard not to be captivated" by Koechlin's and Gupta's performances.

Observers also praised the film's technical aspects, while ascribing its appeal to its script, which was "emotionally arresting and startlingly revelatory" and "straight from the heart". Bose's direction was praised for its restraint and its "luminous austerity" and the "expert use of emotions and moments". Many also highlighted the cinematography and commended Misawa for her "judicious work" and "charming frames lit up with an almost dream-like, soft light".

Commentators such as Shilpa Jamkhandikar of Reuters and Mihir Fadnavis of Firstpost were critical of the change of tone and hurried narrative in the film's second half. Although the latter was pleased by the film's first half, he thought that after a "glorious, powerful beginning, Bose fails to figure out a proper resolution." Devesh Sharma was critical of the film's scattered plot in his review for Filmfare. He wrote that it "skips and jumps from one plot point to the other", leaving the viewer unsatisfied. Jamkhandikar similarly noted that Bose introduced "too many contrivances and conflicts" in the narrative.

=== Box office ===
Margarita with a Straw released in India on about 250 screens. After collecting the meagre sum of ₹5 million (US$52,000) on its opening day, the figures began to grow over the following days, largely because of positive word of mouth. The film collected improved totals of ₹7.2 million (US$75,000) on Saturday and ₹9 million (US$93,000) on Sunday bringing the opening weekend collections to ₹21.2 million (US$220,000). It faced competition from other productions, including Mr. X and previous releases Ek Paheli Leela and Detective Byomkesh Bakshy!, in its opening weekend at the box office, but was expected to do well because of the positive reviews. The first week's numbers held steady at ₹32.4 million (US$340,000). The film did particularly well in urban areas like Mumbai and National Capital Region where it collected ₹19 million (US$200,000) and ₹15 million (US$160,000) respectively. This trend was analysed by Shobha De as marking a "dramatic shift in urban audiences' tastes". She made note of the newfound acceptance of unconventional and sexual themes in Indian cinema. Margarita with a Straw grossed a total of ₹74 million (US$770,000) during its theatrical run.

=== Accolades ===
Bose won the NETPAC Award at the Toronto International Film Festival. The production was subsequently awarded the Audience and the Youth Jury prizes at the Tallinn Black Nights Film Festival and the Vesoul International Film Festival of Asian Cinema, respectively. Koechlin won several accolades for her performance, including the Best Actress Award at Tallinn, the Screen Award for Best Actress, and the Jury Award at the 63rd National Film Awards. She also garnered nominations for Best Actress at the Seattle International Film Festival and the Asian Film Awards. McCleary won the Best Composer Award at the latter ceremony.
