= Mark R. Morris =

American astrophysicist

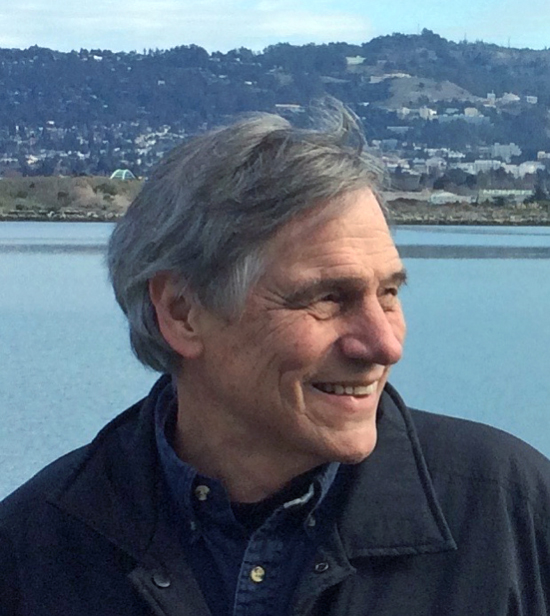
- Born: 1947 (age 78–79)
- Education: University of California, Riverside (BA); University of Chicago (PhD)
- Spouse: Francoise Queval
- Children: 2
- Awards: UCLA Distinguished Teaching Award (2004)
- Scientific career
- Fields: Astrophysics
- Institutions: Columbia University; University of California, Los Angeles

Mark R. Morris (born 1947) is an American astrophysicist. He earned his B.A. magna cum laude at the University of California, Riverside in 1969 and his Ph.D. in Physics at the University of Chicago in 1974. He did his postdoctoral work at the Owens Valley Radio Observatory, California Institute of Technology, and was on the faculty of the Department of Astronomy at Columbia University. Since 1985 he has been a professor in the Department of Physics and Astronomy at the University of California, Los Angeles.

He is a founding member of the UCLA Galactic Center Group along with Eric Becklin and Andrea Ghez. The UCLA Galactic Center group uses imaging and spectroscopic data from the Keck Observatory to map the orbits of stars bound to the Milky Way's supermassive black hole, enabling tests of general relativity in an extreme gravitational environment. Morris received the UCLA Distinguished Teaching Award in 2004.

Morris has worked extensively on multiwavelength studies of the Galactic Center, including a review article and he was co-discoverer of the extended nonthermal radio filaments present there. He continues to study high energy phenomena in the Galactic Center, including an X-ray fountain, radio structures connected to the central black hole Sgr A*, and star formation, including the detection of one of the most luminous stars in the Milky Way.

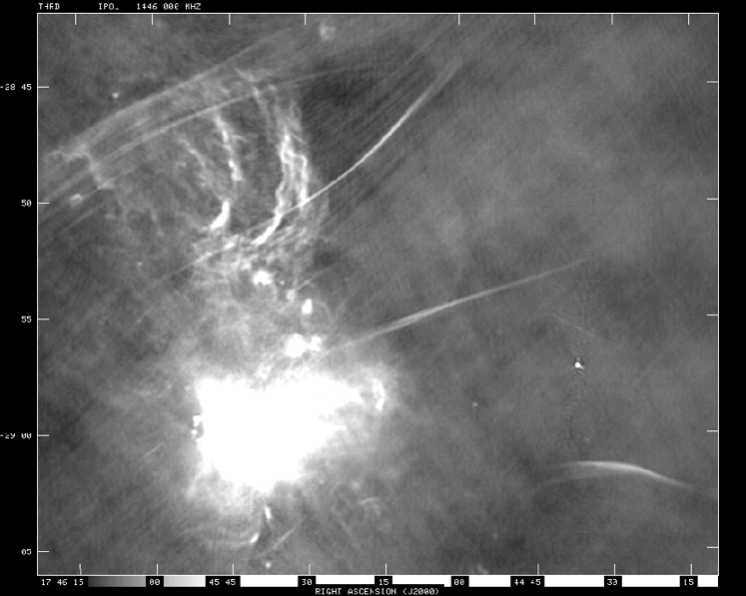
VLA 20cm image of the Galactic center showing radio arcs

His early work included landmark theoretical and observational studies of mass loss in the advanced stages of evolution of red giant stars, including examples of spectacular mass loss in red giants.
