= Mohenjo Daro (soundtrack) =

- Soundtrack album cover

Soundtrack album by A. R. Rahman
- Released: 6 July 2016
- Studios: Panchathan Record Inn and AM Studios, Chennai; AR Studios, Mumbai; Enzy Studios, Mumbai
- Genre: Feature film soundtrack
- Length: 36:47
- Language: Hindi
- Label: T-Series
- Producer: A. R. Rahman

A. R. Rahman chronology
Pelé: Birth of a Legend (2016)	Mohenjo Daro (2016)	Ok Jaanu (2017)

Mohenjo Daro is the soundtrack album to the 2016 Indian Hindi-language period action-adventure film of the same name, directed by Ashutosh Gowariker, starring Hrithik Roshan and Pooja Hegde in the lead roles. The film was produced by Siddharth Roy Kapur under UTV Motion Pictures and The Walt Disney Company India and Sunita Gowariker under Ashutosh Gowariker Productions (AGPPL). The soundtrack composed by A. R. Rahman in his fourth collaboration with Gowariker, after Lagaan (2001), Swades (2004), and Jodhaa Akbar (2008).

The film featured eight tracks with lyrics written by Javed Akhtar. The album was released by T-Series on 6 July 2016.

The music received positive reception from critics and audience. The tracks "Tu Hai" and "Sarsariya" topped the national charts, in all music and video platforms.

== Production ==
In February 2014, it was reported that would compose songs and background score for the film. This marked his fourth collaboration with Gowariker, after Lagaan (2001), Swades (2004), and Jodhaa Akbar (2008). Gowariker's entire team felt that no one except Rahman could do justice to the period favour in Mohenjo-Daro. Gowariker stated "I stayed within the findings from the excavations and the artefacts, while creating a make-believe world and Rahman has helped shape that world beautifully, exotically and believably".

Javed Akhtar was signed to write lyrics for the songs in his second collaboration with both Gowariker and Rahman after Jodhaa Akbar. The film also marked his return as lyricist after 4 years. The music rights were bagged by T-Series for ₹15 crore (US$1.6 million).

Rahman revealed that when Gowariker said Mohenjo Daro, I thought it's going to be like a historical documentary and be so boring. "But then when Gowariker showed me all the pictures, it really inspired me. So I was trying to go to that zone and unearth with my imagination", he added.

"Ashutosh Gowariker has got a lot of very interesting musical sensibilities and he loves the process of creating music. So with him, he picks up the right tunes, picks up the right lyrics and picturises them with so much passion. So it's always a pleasure working with Ashutosh." Rahman on working with Gowariker.

Rahman was also reported to sing one of the tracks in the album (later known as "Tu Hai").

"He took me out of my comfort zone while recording for Tu Hai. When I heard myself at the end of the recording, the first thought that came into my mind was 'Wait, I never knew I could do that!' His vision is extraordinary", Sanah Moidutty on recording "Tu Hai" with Rahman. Sanah Moidutty sang three songs for the film.

== Composition ==
The title track "Mohenjo Mohenjo" was sung by A. R. Rahman, Arijit Singh, Bela Shende, and Sanah Moidutty which was written by Javed Akhtar. The track "Sindhu Ma" was sung by Rahman, and Sanah Moidutty with lyrics provided by Javed Akhtar. The track "Sarsariya" was recorded by Shashwat Singh, Shashaa Tirupati. Rahman and Sanah Moidutty provided vocals for the track "Tu Hai" which was written by Akhtar.

The chant based tracks "Whispers Of The Mind" and "Whispers Of The Heart" were instrumental tracks with vocals by Arjun Chandy. The track "The Shimmer Of Sindhu" was performed by Keba Jeremiah, and Kareem Kamalakar. The track "Lakh Lakh Thora" was performed by Tapas Roy, and Naveen Kumar.

== Release ==
The entire album was released through streaming platforms on 6 July 2023. The music video of song "Tu Hai" was released on 6 July 2023 on YouTube. The music video of title track "Mohenjo Mohenjo" was released on 20 July 2016. Later, on 25 July 2016, the music video of "Sarsariya" was unveiled.

== Track listing ==
The complete track listing of the soundtrack was released on 6 July 2016, on A. R. Rahman's official site.

No.	Title	Singer(s)	Length
1.	"Mohenjo Mohenjo"	A. R. Rahman, Arijit Singh, Bela Shende, Sanah Moidutty	6:22
2.	"Sindhu Ma"	A. R. Rahman, Sanah Moidutty	5:47
3.	"Sarsariya"	Shashwat Singh, Shashaa Tirupati	6:10
4.	"Tu Hai"	A. R. Rahman, Sanah Moidutty	3:59
5.	"Whispers Of The Mind"	Arjun Chandy	4:16
6.	"Whispers Of The Heart"	Arjun Chandy	3:51
7.	"The Shimmer Of Sindhu"	Keba Jeremiah, Kareem Kamalakar	3:21
8.	"Lakh Lakh Thora"	Tapas Roy, Naveen Kumar	3:01
Total length:			36:47

== Reception ==
The soundtrack album received positive reviews from critics, praising Rahman's composition.

Reviewing the soundtrack album, Sankhayan Ghosh of Live Mint wrote "Mohenjo Daro has eight tracks that are full of tribal, folk sounds and melodies and is underlined by the sweeping gorgeousness we associate with the composer's work in period films." Samarpita Das of The Indian Express commented "AR Rahman spins magic".

In her album review for India.com, Akshata Shetty rated the album with 3 stars and wrote "The jukebox of Mohenjo Daro is strictly for classical music lovers. If you prefer listening to peppy beats then you must skip this album altogether. A R Rahman must have researched a lot to create the music for the film which belongs to an era which we have no clue about. Besides, there is no documented knowledge of how the music of those times used to be. But, he has convincingly done a good job."

Stating "AR Rahman's instrumental compositions dominate the soundtrack of 'Mohejo Daro'", Rohwit of The Quint rated the album with 3 stars and wrote "All in all, Mohenjo Daro is an album where instrumentals outlast 'vocal' attempts purely because the former sound more cohesive and simple, the latter however are obvious attempts at over simplifying everything with a lot of distractions and ordinary lyrics."

Suanshu Khurana of The Indian Express wrote "There is everything — tribal sounds, magnificent howls, electronic sounds, pop music, Bollywood timbres, folk and opera — merging together." A critic of Urban Asian wrote "As expected, Mohenjo Daro is a phenomenal album showcasing the talent of A.R. Rahman and all the musicians involved in any of his musical projects. “Sarsariya” and “Mohenjo Mohenjo” can be heralded as the high-octane energetic numbers, with “Sindhu Ma” and “Tu Hai” being more mellow and subtle."

=== Audience response ===
"Tu Hai" was widely praised for its soulful vocals by composer Rahman himself and Sanah Moidutty. The tracks "Tu Hai" and "Sarsariya", topped the national charts, in all music and video platforms.

== Album credits ==
=== Backing vocals ===
Nakash Aziz, Dilshaad Shaikh, Isshrath Quadhre, A. R. Raihanah, Arshad Khan, Sayantan Bhattacharya, Rehan Khan, Arun Haridas Kamath, Mohammad Arshad, Abhijit Patil, Shashaa Tirupati, Aditi Paul, Meenal Jain, Prajakta Shukre, Aisha Saiyed, Aravind Srinivas, Narayanan Ravishankar, Saisharan, Sathyaprakash, Shenbagaraj, Santosh Hariharan, Sowmya Mahadevan, Maalavika Sundar, Pooja Vaidyanath, Soundarya, Veena Murali, Vishnupriya, Deepthi Suresh, Anu, Srisha, Amina, Anushya.

=== Instruments ===
- Guitar – Keba Jeremiah
- Indian Percussions – Lakshminarayanan, T. Raja, Kumar
- Flute – PMK Naveen Kumar, Kareem Kamalakar
- Ravanhatha – Chandan
- Ethnic Strings – Tapas Roy
- Kora – Ishaan Chhabra, Keba Jeremiah

=== Production ===
- Composer – K
- Mixing – Suresh Permal, Jerry Vincent
- Mastering – Suresh Permal
- Mastered for iTunes – S. Sivakumar
- Musicians coordination – Noel James, Vijay Mohan Iyer
- Musicians' fixer – R. Samidurai
- Music production assistant – Jerry Vincent
- Additional programming – Ishaan Chhabra, T. R. Krishna Chetan, Jerry Vincent
- Choir conductor – Arjun Chandy
- Chennai strings orchestra and Sunshine orchestra conductor – V. J. Srinivasamurthy

Sound engineers

- Panchathan Record Inn, Chennai – Suresh Permal, Karthik Sekaran, Srinidhi Venkatesh, Vinay Sridhar Hariharan.
- AR Studios, Mumbai – R. Nitish Kumar, Hari Krishnan
- AM Studios, Chennai – S. Sivakumar, Kannan Ganpat, Pradeep Menon, Krishnan Subramanian, Manoj Raman, Karthik Mano
- Panchathan Hollywood, Los Angeles – Tony Joy, Kevin Doucette
- Enzy Studios, Mumbai Engineer – Julian Mascarenhas
