= Gowariker =

Gowariker is a surname. Notable people with the surname include:

- Ashutosh Gowariker, Indian director and producer
- Sunita Gowariker, Indian model
- Vasant R. Gowariker (1933–2015), Indian scientist
