= Maara (soundtrack) =

Soundtrack album by Ghibran
- Released: 1 January 2021
- Recorded: 2019–2020
- Genre: Feature film soundtrack
- Length: 37:38
- Language: Tamil
- Label: Think Music
- Producer: Ghibran

Ghibran chronology
Ka Pae Ranasingam (2020)	Maara (2021)	Kasada Thapara (2021)

Singles from Maara
- 1. "Yaar Azhaippadhu" Released: 28 October 2020; 2. "Oru Arai Unathu" Released: 20 November 2020; 3. "Oh Azhage" Released: 4 December 2020

Maara is the soundtrack album to the 2021 film of the same name directed by Dhilip Kumar; an adaptation of the Malayalam film Charlie (2015), the film starred R. Madhavan and Shraddha Srinath. The film's musical score is composed by Ghibran, whose soundtrack featured ten songs with lyrics written by Thamarai. Three songs—"Yaar Azhaippadhu", "Oru Arai Unathu" and "Oh Azhage"—were released as singles, before the album was released under the Think Music label on 1 January 2021.

== Development ==
The film's music and background score were composed by Ghibran in his first collaboration with Madhavan. Describing it as a "musical film", Ghibran considered Maara as different from his previous films, which were thrillers and action dramas. Since the film was an adaptation of Charlie, Ghibran took no references from the original film and provided creative freedom to include specific songs which resulted in the inclusion of the songs being different from the original film. The songs were recorded at Ghibran's studio during the COVID-19 pandemic lockdown in India.

== Release ==
The film's music and background score were composed by Ghibran, with lyrics written by Thamarai. On 28 October 2020, Think Music India released the lyrical video of the first single "Yaar Azhaippadhu", sung by Sid Sriram. The second single "Oru Arai Unathu", sung by Yazin Nizar and Sanah Moidutty was released on 20 November 2020. The third single "Oh Azhage" sung by Benny Dayal, was released on 4 December 2020. The full album was released on 30 December 2020.

== Reception ==
M Suganth of The Times of India wrote "Ghibran’s evocative music only enhances the joie de vivre that is an undercurrent of this tale." Sudhir Suryawanshi of The New Indian Express noted "Ghibran's background music and Thamarai's evocative lyrics add so much to such scenes as well." Karthik Keramalu of The Quint wrote "what makes the film watchable mostly is Ghibran’s background score. It holds all the pieces together, as if it were a cupboard of emotions." In contrast, Nirmal Jovial of The Week wrote "The film’s music by Ghibran is average. There is not one soul-uplifting song in this film. The background score is too loud at times."

Avinash Ramachandran in his analysis of Tamil film music in 2021, noted that Ghibran's music along with the soundtrack of Master, "burst with an identity, a soul".

== Track listing ==
All lyrics are written by Thamarai.

No.	Title	Singer(s)	Length
1.	"Yaar Azhaippadhu"	Sid Sriram	4:10
2.	"Theeranadhi"	Padmalatha	4:32
3.	"Oru Arai Unathu"	Yazin Nizar, Sanah Moidutty	4:05
4.	"Oh Azhage"	Benny Dayal	4:41
5.	"Kaathirundhen"	Ananthu, Srisha Vijayasekar	3:14
6.	"Pagada"	Shabir	2:02
7.	"Unnaithaane"	Deepthi Suresh	1:52
8.	"Maara & Paaru"	Ghibran	4:50
9.	"O Ajooba"	Yazin Nizar	4:37
10.	"Search of Soul"	Ghibran	3:34
Total length:			37:38

== Personnel ==
Credits adapted from CD liner notes:

- Music composed, produced and arranged by: Ghibran
- Additional arrangements: L. J. Vijay, Hary Nair
- Backing vocals: Aravind Srinivas, Sarath Santhosh, Shenbagaraj, Deepthi Suresh, Srisha Vijayasekar, Roshini JKV
- Vocals conductor: Gold Devaraj
- Flute: Nathan
- Strings: Rithu, Balaji, Subhani
- Rhythm: Prithvi
- Production management: Andria Miranda, Britto David
- Recorded and edited by: Wesley, Chandrasekaran TK at Aksharaa Sound Forge, Chennai
- Mixed and mastered by Balu Thankachan (20 dB Studios), Abin Paul (Mixwithabin)
- Studio management: Chandru, Ponnaiyan
- Musical assistance: Gold Devaraj, Dr.V.Sritharan
- Musicians' fixer: Sudhakar

== Accolades ==
Award (Note: Awards, festivals and organizations are in alphabetical order.)	Date of ceremony (Note: Date is linked to the article about the awards held that year, wherever possible.)	Category	Recipient(s) and nominee(s)	Result	Ref.
Filmfare Awards South	9 October 2022	Best Lyricist – Tamil	Thamarai – ("Yaar Azhaippadhu")	Won	
South Indian International Movie Awards	10–11 September 2022	Best Music Director – Tamil	Ghibran	Nominated	
South Indian International Movie Awards	10–11 September 2022	Best Lyricist – Tamil	Thamarai – ("Yaar Azhaippadhu")	Nominated	
South Indian International Movie Awards	10–11 September 2022	Best Female Playback Singer – Tamil	Padmalatha – ("Theeranadhi")	Nominated	
