= Maana Ke Hum Yaar Nahin =

Single by Parineeti Chopra Film version by Parineeti Chopra and Sonu Nigam

from the album Meri Pyaari Bindu
- Released: 28 March 2017
- Recorded: 2016; YRF Studio, Mumbai
- Genre: Ghazal
- Length: 4:25
- Label: Yash Raj Music
- Composer: Sachin–Jigar
- Lyricist: Kausar Munir
- Producer: Sachin–Jigar

Music video
- "Maana Ke Hum Yaar Nahin Song" on YouTube

"Maana Ke Hum Yaar Nahin" (transl. I Admit That We Are Not Friends) is a 2017 Hindi language song from the Indian film Meri Pyaari Bindu. Composed by Sachin–Jigar and written by Kausar Munir, the song is performed by the leading actress of the film Parineeti Chopra in her playback singing debut. The film version, a duet, is performed by Chopra and Sonu Nigam.

The song was released on 28 March 2017 by Yash Raj Music. The song received critical acclaim for its composition, writing and Chopra's vocal performance. "Maana Ke Hum Yaar Nahin" garnered four nominations at the 10th Mirchi Music Awards including Song of The Year and Upcoming Female Vocalist of The Year for Parineeti Chopra. Kausar Munir received a nomination for the Filmfare Award for Best Lyricist while Chopra received a nomination for the Screen Award for Best Playback Singer Female.

== Production ==
"Maana Ke Hum Yaar Nahin" was written by Kausar Munir and composed by Sachin–Jigar for the film Meri Pyaari Bindu. It is performed by the leading actress of the film Parineeti Chopra in her debut playback singing. The film version, a duet, is performed by Chopra and Sonu Nigam. The song was composed at the YRF Studio, Mumbai.

Music composer of the song Sachin–Jigar revealed that it was their deliberate efforts to compose the song "ghazal-like in a non-ghazal format, keeping it light and easy. Chopra who is a trained Hindustani-classical singer with a B. A. Honors degree in music, was waiting for the right opportunity to sing in her films. Sachin–Jigar chose Chopra to sing as her character Bindu in the film is also an aspiring singer, so it felt inevitable: "In Parineeti’s case, the actor lives the character, who is a very deserving singer who doesn't find success. The actor is the best person to express the emotions." The melody of the song pans around two octaves.

== Release ==
In February 2016, a small snippet of the song was released in a video in which Parineeti Chopra announced her next film after her taking a break from films. The video in which Chopra provided details about the film, featured Chopra singing a small snippet of the song in the beginning of the video. Chopra announced that she will be making her playback singing with a song from her upcoming feature film Meri Pyaari Bindu where she plays an aspiring singer. She also said in the video that she was rehearsing the song thoroughly to make it perfect.

The song and its accompanying music video was released on 28 March 2017 by Yash Raj Music. The film version, a duet with Chopra and Sonu Nigam was released on 8 May 2017.

== Music video ==
The music video of "Maana Ke Hum Yaar Nahin" features Parineeti Chopra whose character Bindu appears to enjoy solitude after a supposed break-up.

The music video of the film version features the characters of Bindu, played by Parineeti Chopra and Abhimanyu, played by Ayushmann Khurrana.

== Reception ==
The song received critical acclaim and Parineeti Chopra's vocal performance was praised by critics. Joginder Tuteja from Bollywood Hungama praised the composition calling it "the highlight song of Meri Pyaari Bindu". Tuteja further praised Chopra's singing writing "she does a really good job in rendering this one. The kind of ‘thehrav’ that she brings with her singing here is truly remarkable. India West publication also lauded the song and Chopra's singing: "The piece-de-resistance of this sweet score is “Maana Ke Hum Yaar Nahin” – a stunning rendition by the husky and fully trained Parineeti Chopra. The ‘mukhda’ is a killer." Daily News and Analysis praised the writing of the song noting "Lyricist Kausar Munir is the star of this piece. Parineeti Chopra’s voice is clean, raw and breathes in this ghazal-inspired composition. B-Town composers should create more such songs."

The Times of India called the song "a soul-stirring number", adding that "Parineeti has done justice to the soft, soulful track that talks of the bittersweet journey of love." Glamsham wrote that "Parineeti impresses with her vocal prowess in the simple and heartwarming ghazal 'Maana Ke Hum Yaar' and the sheer simplicity of the lyrics, lovely flowing tune and background arrangements lend that nice authentic vintage touch to the composition."

== Accolades ==
Award Ceremony	Category	Recipient	Result	Ref.(s)
63rd Filmfare Awards	Best Lyricist	Kausar Munir	Nominated	
10th Mirchi Music Awards	Song of The Year	"Maana Ke Hum Yaar Nahin"	Nominated	
10th Mirchi Music Awards	Music Composer of The Year	Sachin–Jigar	Nominated	
10th Mirchi Music Awards	Lyricist of The Year	Kausar Munir	Nominated	
10th Mirchi Music Awards	Upcoming Female Vocalist of The Year	Parineeti Chopra	Nominated	
2017 Screen Awards	Best Female Playback Singer	Parineeti Chopra	Nominated	
