= Meri Pyaari Bindu =

2017 Indian film by Akshay Roy

- Theatrical release poster
- Directed by: Akshay Roy
- Written by: Soumik Sen; Suportim Sengupta
- Produced by: Maneesh Sharma
- Starring: Parineeti Chopra; Ayushmann Khurrana
- Cinematography: Tushar Kanti Ray
- Edited by: Shweta Venkat Matthew
- Music by: Sachin–Jigar
- Production company: Yash Raj Films
- Distributed by: Yash Raj Films
- Release date: 12 May 2017
- Running time: 119 minutes
- Country: India
- Language: Hindi
- Budget: ₹22 crores
- Box office: ₹17.79 crores

Meri Pyaari Bindu (transl. My Dear Bindu) is a 2017 Indian Hindi-language romantic drama film, written by Suprotim Sengupta and directed by Akshay Roy. The film stars Parineeti Chopra and Ayushmann Khurrana in lead roles.

The story follows the complicated relationship between a writer, Abhimanyu (Khurrana), and his childhood love, Bindu (Chopra), who is an aspiring singer.

Meri Pyaari Bindu was released worldwide on 12 May 2017 to mixed-to-positive reviews, with praise for its novel concept, and the lead pair's chemistry and performances, but criticism for its narrative and pacing. However, the film emerged as a commercial disappointment at the box-office, grossing ₹17.7 crore worldwide against a budget of ₹22 crore.

At the 63rd Filmfare Awards, Meri Pyaari Bindu received 2 nominations – Best Lyricist (Kausar Munir for the song "Maana Ke Hum Yaar Nahin") and Best Female Playback Singer (Monali Thakur for the song "Khol De Baahein").

== Plot ==
Abhimanyu 'Abhi' Roy, a renowned writer, has hit a creative block and is unable to write a new novel. His manager urges him to complete the novel quickly. In response, Abhi decides to take a break and moves back to his house in Kolkata, with the added intention of attending a birthday party there.

Abhi reminisces about his childhood, when Bindu Shankaranarayan, an aspiring singer, moved into his neighborhood. The two quickly bonded and became best friends. Abhi secretly fell in love with Bindu, much to his mother's dismay. However, he never expressed his true feelings to Bindu, choosing instead to remain happy as her friend.

One day, tragedy struck when Bindu's mother died in an accident. Heartbroken, Bindu blamed her father, who had been driving the car while drunk. Her growing resentment towards him led her to leave college and move to Melbourne. Meanwhile, Abhi graduated and went to Bangalore to pursue a Master of Business Administration (MBA). Despite the distance, they stayed in touch through letters and postcards, during which Bindu revealed that she was engaged (a relationship she eventually ended). Over time, their communication stopped.

A few years later, Abhi travels to Goa, where he unexpectedly meets Bindu again. Bindu tells him she is engaged for the third time and genuinely likes the man. Abhi, heartbroken, returns to Mumbai, where he works in a bank but continues to stay in touch with Bindu.

One day, Bindu calls Abhi to a restaurant and reveals that her engagement has fallen through, as the man left her. Abhi tries to mend their friendship and goes out of his way to support Bindu. His girlfriend leaves him, frustrated that he is always preoccupied with Bindu. Bindu begins working as a dubbing artist, and the two spend more time together, eventually falling in love. Bindu’s dream of becoming a singer finally comes true, but her album fails commercially. Devastated by the failure, Bindu distances herself, causing tension in their relationship. Abhi proposes marriage, but Bindu refuses, stating that she isn’t happy and needs to discover herself. She leaves for Bangalore, apologizing repeatedly to Abhi through emails, to which he never replies.

Two years later, Abhi becomes a successful writer, known for his erotic horror novels. On the day his first novel is published, he receives a call from Bindu, who informs him that she is getting married. Hurt, Abhi tells her he is happy for her and wishes her well.

As the story returns to the present, it is raining in Kolkata, and Abhi takes shelter in a spot where he and Bindu used to spend time. He unexpectedly meets a young girl, who turns out to be Bindu's daughter. Bindu is now married to Mr. Nair. Abhi shows Bindu a manuscript of his love story with her, which has a happy ending. He tells her that the manuscript belongs only to him and Bindu and that no one else should read it.

The film concludes with Abhi and Bindu dancing together at the birthday party, as Abhi reflects that while Bindu may now be someone's mother, daughter-in-law, or wife, for him, she will always be the same dear Bindu he met in his childhood.

== Cast ==
- Parineeti Chopra as Bindu Shankarnarayanan
- Ayushmann Khurrana as Abhimanyu "Abhi" Roy a.k.a. Bubla
- Rajatava Dutta as Bubla's father
- Aparajita Adhya as Bubla's mother
- Prakash Belawadi as Bindu's father
- June Malia as Bindu's mother
- Kharaj Mukherjee as over-excited relative
- Biswajit Chakraborty as a neighbor
- Kamalika Banerjee as Boobi Mashi
- Abish Mathew as Bubla's friend in Mumbai
- Lama Halder as shopkeeper
- Prabal Punjabi
- Amrita Bagchi as Abhimanyu's girlfriend
- Nishant Dahiya
- Priya Mondal
- Ishita Ganguly as Das Cabin Girl – Prospective Bride for Abhimanyu

== Production ==
Principal photography for the film took place in Kolkata, beginning in May 2016, and wrapped up by October 2016.

== Box office ==
The film had a total gross collection of ₹179 million (US$1.9 million).

== Soundtrack ==
Meri Pyaari Bindu

Soundtrack album by Sachin–Jigar
- Released: 20 April 2017
- Recorded: 2016–2017
- Genre: Feature film soundtrack
- Length: 30:26
- Language: Hindi
- Label: YRF Music

The film soundtrack of Meri Pyaari Bindu is composed by Sachin–Jigar with lyrics by Kausar Munir and Priya Saraiya. The songs in the film has been sung by Arijit Singh, Ayushmann Khurrana, Sonu Nigam, Parineeti Chopra, Clinton Cerejo, Dominique Cerejo, Monali Thakur, Nakash Aziz, Sanah Moidutty, Jigar Saraiya and Jonita Gandhi. Chopra recorded her first song "Maana Ke Hum Yaar Nahin" for the film. The full soundtrack, which consists of seven songs was released on 20 April 2017.

All music is composed by Sachin–Jigar.

Track listing
No.	Title	Lyrics	Singer(s)	Length
1.	"Maana Ke Hum Yaar Nahin"	Kausar Munir	Parineeti Chopra	4:25
2.	"Hareyaa"	Priya Saraiya	Arijit Singh	3:35
3.	"Ye Jawaani Teri"	Kausar Munir	Nakash Aziz, Jonita Gandhi	3:15
4.	"Iss Tarah"	Kausar Munir	Clinton Cerejo, Dominique Cerejo	3:03
5.	"Khol De Baahein"	Kausar Munir, Rana Mazumder	Monali Thakur	3:09
6.	"Afeemi"	Kausar Munir	Jigar Saraiya, Sanah Moidutty	4:09
7.	"Maana Ke Hum Yaar Nahin" (Duet)	Kausar Munir	Sonu Nigam, Parineeti Chopra	5:27
8.	"Hareyaa (Reprise)"	Priya Saraiya	Ayushmann Khurrana	3:23
9.	"Maana Ke Hum Yaar Nahin (Arijit Singh Version)"	Kausar Munir	Arijit Singh	5:26
10.	"Titli Trippin"	Vayu	Arijit Singh, Neeti Mohan	2:15
Total length:				37:15

== Reception ==
On the review aggregator website Rotten Tomatoes, the film holds an approval rating of 44% based on 9 reviews, and an average rating of 5.38/10.

== Accolades ==
Award Ceremony	Category	Recipient	Result	Ref.(s)
63rd Filmfare Awards	Best Lyricist	Kausar Munir – "Maana Ke Hum Yaar Nahin"	Nominated	
63rd Filmfare Awards	Best Female Playback Singer	Monali Thakur – "Khol De Baahein"	Nominated	
2018 Zee Cine Awards	Best Lyricist	Kausar Munir – "Maana Ke Hum Yaar Nahin"	Nominated	
10th Mirchi Music Awards	Song of The Year	"Maana Ke Hum Yaar Nahin"	Nominated	
10th Mirchi Music Awards	Music Composer of The Year	Sachin–Jigar – "Maana Ke Hum Yaar Nahin (Duet)"	Nominated	
10th Mirchi Music Awards	Lyricist of The Year	Kausar Munir – "Maana Ke Hum Yaar Nahin (Duet)"	Nominated	
10th Mirchi Music Awards	Upcoming Female Vocalist of The Year	Parineeti Chopra – "Maana Ke Hum Yaar Nahin"	Nominated	
10th Mirchi Music Awards	Best Song Producer (Programming & Arranging)	Sachin–Jigar – "Haareya"	Nominated	
