= Sanah Moidutty =

Indian singer songwriter (born 1991)

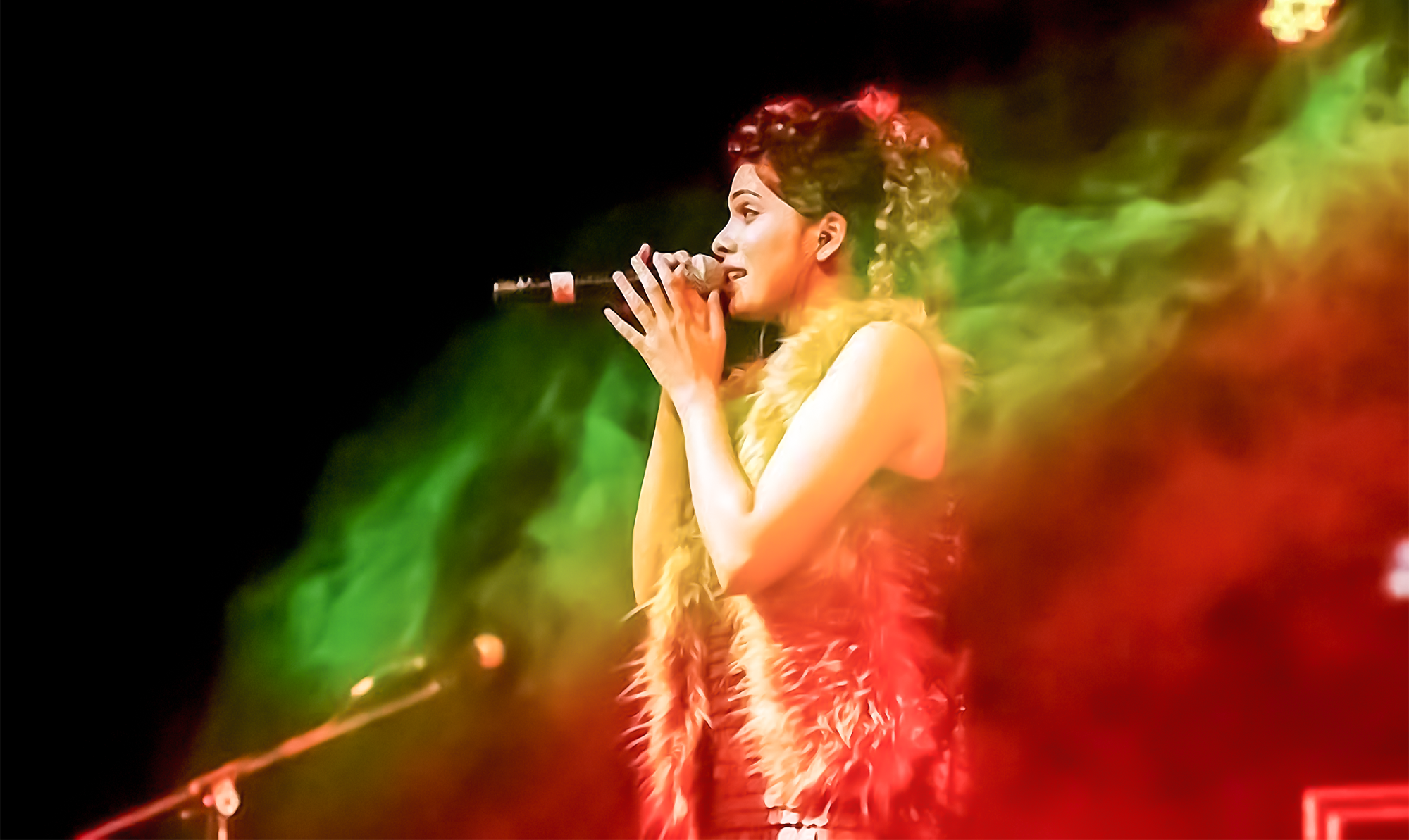
- Moidutty live in concert

Background information
- Born: Mumbai, Maharashtra, India
- Genres: Film, Indi Pop, Carnatic, Hindustani, Western
- Occupation: Singer
- Instrument: Piano
- Years active: 2000–present

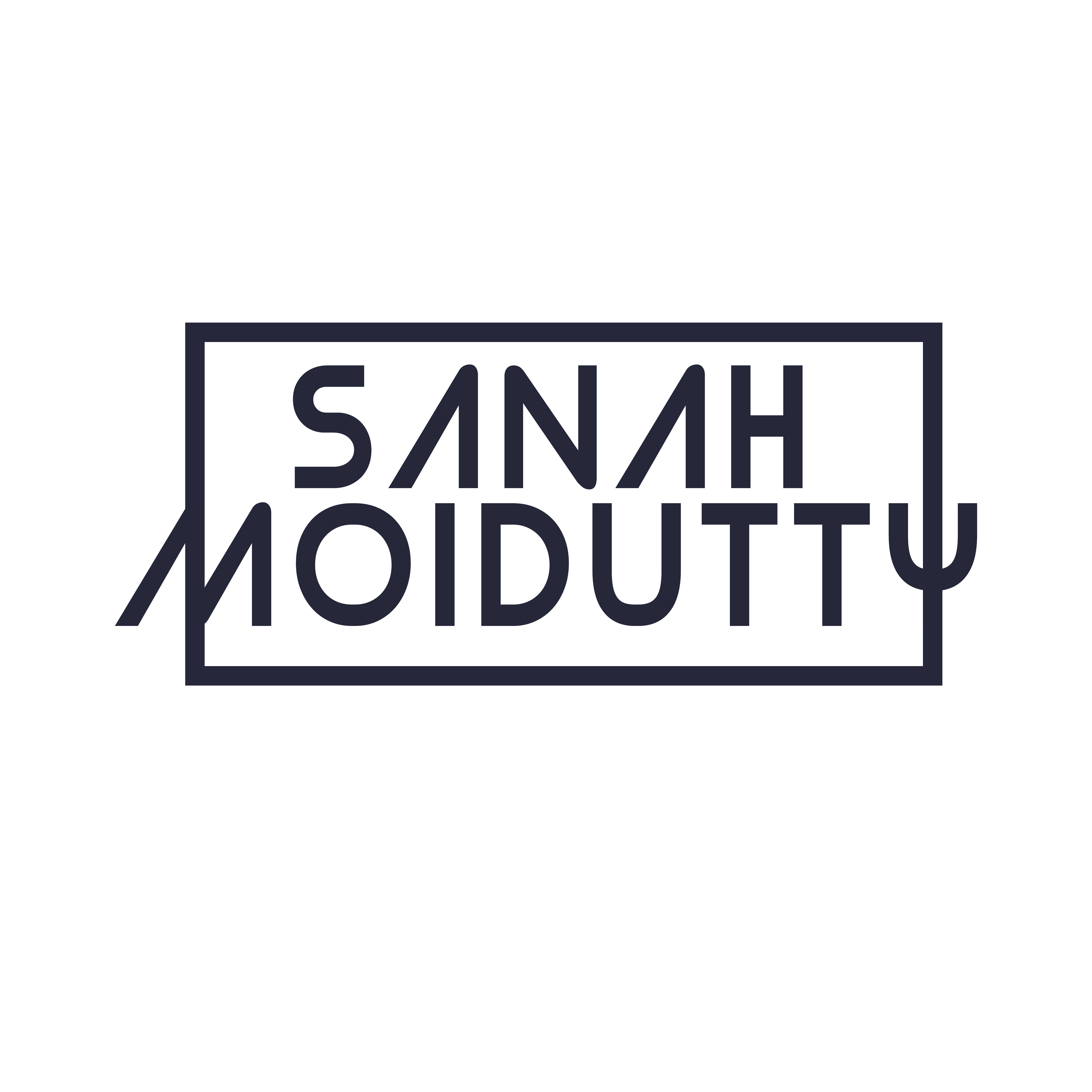
Official Logo

Sanah Moidutty is an Indian singer songwriter. She has been trained in Carnatic and Hindustani classical music as well as western vocals, and performs Indian classical and Indi-pop music.

== Early life ==
Sanah was born in Mumbai in a Malayali family from Kerala. Her talent was identified by her mother who encouraged her to learn music. She has been trained in Carnatic classical music for 6 years under Sundari Gopalakrishnan, Hindustani classical music for 7 years under Madhuvanti Pethe, and Western vocals from Samantha Edwards. Sanah was also briefly trained under Ustad Ghulam Mustafa Khan sahab. She stood to be the 1st runner up in the Hindustan Times "Voice of Mumbai" in 2007.

== Career ==
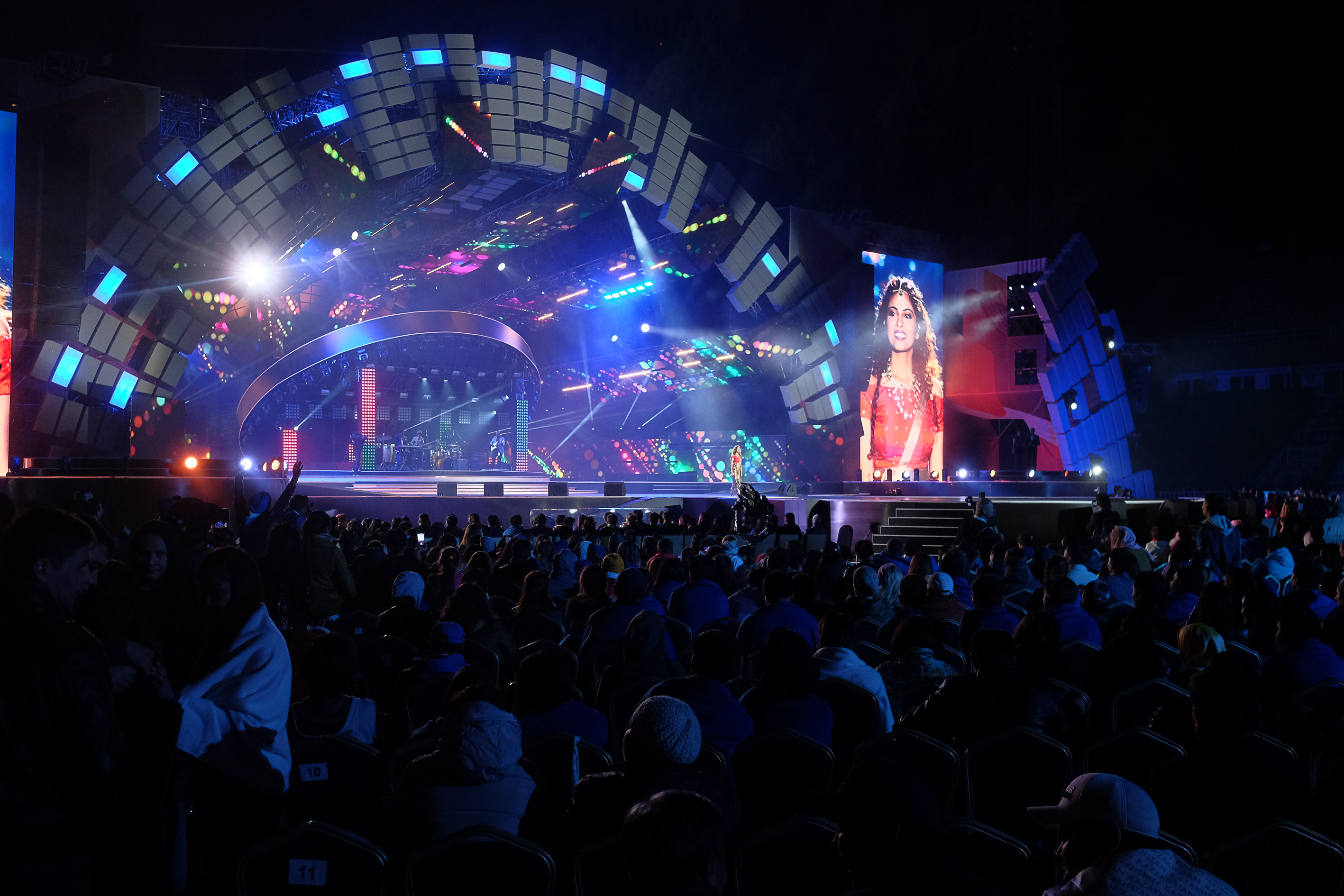
Sanah Moidutty at Star of Asia Almati

In 2012, Sanah decided to start her YouTube channel. She uploaded the first video of her rendition of the song Manmarziyan in 2013. This was followed by O Rangrezz from Bhaag Milkha Bhaag. Shankar–Ehsaan-Loy, the author of the original, liked Sanah's version, as did AR Rahman. Subsequently, Sanah sang three songs for AR Rahman in the following year.

Sanah has rendered her voice in Hindi films like Always Kabhi Kabhi, Gori Tere Pyaar Mein, The Attacks of 26/11, 24, Mohenjo Daro. In 2017, Hindustan Times reported that her popularity in the film industry and on YouTube has been on the rise.

She has also sung in advertisements, working for the deodorant brands Cinthol and Eva. An episode of the musical TV show Sound Trek features Sanah with Achint Thakkar on Fox Life where they recreate the 70's Bollywood song "Kitna Pyara Vada". In 2016 Sanah was also commissioned to create a cover of "Counting Stars" for the Bombay Festival. She has done solo live shows, as well as shows with Vishal–Shekhar, Band SANAM, Keerthi Sagathia and Ash King. She can sing in English, Hindi, Marathi, Tamil, Malayalam, Telugu, Bengali, Punjabi, Gujarati and Kannada. As a part of Jammin, a digital music collaboration, Sanah has done a collaboration called "Ishq Abhi Bhi" with Bollywood composer Clinton Cerejo, and a collaboration called "Yaara" composed by A R Rahman.

In 2017, Sanah Moidutty performed in Almaty, Kazakhstan, at a two-day "Star of Asia" international festival that had the best, voices, sounds and rhythms from the Asian region. She has been learning Hindustani classical with Sunil Borgaonkar Ji. In November 2017, she was awarded "Best Singing Sensation" for the year 2017 at the Asia Vision Movie Awards 2017 for the song Afeemi from Meri Pyaari Bindu.

== Discography ==
=== Films ===
Year	Song(s)	Album	Composer(s)	Co-singers
2011	Always Kabhi Kabhi- Title Track	Always Kabhi Kabhi	Shree D and Ashish Rego	Bhavin Dhanak
2013	Moto Ghotalo	Gori Tere Pyaar Mein	Vishal–Shekhar	Sukhwinder Singh
2013	Raghupati Raghav	Attacks of 26/11	Vishal R. Khosla	—
2016	Mei Nigara (Tamil)	24	A R Rahman	Sid Sriram, Jonita Gandhi
2016	Tu Hai	Mohenjo Daro	A R Rahman	A R Rahman
2016	Sindhu Ma	Mohenjo Daro	A R Rahman	A R Rahman
2016	Mohenjo Mohenjo	Mohenjo Daro	A R Rahman	Arijit Singh, Bela Shende, A R Rahman
2017	Afeemi	Meri Pyaari Bindu	Sachin–Jigar	Jigar Saraiya
2017	Abhaal	Rangeela Rayabaa	Nishaad Golambre	—
2019	Matvaare	India's Most Wanted	Amit Trivedi	Jubin Nautiyal
2019	Kannale Kannale	Market Raja MBBS	Simon K King	Yazin Nizar
2020	Athira Raavil	Anandakalyanam	Rajesh Babu K	K. S. Harisankar
2020	Eadaninmadhu	Varayan	Prakash Alex	—
2020	Oru Arai Unathu	Maara	Ghibran	Yazin Nizar
2021	Hayakki Baby	Kapatadhaari	Simon K King	—
2022	Oohicha Ledhu Kadhe	Highway	Simon K King	Yazin Nizar
2022	Chol	PS-1 (Malayalam)	A R Rahman	—
2022	Shvaas Kasa Ha - Reprise	Dhondi Champya	Saurabh Shetye and Durgesh Khot	Saurabh Shetye

=== Independent Singles ===
Year	Song(s)	Album	Composer(s)
2013	Manmarziyan (Rendition)	Lootera	Amit Trivedi
2013	O Rangrez (Rendition)	Bhaag Milkha Bhaag	Shankar Ehsan Loy
2014	Zehnaseeb (Rendition)	Hasee Toh Phasee	Vishal–Shekhar
2015	Tere Mere Milan Ki yeh Raina (Rendition)	Abhimaan	S D Burman
2015	Photograph (Rendition)	—	Ed Sheeran
2016	Nindiya (Rendition)	Sarabjit	Shashi Suman
2016	Dil hai ki maanta nahi (Rendition)	Dil hai ki maanta nahi	Nadeem-Shravan
2016	Kehna Hi Kya (Rendition)	Bombay	A R Rahman
2016	Chandni Raatein (Rendition)	Dupatta	Firoz Nizami
2017	Ena Sona (Rendition)	OK Jaanu	A R Rahman
2017	Jia Jale (Rendition)	Dil Se	A R Rahman
2017	Jaane Jaan Dhoondta (Rendition)	Jawaani Deewani	R D Burman
2017	Ponvene (Rendition)	Thalavattam	Raghu Kumar & Rajamani
2017	Poomaname (Rendition)	Nirakkootu	Shyam
2017	Jashn E Bahara (Rendition)	Jodha Akbar	A R Rahman
2018	Dil Diyan Gallan (Rendition)	Tiger Zinda Hai	Vishal–Shekhar
2018	Baahon Ke Darmiyan (Rendition)	Khamoshi	Jatin–Lalit
2018	Shyama Meghame (Rendition)	Adhipan	Shyam
2018	Kanmani Anbodu Kadhalan (Rendition)	Gunaa	Ilaiyaraaja
2019	Karutha Penne (Rendition)	Thenmavin Kombath	Berny-Ignatius
2019	Yeh Sama (Rendition)	Jab Jab Phool Khile	Anandji & Kalyanji
2019	Ore Naal	Ilamai Oonjal Aadukirathu	Ilaiyaraaja
2019	Ajeeb Dastan Hai Yeh (Rendition)	Dil Apna Aur Preet Parai	Shankar Jaikishar
2020	Kannadi Koodum Kootti (Rendition)	Pranayavarnangal	Vidyasagar
2020	Karimizhi Kuruviye (Rendition)	Meesa Madhavan	Vidyasagar
2020	Choolamadichu (Rendition)	Summer in Bethlehem	Vidyasagar
2020	Vennila Chandana Kinnam (Rendition)	Azhakiya Ravanan	Vidysagar
2020	Humein Tumse Pyaar Kitna (Rendition)	Kudrat	R.D.Burman
2023	Marudaani (Rendition)	Sakkarakatti	A R Rahman

=== Collaborations ===
YEAR	SONG (s)	ALBUM	COMPOSER (s)	CO SINGERS
2014	All Women's National Anthem by WIFT	-		Alka Yagnik, Anusha mani, Shruti Pathak, Shweta Pandit
2014	Duaa(Acoustic)	Sanam Rendition	Vishal - Shekhar	Sanam Puri
2014	Kora Kagaz Tha Ye Man Mera	Sanam Rendition	S.D Burman	Sanam Puri
2014	Kitna Pyaara Vaada Hai	On TV show Sound Trek on Fox Life	R D Burman	Achint Thakkar
2015	Piya Basanti	-	Ustad Sultan Khan, Achint Thakkar, Sandesh Shandilya	Hriday Gattani
2015	Saawan Ka Mahina	-	Laxmikant Pyarelal	Keerthi Sagathia & Karsan Sagathia
2016	Ishq Abhi Bhi	Jammin	Clinton Cerejo	Clinton Cerejo
2016	Hasi	Hamaari Adhoori Kahani	Ami Mishra	Arjun Kanungo
2016	Yaara	Jammin	A R Rahman	Sanam Band, Shraddha Sharma, Siddharth Slathia, Jonita Gandhi, Arjun Kanungo, Maati Baani and Raaga Trippin
2017	Tu Hai	MTV Unplugged Season 6 Episode 1	A R Rahman	A R Rahman
2020	Sunn	Chemicals	Dino James	Dino James
2024	Tere Naal	Safar	Asfar Hussain, Sanah Moidutty and Vaibhav Pani	Asfar Hussain
