= Bakshi Banu Begum =

- Shahzadi of Mughal Empire
- Born: September 1540; Delhi
- Died: 1596 (aged 55–56)
- Spouse: Ibrahim Mirza (m. 1550; d. 1560); Mirza Sharif-ud-din Hussain (m. 1560; d. 1581)
- House: Timurid
- Father: Humayun
- Mother: Gunwar Bibi
- Religion: Sunni Islam

Bakshi Banu Begum (Persian: بخشی بانو بیگم; born September 1540—died 1596) was a Mughal princess and was the second daughter of Emperor Humayun and his consort Gunwar Bibi. Bakshi Banu was thus the older half-sister of the Mughal Emperor Akbar.

== Early life ==
Bakshi Banu Begum was born in September 1540 in Delhi. Her mother was Bibi Gunwar. Gulbadan Begum noted in 'Humayunama' that during Gunwar's pregnancy everyone said, 'a son will be born'.

In 1543, she was part of the large group of Humayun loyalists who fell into the hands of Askari Mirza, Humayun's half-brother; her infant half-brother Akbar (born in 1542) was also part of the party. In the depth of the winter of 1545, she was sent with Akbar from Qandahar to Kabul by the orders of her uncle, Askari Mirza; the two children were escorted by their attendants and foster mothers.

== Betrothal to Ibrahim Mirza ==
In 1550, at the age of ten, Bakshi Banu was betrothed by her father to Ibrahim Mirza, eldest son of Sulaiman Shah Mirza, Governor of Badakhshan, and his wife Haram Begum, the daughter of Sultan Wais Kulabi Qibchaq Mughal. The family of Sulaiman Mirza, though their paternal ancestress Shah Begum, claimed descent from Alexander the Great. Ibrahim Mirza, who was six years older than Bakshi Banu, was killed in 1560 at 26. She was twenty years of age.

== Marriage to Sharif-ud-din Husain ==
In the same year as the death of Ibrahim Mirza, she was given in marriage by Akbar to Mirza Sharif-ud-din Hussain Ahrari, the Viceroy of Mewat upon his victory over Amer. His father was Khawaja Moin Ala-ud-din, one of the leaders of Khawal. His mother was Kichak Begum, the daughter of Mir Ala-ul-Mulk Termizi and Fakhr Jahan Begum, the daughter of Sultan Abu Sa'id Mirza. After his marriage to Bakshi Banu, Akbar appointed him the Viceroy of Amer.

== Popular Culture ==
- Abir Abrar portrayed her in 2008 film Jodhaa Akbar.
- Sonakshi More portrayed her in 2013 Television serial Jodha Akbar.
