= Do and Die =

1999 book by Manini Chatterjee

- Front cover of the 2010 edition
- Author: Manini Chatterjee
- Language: English
- Genre: Historical
- Publisher: Penguin Books
- Publication date: 1999
- Publication place: India
- Media type: Print (Paperback)
- Pages: 356
- ISBN: 978-0-330-53629-5

Do and Die : The Chittagong Uprising 1930–34 is a 1999 historical non-fiction book written by the Indian author Manini Chatterjee. The book tells the real-life story of revolutionary leader Surya Sen and his role in the Chittagong armoury raid.

The book was awarded the Rabindra Purashkar Award in 2000. It was adapted into the 2010 film Khelein Hum Jee Jaan Sey, directed by Ashutosh Gowariker and starring Abhishek Bachchan and Deepika Padukone.
