= Sunita Gowariker =

Indian model

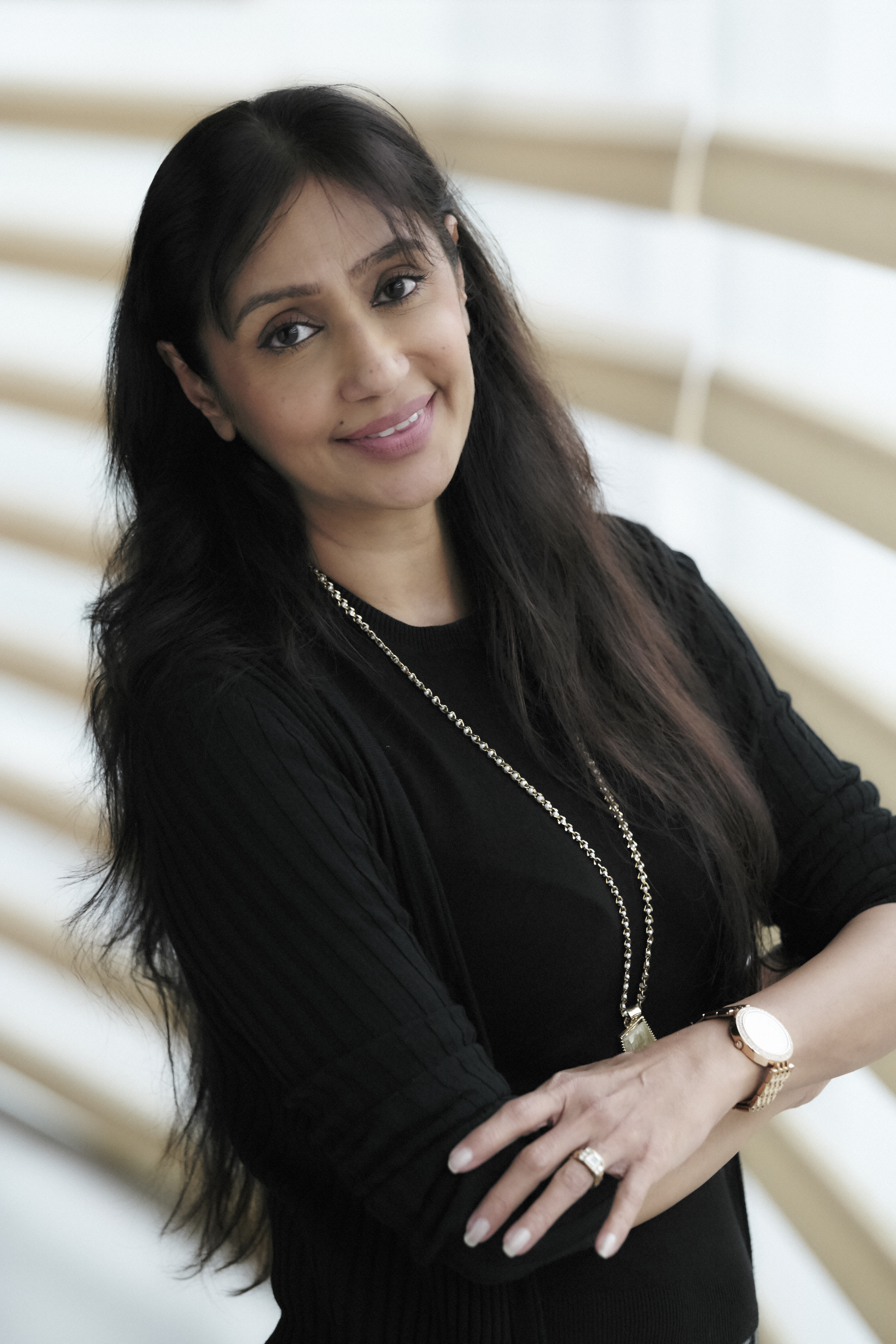
- Sunita Gowariker at the Ashutosh Gowariker Productions office in Mumbai
- Born: Sunita Mukherjee
- Other names: Sunita A. Gowariker
- Occupation: Film Producer
- Years active: 2002-present
- Spouse: Ashutosh Gowariker
- Children: 2
- Father: Deb Mukherjee

Sunita Gowariker (née Mukherjee) is a film producer in the Indian Film Industry (Bollywood).

== Biography ==
Sunita Gowariker was born in India. Her father Deb Mukherjee and mother Manisha both were actors. Her younger brother, director Ayan Mukerji is from Deb's second marriage to a lady named Amrit.

Sunita graduated from Mithibai College with a Bachelor's degree in psychology with honours. After Gowariker worked briefly as a model for brands like Suhana cooking oil, Nycil prickly heat powder, Promise toothpaste and Frootie, she did a short stint with Air India as an air hostess before deciding to devote her entire time to her family.

== Personal life ==
She is married to Indian film director Ashutosh Gowarikar. The couple has two sons named Konark Gowariker and Vishwang Gowariker. She is also the sister of Indian film director Ayan Mukerji.

== Filmography ==
=== Producer ===
- Mohenjo Daro (2016)
- Khelein Hum Jee Jaan Sey (2010)
- What's Your Raashee? (2009)
- Jodhaa Akbar (2008)
- Swades (2004, executive producer - as Sunita A. Gowariker)
