= Khelein Hum Jee Jaan Sey =

2010 film by Ashutosh Gowariker

- Theatrical release poster
- Directed by: Ashutosh Gowarikar
- Screenplay by: Ashutosh Gowariker; Raoul V Randolf; Dialogues: Vijay Maurya
- Based on: Do And Die: The Chittagong Uprising 1930-34 by Manini Chatterjee
- Produced by: Ajay Bijli; Sanjeev Bijli; Sunita A. Gowariker
- Starring: Abhishek Bachchan; Deepika Padukone; Sikandar Kher; Vishakha Singh
- Cinematography: Kiran Deohans; Seetha Sandhiri
- Edited by: Dilip Deo
- Music by: Sohail Sen
- Production company: Ashutosh Gowarikar Productions
- Distributed by: PVR Pictures
- Release date: 3 December 2010
- Running time: 174 minutes
- Country: India
- Language: Hindi
- Budget: ₹450 million (US$4.7 million)
- Box office: ₹49.1 million (US$510,000)

Khelein Hum Jee Jaan Sey (transl. We Play with Passion) is an Indian Hindi-language historical action-adventure film directed by Ashutosh Gowariker and released on 3 December 2010. Starring Abhishek Bachchan, Deepika Padukone and Sikandar Kher, it was based on Manini Chatterjee's Do and Die, an account of the 1930 Chittagong armoury raid.

Although the film was set in Chittagong (in present-day Bangladesh), it was primarily shot in Goa; portions were filmed in Mumbai. Its first promo was posted on 12 October 2010 on the film's Facebook page. The film depicts the Chittagong Uprising from its beginning to its aftermath, an 18 April 1930 attempt to raid the armoury of police and auxiliary forces in Chittagong (then part of the British Raj's Bengal Presidency) by armed Indian independence fighters led by Surya Sen.

== Plot ==
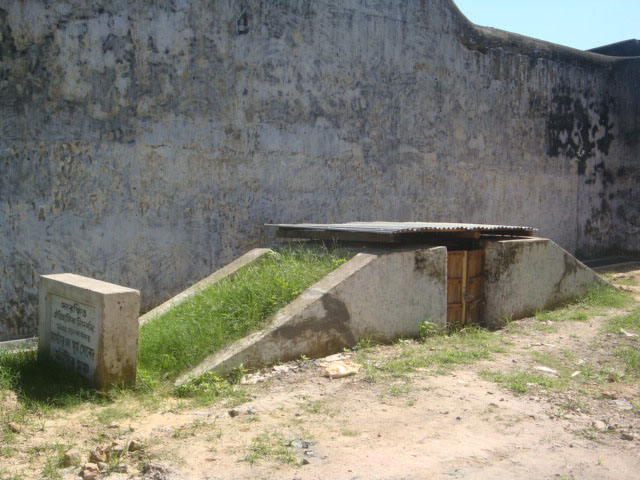
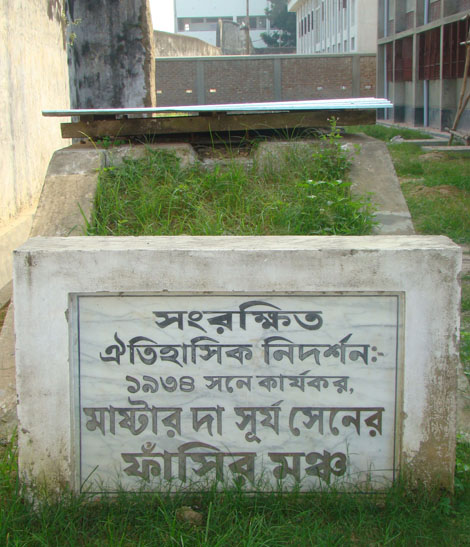
The gallows at Chittagong Central Jail, where Surya Sen was hanged; the government of Bangladesh has designated it a monument.

Sixteen young people are playing football in an open field when an army convoy arrives, ordering them to leave the field because they are setting up a base. When the young people object, the soldiers threaten them and then leave in anticipation of a meeting with (Surya Sen).

Surya Sen is a village schoolteacher and an activist for Indian independence. He has connections with other revolutionaries, who see him as their leader: Ganesh Ghosh (Samrat Mukerji), Lokenath Bal, Ambika Chakraborty, Nirmal Sen (Sikander Kher) and Ananta Singh (Maninder Singh). After his release from prison, Nirmal Sen (Sikandar Kher) meets Surya Sen and asks him what to do next. Surya Sen tells him and Nirmal meets Pritilata Waddedar (Vishakha Singh), who expresses the eagerness of her and her friend Kalpana Datta (Deepika Padukone) to join the Indian Republican Army. Pritilata and Kalpana meet Surya Sen, who has demonstrated their skills by asking them to collect information. Disguised as cleaners, they draw sketches of the cantonment.

Surya Sen divides the group into four, and asks them to separate. While he is staying with his sister in Patiya, police commanded by Major Cameron surround him; the major is shot dead by Nirmal Sen. The wounded Nirmal Sen tells Surya Sen to escape, sacrificing his own life.

Eight young rebels, led by Pritilata, later attack the European Club. After killing the officials there, the rebels flee and Pritilata commits suicide by ingesting cyanide. Surya Sen escapes and retreats to another house with Kalpana and the other rebels. The Chittagong superintendent of police (SP) cracks down on the rebels and begins a manhunt for Surya Sen. Although he escapes, other members are arrested, killed, or shoot themselves to death to avoid police torture.

Several months later, during an army football match, the young rebel Haripada assassinates the SP who led the crackdown. Surya Sen is arrested, tried, and sentenced to death by hanging; Surya Sen happily accepts the verdict. Before the sentence is carried out, however, his British executioners break his teeth, limbs, and joints with a hammer. Unconscious, he is dragged to the scaffold and hanged.

== Cast ==
- Abhishek Bachchan as Surya Sen
- Deepika Padukone as Kalpana Dutta
- Sikander Kher as Nirmal Sen
- Vishakha Singh as Pritilata Waddedar
- Maninder Singh as Ananta Singh
- Vikramjeet Virk as Assanullah Khan
- Samrat Mukherjee as Ganesh Ghosh
- Palash Mucchal as Subodh Roy ( Jhunku)

== Production ==
Asin was the first choice for Deepika's role in the film but due to several commitments Asin opted out.

== Critical reception ==
Khelein Hum Jee Jaan Sey opened to generally-positive reviews. Critics appreciated the film, although some said that (at almost three hours) it was excessively long. According to Nikhat Kazmi of The Times of India, the filmmaker was able to "combine high-octane drama with a high degree of restraint ... The film unfolds like a relentless thriller with loads of action involving the band of revolutionaries as they go about their bloody business."

An NDTV reviewer rated the film 2.5 out of 5: "Ashutosh Gowariker is Bollywood's most earnest historian and Khelein Hum Jee Jaan Sey is a noble attempt at restoring glory to long-forgotten heroes". Taran Adarsh of Bollywood Hungama rated the film four out of five, calling the bygone era's recreation "demanding, laborious and strenuous. It's a challenge to present the era convincingly. Besides extensive detailing to lend authenticity, the director carries the responsibility of making the characters come alive to the present-day generation. Gowariker has successfully done that in the past and does it successfully yet again in Khelein Hum Jee Jaan Sey. The expectations from Khelein Hum Jee Jaan Sey are minimal, but you can't overlook the fact that it's a genuinely honest effort that needs to be encouraged and appreciated."

Sify, which also gave it a two-and-a half-rating, recommended the film. Rajeev Masand of CNN IBN gave it two stars: "It's a noble effort that gives you a glimpse of forgotten history".

A Reuters reviewer wrote, "Gowariker's biggest strength is that he chooses a story worth telling. For that reason alone, and to get a glimpse into a much-ignored part of our history, this film is worth a watch." For the newspaper Daily News and Analysis, Aniruddha Guha wrote that the film's plot made it watchable: "The strong points of the film are the novel storyline – that of kids fighting for independence – and the performances of most actors, especially the children. Also, Gowariker manages to recreate the era well (with art director Nitin Chandrakant Desai), and draws you in the plot slowly and steadily". Students Of Guru Harkrishan Public School, Vasant Vihar, Went to watch this film in PVR Priya.Actually it was a school picnic.

== Soundtrack ==
The film's songs and score were composed by Sohail Sen, who had worked on Ashutosh's previous film What's Your Raashee?. The lyrics were written by Javed Akhtar. The music was launched on 27 October 2010. Its track listing was posted on the film's Facebook page the day it was released. Malayalam playback singer Ranjini Jose made her Bollywood debut on "Naiyn Tere".

== Nominations ==
- 2011 Zee Cine Awards
  - Best Story: Ashutosh Gowariker
- 2011 Stardust Awards
  - Breakthrough Performance - Female: Vishakha Singh
  - Breakthrough Performance - Male: Sikander Kher
  - Standout Performance by a Music Director: Sohail Sen
  - New Musical Sensation - Male: Sohail Sen ("Yeh Des Hai Mera")
