= Tu Hai =

2016 song by A. R. Rahman and Sanah Moidutty

- Tu Hai song cover featuring actors Hrithik Roshan and Pooja Hegde

Single by A. R. Rahman and Sanah Moidutty

from the album Mohenjo Daro
- Language: Hindi
- Released: 9 July 2016
- Recorded: 2016
- Studio: YRF, Mumbai; Future Sound of Bombay; Prasad Labs, Hyderabad
- Genre: Filmi; Indian pop; soft-rock
- Length: 3:59
- Label: T-Series
- Composer: A. R. Rahman
- Lyricist: Javed Akhtar
- Producer: A. R. Rahman

Music video
- "Tu Hai" on YouTube

"Tu Hai" (transl. You are) is an Indian Hindi-language song from the soundtrack album of the 2016 Hindi film Mohenjo Daro. The song is sung by A. R. Rahman and Sanah Moidutty. The music of the song was composed by A. R. Rahman while the lyrics were penned by Javed Akhtar. The music video of the track features Hrithik Roshan and Pooja Hegde. The song's lyrical version was released on 10 August 2016, while the video song was released on 6 July 2016 under the music label T-Series.

The song received positive reviews from film critics, the majority of whom complimented its composition. The song was reprised in MTV Unplugged Season 6 and was also rendered by A. R. Rahman.

== Music video ==
The music video features Hrithik Roshan and Pooja Hegde dancing around the Great Bath. The Bollywood dance inspiration during the time of the Indus Valley Civilisation was termed inaccurate, and the Great Bath was termed as looking like a chlorinated swimming pool.

== Release ==
The music video was released on 6 July 2016, by T-Series. The lyrical was released on 10 August 2016 and the audio of the song was released on 9 July 2016. The song was made available at iTunes the same day of release and for online streaming at JioSaavn and Gaana on 6 July 2016.

== Reception ==
=== Critical reviews ===
The Times of India stated that "Tu Hai is a classic Rahman number; it is soft, melodious, touches your heart with a simple tune and has the breeziness of a romantic track. Sanah scores in this minimalistic number, which lets the lyrics take center stage. Filmfare wrote that "Tu hai is a meatier, soulful song that grips you from the word go."

The Hindu wrote that "But for the fact that Hrithik Roshan, with a unicorn-style single horn in his turban, doesn't sound anything like A.R. Rahman (who is singing this song), this is a lovely song. It has that typically Rahman flow that starts with an unusual opening, and goes on to be even more free-flowing". On the contrary, a critic from Firstpost wrote, "Soulful song, soulless choreography, laughable overall".
