= Mohenjo Daro (film) =

2016 Indian film by Ashutosh Gowariker

- Theatrical release poster
- Directed by: Ashutosh Gowariker
- Written by: Ashutosh Gowariker
- Dialogues by: Preeti Mamgain
- Based on: Mohan Jo Daro (a Sindhi novel) by Ali Baba
- Produced by: Siddharth Roy Kapur; Sunita Gowariker
- Starring: Hrithik Roshan; Pooja Hegde; Kabir Bedi; Manish Choudhary; Arunoday Singh
- Cinematography: C. K. Muraleedharan
- Visual effects by: Govardhan Vigraham
- Edited by: Sandeep Francis
- Music by: A. R. Rahman
- Production companies: Ashutosh Gowariker Productions Pvt. Ltd. UTV Motion Pictures
- Distributed by: UTV Motion Pictures
- Release date: 12 August 2016
- Running time: 169 minutes
- Country: India
- Language: Hindi
- Budget: ₹100 crore
- Box office: ₹107.8 crore

Mohenjo Daro is a 2016 Indian Hindi-language period action-adventure film written and directed by Ashutosh Gowariker. It was produced by Siddharth Roy Kapur for UTV Motion Pictures and The Walt Disney Company India and Sunita Gowariker for Ashutosh Gowariker Productions (AGPPL), and stars Hrithik Roshan and Pooja Hegde. Set in the ancient Indus Valley civilisation city of Mohenjo-daro, a UNESCO World Heritage Site, it is loosely based on Ali Baba's Sindhi novel "Mohan Jo Daro". This film marked Pooja Hegde's debut in Hindi cinema.

Set in 2016 BCE at the height of the Indus Valley civilisation, the story follows a farmer Sarman (Hrithik Roshan), who travels to the city of Mohenjo-daro and falls in love with a high-status woman (Pooja Hegde), and who must then challenge the city's elite, and fight against overwhelming odds to save their civilisation.

Gowariker took over three years to research and develop the script, working closely with archaeologists to ensure authenticity in the representation of his fictional story. The film was shot in Bhuj and Mumbai, with brief schedules in Bhedaghat (Jabalpur) and Thane. The score and soundtrack are composed by A. R. Rahman with lyrics penned by Javed Akhtar. The film was released worldwide on 12 August 2016. The film received mixed reviews and grossed ₹107.8 crore (US$11 million) worldwide, underperforming at the box office.

Mohenjo Daro marks the last film production of UTV Motion Pictures, as two Disney releases, Dangal and Jagga Jasoos, became producer Kapur's final projects under the Disney·UTV brand before his contract with the company lapsed on 1 January 2017; the non-Hindi versions of both films were nonetheless presented by the banner, while Jagga Jasoos faced delays before its release in mid-July 2017.

== Plot ==
Sarman (Hrithik Roshan), a young man from the village of Amri, lost his parents at a young age. Sarman kills a crocodile that has been terrorizing his village's fishermen and is hailed as a hero. He asks his uncle, Durjan (Nitish Bharadwaj), to allow him to go to Mohenjo Daro to trade their family's goods, but his uncle refuses. Sarman attempts to sneak away to the city at night with his friend Hojo (Umang Vyas) but is caught by Durjan, who relents and allows both friends to go. He gives Sarman a seal that contains an inscription of a unicorn that Sarman often sees in his dreams, suggesting he uses it only once in a life-or-death situation.

Arriving in Mohenjo Daro, Sarman learns that the city is ruled by the tyrannical Senate Chief Maham (Kabir Bedi) and his wicked son Moonja (Arunoday Singh). He also learns that the unicorn he sees in his dreams is the symbol of the city, and feels the city is oddly familiar to him. While Sarman is trading, Maham proposes to impose an additional tax on the farmers so that the city may grow, but Sarman leads the farmers to oppose the taxes so that their families don't starve to death. Sarman gains access to the upper city by showing his uncle's amulet and meets Chaani (Pooja Hegde), the daughter of the head priest (Manish Choudhary) of Mohenjo Daro. Sarman is enchanted by Chaani's beauty and charm and falls in love with her. Upon meeting, the head priest seems to recognise Sarman. Chaani reveals to Sarman that she has been forcibly betrothed to Moonja. Maham discovers that Sarman and Chaani love each other and that Sarman is the leader of the tax revolt, so he challenges Sarman to fight Bakar and Zokar, his two champions. Sarman proposes that if he wins, Chaani will be released from her engagement, and Maham accepts the terms.

On the night before Sarman's clash with Bakar and Zokar, the head priest reveals to him how Maham was expelled from Harappa for illegal trade with the Sumerians. Maham entered Mohenjo Daro as a trader and quickly rose to become the trade chief. Maham had discovered that the mighty Sindhu River held vast gold deposits, so he decided to place a dam on the river and divert its course to mine the gold. The wise Senate Chief Srujan (Sharad Kelkar), who is revealed to be Sarman's father, opposed this, but Maham won the vote to build the dam. He had Srujan framed and arrested for hoarding gold. Chaani's father and Durjan – Sarman's uncle – were coerced by Maham to betray Srujan, and the former was killed later by Moonja – Maham's son. Maham then took Srujan's place as the new Senate Chief.

In the arena outside the city, Sarman faces the ferocious Tajik mountain cannibals Bakar and Zokhar. After a vicious battle, he kills one of the cannibals but spares the other, and the people of Mohenjo Daro rally even more behind him. Enraged, Maham urges Moonja to finish off Chaani and the priest. Moonja kills the priest, but Sarman saves Chaani and kills Moonja. Sarman exposes Maham's plan to use the gold from the Sindhu to enrich himself and to smuggle in weapons from the Sumerians. All the chiefs now stand against Maham. The people elect Sarman as the new chief, but Sarman suggests Mohenjo Daro needs a people's government, not a chief. With the arrival of a heavy thunderstorm, Sarman realises that the dam will burst and the Sindhu river will flood the city. He rallies the people to form a floating bridge by tying boats together.

They evacuate Mohenjo Daro and cross to the other side of the river. The dam collapses, and Maham, chained in the city square, drowns as the city is destroyed. The survivors migrate to another river, where Sarman sees the unicorn of his dreams and names the river Ganga.

== Cast ==
- Hrithik Roshan as Sarman, Chaani's love interest
- Pooja Hegde as Chaani, the Priest's daughter and Sarman's love interest
- Kabir Bedi as Maham, the Senate chief
- Arunoday Singh as Moonja, Maham's son
- Suhasini Mulay as Laashi, Maham's wife
- Nitish Bharadwaj as Durjan, Sarman's uncle
- Kishori Shahane as Bima, Sarman's aunt
- Manish Choudhary as The Priest, Chaani's father
- Narendra Jha as Jakhiro, the mad man and a former member of Srujan's council
- Shaji Chaudhary as Kulka
- Tufail Khan Rigoo as Ishme Dagan, the Sumerian
- Diganta Hazarika as Lothar, The Guard
- Naina Trivedi as Junu, Chaani's friend
- Shyraa Roy as Mohini
- Umang Vyas as Hojo, Sarman's friend
- Casey Frank as Bakar
- Mike Homik as Zokar

Cameo appearances

- Sharad Kelkar as Srujan, Sarman's late father
- Jividha Sharma as Rami, Sarman's late mother

== Production ==
=== Development ===
Director Ashutosh Gowariker was first inspired to make a film set in the ancient Indus Valley civilization when he was in Bhuj, Gujarat, scouting locations for his then-upcoming Lagaan (2001), and stumbled across the massive excavations in progress at the ruins of Dholavira: "I thought, My God! This is incredible! What happened to this civilisation, who were the people, how did they live?"

Several other film projects later, Gowariker announced the film Mohenjo Daro officially in February 2014 with A. R. Rahman composing the film score.

On taking up the project, in an interview, Gowariker stated that there was meagre and superficial information available about the people in that civilisation, particularly about their lifestyle, food, and feelings. The lack of information about the period troubled Gowariker, and he decided that whenever he would get a story to tell, it will be depicted circa 2500 BC at Mohenjo-daro which, despite being the largest city yet discovered from that ancient civilisation, is today known only by the name—which translates as "Mound of the Dead" in English—ascribed by the Sindhi locals to the site when its ruins were discovered in 1922. "Mohenjo Daro" is not only the official name associated with that ancient city by the United Nations (as a World Heritage Site since 1980), but also the only name associated with it by archaeologists and historians around the world, as well as the general public. Thus, regardless of the literal translation of the words, "Mohenjo Daro" was the chosen title for an audience to identify with the actual reference point despite the fact that the city would likely not been so named in ancient times.

On the film's plot, he was quoted as saying, "While the plot will follow Mohenjo-daro and the culture and the vibe of the ancient civilisation, it will largely centre on a love story." It took Gowariker three years to piece together a plot of the entire civilisation through various cities and weave a love story into it.

There were challenges in adapting for cinema a story based on a renowned ancient civilisation which had a written language not yet deciphered. Because modern science can not yet read anything the Indus Valley peoples wrote about themselves, any aspect about their civilisation has to be conjectured from what relics survive, by archaeologists working at their various ruins. As The Indian Express pointed out, "whatever we do know about Mohenjo-daro is perhaps as much an imagination of the historian as that of a filmmaker who depicts it in visual terms."

During Ashutosh Gowariker's research, he met "as many as seven archaeologists" who are closely involved in excavating sites and studying the Indus Valley civilisation. After much reading of published archaeological reports on his own, he brought in the American archaeologist Jonathan Mark Kenoyer of the University of Wisconsin–Madison, considered one of the world's leading experts on the subject, who had worked at the ruins of Mohenjo-Daro over 35 years. He brought together Kenoyer to a round-table discussion with five other expert archaeologists who have also been working on this topic for many years—P. Ajit Prasad, V. N. Prabakhar, K. Krishnan, Vasant Shinde, and R. S. Bisht, "who are all from the Archaeological Survey of India, Maharaja Sayajirao University of Baroda and other institutions, all with expertise in different aspects of the same civilisation." Gowariker had also personally revisited the archaeological dig at Dholavira in Gujarat.

Kenoyer later visited Bhuj to inspect and approve the sets and props built by the filmmakers.

The symbol ultimately selected for the film Mohenjo Daro recalls one of the earliest discovered artifacts from the initial archaeological excavations at the ruins of the ancient city itself: 'Another [seal] shows six animal heads—"unicorn", bison, antelope, tiger, the remaining two broken—radiating from a ring, and recalling a whorl on another seal from the same site with a single "unicorn" and five featureless lobes', the "unicorn" being one of the 'most frequently represented' animals portrayed among the 'over 1,200 of them [seals] [which] have been found at Mohenjo-daro alone'. The filmmaker has chosen to identify the "unicorn" with his central character.

The broadest artistic license required in bringing the Indus Valley civilisation to the cinema, inevitably, would be costuming. Because although "undisputed traces of cotton cloth have survived at Mohenjo-Daro" and the Indus culture is believed by archaeologists to have pioneered the cultivation of cotton for clothmaking in the ancient world, no actual samples of finished clothing or other organic matter have survived over these four thousand years, due to the "damp alkaline soil" prevailing at the Indus sites. Thus, the only reference material is the relative handful (compared with the broad abundance of seals found, or commercial items such as weights and measures) of terracotta humanoid figurines or small stone statues found at various excavations, which are mostly only partially intact and of mostly unknown purpose—but male or female, are mostly naked. Some of the female figures, for instance, wear elaborate headdresses and jewellery but little else. Explained the director in an interview, "I cannot make a movie with so much nudity, obviously. So I had to create and imagine a costume which will be away from all the different styles that we have seen in other movies, and yet be special for this civilisation."

With the film being set in a certain period, the whole site had to be recreated in a film studio. He was involved in working out the logistics during June 2014. The film's stunts were choreographed by Glenn Boswell and the costumes were designed by April Ferry and Neeta Lulla. U.K. based trainer Joshua Kyle Baker was roped in to train Roshan for his character in the film. He described the three-month training so as to allow Roshan to appear 'lithe' and 'agile' rather than muscular. Relating the natural environment required for Mohenjo Daro, Gowariker was impressed with the calamitous VFX seen in the films The Day After Tomorrow and 10,000 BC that were designed by Karen Goulekas. In September 2014, as a visual effects supervisor, Goulekas was brought on board for the film. Gowariker revisited Bhuj in December 2014 to begin production.

=== Casting ===
In August 2014, Roshan, who had starred in Gowariker's critically and commercially successful Jodhaa Akbar in 2008, was confirmed to play the male lead role again for Mohenjo Daro. He reportedly demanded ₹50 crore (US$5.2 million). Said the director, "I wouldn't have made the film, without Hrithik." "[T]his is a different world, and I thought only Hrithik would blend in perfectly."

Telugu and Tamil cinema actress Pooja Hegde was signed as the female lead, and made her Hindi film debut with Mohenjo Daro. "While scripting the film, I was thinking that I needed someone with innocence and someone who did not have stardom baggage [to be received by the audience only as this character]. I thus began looking for a fresh face when Sunita (Gowariker) spotted Pooja in a commercial and suggested that we call her. She called Pooja and I auditioned her. And that was it!"

Veteran actor Kabir Bedi was signed as the primary villain, backed by Arunoday Singh as the younger villain.

For supporting roles, casting director Nalini Rathnam wanted to bring in newer and fresh faces, even from non-Hindi speaking regions. As the director explained this process, "All kinds of actors, including seasoned actors, never get a chance to come to Mumbai or they don't want to as they are happy in their own space. So there is a different kind of freshness there to get them on board. I did this in Lagaan and Jodhaa Akbar. In this film too, I wanted to get some fresh actors, so I have Diganta Hazarika, who is a well-known Assamese actor. It is a time-consuming process but the payoff big."

Since action and romance were key to his story, perfectionist Gowariker went to great lengths in casting to ensure his vision reaches the screen. For example, for one specific action sequence, the director auditioned nearly 300 candidates before finally casting the two giant barbarian fighters who are more than 7 feet tall, in order to make the sequence thrilling and visually appealing when presented to the audience opposite his 6-foot-tall hero.

To populate his recreation of the ancient city, Gowariker required a large number of non-actors as extras. With the cooperation of the Bhuj panchayat (community council), the filmmakers hosted auditions for local residents. Many of those seen on-screen in cityscapes and group scenes throughout Mohenjo Daro are the real-life local citizens of Bhuj.

=== Pre-production ===
Construction of the primary outdoor sets to be used in recreating the ancient city duly commenced in Bhuj, Gujarat, near where Gowariker had shot his earlier film, Lagaan (2001).

As AGPPL producer Sunita Gowariker recounted their initial dialogue when Ashutosh decided Mohenjo Daro as his next project, her immediate response was that the city does not exist any more, how would they shoot the film. To which Ashutosh responded: "We put up the whole city!" The film sets ultimately built to recreate the ancient city of Mohenjo-daro spanned more than 25 acres.

Painstaking effort was made to ensure accuracy of the city's film set construction, matching its proportions and architecture to the actual archaeological ruins. The famous Great Bath, for instance, is built to scale, as are the houses in the film. To quote lead actress Pooja Hegde, "The sets were so detailed that once we stepped onto them, you were enveloped by the ambience. Ashu sir's detailing is so great that if there's a mashal, the wall behind it would be blackened to resemble soot. Whenever I stepped onto the sets, I automatically got into the mood ... Ashu sir made you feel like you were already there."

However, construction was delayed in mid-September 2014, when workers belonging to Allied Mazdoor Union and Film Studio Setting refused to complete the pre-production work, alleging non-payment of their regular expenses and remuneration. In response to this stalled situation, Gowariker took a legal route and lodged a complaint with the Indian Film and Television Producers' Council accusing the members of stalling work that would result in losses to the company. Lawrence D'Souza, the executive producer of the film, maintained that though their payments were ready, the remote filming locations of Bhuj delayed the reception of the same.

Ayananka Bose had originally been signed as the cinematographer. When the film was delayed, he took up other projects as he was paid on a project-to-project basis. Bose failed to join the discussions prior to filming and requested Gowariker to be allowed to join the set directly after he was done with his other commitments. A displeased Gowariker replaced Bose with C. K. Muraleedharan.

The initial outdoor schedule of principal photography had been projected to begin in November 2014. However, further delay occurred when lead actor Hrithik Roshan injured his shoulder during training in late October 2014. Because Mohenjo Daro was a physically demanding film with challenging action sequences that were to be shot starting with the very first schedule, and no body doubles were to be used, Gowariker postponed the shoot for six weeks, until January 2015. Confirming this delay, Sunita Gowariker stated, "Ashutosh and I want Hrithik to recuperate fully before beginning the film, since we plan to start with action sequences. Now we will start shooting in the first week of January. It is important to us that Hrithik is 100% fit, and shifting the shooting dates by a few weeks makes a lot of sense."

=== Filming ===
Principal photography commenced in Bhuj on 27 January 2015. But the demanding action sequences needed by the film took a hard physical toll on the cast which resulted in delays due to injury, especially when an accident involved the lead actor, Hrithik Roshan, who was required for the maximum number of scenes. For instance, shooting was delayed for several days in March 2015, when Hrithik sprained his neck during a fight sequence. The first schedule of 101 days nonetheless wrapped up in Bhuj by 23 May 2015. In June 2015, Hrithik started training to fight with tigers in one of the sequences of the film. A second, shorter outdoor schedule resumed in Bhuj in late summer and was completed by October 2015.

Another outdoor schedule of filming began in Jabalpur on 2 November 2015, where a fight sequence with crocodiles was completed on the banks of river Narmada at Bhedaghat.

In December 2015, the next schedule began at Film City in Mumbai, where most interior sets used for the film had been constructed. Unfortunately, however, an on-set accident during an action sequence in January 2016 tore two ligaments and severely sprained the ankle of lead actor Hrithik Roshan, which kept him home on crutches and doctor-ordered bed rest for two whole months before primary photography could resume in late March.

On 4 April 2016, the crew filmed the climax of the film at China Creek in Thane. Principal photography of Mohenjo Daro finally wrapped on 8 April 2016.

=== Post-production ===
Post-production of Mohenjo Daro was supervised by Gowariker in conjunction with editor Sandeep Francis. Sound re-recording was performed at Futureworks by Justin Jose K. according to the sound design by Parikshit Lalwani and Kunal Mehta. Digital intermediate was done by Prime Focus colorist Makarand Surte. Visual effects were completed by the firm Drishyam VFX under the guidance of VFX consultant Karen Goulekas in conjunction with VFX supervisor Govardhan Vigraham.

India's Central Board of Film Certification cleared Mohenjo Daro for release without any cuts, awarding it a "U/A" certificate.

=== Accusations of plagiarism ===
On 3 August 2016, the Bombay High Court rejected allegations by Akashaditya Lama that Gowariker had plagiarised his script, and also "... imposed exemplary and punitive costs of Rs. 150,000 against Lama for putting false allegations and harassing makers of the film. The court has also slammed Lama for giving interviews, media articles and related material put on social media to harass the director and other stars of the film." Gowariker donated the entire fine received (approx. $2,246) to the Naam Foundation, a charity to benefit Maharashtra's drought-hit farmers.

== Music ==
The music for the film was composed by A. R. Rahman, marking his fourth collaboration with Gowariker, after Lagaan, Swades, and Jodhaa Akbar. The lyrics were penned by Javed Akhtar. The music rights were acquired by T-Series.

The soundtrack consists of eight tracks, namely, "Mohenjo Mohenjo", "Sindhu Ma", "Sarsariya", "Tu Hai", "Whispers Of The Mind", "Whispers Of The Heart", "The Shimmer Of Sindhu", and "Lakh Lakh Thora". The album was released by T-Series on 6 July 2016.

== Release ==
Mohenjo Daro was released across 2600–2700 screens in India. Disney India announced in September 2016, that the company would end production of Bollywood films and instead would shift focus on releasing Disney films produced in the United States. Initially, the film announced to release on 14 January 2016, 19 December 2015 and 10 March 2016.

=== Locarno International Film Festival ===
Even before the film's theatrical release, Mohenjo Daro had been honoured as the Closing Film of the 69th Locarno International Film Festival in Switzerland. Thus on 13 August 2016, Mohenjo Daro was screened at the Piazza Grande, immediately before Locarno's award ceremony.

=== Special screenings ===
A special screening of Mohenjo Daro was arranged for the officials of the Ministry of Information and Broadcasting of India in New Delhi on 18 September 2016. The film was also screened at the 45th Annual Conference on South Asia in Madison, Wisconsin on 23 October 2016.

== Reception ==
=== Critical reception ===
Mohenjo Daro received mixed reviews from critics who praised its cast performances, musical numbers, action sequences, VFX and characterisation, but criticised its historical inaccuracies, script and screenplay. On the review aggregator website Rotten Tomatoes, 36% of 14 critics' reviews are positive, with an average rating of 5.3/10. Metacritic, which uses a weighted average, assigned the film a score of 39 out of 100, based on 4 critics, indicating "generally unfavorable" reviews.

Srijana Mitra Das of The Times of India gave the film a rating of 4/5 and wrote "Straight away, if you want to enjoy Mohenjo Daro, leave your disbelief by the door for Ashutosh Gowarikar's newest blast from the past only works as a fairy tale, not nailed in history, but hanging somewhere between Game of Thrones and Baahubali." Mumbai Mirror gave the film rating of 3/5 and termed Mohenjo Daro as good. Bollywood Hungama gave the film rating of 2.5/5 and wrote "Mohenjo Daro comes across as a grand historical fictional tale which appeals only in parts." Rachit Gupta of Filmfare gave the film a rating of 2.5/5 and wrote "Full marks to director Ashutosh Gowariker and the Mohenjo Daro team for making a film that’s detailed and a very good insight into the lost Indus Valley Civilisation. The close attention to detail, especially on the production design is the strength of this movie. If you’ve ever wondered what the ancient cities of Mohenjo-daro and Harappa must’ve looked like, this movie is a must watch."

== Box office ==
Mohenjo Daro clashed with Akshay Kumar's Rustom. Mohenjo Daro grossed ₹1.03 billion (US$11 million) worldwide in its first 10 days. Its final worldwide gross was ₹108 crore (US$11 million), including ₹80.6 crore (US$8.4 million) in India and ₹27.2 crore (US$2.8 million) overseas. In addition to its box office gross, the film also earned ₹60 crore (US$6.2 million) from satellite rights (₹45 crore (US$4.7 million)) and music rights (₹15 crore (US$1.6 million)).

== Accolades ==
Award (Note: Awards, festivals and organizations are in alphabetical order.)	Year	Category	Recipient	Result	Ref.
Stardust Awards	2016	Superstar of Tomorrow – Female	Pooja Hegde	Nominated	
Stardust Awards	2016	Best Actor in a negative role	Kabir Bedi	Nominated	

== See also ==
- Moriro ain Mangermachh
- List of Asian historical drama films
