= Roopangarh Fort =

Building in Rajasthan, India

Coordinates: 26.796582°N 74.85056°E

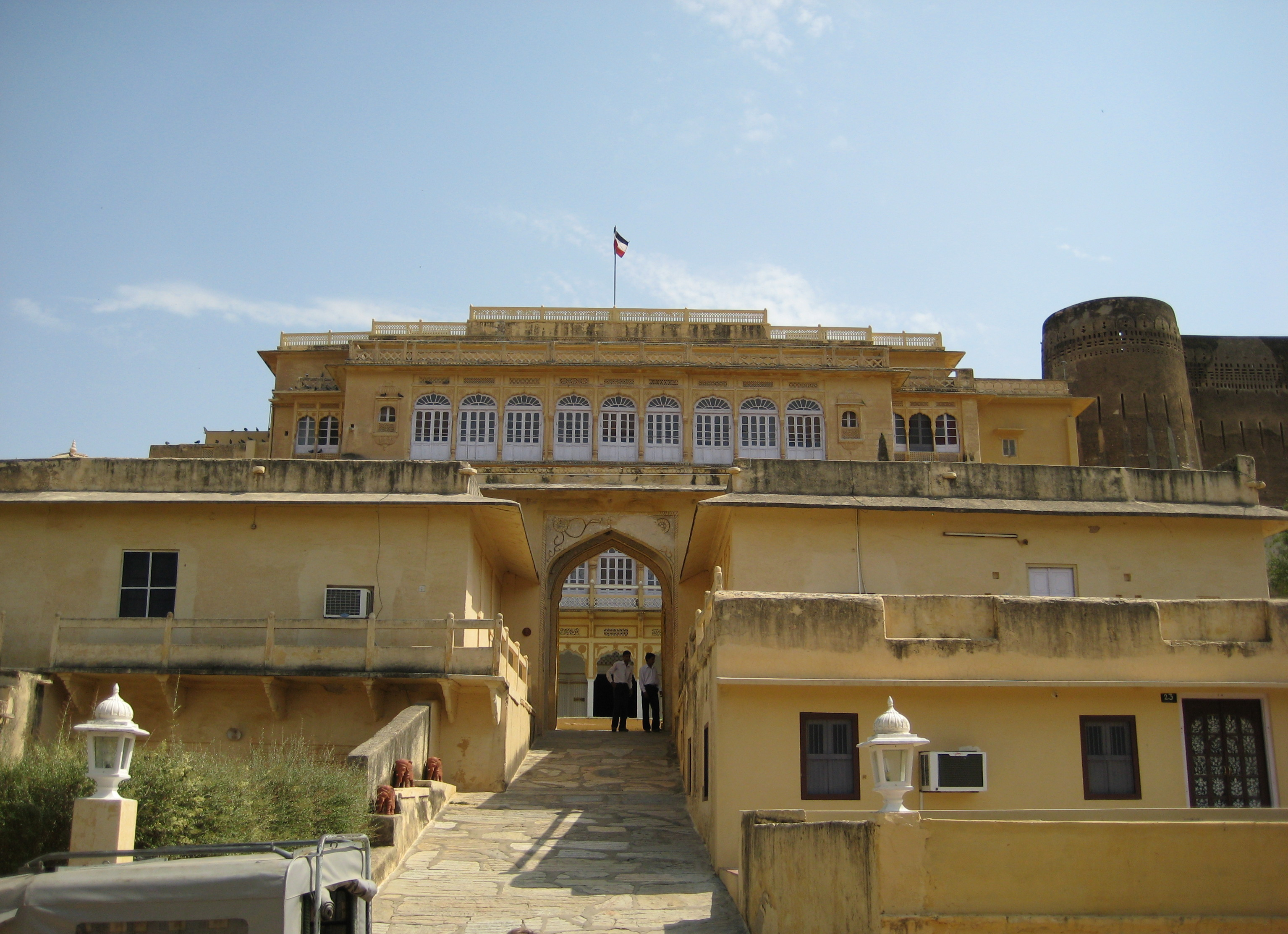
The entrance to the fort

Roopangarh Fort is a former fortress and palace in the town of Roopangarh, Rajasthan, India that is today a hotel. The fortress was originally built by, and named after, Maharaja Roop Singh of Kishangarh in 1648. It is sited at strategic point atop a hill to the north of Kishangarh controlling the important trade route to the Sambhar Salt Lake. Around the fort a substantial town grew up that became a centre for artisans and manufacturers. For a century it also served as the primary residence of the Maharajas of Kishangarh, and the capital of the state. An ornate palace was built next to the fortress.

In 1999 the Maharaja opened the fort as a hotel, but left the interior and exterior little changed from its time as a palace. It has 20 rooms, some of which are vast former royal suites.
