= Ashutosh Gowariker =

Indian filmmaker and actor (born 1964)

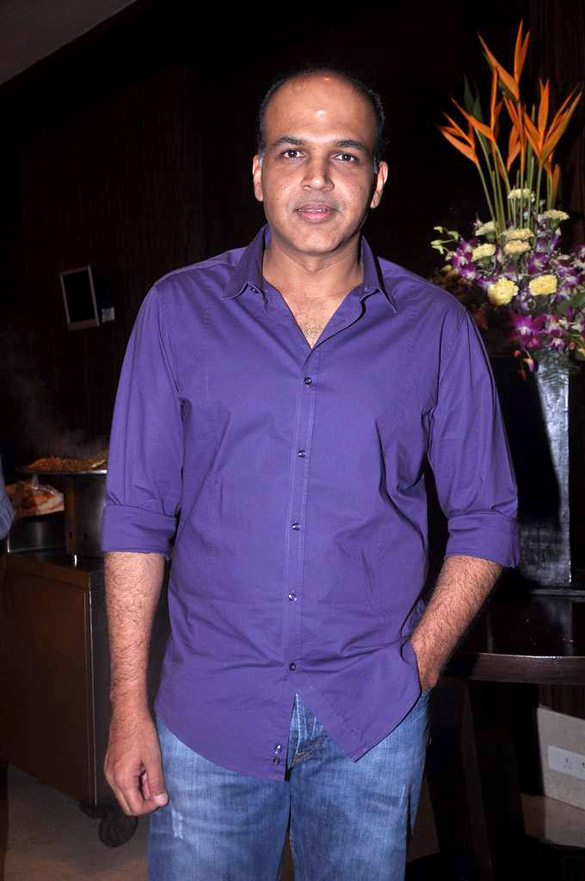
- Gowariker at the launch of T P Aggarwal's trade magazine Blockbuster
- Born: 15 February 1964 (age 62); Kolhapur, Maharashtra, India
- Occupations: Director, producer, screenwriter, actor
- Years active: 1984–present
- Spouse: Sunita Mukherjee (m. 1988)

Ashutosh Gowariker (born 15 February 1964) is an Indian film director, actor, screenwriter and producer who works in Indian Hindi cinema. He is best known for directing period sports drama Lagaan (2001), the social drama Swades (2004) and historical romantic drama Jodhaa Akbar (2008), winning the Filmfare Award for Best Film and Best Director for Lagaan and Jodhaa Akbar. Lagaan was nominated for the Academy Award for Best International Feature Film at the 74th Academy Awards, which makes him a voting member of the Academy Awards. He returned to acting by playing the lead role in the critically acclaimed comedy drama Ventilator (2016).

== Early life ==
Gowariker was born into a Marathi-speaking family to Ashok and Kishori Gowariker, in Kolhapur. He attended St. Theresa's High School in Bandra. Ashutosh is married to Sunita, Deb Mukherjee's daughter from his first marriage. They have two sons, Konark and Vishwang.

== Career ==
=== Actor ===
Gowariker started his career as an actor, making his debut in 1984 in director Ketan Mehta's picture Holi. On the Holi sets, Gowariker met Aamir Khan with whom he later went on to collaborate on different film projects . After that, he acted in several television serials, including Kacchi Dhoop (1987), Circus (1989), C.I.D. (1998) and several films, including Naam (1986), Goonj (1989), Chamatkar (1992), and Kabhi Haan Kabhi Naa (1993). He returned to acting by playing the lead role in the critically acclaimed Marathi comedy drama Ventilator (2016), which was produced by Priyanka Chopra. Allegedly, he took about 6 months to agree to do the film.

=== Director ===
==== Debut ====
Gowariker made his directorial debut with the thriller Pehla Nasha (1993), followed by another thriller Baazi (1995), both of which received negative reviews upon release and emerged as commercial disasters at the box-office.

==== Widespread success ====
His first film of the new millennium was the epic musical sports drama Lagaan, produced by and starring Aamir Khan alongside debutante Gracy Singh. The film revolved around the people of a small village in Victorian India who stake their future on a game of cricket against their ruthless British rulers. It received positive reviews from critics upon release, with praise for its direction, soundtrack, performances of the cast, and its anti-imperialist stance. The film emerged as a commercial success, grossing ₹65.97 crore (US$6.9 million) worldwide, ranking as the third highest-grossing Hindi film of the year. Lagaan earned Gowariker his first Filmfare Award for Best Director and the Filmfare Award for Best Story, in addition to the National Film Award for Best Popular Film Providing Wholesome Entertainment and the Filmfare Award for Best Film. Lagaan was also nominated for the Academy Award for Best International Feature Film, being the third, and as of 2023 the last, Indian film after Mother India (1957) and Salaam Bombay! (1988) to be nominated for the award.

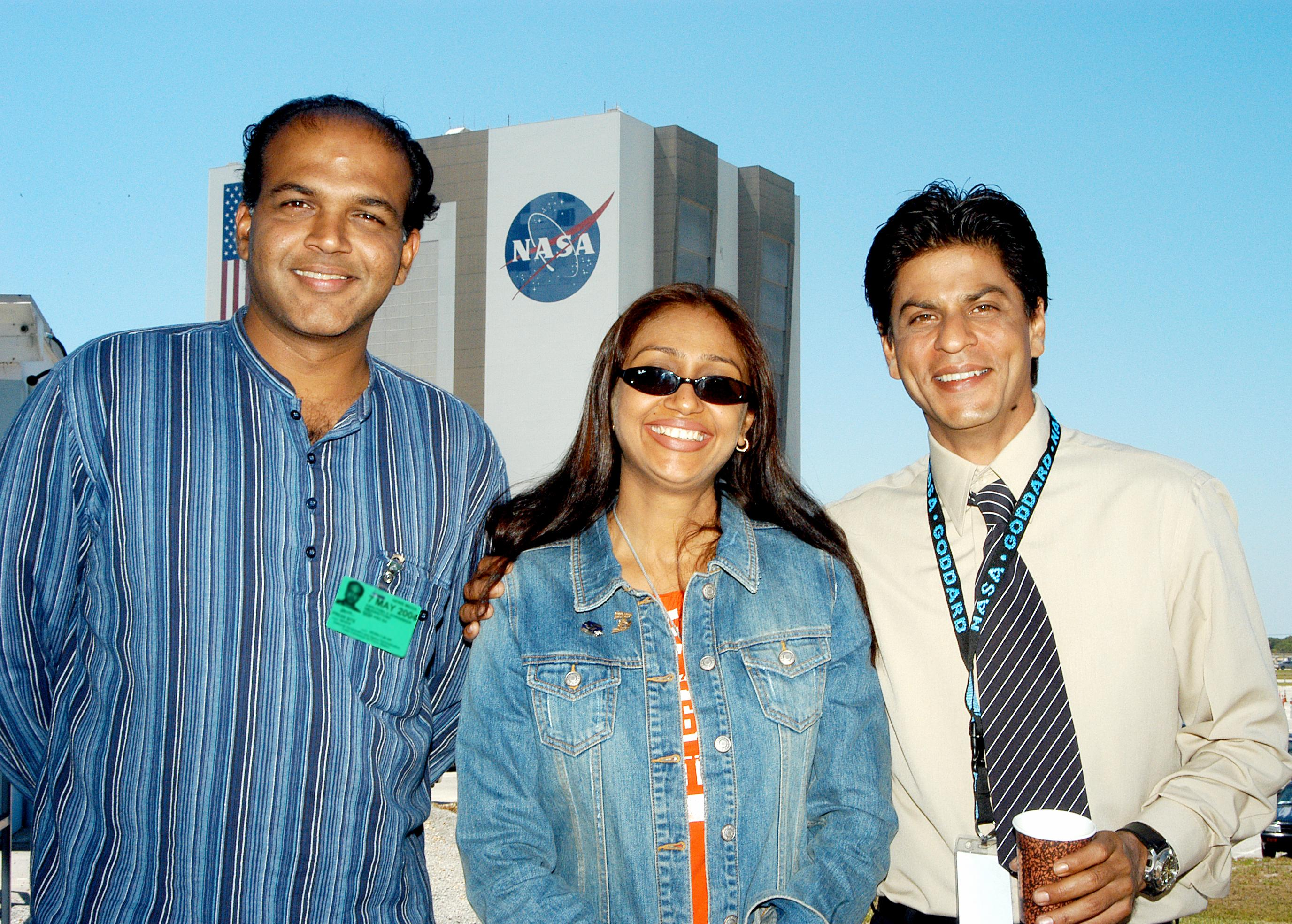
Ashutosh Gowariker, his wife Sunita and actor Shahrukh Khan pose for a photo with the Vehicle Assembly Building, Kennedy Space Center in the background during filming for the movie Swades

He next screenwrote and directed the social drama Swades (2004) starring Shahrukh Khan and debutante Gayatri Joshi in lead roles. The story of the film revolves around an NRI project manager at NASA, who returns to India to discover the challenges faced by a rural village, and dedicates himself to their development, addressing issues of education, healthcare, and infrastructure. The film received rave reviews from critics upon release, with praise for its direction, story, screenplay, soundtrack and performances of the cast. However, despite pre-release hype and good critical reception, it emerged as a commercial failure at the box office. Swades earned Gowariker his second nominations for the Filmfare Award for Best Film and Best Director. However, over the years, the film has achieved cult status.

Gowariker's next screenwriting and directorial venture was the epic historical romantic drama Jodhaa Akbar (2008) starring Hrithik Roshan and Aishwarya Rai in lead roles. Set in the 16th century, the film depicted the life and romance between the Muslim Emperor Akbar of Mughal Empire and the Hindu Princess Jodhaa Bai of Amber, who married him on a political marriage. It opened to widespread critical acclaim upon release, with high praise for its direction, soundtrack, cinematography, costume design, choreography and performances of the cast. The film emerged as a major commercial success at the box-office, grossing ₹115 crore (US$12 million) worldwide, ranking as the fourth highest-grossing Hindi film of the year. Jodhaa Akbar earned Gowariker his second Filmfare Award for Best Film and Best Director. The film was cited as "10 Great Bollywood Films of the 21st Century" by British Film Institute.

Gowariker's next venture was the romantic comedy What's Your Raashee? (2009) starring Priyanka Chopra (in 12 roles) alongside Harman Baweja. Based on the Gujarati novel Kimball Ravenswood by the playwright and novelist Madhu Rye, the film told the story of a Gujarati NRI who meets twelve potential brides, one from each zodiac sign, one of whom he must marry in ten days to save his brother from harm. It had its world premiere at the 2009 Toronto International Film Festival. The film opened to mixed reviews from critics upon release, with praise for its soundtrack and Chopra's performance, but criticism for its screenplay, runtime and pacing. It emerged as a below-average grosser at the box-office.

His next venture was the historical action-adventure Khelein Hum Jee Jaan Sey (2010) starring Abhishek Bachchan and Deepika Padukone in lead roles. The film was based on Manini Chatterjee's Do And Die: The Chittagong Uprising 1930-34, an account of the 1930 Chittagong armoury raid. It opened to mixed-to-negative reviews from critics upon release, and emerged as a commercial disaster at the box-office.

After a 6-year hiatus, Gowariker made his comeback with the period action-adventure Mohenjo Daro (2016) starring Roshan (in their second collaboration) alongside debutante Pooja Hegde in lead roles. Set in 2016 BC at the height of Indus Valley Civilisation, the film follows the story of a farmer who travels to the city of Mohenjo Daro, challenges the city's elite and fights against overwhelming odds to save the civilization. It received negative reviews from critics upon release, and emerged as Gowariker's second consecutive commercial disaster at the box-office.

His next venture was the epic war drama Panipat (2019) starring Arjun Kapoor, Sanjay Dutt and Kriti Sanon in lead roles. The film depicts the events that took place during the Third Battle of Panipat. It received negative reviews from critics upon release, and emerged as Gowariker's third consecutive commercial disaster at the box-office.

In 2024 Gowariker served as chairperson of the international jury at the 55th International Film Festival of India held from 20 November to 28 November.

His next directorial venture, starring Aamir Khan, is a Biographical Sports drama about cricketer Lala Amarnath, focusing on the 1952 India-Pakistan Test series.

== Filmography ==
=== Director ===
Year	Film	Director	Writer	Producer	Notes
1993	Pehla Nasha	Yes	Yes	No	
1995	Baazi	Yes	Yes	No	
2001	Lagaan	Yes	Yes	No	Nominated – Academy Award for Best International Feature Film; Filmfare Award for Best Film; Filmfare Award for Best Director; Filmfare Award for Best Story
2004	Swades	Yes	Yes	Yes	Nominated – Filmfare Award for Best Film; Nominated – Filmfare Award for Best Director
2008	Jodhaa Akbar	Yes	Yes	Yes	Filmfare Award for Best Film; Filmfare Award for Best Director
2009	What's Your Raashee?	Yes	Yes	Yes	
2010	Khelein Hum Jee Jaan Sey	Yes	Yes	Yes	Nominated – Zee Cine Award for Best Story
2014	Everest	No	Yes	Yes	TV series
2016	Mohenjo Daro	Yes	Yes	Yes	
2019	Panipat	Yes	Yes	Yes	
2022	Toolsidas Junior	No	Yes	Yes	National Film Award for Best Feature Film in Hindi

=== Actor ===
Year	Films and television series	Language	Role
2026	System	Hindi	Ravi Rajvansh
2025	April May 99	Marathi	Jaie's father
2025	Ata Thambaycha Naay!	Marathi	Udaykumar Shirurkar
2024	Manvat Murders	Marathi	Ramakant Kulkarni
2023	Kaala Paani	Hindi	Lt. Governor Zibran Qadri
2016	Ventilator	Marathi	Raja Kamerkar
1998–1999	C.I.D.	Hindi	Inspector Virendra
1998	Woh	Hindi	Ashutosh Dhar
1998	Sarkarnama	Marathi	
1995–2015	Aahat	Hindi	
1994	Kabhi Haan Kabhi Naa	Hindi	Imran Bilal
1994	Vazir	Marathi	
1992	Jaanam	Hindi	Arun S. Rao
1992	Chamatkar	Hindi	Monty
1991	Indrajeet	Hindi	
1991	Jeeva Sakha	Marathi	Nagojirao "Nagya" Patil
1989	Circus	Hindi	Vicky
1989	Gawaahi	Hindi	Sayed Akhtar Rampuri
1989	Salim Langde Pe Mat Ro	Hindi	Abdul
1989	Kamla Ki Maut	Hindi	Deepak
1989	Indradhanush	Hindi	Mr. Appuswamy
1989	Ek Ratra Mantarleli	Marathi	Shekhar
1989	Goonj	Hindi	Sammy
1988	Bharat Ek Khoj	Hindi	Prince Siddhartha / Buddha
1987	Kachchi Dhoop	Hindi	
1987	West Is West	English	
1986	Naam	Hindi	Jai Singh Kalewar
1984	Holi	Hindi	Ranjeet Prakash

== Awards ==
Film	Award	Category	Result	Ref.
Lagaan	Bengal Film Journalists' Association Awards	Best Director (Hindi)	Won	
Lagaan	Bergen International Film Festival	The Jury's Award	Won	
Lagaan	European Film Academy	Best Non-European Film	Nominated	
Lagaan	47th Filmfare Awards	Best Film	Won	
Lagaan	47th Filmfare Awards	Best Director	Won	
Lagaan	47th Filmfare Awards	Best Story	Won	
Lagaan	3rd IIFA Awards	Best Film	Won	
Lagaan	3rd IIFA Awards	Best Director	Won	
Lagaan	3rd IIFA Awards	Best Story	Won	
Lagaan	Leeds International Film Festival	Audience Award	Won	
Lagaan	Locarno International Film Festival	Audience Award	Won	
Lagaan	49th National Film Awards	Best Popular Film Providing Wholesome Entertainment	Won	
Lagaan	NatFilm Festival	Audience Award	Won	
Lagaan	Portland International Film Festival	Audience Award	Won	
Lagaan	Screen Awards	Best Film	Won	
Lagaan	Screen Awards	Best Director	Won	
Lagaan	Screen Awards	Best Story	Nominated	
Lagaan	Screen Awards	Best Screenplay	Won	
Lagaan	Screen Awards	Best Dialogue	Nominated	
Lagaan	Zee Cine Awards	Best Film	Won	
Lagaan	Zee Cine Awards	Best Director	Won	
Lagaan	Zee Cine Awards	Best Story	Won	
Swades	50th Filmfare Awards	Best Film	Nominated	
Swades	50th Filmfare Awards	Best Director	Nominated	
Swades	Zee Cine Awards	Best Director (Critics)	Won	
Swades	Zee Cine Awards	Best Story	Won	
Swades	Stardust Awards	Dream Director	Won	
Jodhaa Akbar	54th Filmfare Awards	Best Film	Won	
Jodhaa Akbar	54th Filmfare Awards	Best Director	Won	
Jodhaa Akbar	10th IIFA Awards	Best Film	Won	
Jodhaa Akbar	10th IIFA Awards	Best Director	Won	
Jodhaa Akbar	Producers Guild Film Awards	Best Film	Nominated	
Jodhaa Akbar	Producers Guild Film Awards	Best Director	Nominated	
Jodhaa Akbar	Golden Minbar International Film Festival	Best Film – Grand Pix	Won	
Jodhaa Akbar	São Paulo International Film Festival	Audience Award for Best Foreign Feature Film	Won	
Jodhaa Akbar	Screen Awards	Best Film	Won	
Jodhaa Akbar	Screen Awards	Best Director	Won	
Jodhaa Akbar	Stardust Awards	Best Film of the Year	Nominated	
Jodhaa Akbar	Stardust Awards	Best Director	Nominated	
Jodhaa Akbar	Stardust Awards	Dream Director	Won	
Jodhaa Akbar	V. Shantaram Awards	Best Director Bronze Award	Won	
Khelein Hum Jee Jaan Sey	Zee Cine Awards	Best Story	Nominated	
Ventilator	Filmfare Marathi Awards	Filmfare Award for Best Supporting Actor – Marathi	Nominated	

Awards
Filmfare Awards
Preceded by Rakesh Roshan for Kaho Naa... Pyaar Hai	Best Director for Lagaan; 2001	Succeeded by Sanjay Leela Bhansali for Devdas
Preceded by Honey Irani for Kya Kehna	Best Story for Lagaan; 2001	Succeeded by Jaideep Sahni for Company
Preceded by Aamir Khan for Taare Zameen Par	Best Director for Jodhaa Akbar; 2009	Succeeded by Rajkumar Hirani for 3 Idiots
