= Jodhaa Akbar =

2008 Indian historical fictional drama film by Ashutosh Gowariker

- Theatrical release poster
- Directed by: Ashutosh Gowariker
- Screenplay by: Haidar Ali; Ashutosh Gowariker
- Dialogues by: K. P. Saxena
- Story by: Haidar Ali
- Produced by: Ronnie Screwvala; Ashutosh Gowariker
- Starring: Hrithik Roshan; Aishwarya Rai Bachchan
- Narrated by: Amitabh Bachchan
- Cinematography: Kiran Deohans
- Edited by: Baldev Saluja
- Music by: A. R. Rahman
- Production company: Ashutosh Gowariker Productions Private Limited
- Distributed by: UTV Motion Pictures
- Release date: 15 February 2008
- Running time: 214 minutes
- Country: India
- Language: Hindi
- Budget: ₹40 crore
- Box office: est. ₹120 crore

Jodhaa Akbar is a 2008 Indian Hindi-language epic historical drama film directed by Ashutosh Gowariker. It stars Hrithik Roshan and Aishwarya Rai Bachchan in the titular roles. Set in the 16th century, the film shows the fictional life and love between the Muslim Emperor Akbar of the Mughal Empire and a Hindu Princess Jodhaa Bai of Amber, and their political marriage. A. R. Rahman composed the musical score which proved to be critically and commercially successful. The film marks the second collaboration between Roshan and Rai Bachchan after Dhoom 2 (2006).

Jodhaa Akbar was released theatrically worldwide on 15 February 2008. Upon release, it was a critical and commercial success and became the fourth highest-grossing Hindi film of 2008.

Jodhaa Akbar won the Audience Award for Best Foreign Language Film at the São Paulo International Film Festival and two awards at the Golden Minbar International Film Festival. At the 56th National Film Awards, it won two awards for Best Choreography (Chinni Prakash and Rekha Prakash for "Azeem-o-Shaan Shahenshah") and Best Costume Design (Neeta Lulla). At the 54th Filmfare Awards, it received 11 nominations and won 5 awards, including Best Film, Best Director (Gowariker) and Best Actor (Roshan). It also won 10 International Indian Film Academy Awards and 7 Star Screen Awards, in addition to two nominations at the 3rd Asian Film Awards.

== Plot ==
Jalaluddin Mohammad, the young ruler of the Mughal Empire, is raised under the strict tutelage of military commander Bairam Khan, who teaches him to rule with an iron fist and execute defeated soldiers. Years later, after securing a victory in a battle, Akbar defies Bairam Khan for the first time, choosing instead to govern through mercy, respect, and diplomacy.

In the Rajput Kingdom of Amber, Raja Bharmal announces that his son, Bhagwant Das, will succeed him as heir. Slighted by this decision, Sujamal, his nephew and the rightful heir to the throne, abandons the kingdom and allies with Sharifuddin Hussain, Jalaluddin's ambitious brother-in-law who desires to ascend the Mughal throne. Facing an imminent invasion, Raja Bharmal extends a peace offering to Jalaluddin, proposing an alliance sealed by the marriage of his daughter, Princess Jodhaa, to the Emperor. Jalaluddin accepts the proposal, but the move shatters Amber's alliance with neighbouring Rajput rulers, including Rana Uday Singh. Resenting her role as a mere political pawn, Jodhaa writes a letter to Sujamal begging him to rescue her from the alliance, though she ultimately decides against sending it.

Prior to the wedding, Jodhaa requests a private audience with Jalaluddin and sets two strict conditions: she must be permitted to maintain her Hindu faith after marriage, and a shrine dedicated to Lord Krishna must be constructed for her inside the Agra Fort. To her surprise, Jalaluddin grants both requests. Following the grand wedding, Jodhaa remains emotionally distant, and the couple leaves their marriage unconsummated. Recognizing her hesitation, Jalaluddin reassures her that he will wait until she accepts him whole-heartedly.

Meanwhile, Adham Khan, Jalaluddin's foster brother and the son of his powerful chief nanny Maham Anga, murders the Prime Minister Atgah Khan to conceal his corruption. Outraged by his betrayal, Jalaluddin personally orders Adham Khan to be thrown off the palace walls to his death. Watching from afar, Jodhaa finds herself torn between shock at Jalaluddin's sudden display of violence and deep respect for his uncompromising stance on justice.

Profoundly hostile towards Jodhaa's growing influence, Maham Anga plots to ruin her marriage. She discovers Jodhaa's unsent letter to Sujamal and secretly dispatches it. When Sujamal arrives at the palace to meet his cousin, Maham Anga convinces Jalaluddin that Jodhaa is meeting a secret lover. Jalaluddin sends guards to capture Sujamal and banishes Jodhaa, who refuses to defend her character.

Upon discovering Maham Anga's deception, a repentant Jalaluddin strips her of her authority and travels to Amber to apologize. Though she appreciates his gesture, Jodhaa refuses to return immediately, advising him instead to truly understand his subjects and the governance of his empire. Taking her advice, Jalaluddin wanders among the common people disguised as a traveler. He learns of the non-Muslim citizens' deep resentment over the discriminatory pilgrimage tax. In response, he abolishes the tax across the empire, declaring religious freedom for all the citizens. Moved by his genuine change of heart, Jodhaa returns to Agra. Recognizing his benevolence, the people bestow upon him the title Akbar (transl. The Great). During a public celebration, an assassin dispatched by Sharifuddin shoots Akbar with a poisoned arrow. Jodhaa personally nurses him back to health, and during his convalescence, the two deeply fall in love.

Meanwhile, Sharifuddin and his rebel confederacy prepare to launch a surprise invasion of Amber. Overhearing Sharifuddin plotting to assassinate Akbar, Sujamal regrets his treason and rides off to warn Akbar. Sharifuddin's soldiers pursue Sujamal, mortally wounding him with arrows, but he survives long enough to reach Akbar and expose the plot before succumbing to his wounds.

Akbar leads his army into battle and confronts Sharifuddin, defeating him in combat. For the sake of his half-sister, Bakshi Banu Begum, Akbar spares Sharifuddin's life but strips him of his titles and land. With the rebellion crushed, Akbar formally proclaims a new era of religious tolerance, harmony, and mutual respect across Hindustan.

== Cast ==
- Hrithik Roshan as Emperor Akbar
  - Parth Dave as young Akbar
- Aishwarya Rai Bachchan as Rajkumari Jodhaa Bai
  - Rucha Vaidya as young Jodhaa Bai
- Sonu Sood as Rajkumar Sujamal
- Kulbhushan Kharbanda as Raja Veer Bharmal
- Suhasini Mulay as Rani Padmavati, Jodhaa's mother
- Raza Murad as Shamshuddin Atgah Khan
- Poonam Sinha as Malika Hamida Banu Begum
- Rajesh Vivek as Chugtai Khan, Akbar's commander
- Pramod Moutho as Todar Mal, finance minister in Akbar's court
- Ila Arun as Maham Anga
- Nikitin Dheer as Sharifuddin Hussain
- Digvijay Purohit as Raja Bhagwant Das
- Yuri Suri as Bairam Khan
- Surendra Pal as Rana Uday Singh, a Rajputana ruler
- Vishwa Mohan Badola as Sadir Adasi, Akbar's courtier and Hussain's ally
- Prathmesh Mehta as Chandrabhan Singh
- Shaji Chaudhary as Adham Khan
- Manava Naik as Neelakshi, Jodhaa's servant
- Disha Vakani as Madhavi, Jodhaa's servant
- Kavi Kumar Azad as a wheat seller whom Akbar chances upon during his tour in guise
- Abir Abrar as Bakshi Banu Begum
- Indrajit Sarkar as Mahesh Das / Birbal
- Aman Dhaliwal as Rajkumar Ratan Singh
- Pradeep Sharma as Sheikh Mubarak
- Balraj as Raja Balraj Singh
- Sudhanshu Hakku as Raja of Shimalmarg Kingdom
- Syed Badr-ul Hasan Khan Bahadur as Mulla Do-Piyaza
- Dilnaz Irani as Salima
- Tejpal Singh Rawat as Ni'Mat, head eunuch in Agra fort
- Shehzor Ali as Hemu
- Ulhas Barve as Raja of Mankeshwar
- Jassi Singh as Raja of Bhadra Kingdom
- Raju Pandit as Raja of Bhati Kingdom
- Bharat Kumar as Raja Chauhan
- Rajiv Sehgal as Raja of Virat Kingdom
- Adivi sesh as backgroung song cast
- Amitabh Bachchan as Narrator (in voice)

== Production ==
=== Origin and scripting ===
Following the success of Lagaan (2001), its director Ashutosh Gowariker was approached by actor and screenwriter Haidar Ali with the idea of making a film along the lines of K. Asif's historical epic, Mughal-e-Azam (1960). (Note: Haidar Ali had acted with Gowariker in Saeed Akhtar Mirza's 1989 drama film, Salim Langde Pe Mat Ro.) When Gowariker contemplated on whether he should make a sequel to Mughal-e-Azam or remake it, Ali suggested that he can do a prequel to it; Gowariker agreed and decided to create a screenplay that would cover the early years of Akbar's life from 13 to 21 years of age. In an interview with Syed Firdaus Ashraf of Rediff.com, Ali said on his decision to work with Gowariker:

Ashutosh is the only director who could do justice to a film of such a level. In Lagaan, he touched on the issue of casteism, the oppressed class, Hindu-Muslim unity, communal harmony, team spirit, management and nationalism. He weaved all this beautifully to make a hit film without preaching or lecturing. In the same way, I told him he could make a beautiful film by touching on such issues without preaching.

Gowariker had already finished his script for Swades (2004) when Ali pitched the idea. As a result, he decided to start his work with Ali after completing it. In December 2001, Ali began research on the marriage of princess Jodhabai, daughter of the Rajput ruler of Amer, Bharmal with the Mughal emperor Akbar, and prepared a basic story on the couple. One month after Swades was released, Ali met Gowariker and handed to him the story. Gowariker subsequently announced his next project, terming it "a romantic musical", titled Jodhaa Akbar.

In March 2005, Gowariker started work on the screenplay with Ali while denying speculations that Firoz A. Nadiadwala and Subhash Ghai were producing the film. It was confirmed later in August 2006 that Gowariker would co-produce the film himself under his banner AGPPL productions with Ronnie Screwvala of UTV Motion Pictures, in addition to the latter distributing it. Ali and Gowariker completed the script in November 2005 and sought the help of Bhawani Singh, the Maharaja of Jaipur and his spouse, Maharani Padmini Devi to provide them with "creative inputs to make Jodhaa Akbar as realistic as possible." (Note: In a rather contrariwise interview with Sudipta Datta of The Financial Express, Gowariker says that it took him "two and a half years to script". This was because he changed it continuously so as to accommodate production demands and constraints.) K. P. Saxena was hired to write the film's dialogues.

=== Cast and crew ===
Hrithik Roshan and Aishwarya Rai were the first choice of both Ali and Gowariker for portraying Akbar and Jodhabai respectively. Gowariker believed Roshan possessed the regal bearing and physique required to play the role of a king. According to Gowariker, Roshan immediately agreed after the former merely mentioned that he was doing a film on Akbar; it would mark Roshan's first collaboration with producer Ronnie Screwvala, who was previously a co-producer on UTV–presented Lakshya (2004). Roshan learned Urdu as a means of preparing for his role. For casting Rai, Gowariker sent her an SMS asking "Will U B My Jodha?" to which Rai sent a reply stating "Yes, I will" followed by a smiley. Sonu Sood was chosen to play Jodhabai's cousin brother Rajkumar Sujamal. Sood had rejected offers to feature in other projects as he wanted to fully involve himself in the film.

The role of Akbar's mother, Hamida Banu Begum, was first offered to Saira Banu, who declined citing family commitments as her reason. The role subsequently went to Poonam Sinha which marked a comeback for her to acting since her brief stint in the 1970s. Actress and singer Ila Arun had wanted to work with Gowariker and approached him for a role in the film; Gowariker cast her as Akbar's nurse, Maham Anga. Nikitin Dheer was selected to play Sharifuddin Hussain, the rebellious brother-in-law of Akbar, after impressing Gowariker during the auditions. Kulbhushan Kharbanda portrayed Raja Bharmal while Suhasini Mulay was cast as Jodhabai's mother, Rani Padmavati. Actress Abir Abrar, niece of actress Kumkum, was selected to play Bakshi Banu Begum, Akbar's sister and Hussain's wife. Indrajeet Sarkar was cast in the role of Birbal, but his scenes were cut from the film's final version to reduce its duration.

A. R. Rahman, Javed Akhtar, Nitin Chandrakant Desai and Ballu Saluja were signed up as the music composer, lyricist for the songs, art director and editor respectively, thereby collaborating with Gowariker for the third time after Lagaan and Swades. Visual Computing Labs (VCL), a division of Tata Elxsi, were in charge of the film's special effects. Kiran Deohans, known for his work in Qayamat Se Qayamat Tak (1988), Aks (2001) and Kabhi Khushi Kabhie Gham (2001), was the film's cinematographer. Gowariker chose Ravi Dewan to be the stunt co-ordinator for Jodhaa Akbar based on the latter's experience in handling historical films, such as 1942: A Love Story (1994). Chinni Prakash and his wife Rekha, Raju Khan and Ash Kumar were the film's choreographers.

=== Costume design ===
Neeta Lulla, who had earlier worked with Rai in Sanjay Leela Bhansali's Devdas (2002), was chosen to handle the film's costume designing. Lulla found Jodhaa Akbar to be "one of the most challenging films" she had done. This was because she had to design costumes not only for the lead actress, but for every cast member involved in the film. Lulla did extensive research for a year and a half on the type of clothes people wore during the Mughal Empire. She went to Jaipur to procure information on what type of fabrics were worn during that period. She schematically designed clothes by providing yellow, orange and red colours for the Rajputs and gold, brown and beige colours for the Mughals.

Keeping in mind the grandeur of the Mughal Empire during Akbar's time, Lulla used the Zardozi and Kundan types of embroidery for Roshan's and Rai's dresses. The fabrics for designing the costumes as well as the shoes were bought from Delhi, Mumbai and Jaipur, while authentic embroidered Mojaris were used for footwear. Lulla designed clothes of dark brown, black and green colours for the character of Sharifuddin Hussain after taking the characters' persona into consideration.

The jewellery used for the costumes were purchased from the jewellery brand company Tanishq. Jodhaa Akbar marked the company's second venture into films after the fantasy film Paheli (2005). A team of 200 craftsmen worked for 600 days to fashion and mould jewels made of gold gemstones. Around 300 kilograms of jewels were used. Rai and Roshan wore thirteen and eight sets of jewels respectively throughout the film. The set, which Aishwarya wore in the scene where Jodhabai is wedded to Akbar weighed 3.5 kilograms. Rai later mentioned in subsequent interviews that the toughest part of playing her character was to wear the jewellery as she found them quite heavy to bedeck. The jewels were designed using miniature paintings from Mughal literature and Akbar's autobiography by Abu'l-Fazl ibn Mubarak, the Akbarnama as influences. The scabbards used by the lead actors in the film weighed two kilograms.

=== Principal photography ===
Filming commenced in early November 2006 at Jaipur with the climax sequence with Roshan and Dheer, and the Second Battle of Panipat. Palace scenes featuring Rai as Jodhabai before her marriage to Akbar were filmed at the Roopangarh Fort in Kishangarh. The sequence featuring the Battle of Panipat was shot in the Dhula region located on the outskirts of Jaipur. To prepare for their fight sequences, Roshan and Rai learnt sword-fighting and horse-riding a month before filming began at Mehboob Studio and Mahalaxmi Racecourse respectively. Rai had learnt sword-fighting and horse-riding while filming The Last Legion (2007) because of which she had little difficulty in her preparations.

Dewan worked with Desai in designing the armour and ammunitions. The cannons were made of carbon fibre with iron inserted on the inner portions to make sure the cannonballs were fired smoothly. The swords were initially made of both wood and fibre but were later made of lightweight carbon fibre due to the actors not being able to manoeuvre them easily. All of the stunt sequences were rehearsed every day from 3 am to 7 am before they were filmed. A team of 250 stuntmen and 5,000 extras were used for all the battle scenes, which were filmed for 20–30 days at a stretch. Ashutosh wanted the climax to be perfect because of which the extras, who were people from nearby villages and were used for Akbar's and Hussain's armies, would often get tired standing in the same position for an entire day. Some of them would not be present the next day. As a result, Dewan placed the 250 stuntmen in the front rows of both armies so as not to show how exhausted the villagers were.

Deohans employed six cameras to film the climax scene from different angles. He was influenced by films such as Gladiator (2000) and Troy (2004) as he found the "basic colour" of those films' locations similar to that of Rajasthan's arid surroundings. The lighting was used depending on the scenes filmed. Further shooting took place at Sambhar Lake Town, and the forts of Amber, Amer and Agra. The scene where Akbar prays to the Islamic scholar Moinuddin Chishti for a successful conquest of India was filmed at the Ajmer Sharif Dargah.

After the completion of the first schedule of filming—which took in 60 days—by the end of December 2006, the second schedule began on 8 January 2007 at Desai's ND Studios based in Karjat. Desai took "lakhs of photographs" of Amer Fort and Agra fort. Using the photos as reference, he erected sets consisting of the inner portions of both places in his studio. Filming could not take place entirely at the forts due to heavy traffic of tourists coming there every day. Consequentially, only the outer portions of both the forts were filmed on the spot during the first schedule while the scenes featuring the inner portions were filmed at Karjat. The inner portions that were erected by Desai included the Dīwān-e-Ām, Dīwān-e-Khās, Jodhaabai's inner chambers and the fort's gardens. The entire set measured 1,600 feet long, 600 feet wide and 68 feet high, which according to Desai was equivalent to "seven floors of a high-rise". Concrete, fibre and asbestos sheets were the materials used to create the interiors of the forts. The cost of the entire set at Karjat was estimated to be around ₹120 million.

The song "Azeem-O-Shaan Shahenshah", which was choreographed by Prakash, featured about 12 assistant choreographers, 400 dancers and 2,000 extras acting as the citizens of Agra. Prakash used the dance steps featured in the songs of films such as Ganga Jamuna (1961) and Guide (1965) as reference. The song was planned to be finished within 10 days but took 15 days to complete as Prakash felt it was "difficult to stick to a deadline when you have a crowd this big." He credited his team for finishing the song as he believed it would have taken "a month" to film without their co-operation. The music video for "Azeem-O-Shaan Shahenshah" had a production cost of ₹25 million ($575,000). It was the most expensive Bollywood music video at the time, matching "Dola Re Dola" from Devdas (2002).

A total of 80 elephants, 100 horses and 55 camels were employed throughout the entire film. The battle scene featuring Roshan and Ulhas Barve, who plays the King of Mankeshwar, Chittorgarh district, was filmed in June 2007 at Jaipur. Shooting was completed in October–November 2007 at Karjat. Due to the amount of money spent on the costumes and sets, the budget of the film, which was initially ₹370 million, increased to ₹400 million.

== Soundtrack ==
The score and soundtrack of the film was composed by A. R. Rahman, making his third collaboration with Ashutosh Gowariker after Lagaan, and Swades. The official soundtrack contains five songs and two instrumentals. Rahman scored the prewritten lyrics by Javed Akhtar, except for the songs "Khwaja Mere Khwaja" which was written by Kashif. The music was released on 9 January 2008 and the CDs were out by 18 January. According to the Indian trade website Box Office India, with around 1,100,000 units sold, this film's soundtrack album was the year's fourteenth highest-selling.

The film emerged out as the biggest winner in many music awards. However, in the best music direction category, it lost many mainly to Jaane Tu... Ya Jaane Na, composed by Rahman himself. The fine background score won the film several awards including Filmfare Best Background Score and IIFA Best Background Score. The soundtrack was also nominated in numerous categories.

== Historical accuracy ==
Many of the events portrayed in the movie are fictional. Certain Hindu groups revolted and claimed Jodhaa was married to Akbar's son, Jahangir and was a non-Rajput, born to a concubine of low caste. However that name of that wife of Jahangir is proposed as 'Jodh Bai' not 'Jodhaa Bai' .

Several historians claim that none of Akbar's wives was known as "Jodhaa Bai" during the Mughal period, she was referred to with her title of Mariam-uz-Zamani. According to Professor Shirin Moosvi, a historian of Aligarh Muslim University, neither the Akbarnama (a biography of Akbar commissioned by Akbar himself) nor any historical text from the period refer to her as Jodhaa Bai. Moosvi notes that the name "Jodhaa Bai" was first used to refer to Akbar's wife in the 18th and 19th centuries in historical writings.

In the Tuzk-e-Jahangiri (autobiography of Jahangir, c.1624), the author refers to her with no name, rather the epithet Mariam-uz-Zamani. According to Ruby Lal (2008), "The only document that names the mother of Jahangir is a later edict issued by Mariam-uz-Zamani. The seal on the edict reads 'Wali Nimat Begum, Walideh Nur al-Din Jahangir', thus clearly identifying Mariam-uz-Zamani with Wali Nimat Begum and unequivocally declaring her to be Jahangir's mother".

According to historian Imtiaz Ahmad, the director of the Khuda Baksh Oriental Public Library in Patna, the name "Jodhaa" was used for Akbar's wife for the first time by Lieutenant-Colonel James Tod, in his book Annals and Antiquities of Rajasthan. According to Ahmad, Tod was not a professional historian. N. R. Farooqi claims that Jodhaa Bai was not the name of Akbar's queen; it was the name of Jahangir's non-Rajput wife.

Ashutosh Gowarikar's reaction was:

While making the film I did my best to go by the book. I consulted the best historians and went through the most rigorous research. There are different names used for Akbar's wife, Jodhaa being one of them. In fact, there's a disclaimer about the queen's name and real caste at the beginning of the film. But to see that, the protesters have to see the film.

== Protests and legal issues ==
The portrayal of ethnic Rajput people in the movie was criticised by members of the Rajput community as misleading, politically motivated historical revisionism that minimised Rajput history. The community's protests against the film in some states led to the film being banned in the states of Uttar Pradesh, Rajasthan, Haryana and Uttarakhand. However, the producer went to the Supreme Court to challenge it. Later, the Supreme Court of India lifted the ban on screening the film in Uttar Pradesh and some towns of Uttarakhand and Haryana. The court scrapped the Uttar Pradesh government ban as well as similar orders by authorities in Dehradun, Uttarakhand and Ambala, Sonepat and Rewari, Haryana.

== Other versions ==
Owing to the film’s success, the film was dubbed and released into Telugu and Tamil languages under the same title.

== Reception ==
=== Critical reception ===
As of June 2020, the film holds a 75% approval rating on Rotten Tomatoes, based on 16 reviews with an average rating of 6.83/10. The film received a critics' rating of 69 on Metacritic based on 4 reviews.

Anil Sinanan of The Times gave the film four out of five stars, stating, "Oscar-nominated Lagaan (2001) director Ashutosh Gowariker's sumptuous period epic has all the ingredients of a Cecil B. DeMille entertainer [...] The film ends with a passionate plea for tolerance of all religions in India, a resonant message for modern India." Rajeev Masand of CNN-IBN also gave the film four out of five stars, commenting: "I've never felt this way about any other film, but sitting there in my seat watching Jodhaa Akbar, I felt privileged as a moviegoer. Privileged that such a film had been made, and privileged that it had been made in our times so we can form our own opinions of the film rather than adopt the opinions of previous generations, which we invariably must when looking at older classics." Tajpal Rathore of the BBC gave the film four out of five stars, noting that, "although the 16th-century love story upon which it's based might be long forgotten, this endearing treatment sears into the memory through sheer size and scale alone [...] Don't let the running time put you off watching this unashamedly epic tale." Nikhat Kazmi of The Times of India gave the film three stars, stating that, "Jodhaa Akbar works only because its heart is in the right place. The film talks about a love that transcends all barriers – gender, religion, culture – and dreams of an India where secularism and tolerance are the twin towers that should never ever crumble. And Akbar and Jodhaa are the alluring exponents of this dream." Kazmi also suggests that "if you are willing to shed off all the trappings of history, only then will Jodhaa Akbar work for you." While suggesting that the film is "too long" and that it is "not a history lesson," Rachel Saltz of The New York Times also notes, "in choosing to tell the tale of this emperor and a Muslim-Hindu love story, Mr. Gowariker makes a clear point. As Akbar says, 'Respect for each other's religion will enrich Hindustan.'"

The Tamil dubbed version also received mixed reviews. Reviewing the Tamil version, Behindwoods gave 4 out of 5 stars stating that "A visual feast and an intoxicating love story."

=== Box office ===
Jodhaa Akbar collected a gross revenue of ₹77.85 crore (US$20.82 million) in India. Box Office India declared it a hit at the domestic box office. Its domestic net income was ₹ 56.04 crore, equivalent to ₹86.28 crore (US$9.0 million) adjusted for inflation.

Overseas, it grossed US$7.56 million (₹ 49.92 crore), and was declared a blockbuster at the overseas box office. Its overseas gross included US$2.1 million in the United Kingdom, US$3.45 million in North America, US$450,000 in Australia, and US$1.1 million in the Arab States of the Persian Gulf region.

The film ended its box office run with a worldwide lifetime gross of ₹112 crore (equivalent to ₹312 crore or US$32 million in 2023), equivalent to US$28.37 million at the time.

== See also ==
- Jodha Akbar (TV series)
