= Chittagong Central Jail =

Major prison in Chittagong, Bangladesh

Chattogram Central Jail
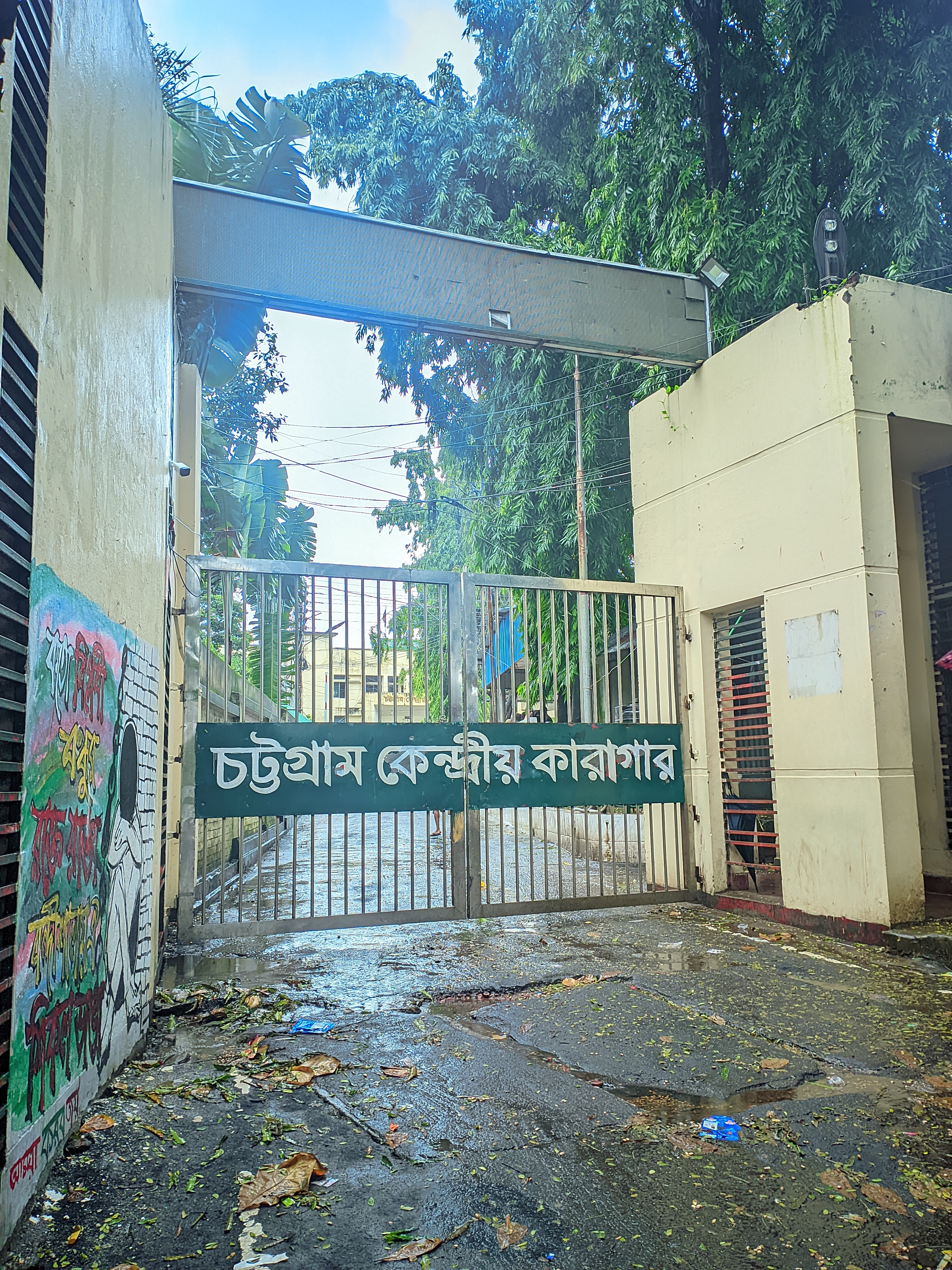
- Chattogram Central Jail gate in 2024
- Interactive map of Chattogram Central Jail
- Location: East side of Laldighi, Kotwali Thana
- Status: 22.337186°N 91.839458°E
- Security class: Maximum
- Opened: 1885
- Former name: Chittagong Central Jail
- Managed by: Bangladesh Prisons
- Website: prison.chittagong.gov.bd

Chattogram Central Jail (Bengali: চট্টগ্রাম কেন্দ্রীয় কারাগার) is a central jail located on the eastern side of Lal Dighi, Chittagong in Bangladesh. In terms of inmates, it is the second-largest jail in the country.

== History ==
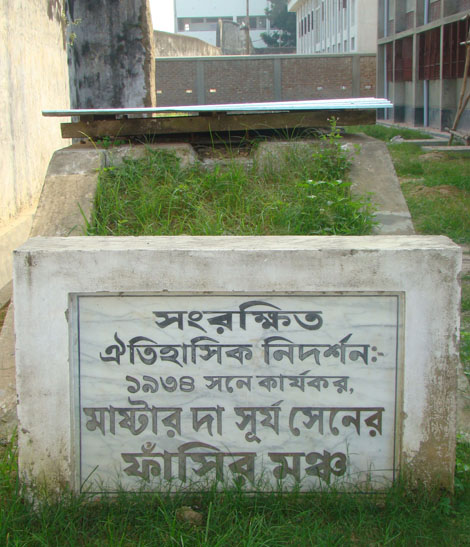
Image of the memorial plaque at the place where Surya Sen was hanged.

Originally known as the Chittagong District Jail, it was founded in 1885. Following Bangladesh's independence, it was later renamed Chittagong Central Jail on September 16, 1999.

On 12 January 1934, Surya Sen, a revolutionary of the anti-British movement and one of his associates, Tarakeswar Dastidar, were hanged in this Jail.

== Infrastructure and capacity ==
The total area of Chattogram Central Jail is 16.87 acres. The detention capacity here is 1753 people. But there are 9,000 prisoners on average. In 1998, Bangladesh government constructed 6 prison buildings with 5 floors and one cell building with 2 floors namely Padma, Meghna, Jamuna, Karnaphuli, Halda, Sangu. It also has 100 bedded hospital.
