= Rajat Sen =

Indian Bengali revolutionary

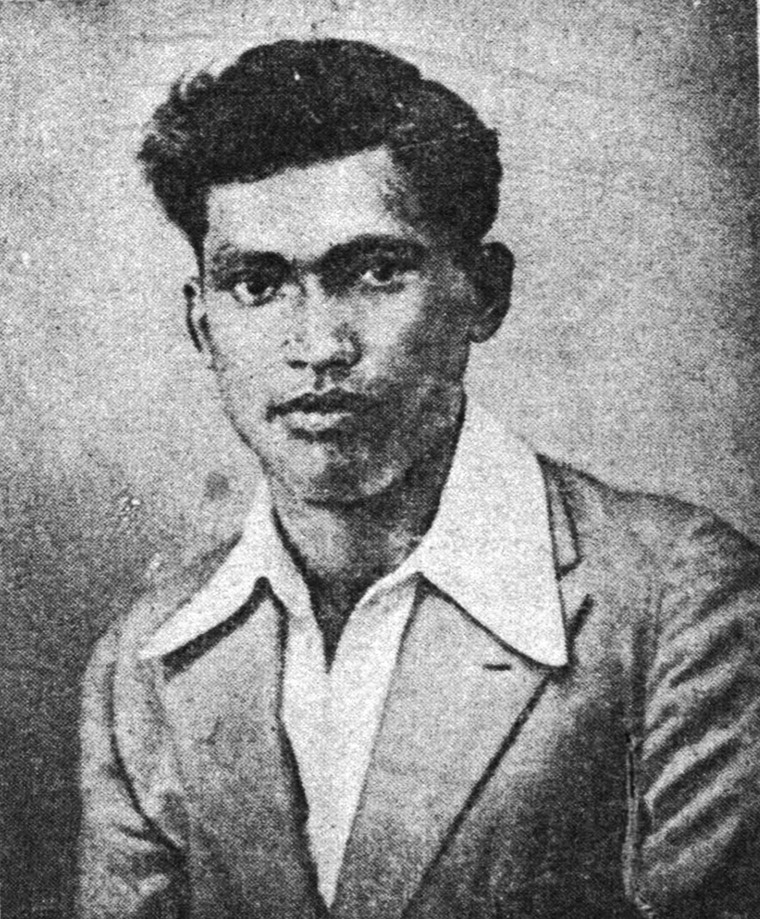
Freedom fighter Rajat Sen

Rajat Sen (1913 ― 6 May 1930) alias Rajat Kumar Sen was a Bengali revolutionary who joined in the Chittagong armoury raid. He died in a Kalarpole encounter with the Indian Imperial Police.

== Revolutionary activities ==
Rajat Sen was born in British India in 1913. He hailed from Feringibazar, Chittagong, his father's name was Ranjan Lal Sen. Sen joined in revolutionary politics against the British rule while studying in intermediate class. He took active participation in the Chittagong Uprising led by Masterda Surya Sen. Being a member of Masterda's Indian Republican Army he took part in the Armoury raid on 18 April 1930 and an armed encounter in Jalalabad hill on 22 April 1930. After the encounter Sen along with his comrades retired to the village with great difficulty after successfully evading police and military surveillance.

== Death ==
Police chased them on 6 May 1930. Sen secretly took shelter in a village beside Karnafuli River with his three friends Swadeshranjan Ray, Deba Gupta and Monoranjan Sen. They tried to escape and entered a bamboo grove in Kalarpole. While police arrived, there was a sharp exchange of fire and Sen, Deba Gupta, Monoranjan died. The fourth Swadesh died in police custody next day.
