= Lokenath Bal =

Indian revolutionary (1908–1964)

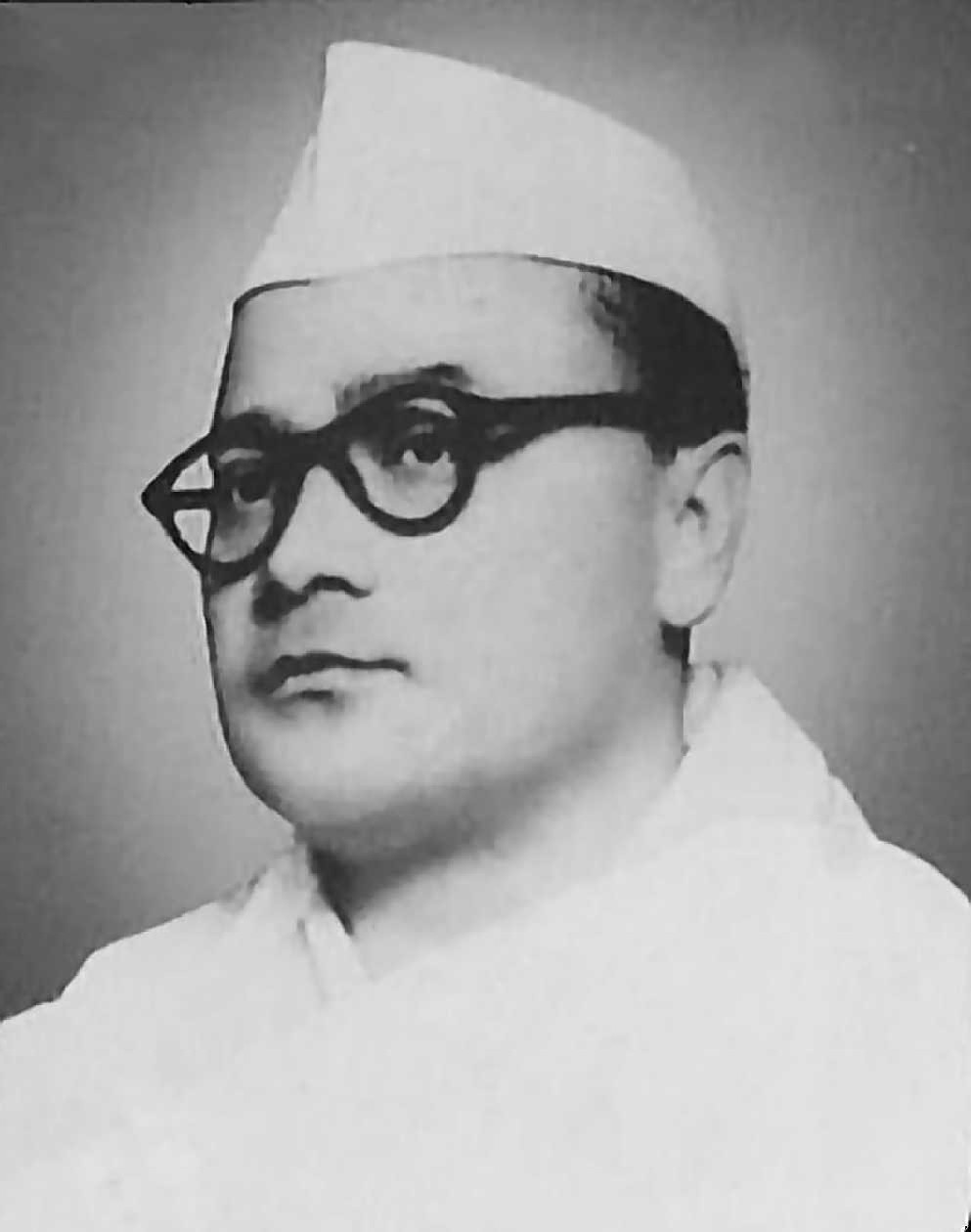

Second Deputy Commissioner of the Calcutta Corporation
- In office 1 May 1952 to 19 July 1962
- Preceded by: Prankrishna Bal

Personal details
- Born: 8 March 1908 Chittagong, Eastern Bengal and Assam, British India
- Died: 4 September 1964 (aged 56) Calcutta, West Bengal, India
- Party: Indian National Congress

Lokenath Bal (Bengali: লোকনাথ বল) (8 March 1908 – 4 September 1964) was an Indian independence activist and a member of the armed resistance movement led by Surya Sen, which carried out the Chittagong armoury raid in 1930. Later, he joined the Indian National Congress. After Indian independence, he worked as an administrative officer in the Calcutta Corporation till his death.

== Early life and independence movement ==
Lokenath Bal was born in Dhorla village of Chittagong District in Bengal Province of British India. His father's name was Prankrishna Bal. On 18 April 1930, a group of revolutionaries led by him took over the AFI armoury. Later, on 22 April 1930, he led another gunfight against the combined forces of the British army and the British police. His younger brother Harigopal Bal (Tegra) and another 11 revolutionaries died in this gunfight. He was able to escape and reach Chandernagore, a French territory. He and Ganesh Ghosh were arrested on 1 September 1930 after a gunfight with the British police. Jiban Ghoshal, alias Makhan, his young associate died in this gunfight. He was sentenced to transportation for life on 1 March 1932 and sent to the Cellular Jail in Port Blair. After his release in 1946, he joined the Radical Democratic Party founded by Manabendra Nath Roy. Later, he joined the Indian National Congress.

== Post independence ==
Bal was the second deputy commissioner of the Calcutta Corporation from 1 May 1952 to 19 July 1962. He was promoted to its first deputy commissioner on 20 July 1962 and remained in office till his death in Calcutta on 4 September 1964. His son, Himadri Bal, did his MBBS in Kolkata and joined the Indian Army. He became a renowned gynaecologist of the Indian Armed Forces and was posted to several teaching hospitals in the Armed Forces Medical Services, including the prestigious Armed Forces Medical College Pune. He retired as a colonel form the Army in 2015 and is teaching at a local medical college in Pune as a professor in obstetrics and gynaecology.
