= Narayan Sen =

Narayan Sen (1912–1956) was a Bengali revolutionary in the Indian independence movement. He was born in British India, present-day Bangladesh. His father's name was Sureshcharan Sen.

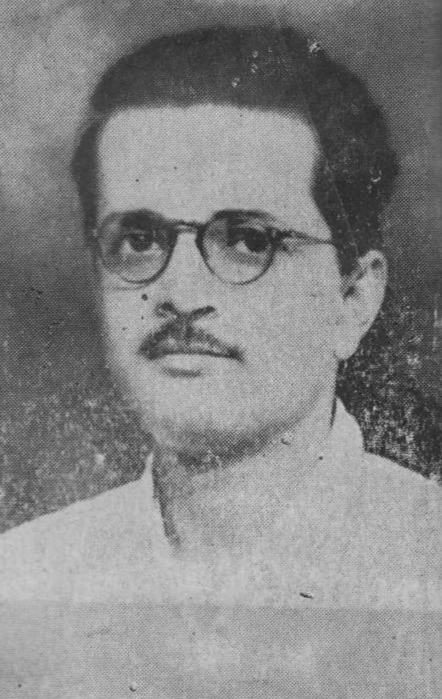
Freedom fighter Narayan Sen

== Education ==
Narayan Sen was born in Bogra district of Bangladesh on 1912. After passing his matriculation exam he came to his maternal grandparents house at Chittagong. Then Chittagong was the center point of the revolutionary activities of Masterda Surya Sen. Narayan Sen joined with the revolutionary team.

== Revolutionary activities ==
Surya Sen led a group of revolutionaries on 18 April 1930 to raid the police and auxiliary forces armouries in Chittagong. Narayan Sen took part in the attack. The plan was elaborate and included seizing of arms from the armouries as well as destruction of communication system of the city (including telephone, telegraph and railway), thereby isolating Chittagong from the rest of British India. Although the group looted weapons, they failed to get ammunition. They hoisted the Indian National Flag on the premises of the armoury, and then escaped. A few days later, a large fraction of the revolutionary group was cornered on Jalalabad Hill by British troops. In the ensuing fight, twelve revolutionaries died, many were arrested, while some managed to flee, including Narayan Sen. Police then declared 500 taka for Narayan Sen but failed to capture him.

== Death ==
For eighteen years Sen lived here and there with different looks and different names, Then he returned to Kolkata and lived by the fake name Onath Roy. Nobody knew his real name. He disclosed his real identity on 12 January 1948, the death anniversary of Surya Sen. He died on 8 September 1956.
