= Debaprasad =

Debaprasad (দেবপ্রসাদ) is a Bengali male name. The following is a list of people having this name:

- Debaprasad Chakraborty, Bengali lyricist
- Debaprasad Ghosh, Bengali mathematician
- Deba Prasad Gupta, Bengali revolutionary
- Deba Prasad Das, Indian classical dancer
- Deva Prasad Sarbadhikari, Indian lawyer, educationist and a vice chancellor of Calcutta University
- Deba Prasad Mitra, Bengali educationist
