= Deba Gupta =

Indian Bengali revolutionary

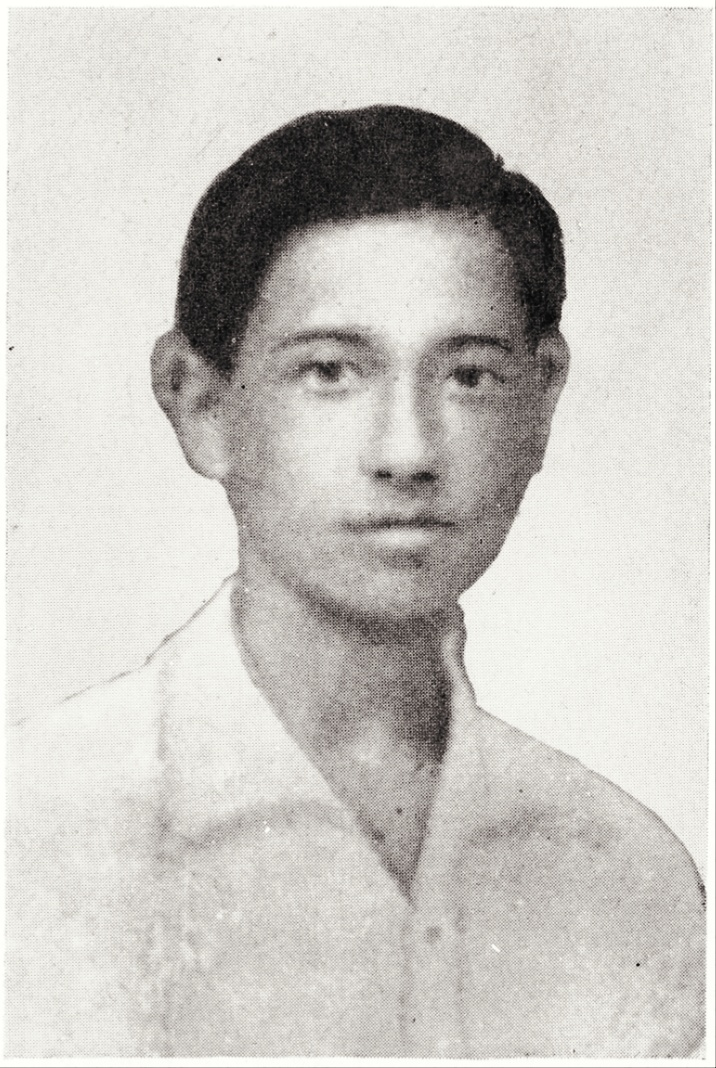
Debaprasad Gupta

Deba Gupta (December 1911 – 6 May 1930) alias Deba Prasad Gupta was a Bengali revolutionary and the elder brother of Ananda Prasad Gupta who joined in the Chittagong armoury raid. He died in a Kalarpole encounter with the British police on 6 May 1930.

== Revolutionary activities ==
Deba Gupta was born in December 1911 in Dhaka, British India, his father's name was Jogendranath Gupta (Mona). He came into contact with Masterda Surya Sen and his revolutionary group while studying in college. He took part in the Chittagong Uprising led by the Indian Republican Army. Gupta took part in the Armoury raid on 18 April 1930 and an armed encounter in Jalalabad hill on 22 April 1930. After the encounter he, along with his friends, retired to the village with great difficulty after successfully evading police and military surveillance.

== Death ==
The Indian Imperial Police chased and finally surrounded them on 6 May 1930. Gupta and his three comrades took shelter in a village beside Karnafuli River. They tried to escape and entered a bamboo grove in Kalarpole, Chittagong District. While police arrived, there was a sharp exchange of fire. Gupta, Rajat Sen and Monoranjan Sen died. The fourth Swadeshranjan Ray died in police custody next day.
