= Binod Bihari Chowdhury =

Veteran member of the civil society of Bangladesh

Biplobi Binod Bihari Chowdhury
- Born: 10 January 1911; Boalkhali, Chittagong District, Bengal Presidency, British India
- Died: 10 April 2013 (aged 102); Kolkata, West Bengal, India
- Resting place: Chittagong, Bangladesh
- Education: Bachelor of Arts; Master of Arts; Bachelor of Law
- Known for: Last surviving veteran of the Chittagong armoury raid
- Title: Biplobi (Revolutionary), Agnipurush
- Movement: Indian independence movement
- Spouse: Biva Das
- Awards: Independence Day Award

Binod Bihari Chowdhury (Bengali: বিনোদ বিহারী চৌধুরী; 10 January 1911 – 10 April 2013) was a Bangladeshi social worker and anti-colonial revolutionary. An influential member in the Indian independence movement and veteran of the civil society of Bangladesh, he is mostly known for his participation in the Chittagong armoury raid, an armed uprising led by Surya Sen to uproot the British colonial rule in India in 1930.

Born in 1911, in Chittagong, Binod Bihari was the last surviving veteran of the Chittagong armoury raid and was active in many significant events in the history of Bangladesh. In 2000, he received the Independence Day Award, the highest civilian award in Bangladesh.

== Early life and education ==
Binod Bihari Chowdhury was born in the village in a Mahishya family to Uttarvurshi under the Boalkhali Upazila in Chittagong district which was then a part of the East Bengal and Assam province of British India. He was the fifth child of his parents, Kamini Kumar Chowdhury and Roma Rani Chowdhury. His father, Kamini Kumar Chowdhury was a lawyer in Chittagong.

Binod Bihari started his primary education from the Rangamatia Board School in Fatikchhari Upazila.He was the student of Fatikchari's most famous & old school name Fatickchari Coronation Model High School. He was granted a scholarship for his outstanding performance in the matriculation examinations in 1929 from Saroatoli High School. He received the degrees of Bachelor of Arts, Master of Arts and Bachelor of Law in 1934, 1936 and 1939 respectively while serving as a prisoner at the Duly Detention Camp. He was married to Biva Das.

== Chittagong armoury raid ==
In 1927, Binod Bihari joined the anti-British revolutionary group Jugantar. Soon he came into contact with Surya Sen. At that time Surya Sen was planning an armed uprising against the British Raj in Chittagong. The plan was to capture the two main armouries in Chittagong, destroy the telegraph and telephone systems, disrupt rail lines to cut Chittagong off from rest of British India, and blow up the "European Club", where Britons socialised.

The intrigue was finally executed at 10 p.m. on 18 April 1930. Chittagong was liberated from British India for four days. However, the British Raj then mobilised a large body of troops in and around Chittagong. Binod Bihari along with some co-revolutionaries was taking shelter at the Jalalabad hills. On 22 April, they came under an austere attack from the British troops. Twelve revolutionaries and over eighty troops were killed in the battle. Binod Bihari was wounded at his neck in that battle. The revolutionaries came under a trial between January and March 1932. Binod Bihari was deported to the Duly Detention Camp in Rajputana.

== Political career ==
Binod Bihari was appointed as an Assistant General Secretary of the Chittagong district committee of Indian National Congress in 1939. He was also a member of the executive committee of Bengal Provincial Congress from 1940 to 1946. Binod Bihari was elected as the General Secretary of the Chittagong Branch of Indian National Congress in 1946.

After the partition of India in 1947, Chittagong became a part of East Pakistan. Many of his co-revolutionaries moved to India but Binod Bihari chose to stay in his hometown. In 1947, he was elected as a member of the East Pakistan Provincial Assembly. He retired from all kinds of political activity following the imposition of martial law by Ayub Khan.

== After independence of Bangladesh ==
Binod Bihari never joined politics again, but he was quite active in the democratic, cultural and social movements in Bangladesh.

In 2010, a three-day birth centenary program was held in Chittagong in the occasion of the hundredth birth anniversary of Binod Bihari from 8 to 10 April. The program was attended by several members of the civil society of Bangladesh including the Nobel laureate Prof. Muhammad Yunus. A memoir of Binod Bihari was also published titled Ognijhora Dingulo.

== Death ==
Binod Bihari was suffering from old age complications. His health began to deteriorate in the early April 2013. He was taken to Fortis Hospital in Kolkata where he died on 10 April the same year. His death occurred only a week before the 83rd anniversary of the raid, and he was its last survivor. His body was brought back to Bangladesh a day later.

Binod Bihari was paid tribute by people from all walks of life including the President and Prime Minister of Bangladesh. He was given state honour by the Government of Bangladesh. Binod Bihari's last rituals were performed at the Abhoy Mitra cremation center in Chittagong.

== Awards ==
- Independence Day Award – 2000
- Janakantha Gunijan Sammanona – 1999
- Bhorer Kagoj Sammanona – 1998
- Shaheed Notun Chandra Smrity Padak
