= Harigopal Bal =

Indian revolutionary

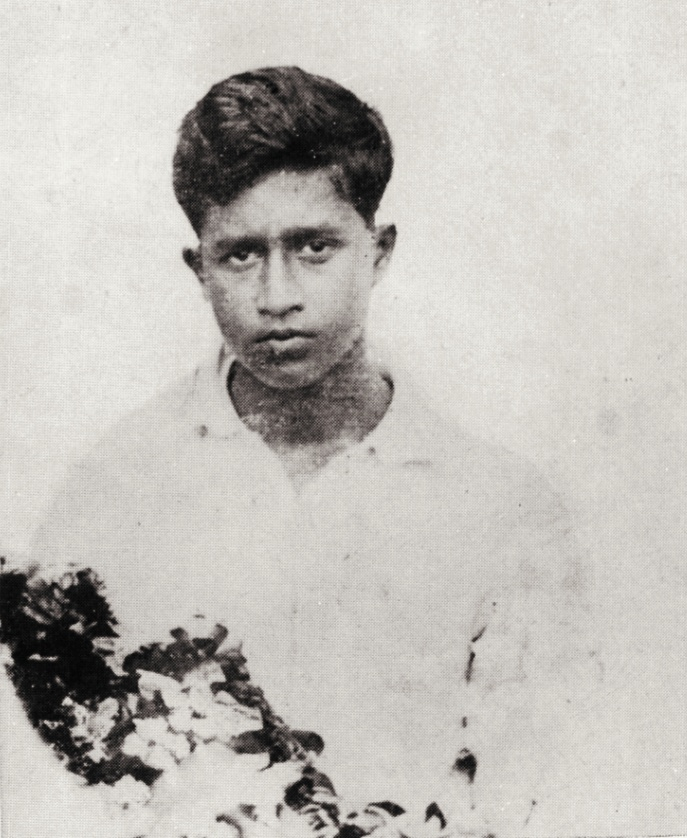
- Harigopal Bal (Tegra)
- Born: 1915; Kanungopara village, Chittagong, Bengal (now in Bangladesh)
- Died: 22 April 1930 (aged 14–15)

Harigopal Bal or Baul (Bengali: হরিগোপাল বল) popularly called as Tegra (1915 – 22 April 1930) was a Bengali revolutionary who took part in revolutionary activities against British rule in India.

Bal was born in 1915, at the village Kanungopara in Chittagong, Bengal (now in Bangladesh). His father was Pran Krishna Bal. Harigopal Bal joined the revolutionaries and took part in the Chittagong Armoury Raid on 18 April 1930 with his elder brother Lokenath Bal. After the abortive raid, Bal escaped. Four days later, he was injured after being shot while fighting against British troops on Jalalabad Hill, near Chittagong. He died on 22 April 1930.His last words were "Shona bhai, chollam. Tomra larai chaliye jao." which means "Good bye, dear brother. Let our struggle continue".

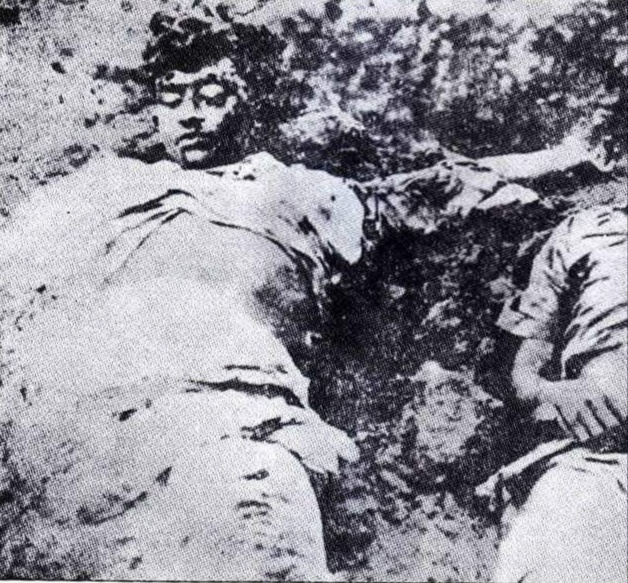
Dead body of Harigopal Bal (Tegra)

== Film adaptations ==
A film Chittagong released in October 2012, directed by Dr. Bedabrata Pain, shows role of Harigopal Bal (called by his nickname "Tegra" in the movie) in the Chittagong Armoury raid. Manoj Bajpai was the lead actor and played the role of Surya Sen.

Actor Nitin Prabhat played the Harigopal Bal with nickname 'Tegra' in the Bollywood movie Khelein Hum Jee Jaan Sey released in 2010.
