= Jiban Ghoshal =

Indian independence activist

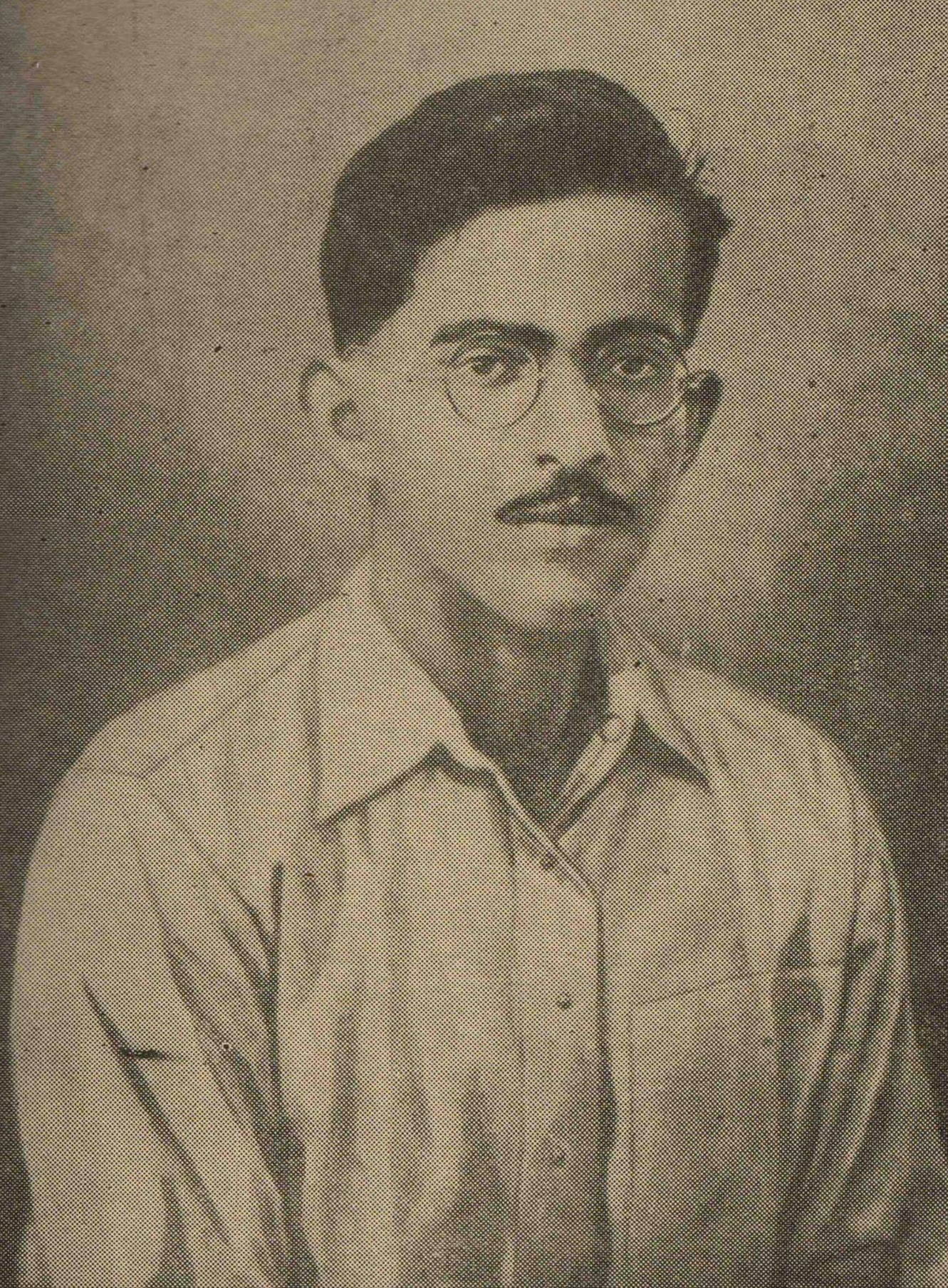
Jibon Ghosal

Jiban Ghoshal alias Makhanlal (26 June 1912 — 1 September 1930) was an Indian independence activist and a member of the armed resistance movement led by Masterda Surya Sen, which carried out the Chittagong armoury raid in 1930.

== Revolutionary activities ==
Ghoshal was born in a Bengali Brahmin family in Sadarghat, Chittagong of Bengal Province in British India to Yashodaranjan, was born in a rich family of Sadarghat . He was popularly known as Makhanlal. He joined in the freedom movement in student life. He joined the Chittagong revolutionary group as a student in the early years; when its leaders were busy collecting money for the purchase of arms by various means. Jiban withdrew sixteen hundred rupees from the bank account of his father by forging his signature. Ghoshal took active part in the police armoury raid at Chattagram.

== The Feni skirmish ==
Many revolutionaries were injured or killed during the Battle of Jalalabad Hills, with some succumbing to their injuries in hospital. Amarendra Nandi of Sadarghat reportedly committed suicide after police launched a crackdown to arrest him, and Ambika Chakraborty sustained serious injuries. Despite these losses and injuries, still the key leaders such as Surya Sen, Nirmal Sen, Ananta Singh, Lokenath Bal, and Ganesh Ghosh remained at large.

After the Chittagong police seized the armory, the revolutionaries captured a large number of weapons before setting the armory on fire. Unfortunately, Himangshu Sen was caught in the blaze. He was taken to a safe location for treatment by Ananta Singh, Ganesh Ghosh, Ananda Gupta, and Jiban Ghoshal. Upon their return, they found no sign of the main rebel group at the police lines, as the group had already taken shelter on a nearby hill. Consequently, they returned to town and went into hiding. Both sides attempted communication over the following days, but these efforts were unsuccessful.

On the night of April 22, around 9:30 p.m., these four rebels boarded a Kolkata-bound train at Bhatia Railway Station, deceiving local farmers. Stationmaster Ashwini Ghosh grew suspicious of the group and, hoping for promotion, informed police at upcoming stations of his suspicions and shared their ticket details.

The train stopped at Feni station in the early morning hours, where a large police force surrounded the group. After verifying their tickets, the four were taken to the stationmaster's office. Shortly after, Ganesh Ghosh exited the room citing natural causes while under guard. Meanwhile, the remaining rebels were searched. During the frisking of Jiban Ghoshal, Ananta Singh fired his revolver, followed by gunfire from Jiban Ghoshal and Anand Gupta. Ganesh Ghosh also joined in the attack.

The sudden outbreak of gunfire surprised everyone present, allowing the four rebels to escape under the cover of darkness. In the darkness, the rebels became separated. After some time, Jiban Ghoshal and Anand Gupta reunited near the railway line. Leaving the tracks, they proceeded along a main road and soon encountered Ganesh Ghosh resting beneath a banyan tree by the roadside. The three then continued their journey together. Avoiding armed police and wary locals, they endured a difficult trek before finally reaching Kolkata, where they took refuge at the home of Bhupendra Kumar Datta, a prominent leader of the Jugantar party.

Meanwhile, Ananta Singh, disguised as a dark-skinned, mute, and mentally unstable person, traveled across numerous villages, fields, hills, and forests to reach Comilla. There, he found shelter with notable leaders including Kaminikumar Dutta, Basant Kumar Majumdar, Moulvi Makhleswar Rahman (Secretary of the Comilla District Congress), and Moulvi Eradullah. After a few days, with their assistance, he traveled to Kolkata and established contact with Bhupendra Kumar Datta.

Bhupendra Kumar Datta arranged safe shelters for the Chittagong revolutionaries in areas such as Ultadanga and Kidderpore in Kolkata. Later, with the cooperation of Basanta Kumar Bandyopadhyay, a leading Jugantar figure in French-occupied Chandannagar, they established a refuge there and facilitated the transfer of revolutionaries from Chittagong to this safe haven.

After the operation he fled from Chittagong towards Calcutta with another young revolutionary Ananda Gupta. Two senior member of the group, Ganesh Ghosh and Ananta Singh accompanied them in their journey. Police challenged the team in Feni railway station but finally Ghoshal and other succeed to escape after a short encounter. He took Shelter in Calcutta, Mirzapur street and Chandannagar, Hooghly district.

=== Death ===
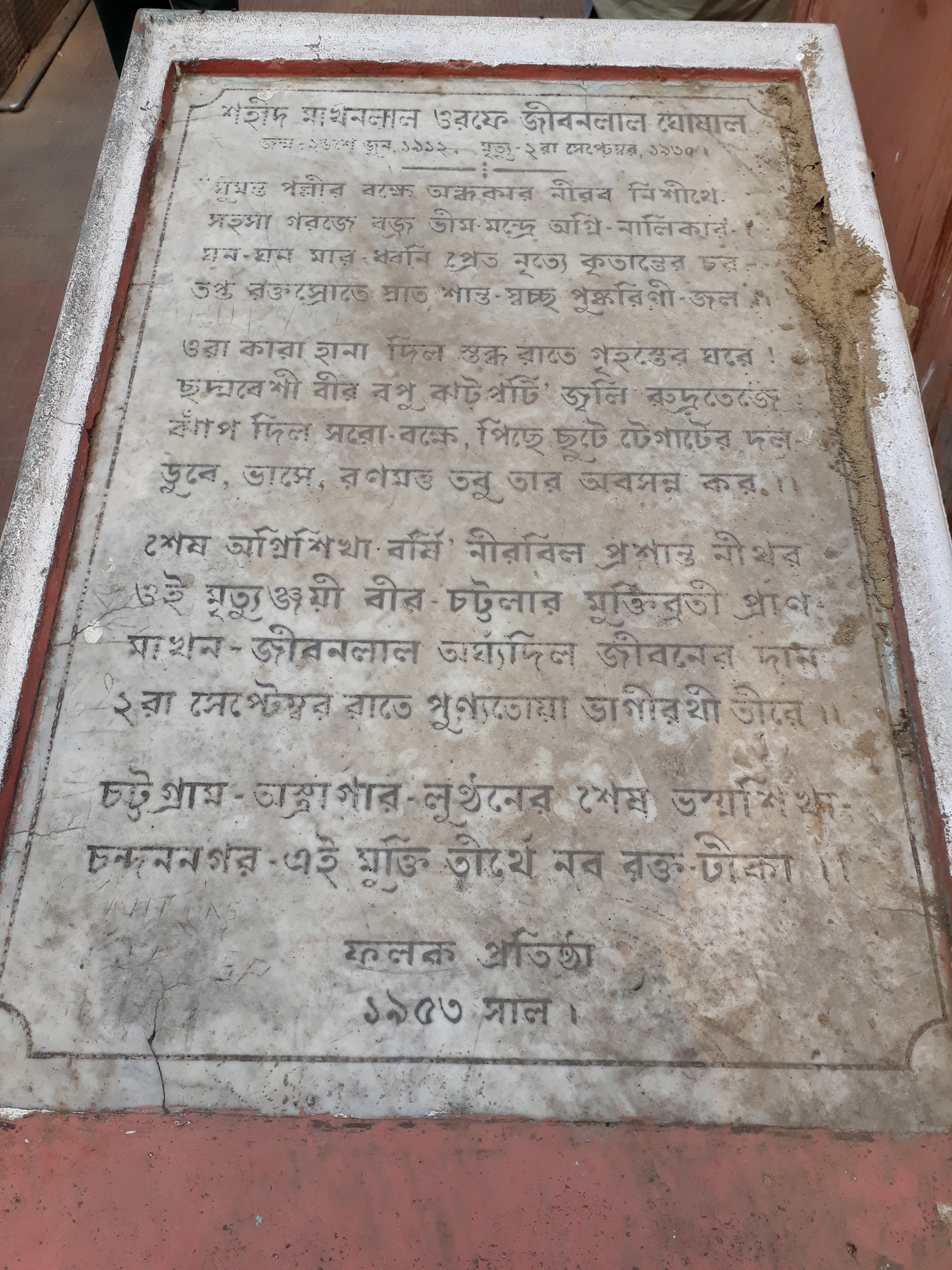
Plaque in Chandannagar Burning ghat

On the day of the Chittagong Upsurge (18 April 1930), he was in Loknath Bal's team to raid the Chittagong Auxiliary Forces Armory, which they occupied without much opposition; but on the way, their fellow, Himangshu, got serious burn injuries. Surya Sen directed Ananta Singha, and Ganesh Ghosh along with Anandaprasad Gupta and Jiban Lal to drop Himangshu to safety in a car. The four thus strayed away from the main group.

Four days later in the dead of night, Jiban and the three others overpowered the police at Feni Railway Station and managed to escape to Calcutta and from there to their hideout in Chandannagore. A few days later, Loknath Ball also joined them.

On 1 September 1930, their shelter was raided by Police commissioner Charles Tegart at the head of a large force. In an attempt to break the police cordon through the backyard of the house, Jiban Lal was shot by the police. Charu Chandra Roy, then the mayor of Chandannagar, led the procession for Makhanlal's funeral. Despite police opposition, he asserted his authority and proceeded to the Borai chandi tola crematorium.

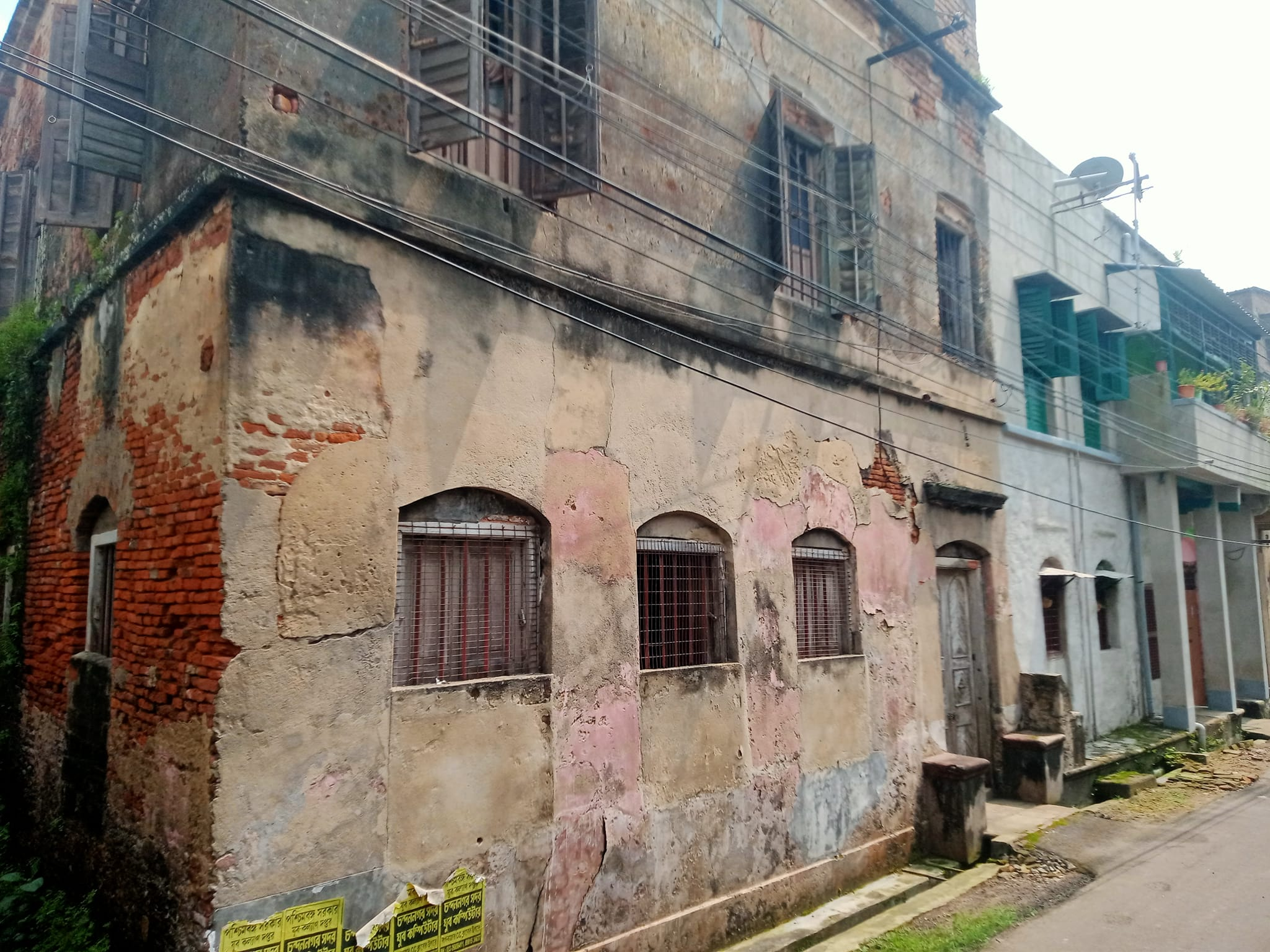
The house where on 1st September 1930, Jibon Ghosal alias Makhan was shot dead and Loknath Bal, Ganesh ghosh and Ananda Gupta were arrested.

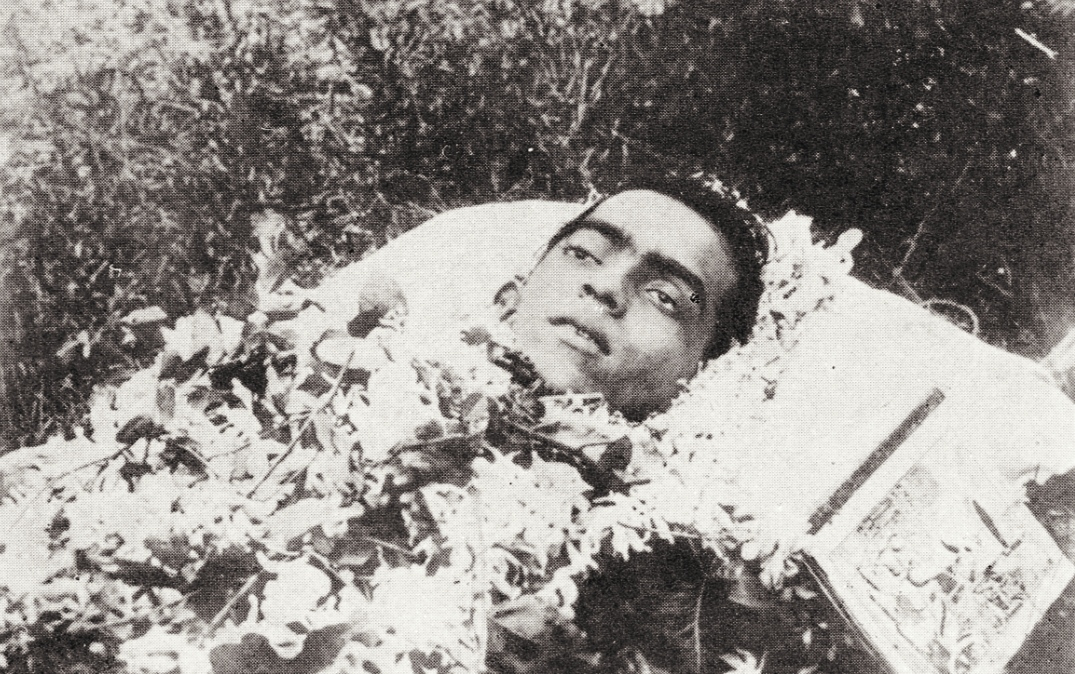
fighter Jibon Ghosal dead body funeral in Chandannagar

== Popular culture ==
The role of Jiban Ghoshal was portrayed by Smith Seth in popular Bollywood movie Khelein Hum Jee Jaan Sey in 2010.
