= Surya Sen Park =

Indian park

The Surya Sen Park is a park in Mahakal Pally, Siliguri, West Bengal, India.

It contains a bust of freedom fighter Surya Sen, a children's park and an exhibition on alternative energy in West Bengal (maintained by WBREDA). Well-known Bengali songs can be heard from everywhere, and in the evenings fountains are working and the whole park is lit. The park also has a pool for rafting.

NJP is the major nearby railway station, and Bagdogra is the nearest airport.
