= Revolutionary Communist Council of India =

Indian political party

The Revolutionary Communist Council of India was an armed political faction in India founded in 1962 by Ananta Singh which followed Marxism-Leninism-Mao Zedong Thought. The party was also called as Man Money Gun (MMG) Group. In May 1970 state authorities claimed to have arrested some 60 militants of the group in the Jaduguda forest, alleging that the group had attacked a police station in the Ruam region near Jamshedpur. The Indian press noted that among the arrested was a 26-year old British woman, Mary Tyler. The case became known as the Jaguguda Naxalite Conspiracy Case.
