= Ananta Singh =

Indian revolutionary (1903–1979)

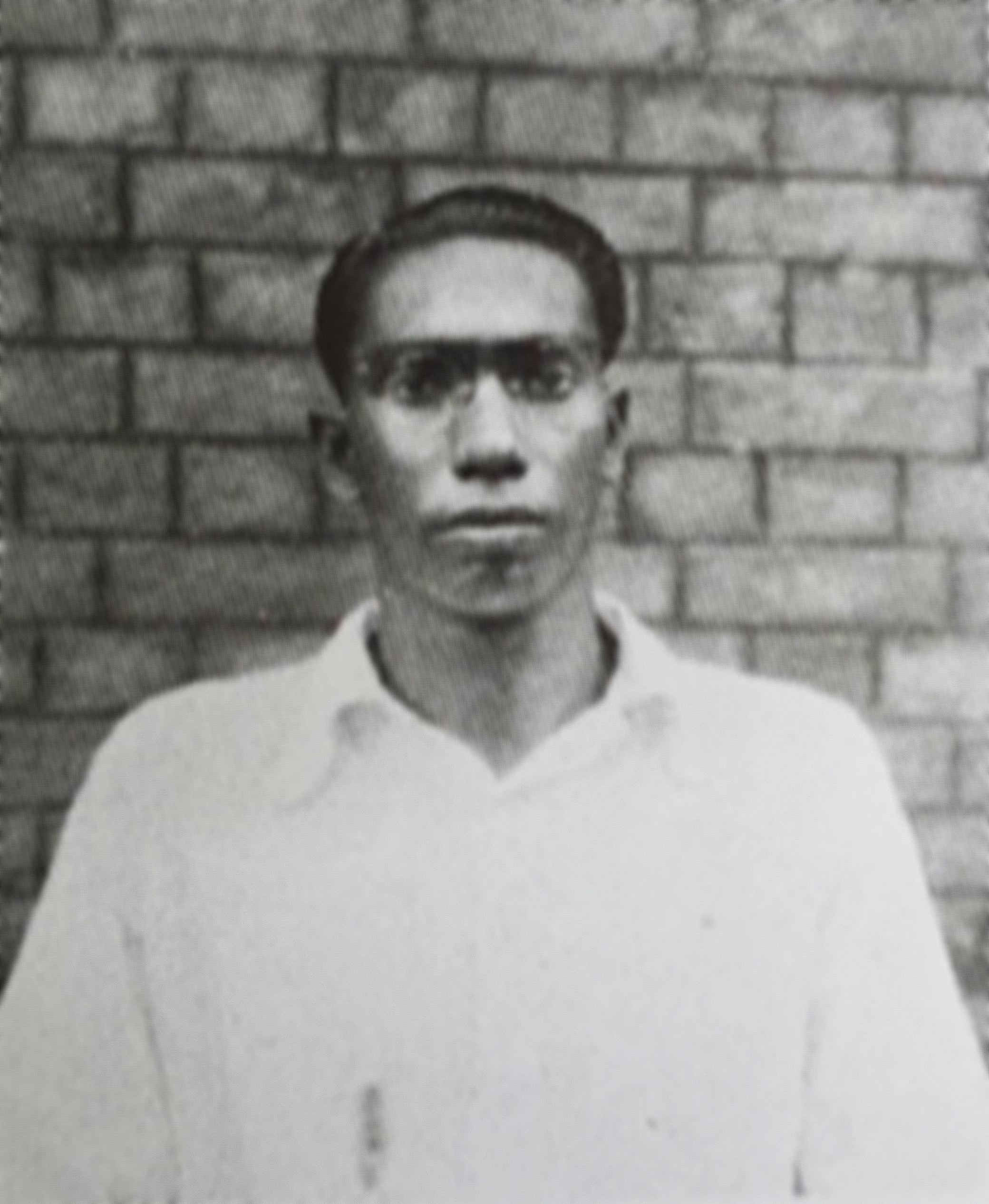
- Born: 1 December 1903; Chittagong, Bengal, British India
- Died: 25 January 1979 (aged 75); Calcutta, West Bengal, India
- Occupation: Independence Activist
- Writing career
- Notable work: Chittagong Armoury Raid

Ananta Lal Singho (1 December 1903 - 25 January 1979) was an Indian revolutionary, who participated in the Chittagong armoury raid in 1930. Later, he founded a far-left radical communist group, the Revolutionary Communist Council of India.

The role of Singh was played by actor Maninder Singh in the 2010 Hindi film Khelein Hum Jee Jaan Sey, Jaideep Ahlawat in the 2012 film Chittagong and Jeet in the 2026 film Keu Bole Biplobi Keu Bole Dakat.

== Introduction ==
Ananta Singh was born on 1 December 1903 at Chittagong. His father's name was Golap (Gulaab) Singh. Singh's grandparents were Punjabi-speaking Rajputs who migrated from Agra and settled in Chittagong. He met Surya Sen while he was studying in the Chittagong Municipal School and became his follower. Indumati Singh was his sister who is also a notable freedom fighter.

== Revolutionary movement ==
Singh's involvement in the Indian nationalist movement began with the Non-cooperation movement in 1921. Although, he motivated his schoolmates to join the movement, he personally did not have much faith in the movement. On 14 December 1923, he and Nirmal Sen led the robbery at the treasury office of the Assam Bengal Railway according to the plan made by Surya Sen and clashed with the police after the robbery on 24 December. He fled from the scene after the robbery and reached Calcutta after a short stay at Sandwip. He was arrested in Calcutta but released soon. He was again arrested in 1924 and imprisoned for four years.

After his release, he founded a gymnasium and recruited many youths for the revolutionary movement led by Surya Sen. On 18 April 1930, he was one of the leaders of the Chittagong armoury raid. After the incident, he was able to flee from Chittagong with Ganesh Ghosh and Jiban Ghoshal. After a short encounter with police in Feni railway station, he took shelter to French territory Chandernagore. But, hearing the news of the torture faced by his fellow revolutionaries who were already in jail, he surrendered to the police on 28 June 1930 in Calcutta and faced the trial. In the trial, he was sentenced to transportation for life and sent to the Cellular Jail in Port Blair. After, a long hunger strike in the Cellular Jail in 1932, he was brought back to a mainland jail along with a number of his fellow political prisoners due to an initiative undertaken by Mahatma Gandhi and Rabindranath Tagore. After his final release in 1946, he joined the Communist Party of India.

== Post-1947 period ==
After the Indian 'independence' in 1947, Singh was mostly involved in the film production and dealership of the motor vehicles. In the late 60s, he founded a new far left political group, Man-Money-Gun (MMG) later renamed the Revolutionary Communist Council of India in Calcutta. The members of this group conducted a number of bank robberies in Calcutta in order to raise funds for buying arms and ammunitions. This period of his life is very controversial. In the late 1960s there were regular robberies in various banks in Calcutta where, Ananta Singh's name featured. There were series of writings in local papers and the Bhadralok who in those days was still remembering and revering the revolutionary nationalists were quite upset to learn about his deeds. Finally, along with most of the members of the group, he was arrested from their hideout in a forest near Jaduguda in the present-day Jharkhand state in 1969. He was imprisoned till 1977. He was suffering from cardiac problems during his imprisonment and died within a short period of time after his release.

== Works ==
Singh's most significant work is his controversial autobiography, Keu Bole Biplobi, Keu Bole Dakat (Some Call Me a Robber, Some Call Me a Revolutionary). His other significant works include: Chattagram Yubabidroha (Youth Revolution in Chittagong) (in two volumes), Agnigarbha Chattagram (Chittagong on Fire), Masterda on Surya Sen, Surya Sener Svapna O Sadhana (Dream and Austerities of Surya Sen) and Ami Sei Meye (I am that Girl). Between 1960 and 1966, he even produced three Bengali films including the hit Jamalaye Jibanta Manush.

== In popular media ==
- Indian film director Ashutosh Gowariker made the film Khelein Hum Jee Jaan Sey (2010) about Surya Sen's life. Actor Maninder Singh played the role of Ananta Singh in the film.
- The National Award-winning Hindi film Chittagong, which was based on the Chittagong armoury raid, had Jaideep Ahlawat portraying Singh.
- In 2026, the Bengali filmmaker Pathikrit Basu directed Singh's biopic Keu Bole Biplobi Keu Bole Dakat, starring Jeet in the lead. Eponymous with his autobiography, the film showcased upon his participation in the Chittagong armoury raid against the British colonial rule in the 1930s, to a radical justice seeker and successful film producer in the 1960s.
