= Tarakeswar Dastidar =

Indian freedom fighter (1909–1934)

Tarakeshwar Dastidar
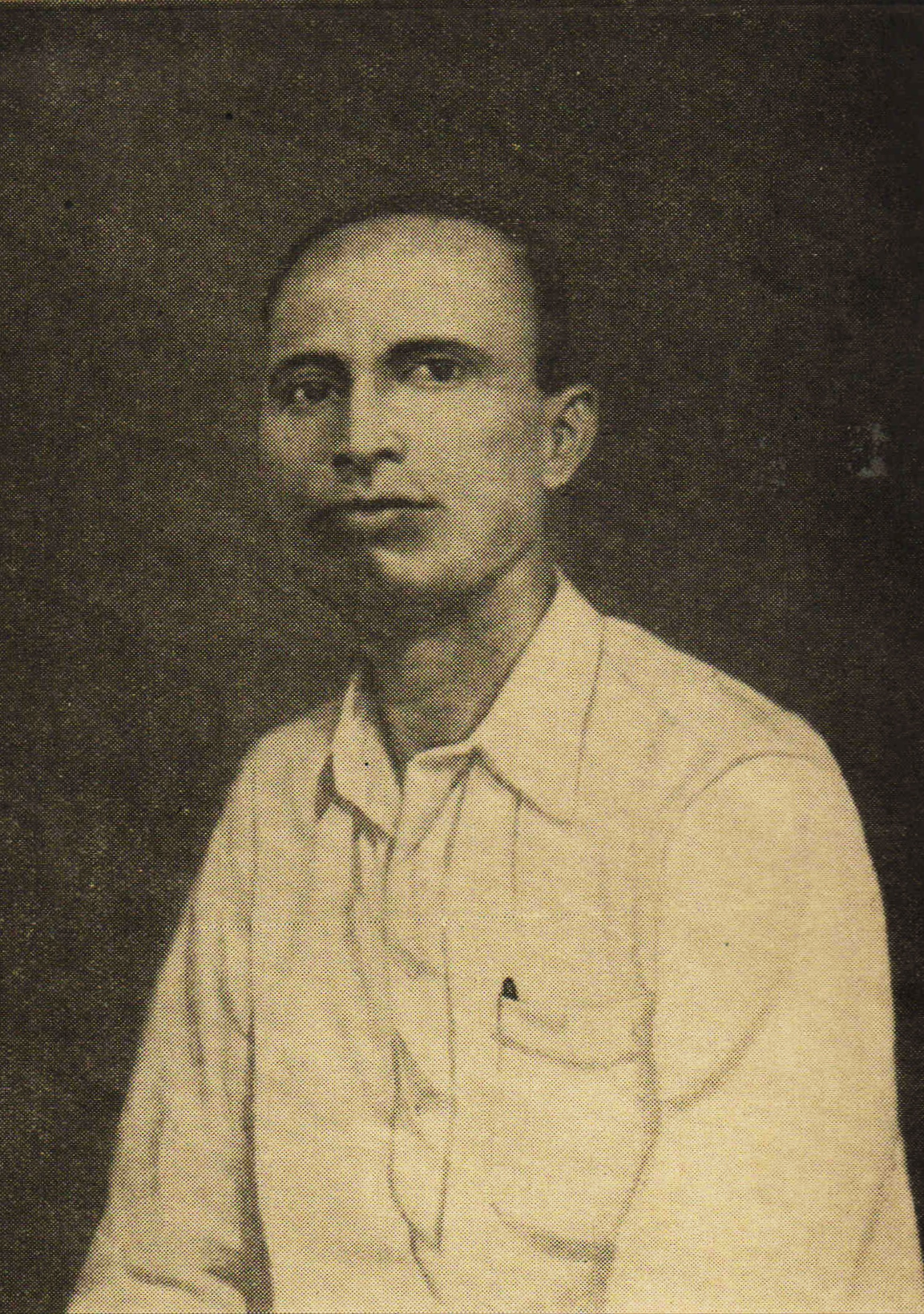
- Born: 1909; Chittagong, Bengal Presidency, British India
- Died: 12 January 1934 (aged 24–25); Chittagong, Bengal Presidency, British India
- Cause of death: Execution by hanging
- Occupation: Revolutionary
- Known for: Role in Indian freedom struggle

Tarakeswar Dastidar (1909 – 12 January 1934) was an Indian independence activist. He participated in the Chittagong armoury raid, along with Surya Sen and others on 18 April 1930.

== Revolutionary activities ==
Dastidar was born in a Baidya family in Saroatali, Chittagong, in British India. While studying at Saroatali school he joined in the Indian Republican Army, a revolutionary group led by Masterda Surya Sen. In 1930, he was seriously injured by a blast while manufacturing of bombs. Dastidar was one of the leader of this underground group. On 18 April 1930, he guided a group of youth revolutionaries to raid the police armoury of Chittagong. After the arrest of Masterda, he took charge and directed the movement. Dastidar was arrested on 19 May 1933 after an armed encounter with police force at Gahira village in the house of Purna Talukdar.

== Death ==
After the trial, he was sentenced to death on 14 August 1933. After severe inhumane torture and beatings by the police, Dastidar was hanged along with Surya Sen in Chittagong jail on 12 January 1934.
