= Chittagong armoury raid =

1930 uprising in British India

- Part of the revolutionary movement for Indian independence
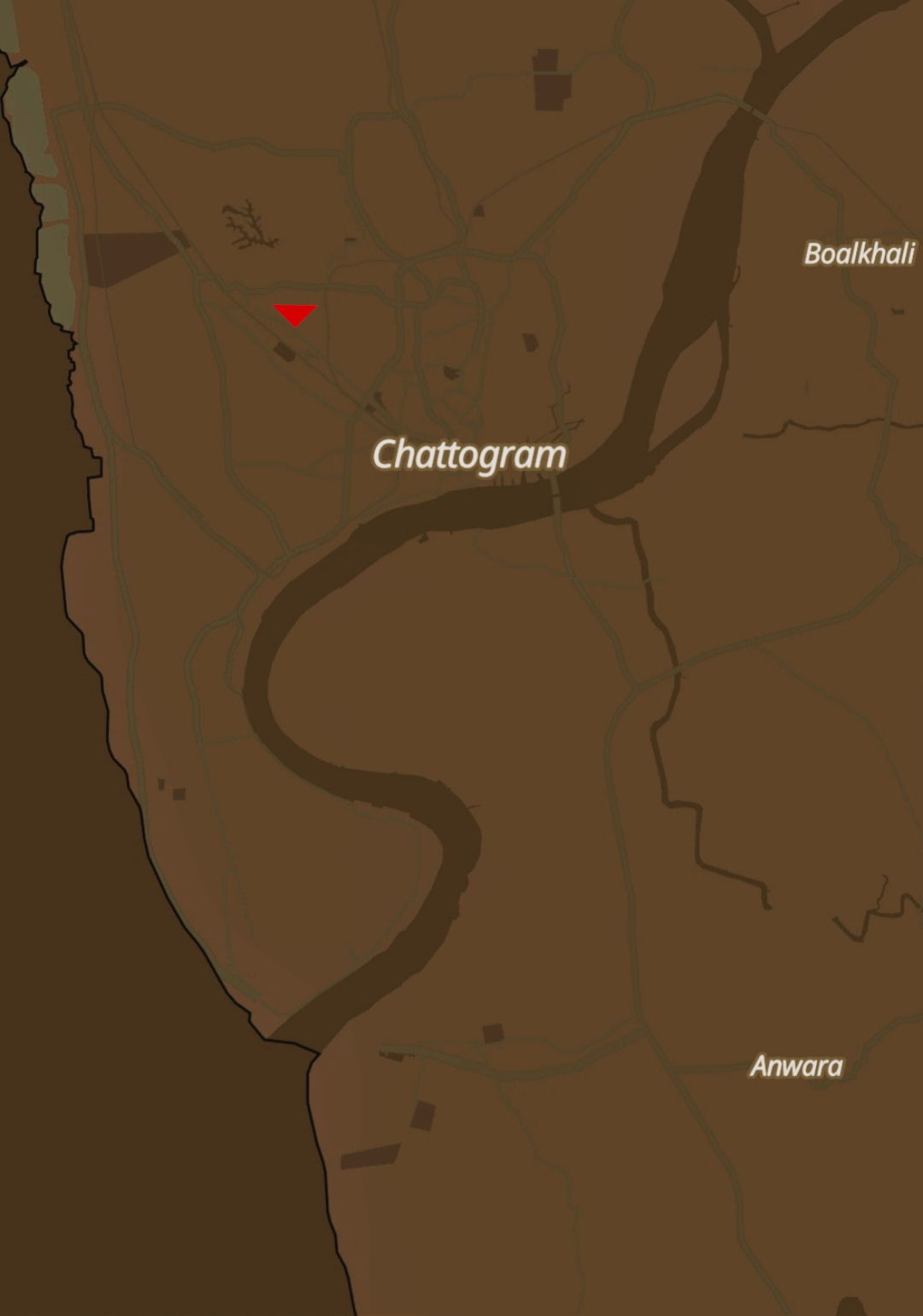
- Location of the armoury raid
Date	18 April 1930
Location	Chittagong, Bengal Presidency, British India
Result	Failure to locate ammunition; Success in cutting telephone and telegraph wires and disrupting train movements

Belligerents
Indian Republican Army	(British Raj) British India: Bengal Presidency

Commanders and leaders
Surya Sen (executed)	Stanley Jackson

Casualties and losses
12 killed	84–85 killed

The Chittagong Uprising termed by the British as Chittagong Armoury Raid, was an attempt on 18 April 1930 to raid the armoury of police and auxiliary forces from the Chittagong armoury of Bengal Province in British India (now in Bangladesh) by armed Indian independence fighters led by Surya Sen.

== Background ==
The raiders were members of revolutionary Indian Republican Army, who favoured armed uprisings as a means to achieve India's independence from British colonial rule. They were inspired by the 1916 Easter Rising in Ireland and led by Surya Sen. However, they were ideologically influenced more by the communists in the Soviet Union. Many of these raiders later became communists. The group included Ganesh Ghosh, Lokenath Bal, Ambika Chakrobarty, Harigopal Bal (Tegra), Ananta Singh, Narayan Sen, Anand Prasad Gupta, Tripura Sen, Bilash Dey, Bidhubhusan Bhattacharya, Pritilata Waddedar, Kalpana Dutta, Himangshu Sen, Binod Bihari Chowdhury, Nani Gopal Deb, Subodh Roy, Monoranjan Bhattacharya.

Sen devised a plan to capture the two main armouries in Chittagong, destroy the telegraph and telephone office, and take as hostages members of the European Club, while rail and communication lines were to be cut in order to sever Chittagong from Calcutta. Imperial banks at Chittagong were to be looted to gather money for further uprisings, and various jailed revolutionaries would be freed.

== Raid ==
The plan was put into action at 22:00 on 18 April 1930. The police armoury was captured by a group of revolutionaries led by Ganesh Ghosh, while another group of ten men led by Lokenath Bal took the Auxiliary Forces armoury. Some 65 people took part in the raid, undertaken in the name of Indian Republican Army, Chittagong Branch. They failed to locate ammunition but did succeed in cutting telephone and telegraph wires and disrupting train movements.

About 16 of the group captured the European club's headquarters (in Pahartali, now the Railway Office next to Shahjahan Field) but there were few club members present because of it being Good Friday. Upon learning of the situation, the Europeans were able to get the alarm out to troops, which the revolutionaries had not expected. After the raids, the revolutionaries gathered outside the police armoury, where Sen took a military salute, hoisted a national flag, and proclaimed a Provisional Revolutionary Government. The revolutionaries left Chittagong town before dawn and marched towards the Chittagong hill ranges, looking for a safe place to hide.

A few of the members – including Ganesh Ghosh, Ananta Singh and the teenagers Ananda Gupta and Jeebon Ghoshal – were elsewhere, and were almost captured at Feni railway station but managed to escape. Later they stayed in hiding in a house in Chandannagar.

== Aftermath ==
After a few days, the police traced some of the revolutionaries. They were surrounded by several thousand troops while they took shelter in Jalalabad hills near Chittagong Cantonment on the afternoon of 22 April 1930. Over 80 troops and 12 revolutionaries were killed in the ensuing gunfight in the Battle of Jalalabad Hills. Sen dispersed his men to neighbouring villages in small groups and thus some escaped. A few fled to Calcutta while some were arrested. An intense crackdown on the resistance ensued. Ananta Singh gave himself up in Calcutta coming away from his hiding place in Chandannagar, to be close to the young teenagers captured and under trial in Chittagong. A few months later, Police Commissioner Charles Tegart surrounded their hideout and, in the ensuing exchange of fire, Jiban Ghoshal was killed.

Some of the revolutionaries managed to reorganise. On 24 September 1932, Debi Prasad Gupta, Monoranjan Sen, Rajat Sen, Swadesh Roy, Phanindra Nandi and Subodh Chaudhary led by Pritilata Waddedar, attacked the Pahartali European Club, killing one woman and injuring several police officials. However, the plan was not entirely successful. The revolutionaries fled after the attack, but Pritilata, who got wounded, consumed cyanide to evade arrest and killed herself. The police searched the rest of the absconders. In Kalarpole encounter Deba Gupta, Monoranjan Sen, Rajat Sen and Swadeshranjan Ray were killed while the other two, Subodh and Phani, were wounded and arrested. During 1930–1932, 22 officials and 220 others were killed by revolutionaries in separate incidents. Debi Prasad Gupta's brother was sentenced to transportation for life.

=== The armoury raid trial ===
The mass trial of those arrested during and after the raids concluded in January 1932 and the judgement was delivered on 1 March 1932. The revolutionaries were defended by Barrister Sarat Chandra Bose, however later, due to certain financial constraints they could not afford the services of Sarat Chandra Bose, it was then that Barrister Birendranath Sasmal stepped in and refused to charge any legal fees from the revolutionaries. His courtroom actions proved to be quite effective as only twelve of the defendants were sentenced to deportation for life, two received three-year prison sentences and the remaining 32 individuals were acquitted. The twelve deported to Andaman included Ganesh Ghosh, Lokenath Bal, sixteen-year-old Ananda Gupta, and Ananta Singh.

=== Capture and death of Surya Sen ===
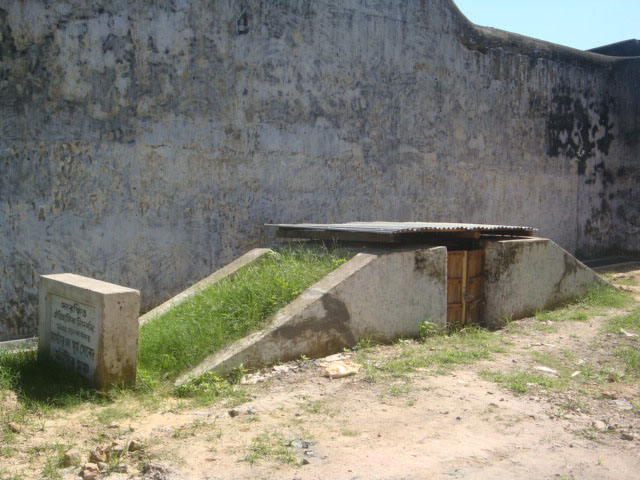
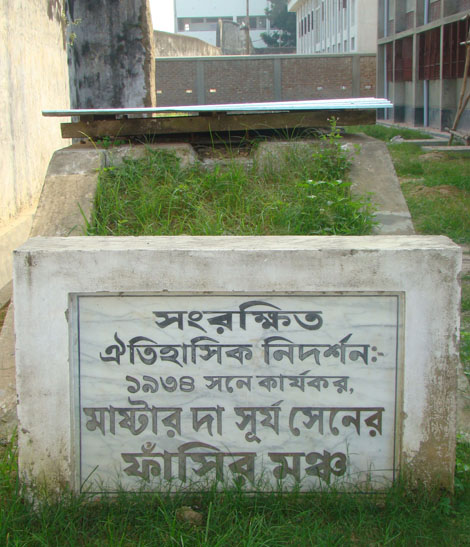
The gallows in Chittagong Central Jail, Bangladesh, where Sen was hanged. The Government of Bangladesh has designated it a historical monument.

The Chittagong revolutionary group suffered a fatal blow when Masterda Surya Sen was arrested on 16 February 1933 from Gairala village after a tip-off from an insider of the group. For the reward money, jealousy, or both, Netra Sen told the British Government that Surya Sen was at his house. But before Netra Sen was able to get his ₹10,000 reward, he was assassinated by the revolutionaries. Surya Sen was hanged by the British administration on 12 January 1934.

== Film adaptations ==
- A Bengali movie Chattogram Astragar Lunthan was made in 1949 on the Chittagong armoury raid in 1949. It was directed by Nirmal Chowdhury.
- A Hindi movie, Khelein Hum Jee Jaan Sey was made on the Chittagong armoury raid in 2010. It was directed by Ashutosh Gowarikar starring Abhishek Bachchan and supported by Deepika Padukone. It was based on the book Do and Die: The Chittagong Uprising 1930-34 by Manini Chatterjee.
- Another film, Chittagong was made in 2010 and released in October 2012. It was directed by Dr. Bedabrata Pain, a former scientist in NASA who resigned from NASA to make this film. Manoj Bajpai was the lead actor and played the role of Surya Sen.

== Sources ==
- Chandra, Bipan (1989). India's struggle for independence, 1857-1947 (Repr. ed.). New Delhi, India: Penguin Books. ISBN 9780140107814.
