= Monoranjan Sen =

Bengali revolutionary

Monoranjan Sen ( ? - May 5, 1930) was one of the martyred Bengali revolutionaries of the Indian independence movement in British India.

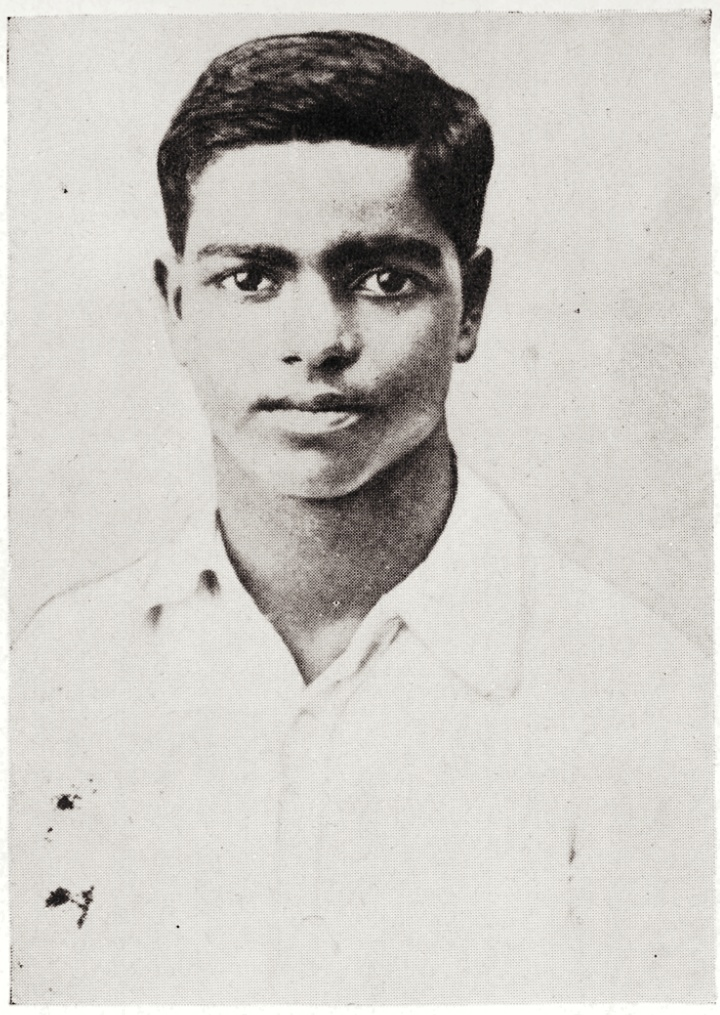
Manoranjan Sen

== Revolutionary activities ==
Manoranjan Sen was born in Chittagong. His father's name is Rajinikanth Sen. He was a child of a poor family. He joined the Indian Republican Army led by masterda Surya Sen while in his first year of college. As a member of the Revolutionary Party, he took part in the looting of Chittagong armoury on April 17, 1930. He was one of the victorious forces in the battle of Jalalabad hills which took place on 22 April. 4 days later he committed suicide, reject to surrender and to avoid police arrest, after his three friends were killed in a skirmish with the guards at Kalarpool during an attack on a European residence in Chittagong.
