= Laldighi, Chittagong =

Traditional area in Chittagong, Bangladesh

Coordinates: 22.3376°N 91.8379°E

Laldighi or Lal Dighi is an area located in Chittagong, Bangladesh. Its location is at the end of Jail Road in the city. Lal Dighi is spread over an area of 2.70 acres. On one side of it is Andarkilla. Around it are district council buildings and local bank branches. It belongs to Ward No. 32 of Chittagong City Corporation.

== History ==
In 1761, the British East India Company gained control of Chittagong. At that time Entekali Kachari i.e. Land Tehsil Office (now Metropolitan Police Office) was painted red. It was known as "Lalkuthi" by the people. To the east of this red gate was the jail. It was also painted red and hence came to be known as "Lalghar". These two buildings were guarded by British hillmen wearing red turbans. Many people think that this is why the buildings are named Lal Ghar and Lal Kuthi. There was a small pond next to the red house and the red hut. At the beginning of English rule in Chittagong, the pond was enlarged and turned into a lake. This Dighi is known as Lal Dighi because there were two red buildings next to it.

== Ownership ==
On the north side of Lal Dighi is a mosque with the year 1939 written on its dome. The name of Taqi Ismail Muhammad is written on it. He is a landlord. His native house was Badarkhali village of Chakaria upazila. He used to spend his free time on the banks of the then open Lal Dighi. He was the guardian of Lal Dighi. Later he handed over the ownership of the Dighi to the Government Muslim High School.

== Ricketts Ghat ==
On the west bank of Lal Dighi was "Ricketts Ghat". The ghat was built by the zamindars of Chittagong under the command of Sir Henry Ricketts who served as the Commissioner of Chittagong from 1941 to 1948. Harvey was Collector of Chittagong in 1831-1839. He started the survey work with 32 Deputy Collectors and a few Survey Amins. In the survey, he calculated Kani in 18 Gandas instead of 20 Gandas. Everyone was so upset with him that people attacked him in Anwara Thana. He then ordered the soldiers to fire. On receiving this news the authorities sent for Rickett. During the survey of 1200 Maghir, he benefited the people of Chittagong and became respected by all. After the death of Chittagong Sessions Judge Todel in the 19th century, his body was cremated on the north side of Ricketts Ghat. The pillar erected in his memory was later demolished.

== Maidan ==
The entire area from the foot of the Metropolitan Police Headquarters hill to the foot of Pari Hill in the west was then known as the Municipal Maidan. In 1887, the statue of Queen Victoria was installed in this Maidan. The statue was removed during the freedom movement in the 1940s. After the completion of the North-South road at the end of the 19th century, the Municipal Maidan was divided into two parts. The eastern side is converted into a public playground. When the Muslim High School was established, the ground became the playground of the Muslim High School. This field is now known as Laldighir Maidan.

In 1966, Sheikh Mujibur Rahman organized a public meeting at Lal Dighi maidan to highlight the importance of six points to the people of East Pakistan.

On January 24, 1988, 24 people were killed due to firing on the orders of the then Commissioner of Chittagong Metropolitan Police at Sheikh Hasina's public meeting held at Maidan. A case was filed against the commissioner 4 years after the incident and the verdict was delivered in 2020.

== Legend ==
There is a legend in the mouth of the people of Chittagong about the incident of Lal Dighi. Once a day laborer's daughter went down to bathe in that pond. Suddenly he was chained and taken to an underwater country. Actually, it was a king's court. That king's marriage was fixed with Lal Begum. One day the king wanted to see Lal Begum but it was reported that Lal Begum had run away from her home with a slave. The king did not know this news at that time. So Mazur's daughter was brought to act as Lal Begum with Badshah. In many contexts, the king gets to know the real identity of the girl. On the orders of the angry king, everyone started looking for the real Lal Begum. Then it was known that he was in the fort of the Portuguese two hundred cubits away from the lake of Andar Qilla. The king attacked that fort. The water of Dighi turned red with many murders. The king was defeated in that battle. Everyone ran away. Still, he stayed on the banks of the Dighi with the hope of rescuing Lal Begum.

== Events ==
On the 12th of Baishakh in 1910, Abdul Jabbar organized the first Bolikhela on the banks of Lal Dighi. Since then, every year on the 12th of Baisakh, Jobbarer Boli Khela is held on the banks of Lal Dighi.

== Gallery ==
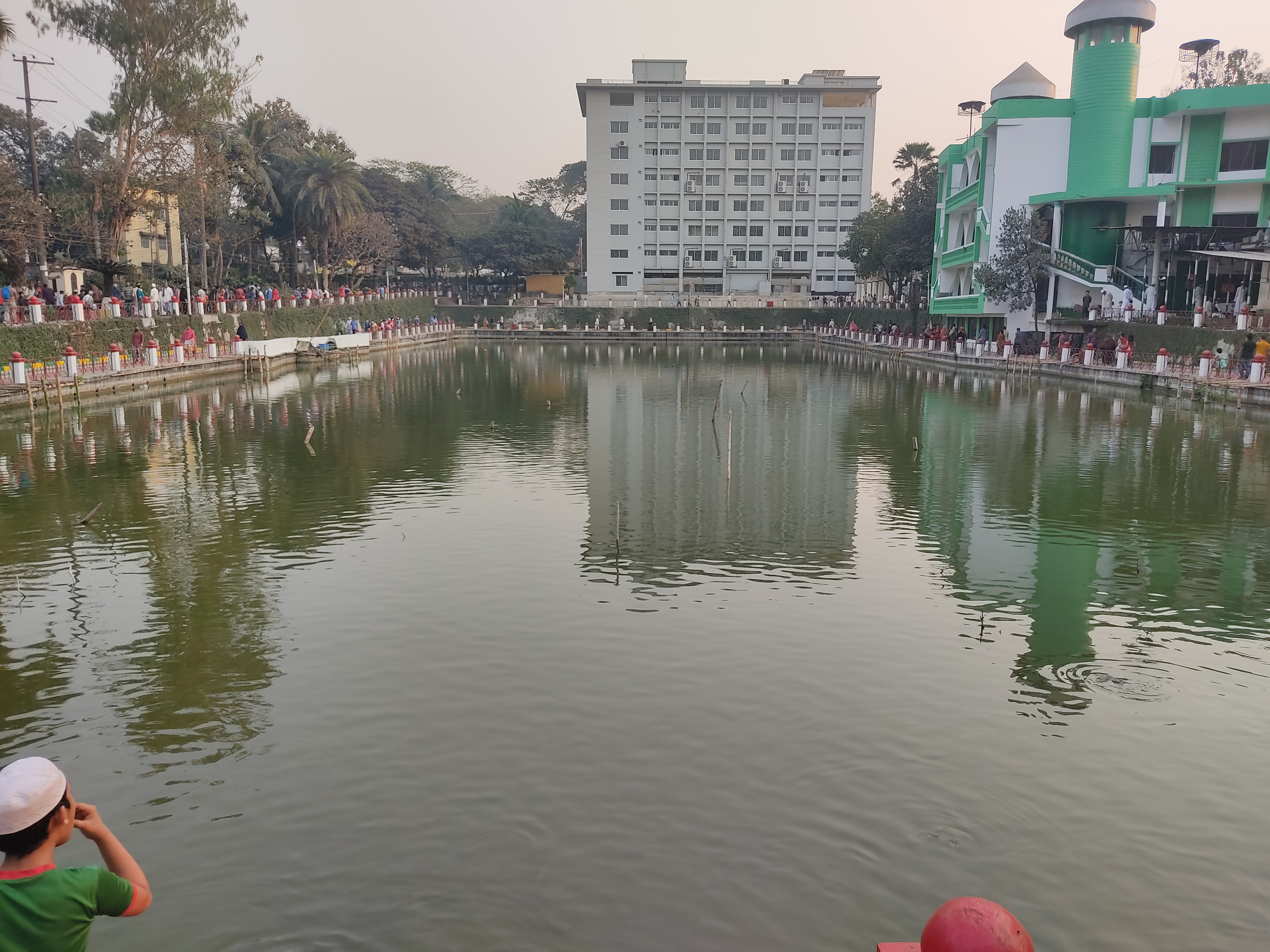
Lal Dighi located in Lal Dighi Park

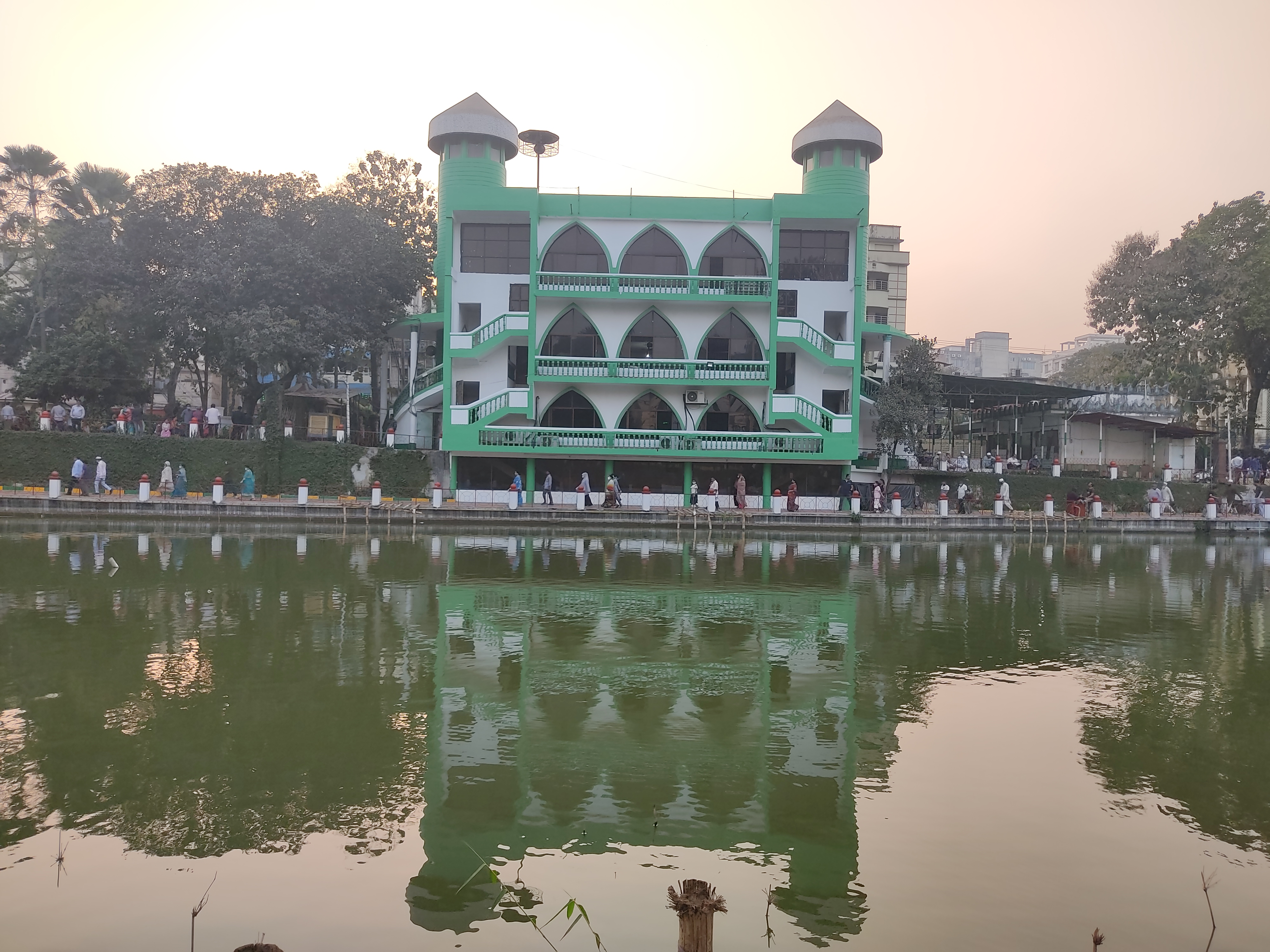
Lal Dighi Shahe Jame Masjid

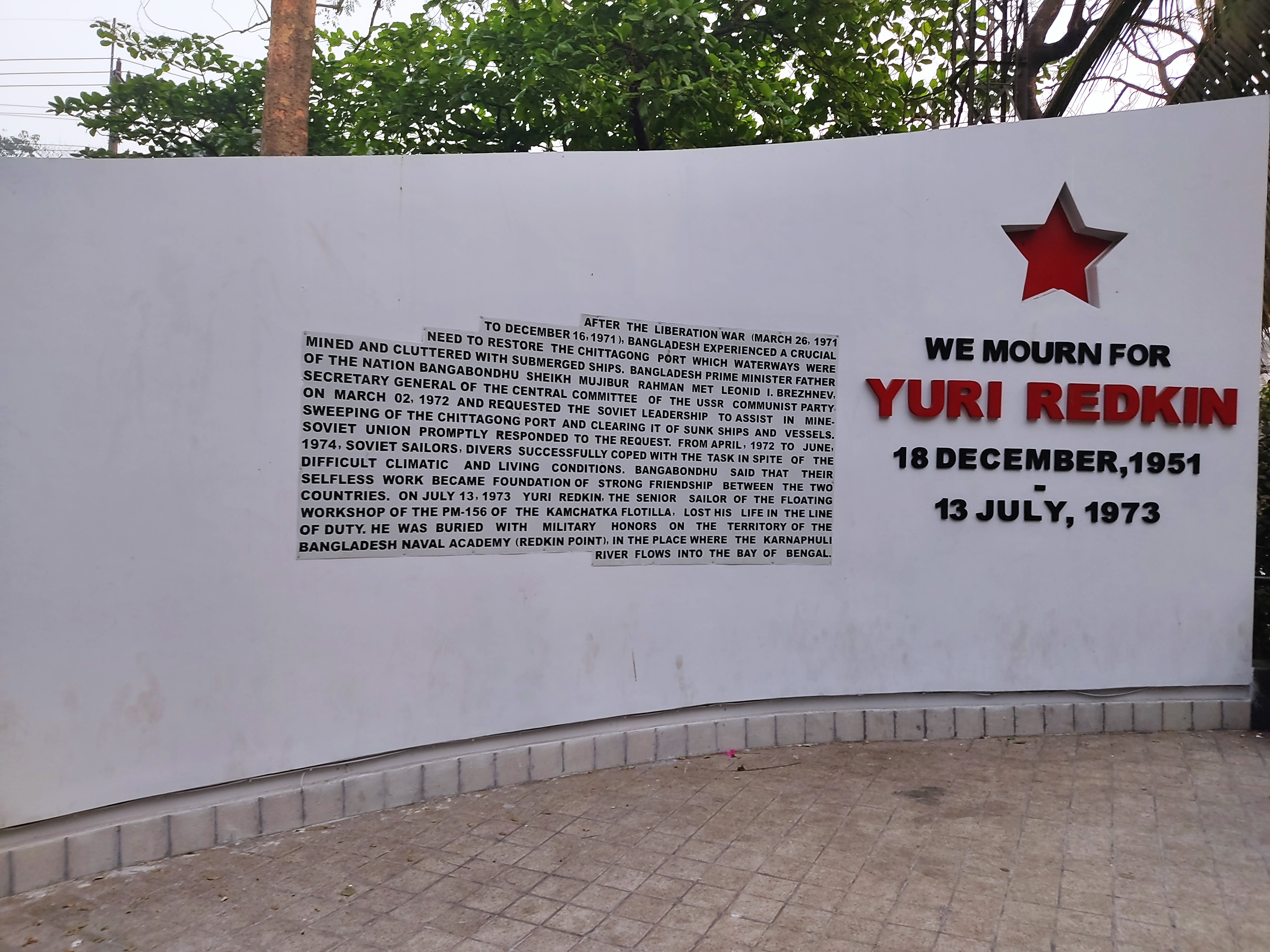
Radkin Memorial located in Lal Dighi

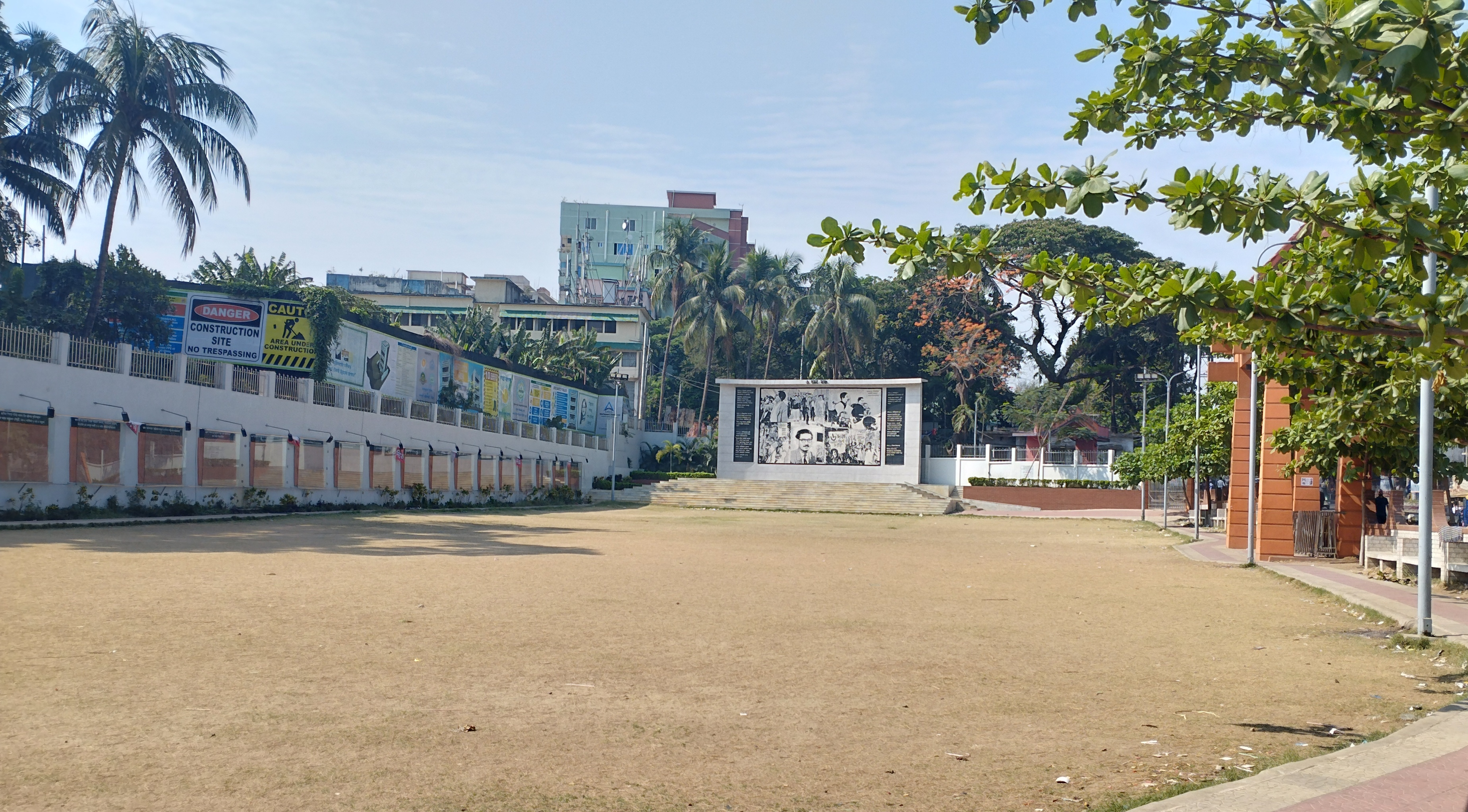
Laldighi field

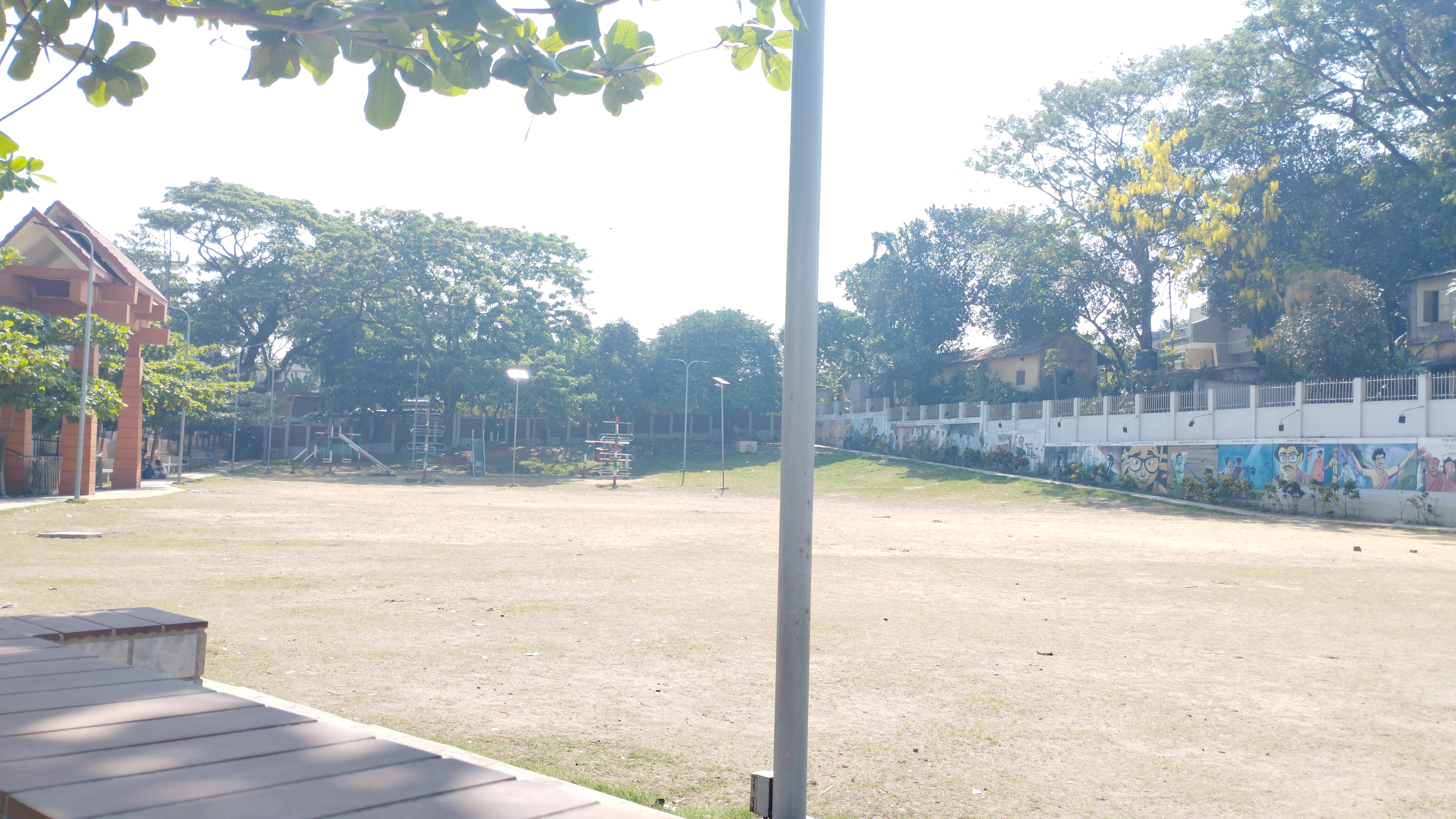
Laldighi field
