= Surya Sen =

Indian revolutionary (1894–1934)

Master Da Surya Sen
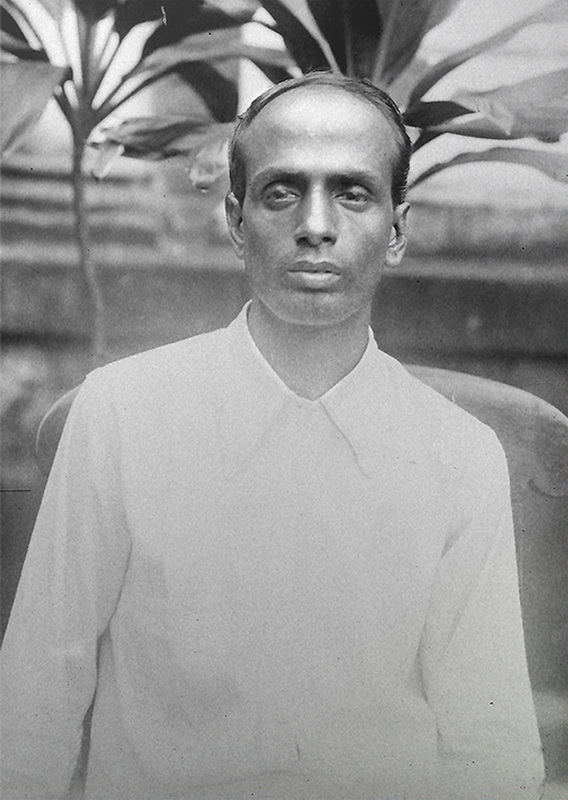
- Sen in 1924
- Born: 22 March 1894; Noapara, Bengal, British Raj
- Died: 12 January 1934 (aged 39); Chittagong Central Jail, Bengal, British Raj
- Organization(s): Indian National Congress, Jugantar, Anushilan Samiti
- Known for: Chittagong armoury raid
- Political party: Indian National Congress
- Movement: Indian Independence movement
- Criminal penalty: Capital punishment
- Criminal status: Executed by hanging

Signature
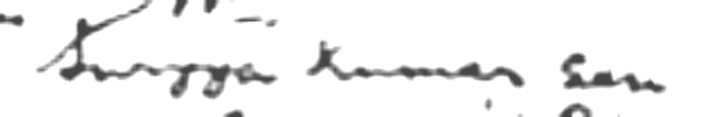

Surya Sen, also known as Surya Kumar Sen (22 March 1894 – 12 January 1934), was an Indian revolutionary who played a significant role in the Indian independence movement against British colonial rule. He is best known for leading the Chittagong Armoury Raid in 1930.

Sen was a schoolteacher by profession and was popularly known as Master Da ("da" is an honorific suffix derived from "dada", meaning "elder brother" in the Bengali language). He was influenced by the nationalist ideals in 1916 while he was a student of B.A. at Berhampore College (now Murshidabad Maharaja Krishnath University). In 1918, he was selected as president of the Indian National Congress's Chittagong branch. Sen was known for recruiting a group of young and passionate revolutionaries known as the Chittagong group. The group included Ananta Singh, Ganesh Ghosh, and Lokenath Bal, and fought against the British stationed in Chittagong.

He was an active participant in the Non-co-operation movement and was later arrested and imprisoned for two years, from 1926 to 1928, for his revolutionary activities. A brilliant and inspirational organiser, Sen was fond of saying, "Humanism is a special virtue of a revolutionary."

After the Chittagong raid in 1930 and a fierce battle where over 80 British Indian Army soldiers and 12 revolutionaries were killed, Sen and other surviving revolutionaries dispersed into small groups and hid in neighbouring villages, launching raids on government personnel and property. Sen was arrested on 16 February 1933 when he was hiding in his close family member's house of Khirodprova Biswas. He was tried and was hanged on 12 January 1934. Many of his fellow revolutionaries were also caught and sentenced to long periods of imprisonment.

== Early life ==
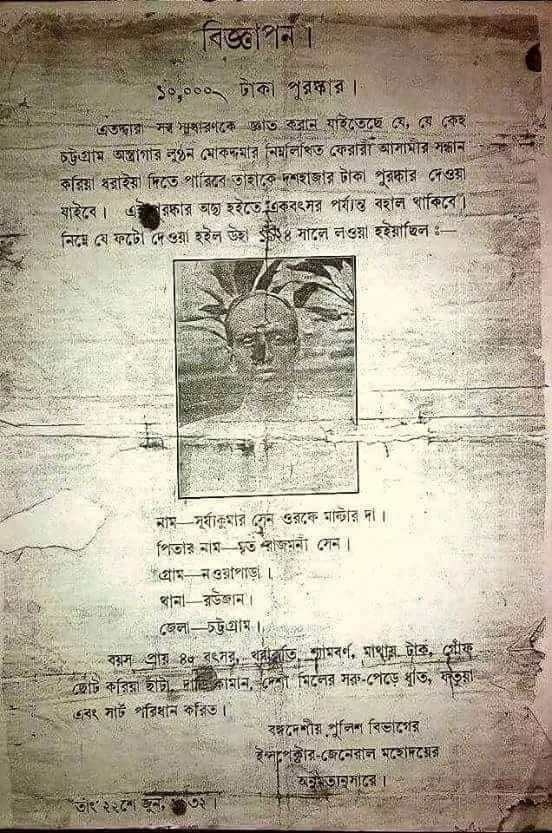
Sen wanted for 10,000 taka, poster distributed by the Inspector-General of the Police Division of Chittagong in 1932.

Sen was born on 22 March 1894 in a Bengali Baidya family at Noapara, under Raozan Upazila in Chittagong, Bengal Presidency, British India. His father, Rama niranjan Sen, was a teacher. In 1916, when he was a B.A. student at Berhampore College (now Krishnath College) of Murshidabad, he learned about the Indian freedom movement from one of his teachers, Shatishchandra Chakrabarti. When Sen came to Chittagong in 1918, he started teaching at the local National School, becoming famous with the honorific Master da. Later, he left his job and became the president of the Chittagong branch of the Indian National Congress.

Sen actively participated in the Non-Cooperation Movement. He looted the treasury of the Assam-Bengal Railway for cash money to fuel the movement, for which he was imprisoned with fellow revolutionary Ambika Chakrabarty for two years. Both were released towards the end of 1928 and resumed their activities.

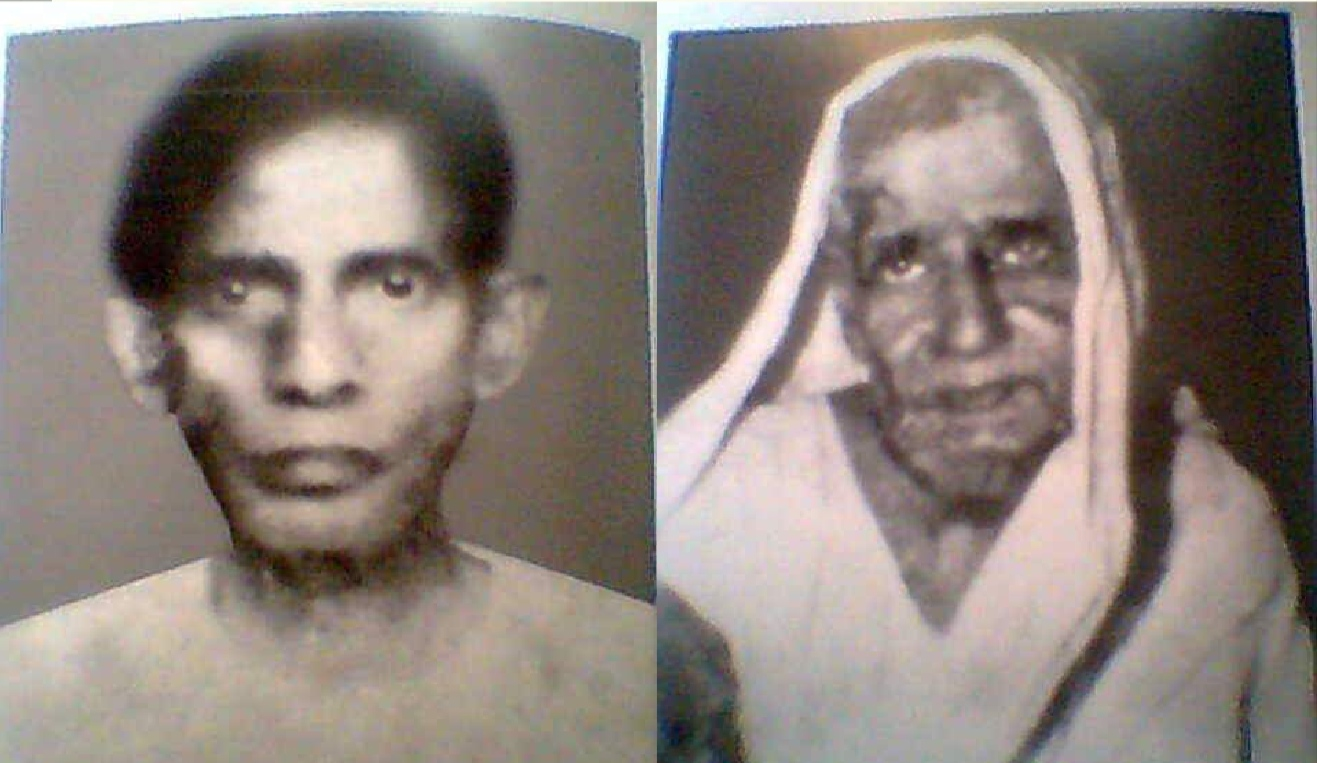
Surya Sen's elder brother, Chandra kumar Sen, and his wife, Birajmohini devi, sister-in-law of Surya Sen

== Chittagong armoury raid ==
Sen led a group of revolutionaries on 18 April 1930 to raid the armouries of police and auxiliary forces in Chittagong. The plan was elaborate and included seizing arms from the armoury as well as destruction of communication system of the city (including telephone, telegraph, and railway), thereby isolating Chittagong from the rest of British Raj. However, although the group gained the arms, they failed to capture the ammunition. They hoisted the Indian National Flag on the premises of the armoury, and then escaped. A few days later, a large fraction of the revolutionary group was cornered on Jalalabad Hill by a British Indian Army detachment. In the ensuing fight, twelve revolutionaries died, many were arrested, while some managed to flee, including Sen.

== Arrest and death ==
Sen stayed in hiding, and kept moving from one place to another. Sometimes he took up a job as a workman, a farmer, a priest, a house worker or even hid as a pious Muslim. This is how he avoided being captured by the British.

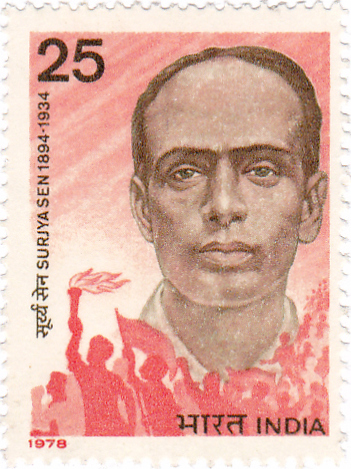
Surya Sen 1978 stamp of India

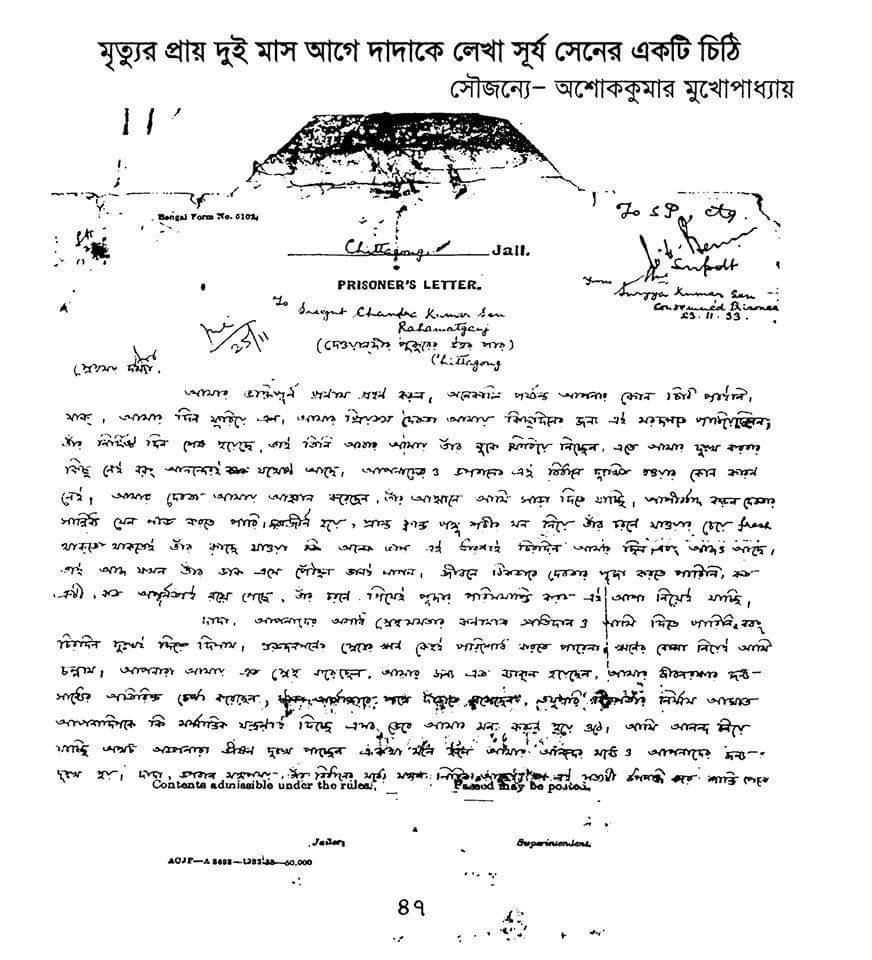
Masterda Surya Sen's letter to his elder brother, Chandra kumar Sen

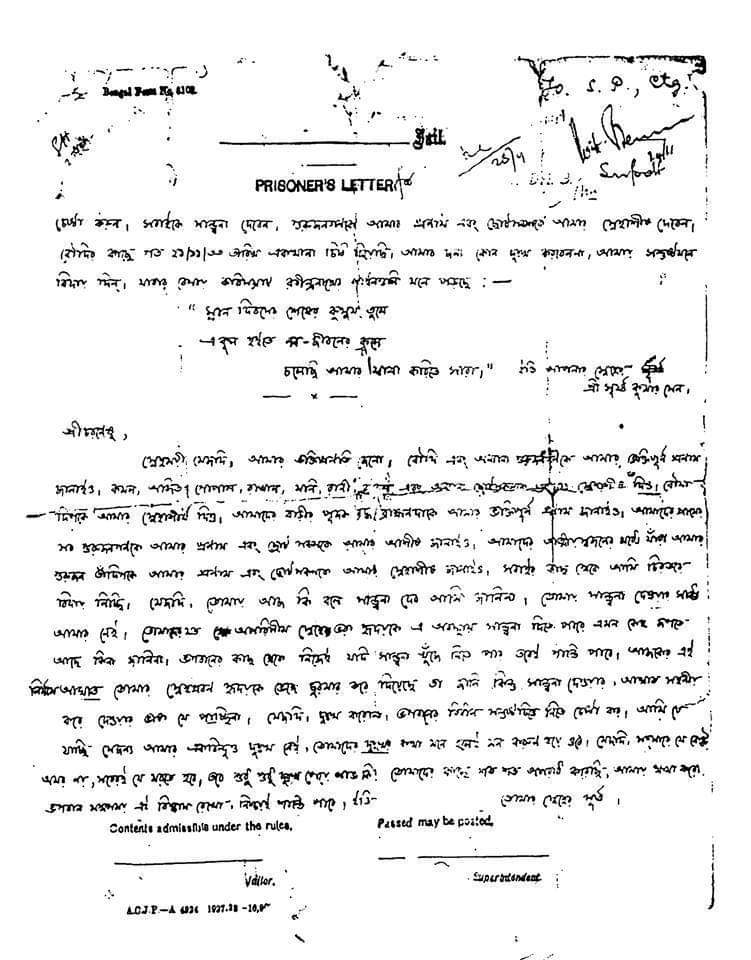
Surya Sen's letter to his sister-in-law, Birajmohini devi

He hid in the house of a friend. His relative named Netra Sen lived not far away. But Netra Sen informed the British of his hiding place, and the police came and captured him in February 1933. Before Netra Sen could be rewarded by the British, revolutionaries named Kironmoy Sen along with Rabindra Nandi came into his house and beheaded him with a da (a long knife). As Netra Sen's wife was a big supporter of Surya Sen, she never disclosed the names of the revolutionaries who killed Netra Sen. Before his eventual hanging on 12 January 1934 with another revolutionary named Tarakeswar Dastidar, both Sen and Dastidar underwent torture at the hands of the police.

His last letter was written to his friends and said, "Death is knocking at my door. My mind is flying away towards eternity. At such a pleasant, at such a grave, at such a solemn moment, what shall I leave behind you? Only one thing, that is my dream, a golden dream – the dream of free India. Never forget the date, 18th of April, 1930, the day of the eastern Rebellion in Chittagong. Write in red letters in the core of your hearts the names of the patriots who have sacrificed their lives at the altar of India's freedom."

The gallows in Chattogram (Chittagong) Central Jail, where Indian revolutionary freedom fighter Surya Sen was hanged. The government of Bangladesh (East Bengal) has designated it a historical monument.

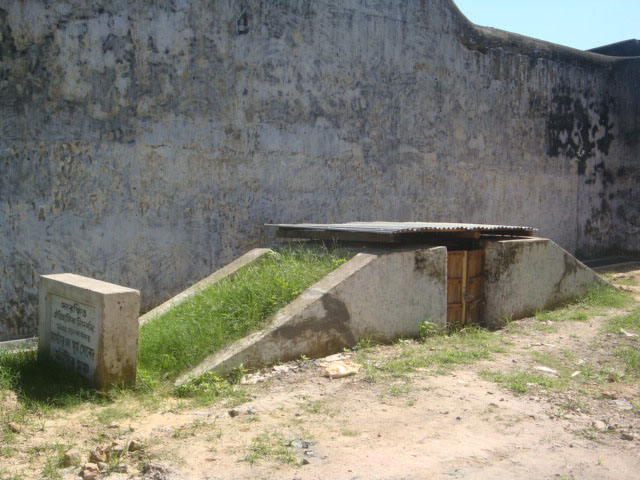

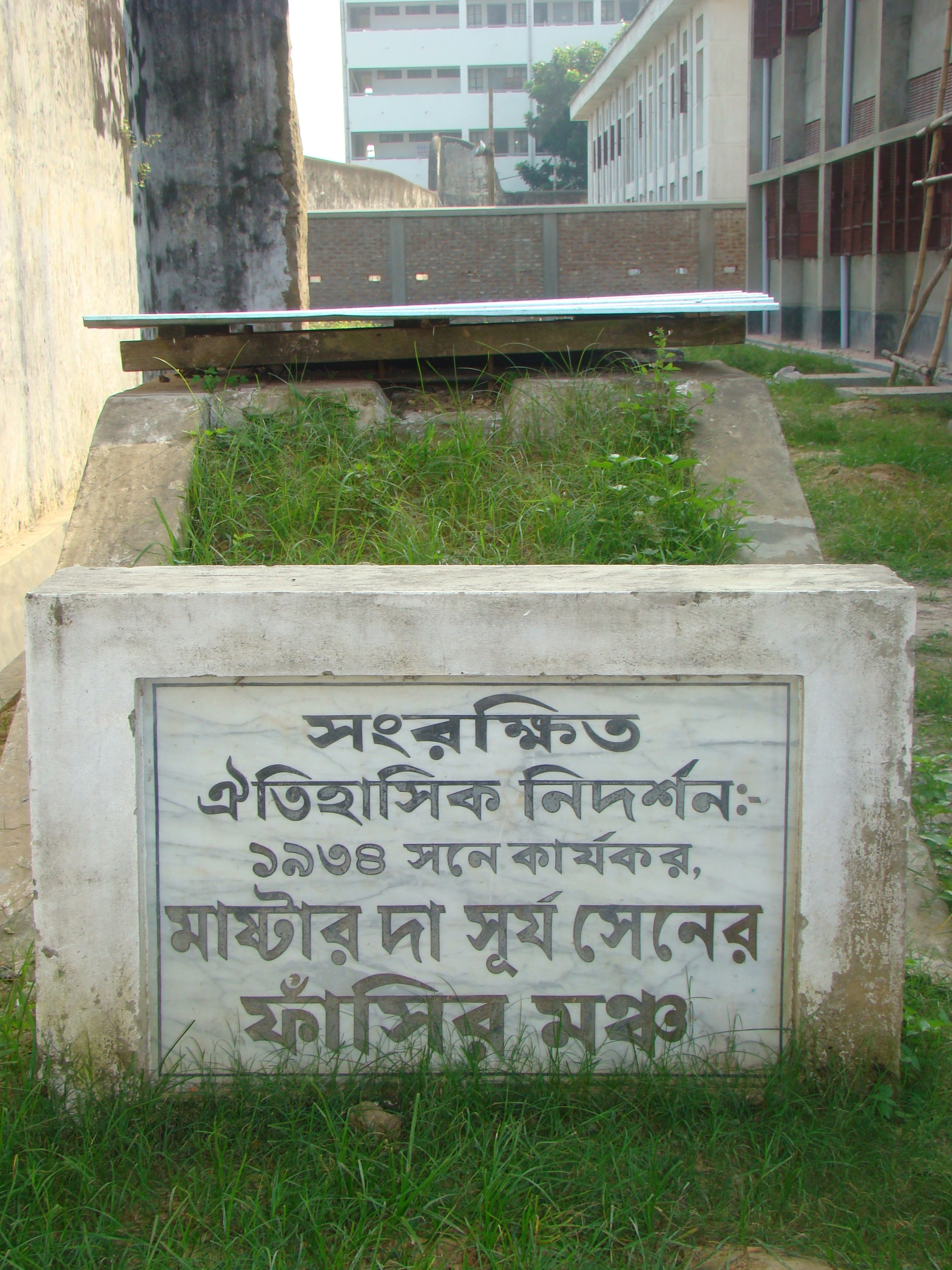

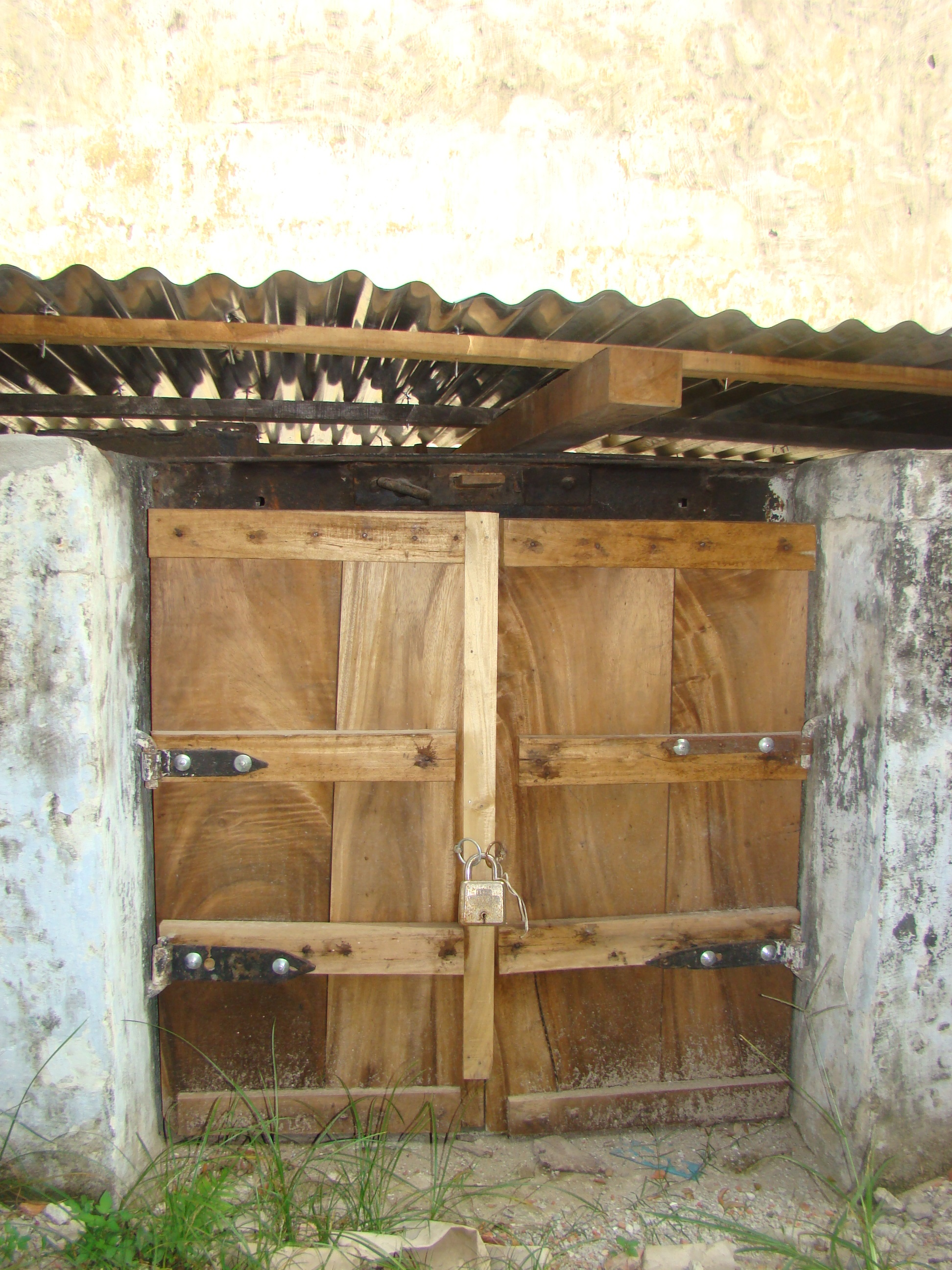

== In popular media ==
Indian film director Ashutosh Gowariker directed the film Khelein Hum Jee Jaan Sey (2010) about Sen's life. Actor Abhishek Bachchan played the role of Sen. Another film, Chittagong (2012), directed by Bedabrata Pain, was about Sen's armoury raid. Manoj Bajpayee played the leading role. A Bengali film Keu Bole Biplobi Keu Bole Dakat, directed by Pathikrrit Basu, is about the life and works of Ananta Singh. Loknath Dey portrays Sen in the film.

== Legacy ==
Surya Sen is considered one of the leading revolutionaries in British India, and is a highly respected figure in both Bangladesh and India. Residential halls have been named after him at both the University of Dhaka and the University of Chittagong. Kolkata has a metro railway station and a street named after him as well.

Surya Sen Park contains a bust of him.

== See also ==
- Pritilata Waddedar, Indian revolutionary and nationalist
- Bhagat Singh, Indian revolutionary and nationalist
- Udham Singh, Indian revolutionary and nationalist
