= Basak (surname) =

Origin
- Origin: Bengali Hindu
- Region of origin: Bengal

Basak or Bosak (Bengali: বসাক) is a Bengali Hindu surname that is found among the Bengalis of West Bengal, Bihar, Jharkhand, Assam and Tripura as well as in Bangladesh. The surname is mainly used by the higher class Tantis of Bengal. In West Bengal and Assam, this surname is written as Basak while in some districts of Bihar as Basak or Bosak. The name is also spelt Bysack or Basacks by different families.

== Geographical distribution ==
As of 2014, 58.5% of all known Basaks were residents of India and 30.1% were residents of Bangladesh. In India, the frequency of the name was higher than national average in:

- West Bengal (1: 717)
- Tripura (1: 1,334)

== Notable individuals ==
- Subimal Basak, Indian fiction writer
- Gour Das Bysack, Bengali writer
- Netai Chand Bysack (1921–2005), Indian cyclist
- Arun Kumar Basak (born 1941), Bangladeshi physicist
- Jharna Basak (born 1946), Bangladeshi actress
- Soumen Basak, Indian immunologist and virologist
- Birendra Basak (1912–?), Indian water polo player
- Biren Kumar Basak (born 1951), Indian handloom weaver from the Nadia district
- Nani Bashak (1917–1996), Bangladeshi football referee and coach
- Shyamal Bashak (born 1967), Bangladeshi artist
- Krishnalal Bysack, Indian circus performer and entrepreneur
- Vijaykumar Vyshak (born 1997), Indian cricketer
- Arup Basak (born 1973), Indian table tennis player
