= Basak =

Basak may refer to:

- Basak, Iran, a village in Iran
- Basak, Mandaue, a barangay of Mandaue, Province of Cebu, Philippines
- Basak, Lapu-Lapu City, a barangay of Lapu-Lapu City, Province of Cebu, Philippines
- Basak, Bais City, a barangay of Bais City, Negros Oriental, Philippines
- Başak, a Turkish given name or surname
- Basak (surname), a Bengali Hindu family name
- Bassac River or Basak
- Bosak, a Polish surname
- Basak or lakhon bassac, a theatre form in the theatre of Cambodia
- Basak Traktor, a Turkish tractor company
