= Shyamal =

Shyamal may refer to:

== People ==
- Shyamal Bagchee (born 1945), Indo-Canadian poet, academic, and erotic photo artist
- Shyamal Bashak (born 1967), Bangladeshi artist
- Shyamal Bose (born 1963), Indian film director, actor and screenwriter
- Shyamal Datta (born 1941), Indian police officer and politician
- Shyamal Gangapadhyay (1933–2001), Bengali novelist and editor
- Shyamal Mitra (1929–1987), Indian composer, singer and film producer
- Shyamal Mondal, Indian politician
- Shyamal Kumar Sen (born 1940), Indian politician
- Shyamal Sinha (1930–1963), Indian cricketer and cricket coach

== See also ==
- Shyamala (disambiguation)
