= Krishnalal Bysack =

Indian circus performer

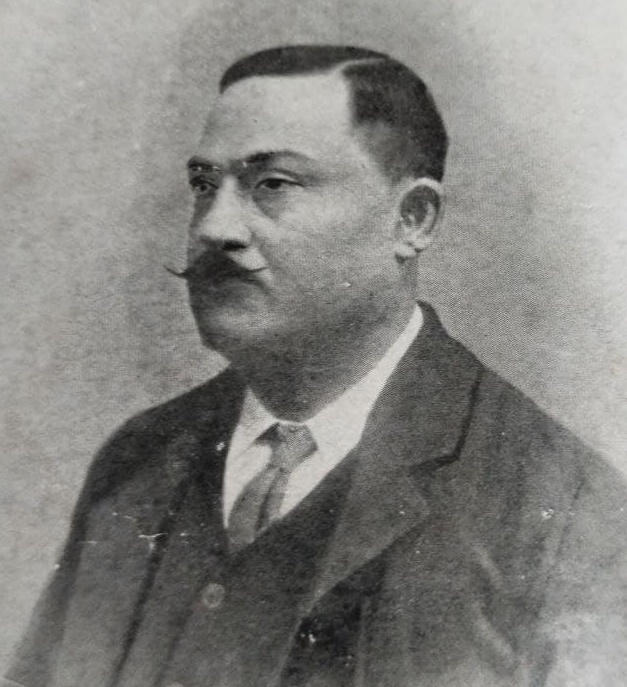
- Born: 21 April 1866; Calcutta, Bengal, British India
- Died: 19 October 1935 (aged 69); Baranagar, Bengal, British India
- Known for: Gymnast and Entrepreneur

Krishnalal Bysack (Bengali: কৃষ্ণলাল বসাক) was an Indian circus performer and entrepreneur. He founded the Hippodrome Circus with an all-Indian team and toured Bengal, India and South East Asia. He is considered to be one the pioneers of circus and physical culture in Bengal as well as India. He was a descendant of Sovaram Bysack, a well known merchant and zamindar during British Raj in India.

== Early life ==
Krishnalal was born in Ahiritola area of Kolkata, Bengal in the year of 1866. His father was Chandranath Basak and his mother was daughter of Brindaban Basak. He lost his mother at a young age and was raised by his grandparents.

== Career ==
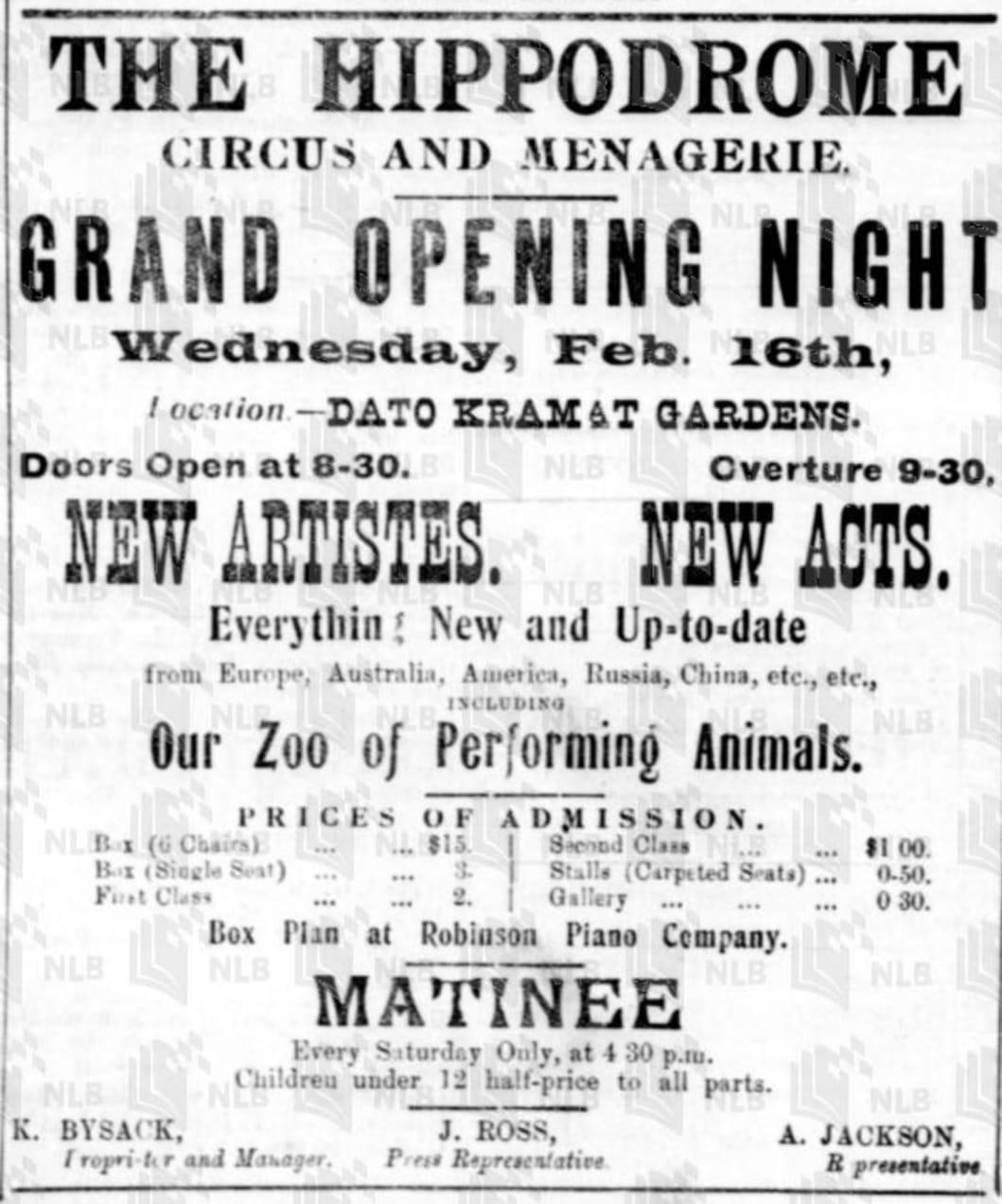
Hippodrome Circus Advertisement

Krishnalal learnt gymnastics at a young age and gained expertise over the years. In 1882, he won praises after performing gymnastics in Sovabazar Rajbari. He was famous for juggling, parallel bars, trapeze, top spinning etc. He travelled many countries performing his shows. In early 1900s he established his own circus known as The Great Indian Circus which was later renamed as Hippodrome Circus. At its peak period, there were over 200 performers in his troupe.

After retiring, he continued with teaching gymnastics and wrote his autobiography 'Bichitra Bhraman' (Bengali: বিচিত্র ভ্রমণ meaning Amazing Travelogue) which was published in 1921.

== See also ==
- Priyanath Bose
- Soham Swami
- Ganapati Chakraborty
- Sushila Sundari
