= Sushila Sundari =

First Indian woman to perform in a circus

Sushila Sundari সুশীলাসুন্দরী
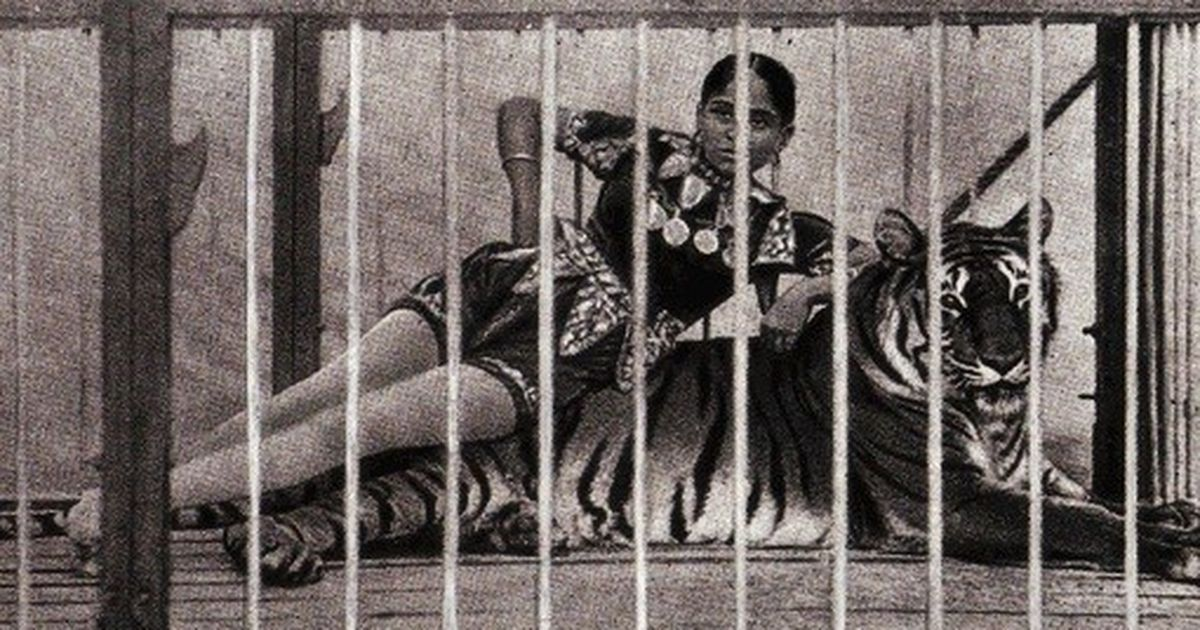
- Sushila Sundari posing for photograph, reclining herself on Lakshmi, a tigress, in its cage.
- Born: 1879; Calcutta, Bengal presidency, British India
- Died: 1924 (aged 44–45)
- Occupation: Circus performer
- Known for: First Indian woman to perform in a circus
- Spouse: Mr Motilal Bose

Sushila Sundari Bose (1879–1924) was the first Indian woman to perform in a circus. She was known for her daring acts with the tigers at the Great Bengal Circus.

== Early life ==
Like her husband, Motilal Bose (son of Manomohan Bose and elder brother of Priyanath Bose), Sushila Sundari Bose was born into a zamindar family of the Rambagan area in the year 1879 of old Calcutta. Her primary education was started at Bethune School. In her childhood she learnt horse riding and wrestling with the other members of her family. Later she became the daughter-in-law of the famous Bose family of Chhota Jagulia, North 24 Parganas District of present-day West Bengal. She was fluent in English, Hindi, Sanskrit, Marathi and many other Indian languages. Her father's family was against her involvement in the circus, but her husband gave her support. In the circus, before her performance with tigers her acrobatics, and other performances like cartwheel and daredevil performance were very popular. Very little is known about her family background and early life. It is said that she is probably from a branch of the Mitra family of Kolkata. Her sister Kumudini Devi was also a performer at the Great Bengal Circus.

== Career ==
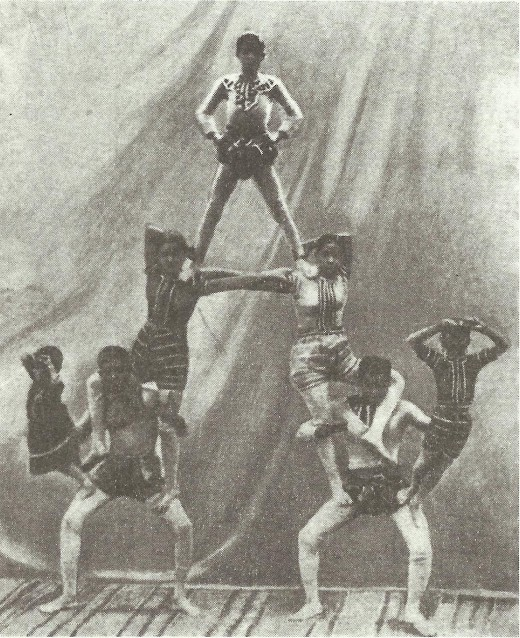
Sushila Sundari in pyramid act (middle row, on the right)(on the left side her sister Kumudini Devi)

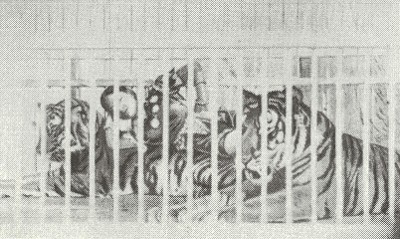
Sushila Sundari with Shumbha and Nishumbha

Sushila Sundari's was one of the star performers of the Great Bengal Circus, owned and directed by Professor Bose (Priyanath Bose). She was an expert gymnast and trapeze artist. She could also ride a horse. At the opening of the show, she and her sister Kumudini arrived on the stage riding and standing on horse.

In November 1896, the Great Bengal Circus displayed their acts at the durbar of Rewa. The prince of Rewa was so pleased with their performance that he gifted them a pair of Bengal tigers. The tigers were believed to bring luck to the team and therefore christened as Lakshmi and Narayan, after the Hindu deities. Sushila learned how to master the tigers. By 1901, the shows of the Great Bengal Circus would feature Sushila Sundari in daring acts with the two tigers. She would enter their cage with ease and make them growl, stand up, and sit down. She would arm wrestle with them and display their open jaws. After that she would recline on them and pose for photographs.

A new tiger, named Fortune, severely wounded Sushila with its paw while she was working with it. She was left paralyzed. She then started to teach physical exercises, wrestling, sword fighting, stick wielding, cycle riding and horse riding in her husband Motilal Bose's akhra. Motilal Bose (classmate and friend of Narendranath Dutta/Swami Vivekananda.) was a wrestler who along with his brother Priyanath Bose founded several akhada like Chingirpota akhra whose members were later involved in revolutionary activities. The Bose family had a residence in Kolkata at the crossing of Bidhan Sarani and Vivekananda Road. Most of her students (both boys and girls) were later involved in revolutionary activities. Her health deteriorated and she died in 1924. Old people of her area are still remember a lady with chained tiger fluently chatting with young students in a royal manner.

== See also ==
- Priyanath Bose
- Soham Swami
