= Kurdish institutes =

Research institutions made for research on Kurds, Kurdish culture, or the Kurdish language

Kurdish institutes are research institutions established in different countries to conduct research and publications on the Kurdish people, culture, and/or language. The oldest and best known of Kurdish institute is the Kurdish Institute of Paris, which was established in 1983.

== Institutes ==
The Kurdish Institute of Paris (Kurdish: Enstîtuya kurdî ya Parîsê, French: Institut kurde de Paris) is a Paris-based institute founded in 1983 that studies Kurdish language and culture.

The Kurdish Institute of Brussels (Kurdish: Enstituya Kurdî ya Brukselê) is a social and cultural organization based in Brussels that researches Kurdish language and culture. It was founded in Belgium in October 1978. Its president is Derwes Ferho.

The Kurdish Institute of Istanbul (Kurdish: Enstîtuya Kurdî ya Stenbolê) is a research institution that focuses on Kurdish language, culture and literature, founded on April 18, 1992 in Istanbul. On December 31, 2016, it was closed by the Turkish Ministry of Interior under Article 11 of the State of Emergency.

The Kurdish Institute of Stockholm (Kurdish: Înstîtuya Kurdî li Stockholmê) is a social and cultural organization based in Stockholm, Sweden that researches Kurdish language and culture. It was established in 1996.

The Kurdish Institute of Diyarbakir (Kurdish: Enstîtuya Kurdî ya Amedê) was founded in 2004 in Diyarbakır. Its chairman is Nesim Gültek. The institute published by Osman Esad Efendi in 1901, in both Latin script and Arabic script, as well as in Zazaki Kurdish. The institute's goal is to make Kurdish a co-official language in Turkey alongside Turkish.

== Publications ==
Since 1987, Kurdish linguists from different regions have been publishing the linguistics newspaper called Kurmancî in the Kurmanji dialect (with French, Kurdish and Turkish translations) twice a year by the Kurdish Institute of Paris.
