= Bosák =

Bosák (feminine: Bosáková) is a Czech surname. It is derived from the word bosý ('barefoot'). The surname may have originated as a designation for a very poor person, or it denoted a member of a discalced order. Notable people with the surname include:

- Emanuel Bosák (1924–2011), Czech physical educationalist
- Eva Bosáková (1931–1991), Czech gymnast
- Jaromír Bosák (born 1965), Czech sports commentator and journalist

== See also ==
- Bosak, Polish surname
