= Charles Spencer (journalist) =

British journalist

Charles Spencer (born 4 March 1955) is a British journalist. He was the chief drama critic of The Daily Telegraph from 1991 to 2014, having joined the paper in 1988. On 1 September 2014, it was announced that he had decided to take early retirement, and his final review for the paper appeared on the same day.

He was educated at Charterhouse and Balliol College, Oxford. He began his career in journalism at the Surrey Advertiser, and subsequently wrote for the London Evening Standard, The Stage and Television Today, before joining the Telegraph. He won "Critic of the Year" in the 1999 British Press Awards. He has written three crime novels: I Nearly Died (1994), Full Personal Service (1996) and Under the Influence (2000).

In 2006, Compton Miller of The Independent wrote in a profile: "This convivial ex-alcoholic is best remembered for his description of Nicole Kidman's nude scene in The Blue Room as 'pure theatrical Viagra'."

In a review published in The Daily Telegraph on 6 September 2012, he revealed that the reason for his absence from the paper's pages for the previous three months was that he had been suffering from clinical depression.

Charles Spencer is descended from several generations of noted early aeronauts. His great-grandfather, Percival G. Spencer, made the first successful balloon flight in India, and Charles' third great-grandfather Edward Spencer helped to conduct an unsuccessful parachute jump from a balloon over Vauxhall Gardens in London in July 1837.
