= Ram Chandra Chatterjee =

Ram Chandra Chatterjee রামচন্দ্র চট্টোপাধ্যায়
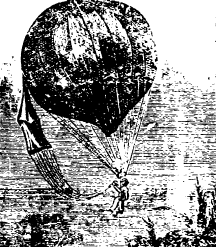
- Ram Chandra Chatterjee, riding a balloon, contemporary woodcraft
- Born: Kolkata, Bengal, British India
- Died: 9 August 1892; Kolkata, Bengal, British India
- Occupations: Acrobat, gymnast, balloonist and parachutist

Ram Chandra Chatterjee (died 9 August 1892) was first Indian aeronaut to fly solo. He is also an acrobat, gymnast, balloonist, parachutist and patriot. He was the first Indian to fly in a balloon and land in a parachute. He was also the first Indian to take up ballooning as a profession. His daring acts with the balloon and the parachute made him a national hero.

== Early life ==
Ram Chandra Chatterjee was a resident of Kansaripara, in the locality of Shimulia in North Kolkata. He started his career as an acrobat in the National Circus Company of Nabagopal Mitra, the founder of Hindu Mela. He was a flying trapeze player. Later he became the director of Great United Indian Circus Company. He also worked as teacher of gymnastics in the Government Normal School.

== Interest in ballooning ==
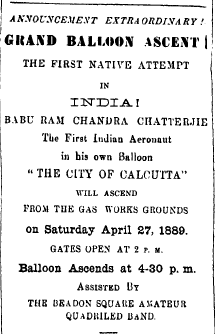
Advertisement of Chatterjee's first solo flight in The Bengalee

When Percival G. Spencer, a British balloonist arrived in Kolkata for his show, Chatterjee requested him to teach the art of ballooning. Spencer complied and Chatterjee had to pay him five hundred rupees for that.

=== First flight ===
He took the first flight with Percival Spencer on 10 April 1889, in the balloon named 'The Viceroy' from the grounds of the Oriental Gas Company in Narkeldanga. The Viceroy was filled with 20,000 cu.ft. of coal gas from a 6-inch gas main under the supervision of D. Coats Niven, the director of the gas company. The balloon took off at 3-30 PM and after an hour's journey they descended at the village of Palpakira-Kazipara, three miles away from Barasat.

The flight was reported in all the local newspapers and he was heralded as the first Indian aeronaut. Chatterjee was sponsored by Gopal Chandra Mukherjee, the maternal grandson of Jatindramohan Tagore, the landlord of Pathuriaghata and M. Mullick. After the successful flight Chatterjee announced his intention to run a balloon of his own and to make an extensive tour of India.

=== First solo flight ===
Thereafter, Chatterjee purchased 'The Viceroy' from Spencer and christened it 'The City of Calcutta'. He also floated the Calcutta Balloonists Company and announced his intention to make the first solo ascent on 27 April 1889. However, due to bad weather the flight was postponed till 4 May. A week later arrived the D-Day. A capacity crowd of 8,000 gathered to witness the spectacular event at the gas works grounds in Narkeldanga. J. Reid, the assistant manager of the gas company supervised the filling of the balloon. Clad in a light suit, with a binocular around his neck Chatterjee waved his cap as the balloon took off at 5-10 PM. After flying for 40 minutes in the northerly direction, he descended at Natagore, a village two miles from Sodepur. The account of the trip was published in The Bengalee on 11 May.

== Professional ballooning ==
Very soon, Chatterjee decided to embark upon the career of a professional balloonist and launched the Chatterjee's Ballooning Company for the purpose. He made himself open to engagements at any place where gas was available. He intended to visit Allahabad, Lahore, Jaipur, Lucknow, Dhaka and Kashmir.

=== Second solo flight ===
On 27 June 1889, Chatterjee made his second solo ascent in 'The City of Calcutta' from Khusrobagh in Allahabad. A capacity crowd of 10,000 had gathered to witness the spectacular event. But due to insufficient filling or poor quality of the gas, the balloon failed to take off, even when all the ballasts were completely removed from the basket. As a true professional, he decided not to dishearten the crowd. He, therefore, detached the basket and clung to the steel hoof and made the ascent. It was a daring act, as without the basket the descent was extremely treacherous, but with his courage and pluck he was able to land with ease.

=== First parachute descent ===
On 22 March 1890, Chatterjee set off in 'The Empress of India', fitted with a parachute from the Tivoli Gardens, near Minto Park in Kolkata at 5-30PM. And then arrived the moment he made history, when he leaped from an altitude of 3,500 ft and landed by parachute. The event was attended by His Excellency, the Amban, the Chinese Ambassador, Percival Spencer, Abanindranath Tagore and Yogindranath Sarkar. After the successful descent in a parachute, Chatterjee was given a public reception.

=== Tour of India ===
The City of Calcutta was not meant for parachuting and Chatterjee therefore procured one for the purpose. He renamed it 'Star of India'.

In November 1890, he made an ascent from Tis Hazari in Delhi and descended in the parachute, which earned him a prestigious reward from Nawab Jalal-ud-Dowlah Muhammad Mumtiaz Ali Khan. He repeated his feat on 8 March 1891 in Lahore and then in Rawalpindi. At his next stop in Indore he performed his feat in November 1891 at the request of the Maharaja of Indore in presence of the Viceroy. He followed it up in Agra in February 1892 and Varanasi in April 1892.

=== Fatal accident ===
He met with a serious accident while performing the show in a native state, when his balloon collided with a hill. He was rushed to Kolkata, where he died in Gopal Chandra Mukherjee's garden house on 9 August 1892.

== Legacy ==
Chatterjee's remarkable feats inspired his compatriots into embracing the new adventure game. Prabodh Chandra Laha ascended the sky alongside Spencer in 'The City of York' on 15 February 1890 from Kolkata. He followed it up with a solo ascent on 8 March in 'The Viceroy of India' which he subsequently purchased from Spencer. Laha made another successful attempt from Kanpur in March 1892.

The third Indian balloonist happened to be Jogesh Chandra Chaudhuri, the famous barrister, professor at the Metropolitan College and son-in-law of Surendranath Banerjee. He was the first Indian to make an ascent for scientific purposes.

Major Harry Hobbs, a long-time resident of Kolkata has mentioned in his memoirs that Ram Chandra Chatterjee's daughter was also as plucky as her father and she also flew balloons several times.
