= Başakköy, İdil =

Village in Şırnak Province, Turkey

Başakköy
- Village
- Location within Turkey
- Coordinates: 37.359°N 41.716°E
- Country: Turkey
- Province: Şırnak
- District: İdil
- Population (2021): 124
- Time zone: UTC+3 (TRT)

Başakköy (Note: Also known as Başak ("ear of corn" in Turkish).) (Kurdish: Basaqê, Syriac: Bēth Isḥaq) (Note: Alternatively transliterated as Basak, Bashok, Bassac, Besḥaq, Besük, Beth Ishak, Beth Ishaq, Beth Ishok, or Beth Ishoq.) is a village in the İdil District of Şırnak Province in Turkey. The village is populated by Kurds of the Domanan tribe and had a population of 124 in 2021. It is located in the historic region of Tur Abdin.

== History ==
Bēth Isḥaq (today called Başakköy) was historically inhabited by Syriac Orthodox Christians. In 1394/1395, it was attacked by Amiran-shah, son of Timur, following the destruction of Diyarbakır, and the villagers took refuge in the village's citadel, according to the account of the priest Addai of Beth Sbirino in c. 1500 appended to the Chronography of Bar Hebraeus. The citadel was seized, however, after its southern wall was undermined and destroyed and the men were killed whilst the women and children were taken captive. It was later also attacked by Bakhti Kurds in 1453 alongside the neighbouring villages of Beth Sbirino, Midun, and Araban. The Bakhti Kurds attacked Bēth Isḥaq, in addition to the villages of Midun and Araban, again in 1457 and settled there.

Yuhanna Murad, Syriac Orthodox metropolitan of Qartmin, (r. 1785–1800) was from Bēth Isḥaq. It was resettled by Christians in c. 1870 and was wholly inhabited by Christians in the late nineteenth century. In the Syriac Orthodox patriarchal register of dues of 1870, it was recorded that the village had 10 households, who paid 27 dues, and it was served by the Church or Morī Aday and one priest. In 1914, there were 120 Syriacs, as per the list presented to the Paris Peace Conference by the Assyro-Chaldean delegation. It was located in the kaza (district) of Midyat. 20 Syriac families inhabited Bēth Isḥaq in 1915. Amidst the Sayfo, a number of villagers sought protection at Beth Sbirino and Midun whilst Bēth Isḥaq itself was destroyed. The Church of Mar Addai was converted into a barn by 1978. By 1987, there were no remaining Syriacs.

== Bibliography ==
- Barsoum, Aphrem (2008). The History of Tur Abdin. Translated by Matti Moosa. Gorgias Press.
- Baz, Ibrahim (2016). Şırnak aşiretleri ve kültürü (in Turkish). p. 148. ISBN 9786058849631.
- Bcheiry, Iskandar (2009). The Syriac Orthodox Patriarchal Register of Dues of 1870: An Unpublished Historical Document from the Late Ottoman Period. Gorgias Press.
- Courtois, Sébastien de (2004). The Forgotten Genocide: Eastern Christians, The Last Arameans. Translated by Vincent Aurora. Gorgias Press.
- Gaunt, David (2006). Massacres, Resistance, Protectors: Muslim-Christian Relations in Eastern Anatolia during World War I. Gorgias Press.
- Jongerden, Joost; Verheij, Jelle, eds. (2012). Social Relations in Ottoman Diyarbekir, 1870-1915. Brill.
- Keser-Kayaalp, Elif, ed. (January 2022). Syriac Architectural Heritage at Risk in TurʿAbdin (PDF).
- Palmer, Andrew (1990). Monk and Mason on the Tigris Frontier: The Early History of Tur Abdin. Cambridge University Press.
- Sinclair, T. A (1989). Eastern Turkey: An Architectural & Archaeological Survey. Vol. III.
