= Shyamala =

Shyamala or Syamala may refer to:

== People ==
=== Surname ===
- Gogu Shyamala, Indian Telugu-language writer and women's activist
- Pavala Syamala, Indian actress
- P. R. Shyamala (1931–1990), Indian Malayalam-language novelist and short story writer
- R. Shyamala, Indian politician from Tamil Nadu

=== Given name ===
- Shyamala Goli, Indian endurance swimmer
- Shyamala Gopalan (1938–2009), Indian-American cancer researcher and civil rights activist
- Shyamala Gopinath (born 1949), Indian bank executive
- Syamala Kumari, Indian temple painter
- Shyamala Pappu (1933–2016), Indian lawyer
- Shyamala Rajender, plaintiff in the 1973 lawsuit Rajender v. University of Minnesota

== Other uses ==
- Shyamala (film), a 1952 Indian Tamil-language film
- Shimla, Himachal Pradesh, India, a city that rejected a name-change to Shyamala in 2018

== See also ==
- Shyamal (disambiguation)
