= Charles Green Spencer =

Aviator & Founder of C. G. Spencer & Sons

Charles Green Spencer (1837–1890) was a pioneer aviator who founded the balloon manufacturing company C. G. Spencer & Sons.

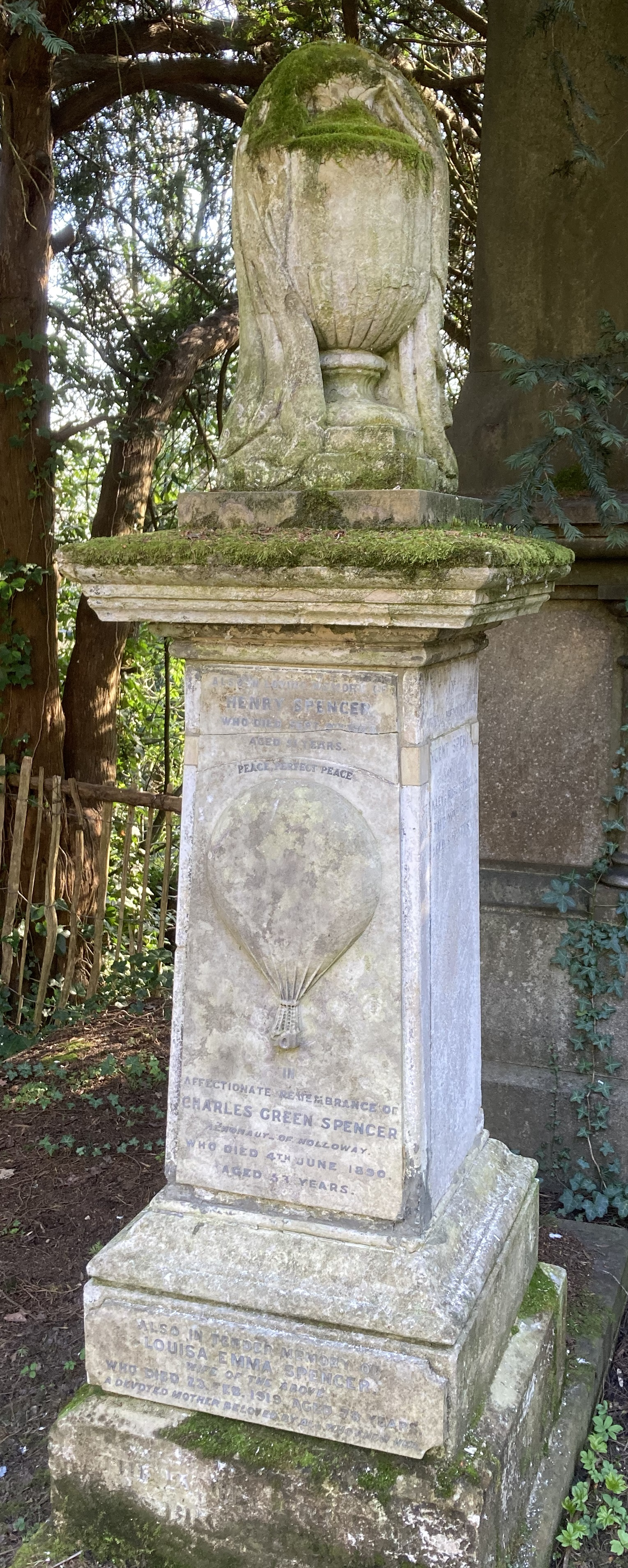
Grave of Charles Green Spencer in Highgate Cemetery (west side)

== Biography ==
Charles Green Spencer was the son of Edward Spencer (1799–1849) and Diana Snoxell. His father was a solicitor and friend of the noted balloonist Charles Green, the United Kingdom's most famous balloonist of the 19th century, ascending with Green 27 times and soloing 40 times. He also made first gliding experiments in England.

Charles Spencer founded the balloon manufacturing firm of C. G. Spencer & Sons initially at 14 Ringcroft Street, Holloway, later moving to 56a Highbury Grove, Islington. The firm for many years enjoyed a virtual monopoly in the manufacture of balloons and went on to be "manufacturers of aeronautical apparatus of every description" and specifically "balloons, airships and flying machines". Later it was manufacturing "Salvus" parachutes with their promise of the "certainty of escape for aviators".

He died on 4 June 1890 and is buried in the western side of Highgate Cemetery. His namesake, Charles Green, had been buried 20 years earlier on the eastern side of the same cemetery.

== Children ==
He married Louise Emma Woodward (1840-1919) and they had eight children:

- Percival Green Spencer (1864-1913), the most famous balloonist and parachutist of the Edwardian era. First ascended in a balloon at the age of eight with his father over the Crystal Palace and went on to undertake over 1,000 ascents all over the world.
- Arthur Charles (1866–1940), with his brother Stanley considered a leading authority on ballooning and parachuting
- Stanley Edward (1868–1906), made early airships
- Marina (1871-1930), professional balloonist and worked in the family firm. Married Auguste Gaudron.
- Julia Diana (1876-?)
- Henry Spencer (1877-1937), made and flew the first airship from London. He was a professional balloon maker with Auguste Gaudron until 1914. Father of aeronauts Ena Louise Spencer and Percival Frederick Spencer.
- Sydney Ewart (1879-1960)
- Herbert (1880-?), worked in the family firm.
