= Doğançay, Midyat =

Doğançay
- Neighbourhood
- Location in Turkey
- Coordinates: 37.372°N 41.448°E
- Country: Turkey
- Province: Mardin
- District: Midyat
- Population (2021): 159
- Time zone: UTC+3 (TRT)

Doğançay (Kurdish: Mizîzex; Syriac: Mzīzāḥ) (Note: Alternatively transliterated as Mizizah, Mizizan, Mozizah, Mzaizah, Mzezak, Mzizah, or Mzīzax. Nisba: Mzīzaxī.) is a village in the district of Midyat, Mardin Province in Turkey. It is populated by Syriacs and by Kurds of the Zaxuran tribe. The village had a population of 159 in 2021. It is located in the historic region of Tur Abdin.

In the village, there is a church of Mor Yuhannon and a church of the Virgin Mary.

== History ==
In the Syriac Orthodox patriarchal register of dues of 1870, it was recorded that Mzīzāḥ (today called Doğançay) had sixteen households, who paid forty-one dues, and was served by the Church of Morī Yūḥanūn, but it did not have a priest. In 1914, it was inhabited by 350 Syriacs, according to the list presented to the Paris Peace Conference by the Assyro-Chaldean delegation. They adhered to the Syriac Orthodox Church.

Amidst the Sayfo, the Syriacs of Mzīzāḥ fled with their possessions in July 1915 upon hearing of the attack on Midyat to ‘Ayn-Wardo, where they subsequently came under siege. Mas’ud Shabo from the Musa Gebro family of Mzīzāḥ was chosen to lead the defence of ‘Ayn-Wardo. Those who attempted to return Mzīzāḥ after a ceasefire had been agreed were shot. The Syriacs were able to return to the village with the aid of Çelebi Ağa after his release from prison following the end of the First World War. In the aftermath of the Sheikh Said rebellion, 150 Syriacs were deported from Midyat, ‘Iwardo, Anhel, Midun, and Mzīzāḥ, according to a letter in the Vatican Apostolic Archive.

The first Turkish primary school was founded at Mzīzāḥ in 1953. In 1960, the population was 927. There were 724 Turoyo-speaking Christians in 100 families at Mzīzāḥ in 1966 and were served by one priest. By 1980, the village was inhabited by 150 families, half of whom were Syriac whilst the other half was Kurdish. In the late 20th century, a number of Syriacs emigrated abroad to Germany. Yazidis also historically inhabited the village. In 2003, the restoration of the Church of Mar-Yuhanon was financed by the village's expatriate community.

== Demography ==
The following is a list of the number of Syriac families that have inhabited Mzīzāḥ per year stated. Unless otherwise stated, all figures are from the list provided in The Syrian Orthodox Christians in the Late Ottoman Period and Beyond: Crisis then Revival, as noted in the bibliography below. (Note: The size of a single family varies between five and ten persons.)

- 1915: 70
- 1966: 100
- 1978: 80
- 1981: 56
- 1987: 35
- 1995: 8
- 1997: 7
- 2013: 6–7

The following is a list of the number of Kurdish families that have inhabited Mzīzāḥ per year stated.

- 1915: 50
- 2013: 18

== Notable people ==
- Derwich Ferho (b. 1961), Kurdish activist

== Bibliography ==
- Atto, Naures (2011). Hostages in the Homeland, Orphans in the Diaspora: Identity Discourses Among the Assyrian/Syriac Elites in the European Diaspora (PDF). Leiden University Press.
- Barsoum, Aphrem (2008). The History of Tur Abdin. Translated by Matti Moosa. Gorgias Press.
- Bcheiry, Iskandar (2009). The Syriac Orthodox Patriarchal Register of Dues of 1870: An Unpublished Historical Document from the Late Ottoman Period. Gorgias Press.
- Biner, Zerrin Özlem (2020). States of Dispossession: Violence and Precarious Coexistence in Southeast Turkey. University of Pennsylvania Press.
- Brock, Sebastian (2021). "The Syrian Orthodox Church in the twentieth century". Eastern Christianity, Theological Reflection on Religion, Culture, and Politics in the Holy Land and Christian Encounter with Islam and the Muslim World (PDF). Living Stones of the Holy Land Trust. pp. 155–181.
- Courtois, Sébastien de (2004). The Forgotten Genocide: Eastern Christians, The Last Arameans. Translated by Vincent Aurora. Gorgias Press.
- Courtois, Sébastien de (2013). "Tur Abdin : Réflexions sur l'état présent descommunautés syriaques du Sud-Est de la Turquie, mémoire, exils, retours". Cahier du Gremmamo (in French). 21: 113–150.
- Dinno, Khalid S. (2017). The Syrian Orthodox Christians in the Late Ottoman Period and Beyond: Crisis then Revival. Gorgias Press.
- Gaunt, David (2006). Massacres, Resistance, Protectors: Muslim-Christian Relations in Eastern Anatolia during World War I. Gorgias Press.
- Hollerweger, Hans; Palmer, Andrew (1999). Turabdin: Living Cultural Heritage (in English, German, and Turkish) (2nd ed.). Friends of Tur Abdin.
- Jongerden, Joost; Verheij, Jelle, eds. (2012). Social Relations in Ottoman Diyarbekir, 1870-1915. Brill.
- Korkut, Tahsin (2019). "Turabdin Bölgesi Hristiyan Dini Mimarisinde Midyat (2017 Yılı Arkeolojik Yüzey Araştırması)". Atlas International Refereed Journal ın Social Sciences (in Turkish). 5 (19): 323–349.
- Palmer, Andrew (1990). Monk and Mason on the Tigris Frontier: The Early History of Tur Abdin. Cambridge University Press.
- Ritter, Hellmut (1967). Turoyo: Die Volkssprache der Syrischen Christen des Tur 'Abdin (in German). Vol. 1. Franz Steiner Verlag.
- Tan, Altan (2011). Turabidin'den Berriye'ye. Aşiretler - Dinler - Diller - Kültürler (in Turkish).
