= Derwich Ferho =

Ferho Derwich (born 2 October 1961 in Mzizah, Turkey) is one of the chairmen (along with his brother Medeni Akgül) of the Kurdish Institute of Brussels in Belgium.

He arrived in Belgium as a refugee on 3 February 1977. In 1978, he founded TEKOSER (the Kurdish Workers and Student Community), which was known as the 'Kurdish Institute of Brussels'. From June 1980 to July 1981, he was employed in the University Hospitals of Leuven as General Coordinator in the Central Medical Archives.

In 1989, he founded the Kurdish Institute of Brussels, where he has worked since. In March 2006, his parents Fatim and Ferho Akgül were murdered in Mzizah.

He speaks Kurdish, Turkish and Dutch, with an elementary reading level in French, English and German.

He has published Kurdish poems in Dutch, Swedish and Turkish.
