= Karalar, İdil =

Municipality in Şırnak Province, Turkey

Karalar
- Municipality
- Location in Turkey
- Coordinates: 37.299°N 41.677°E
- Country: Turkey
- Province: Şırnak
- District: İdil
- Population (2021): 4,065
- Time zone: UTC+3 (TRT)

Karalar (Arabic: عربان; Kurdish: Eraban; Syriac: ܥܪܒܐܢ, romanized: ʿArban) (Note: Alternatively transliterated as Araban, Araben, ʿArobon, ʿArūn, or ʿArwan.) is a town (belde) in the İdil District of Şırnak Province in Turkey. The settlement is populated by Kurds of the Domanan tribe and had a population of 4,065 in 2021. It is located in the historic region of Tur Abdin.

== History ==
ʿArban (today called Karalar) was historically inhabited by Syriac Orthodox Christians. There was a church of the Virgin and Mar Barsoum. The monk-priest Yeshu’, son of the priest Barṣoum of Arban, was a renowned calligrapher (fl. 1298). The village was attacked by Bakhti Kurds in 1453 alongside the neighbouring villages of Beth Sbirino, Bēth Isḥaq, and Midun, as per the account of the priest Addai of Basibrina in c. 1500 appended to the Chronography of Bar Hebraeus. Bakhti Kurds attacked ʿArban, as well as the villages of Bēth Isḥaq and Midun, again in 1457, resulting in the death of the priests Behnam and Addai, the deacon Abu Nasr, and 40 men whilst the women and children were taken captive.

In 1748, the episcopal residence of the Church of the Virgin and Mar Barsoum was renovated by Basil Denha Baltaji, the Maphrian of Tur Abdin, at which time the village was inhabited by 14 Syriac Orthodox families. In the Syriac Orthodox patriarchal register of dues of 1870, it was recorded that the village had 2 households, who paid 10 dues, and it did not have a church or a priest. ʿArban was later visited by Aphrem Barsoum in 1911 who noted only two Syriac Orthodox families and roughly 40 Muslim families resided there whilst the church lay in ruins. In 1914, the village was inhabited by 100 Syriacs, according to the list presented to the Paris Peace Conference by the Assyro-Chaldean delegation. There were 100 Syriac families in 1915. It was located in the kaza of Midyat.

== Bibliography ==
- Barsoum, Aphrem (2003). The Scattered Pearls: A History of Syriac Literature and Sciences. Translated by Matti Moosa (2nd ed.). Gorgias Press.
- Barsoum, Aphrem (2008). The History of Tur Abdin. Translated by Matti Moosa. Gorgias Press.
- Barsoum, Aphrem (2009). History of the Syriac Dioceses. Vol. 1. Translated by Matti Moosa. Gorgias Press.
- Baz, Ibrahim (2016). Şırnak aşiretleri ve kültürü (in Turkish). ISBN 9786058849631.
- Bcheiry, Iskandar (2009). The Syriac Orthodox Patriarchal Register of Dues of 1870: An Unpublished Historical Document from the Late Ottoman Period. Gorgias Press.
- Dinno, Khalid S. (2017). The Syrian Orthodox Christians in the Late Ottoman Period and Beyond: Crisis then Revival. Gorgias Press.
- Gaunt, David (2006). Massacres, Resistance, Protectors: Muslim-Christian Relations in Eastern Anatolia during World War I. Gorgias Press.
- Jongerden, Joost; Verheij, Jelle, eds. (2012). Social Relations in Ottoman Diyarbekir, 1870-1915. Brill.
- Keser-Kayaalp, Elif, ed. (January 2022). Syriac Architectural Heritage at Risk in TurʿAbdin (PDF).
