= Öğündük, İdil =

Village in Şırnak Province, Turkey

Öğündük
- Village
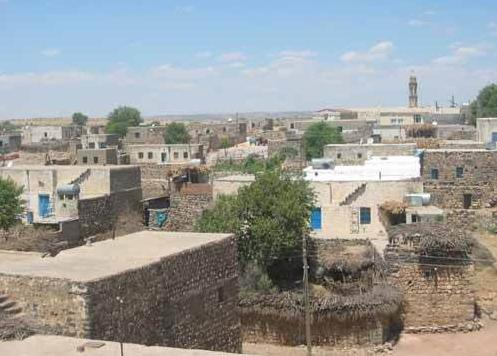
- Village

- Location within Turkey
- Coordinates: 37.338°N 41.746°E
- Country: Turkey
- Province: Şırnak
- District: İdil
- Population (2021): 367
- Time zone: UTC+3 (TRT)

Öğündük (Arabic: مدو; Syriac: ܡܝܕܘܢ, romanized: Midun) (Note: Alternatively transliterated as Midon, Mīdin, Midin, Midih, Medih, Miden, Meddé, Meddo, Meddū, Middo, Mindun, and Medon. Nisba: Midhōyo or Midwōyo locally.) is a village in the İdil District of Şırnak Province in Turkey. The village is populated by Syriacs and had a population of 367 in 2021. It is located in the historic region of Beth Zabday in Tur Abdin.

In the village, there is a church of Mar Jacob Malphono. (Note: In 1911, Aphrem Barsoum noted the church possessed numerous manuscripts including a Estrangelo service book written by the monk Simon of Hah in 1205, a volume by the monk Abraham Mutayra, written between 1460 and 1480, and a Beth Gazo by the monk Ṣaliba, written in 1478. Also known as the Church of Morī Ya'qūb Malfonō.) The village is known for its viticulture and wine-making.

== History ==
Midun (today called Öğündük) was probably named after the nearby Roman border fort of Mindon along the frontier with the Sasanian Empire in the Melabas Hills of Tur Abdin. (Note: Also spelt as Mindouos, Minduos, and Mindonos.) The efforts of the Roman general Belisarius to construct the fort in 528 prompted a battle in which the Romans were defeated as per Procopius' History of the Wars. It was attacked by Bakhti Kurds in 1453 alongside the neighbouring villages of Beth Sbirino, Bēth Isḥaq, and Araban, according to the account of the priest Addai of Basibrina in c. 1500 appended to the Chronography of Bar Hebraeus. Bakhti Kurds attacked Midun, as well as the villages of Bēth Isḥaq and Araban, again in 1457 and many of the villagers, including the priests Behnam and Malke, were killed.

It was looted by the emir Bidayn in 1714. The village was visited by Reverend George Percy Badger in December 1850 and noted it was served by one church and two priests, but it did not have a school. The Kurdish rebel Yezdanşêr attacked and looted the village in 1855. The Swiss orientalist Albert Socin noted that he was offered Assyrian cylinder seals at Midun in 1870. In the Syriac Orthodox patriarchal register of dues of 1870, it was recorded that the village had one hundred and thirty-two households, who paid six hundred and fifty-six dues, and was served by the Church of Morī Ya'qūb Malfonō and five priests. After the Hamidian massacres in the 1890s, Armenian refugees from Palu settled a section of the village called Sanhatkar. Midun was visited by the English traveller Mark Sykes in the early 20th century.

In 1914, Midun was inhabited by 1500 Syriacs, according to the list presented to the Paris Peace Conference by the Assyro-Chaldean delegation. It was located in the kaza of Midyat. There were 150 or 500 Syriac families in 1915 with thirty-one different clans and ten churches. They belonged to the Syriac Orthodox Church. Amidst the Sayfo, the village was surrounded and repeatedly attacked by neighbouring Kurdish tribes for a week. Although the Kurdish attacks were repulsed, the villagers opted to take refuge at nearby Beth Sbirino as Midun's location in the plains left it vulnerable. A number of villagers were killed as they travelled to Beth Sbirino; consequently, Kurds of the Domanan tribe seized their homes and settled at Midun. With the help of Chelebi Agha, some villagers were able to return after the war and came under the patronage of the Domanan tribe. In the aftermath of the Sheikh Said rebellion, 150 Syriacs were deported from Midyat, ‘Iwardo, Anhel, Mzizah and Midun, according to a letter in the Vatican Apostolic Archive.

In 1960, there were 873 residents. 1000 Christians in 140 families inhabited Midun in 1966 and spoke both Turoyo and Kurdish. A significant number of the village's Syriac population emigrated to Germany, Switzerland, and Belgium in the late 20th century. In 1990, the village was transferred from Mardin Province to Şırnak Province. On 9 January 1994, Melke Tok, priest of Midun, was abducted whilst en route from İdil to Bsorino. The priest was later released after negotiations, and attested that, whilst in captivity, he was buried alive and pressured into converting to Islam. In 2007, 257 Syriacs in 50 families populated Midun. A land dispute between two families resulted in one death and one injury at the village in April 2013. In 2014, a Syriac girl from Midun, who had been reportedly kidnapped by a Muslim man by force, was returned with the help of Agha Abdullah Taş. It was reported that vineyards and gardens in the village were burned in arson attacks in 2019. By 2022, the village was inhabited by under 400 people from 55 families.

== Demography ==
=== Families ===
The following is a list of the number of Syriac families that have inhabited Midun per year stated. Unless otherwise stated, all figures are from the list provided in The Syrian Orthodox Christians in the Late Ottoman Period and Beyond: Crisis then Revival, as noted in the bibliography below.

- 1915: 150/500 (Note: According to Courtois, there were 150 Syriac families at Midun in 1915, whilst Dinno and Gaunt both give 500.)
- 1966: 140
- 1978: 128
- 1979: 125
- 1981: 109
- 1987: 80
- 1995: 45
- 1997: 40
- 1999: 50
- 2007: 50

=== Population ===
Historical population

Year	Pop.	±% p.a.
1965	1,015	—
2007	314	−2.75%
2008	327	+4.14%
2009	315	−3.67%
2010	342	+8.57%
2011	343	+0.29%
2012	344	+0.29%

Year	Pop.	±% p.a.
2013	384	+11.63%
2014	376	−2.08%
2015	371	−1.33%
2016	351	−5.39%
2017	364	+3.70%
2018	343	−5.77%
2019	352	+2.62%

Year	Pop.	±% p.a.
2020	355	+0.85%
2021	367	+3.38%
2022	368	+0.27%
2023	354	−3.80%
2024	365	+3.11%

== Bibliography ==
- Atto, Naures (2011). Hostages in the Homeland, Orphans in the Diaspora: Identity Discourses Among the Assyrian/Syriac Elites in the European Diaspora (PDF). Leiden University Press.
- Badger, George Percy (1852). The Nestorians and Their Rituals: With the Narrative of a Mission to Mesopotamia and Coordistan in 1842-1844, and of a Late Visit to Those Countries in 1850; Also, Researches Into the Present Condition of the Syrian Jacobites, Papal Syrians, and Chaldeans, and an Inquiry Into the Religious Tenets of the Yezeedees. Vol. 1.
- BarAbraham, Abdulmesih (2021). "Returning Home: The Ambivalent Assyrian Experience in Turkey". Poligrafi. 26 (101/102): 153–176. doi:10.35469/poligrafi.2021.282.
- Barsoum, Aphrem (2003). The Scattered Pearls: A History of Syriac Literature and Sciences. Translated by Matti Moosa (2nd ed.). Gorgias Press.
- Barsoum, Aphrem (2008). The History of Tur Abdin. Translated by Matti Moosa. Gorgias Press.
- Baz, Ibrahim (2016). Şırnak aşiretleri ve kültürü (in Turkish). ISBN 9786058849631.
- Bcheiry, Iskandar (2009). The Syriac Orthodox Patriarchal Register of Dues of 1870: An Unpublished Historical Document from the Late Ottoman Period. Gorgias Press.
- Courtois, Sébastien de (2004). The Forgotten Genocide: Eastern Christians, The Last Arameans. Translated by Vincent Aurora. Gorgias Press.
- Courtois, Sébastien de (2013). "Tur Abdin : Réflexions sur l'état présent descommunautés syriaques du Sud-Est de la Turquie, mémoire, exils, retours". Cahier du Gremmamo (in French). 21: 113–150.
- Dinno, Khalid S. (2017). The Syrian Orthodox Christians in the Late Ottoman Period and Beyond: Crisis then Revival. Gorgias Press.
- Gaunt, David (2006). Massacres, Resistance, Protectors: Muslim-Christian Relations in Eastern Anatolia during World War I. Gorgias Press.
- Jongerden, Joost; Verheij, Jelle, eds. (2012). Social Relations in Ottoman Diyarbekir, 1870-1915. Brill.
- Keleş, Bahattin (2021). "Şırnak ve Çevresinde Yaşayan Müslim ve Gayrimüslim İlişkileri (Dini, Sosyal, Kültürel ve Ticari)" (PDF). Ekonomik, Siyasal ve Sosyal Boyutlarıyla Şırnak (in Turkish): 331–352.
- Keser-Kayaalp, Elif, ed. (January 2022). Syriac Architectural Heritage at Risk in TurʿAbdin (PDF).
- Lillington-Martin, Chris (2012). "Hard and Soft Power on the Eastern Frontier: a Roman Fortlet between Dara and Nisibis, Mesopotamia, Turkey, Prokopios' Mindouos?" (PDF). The Byzantinist (2): 4–5.
- Palmer, Andrew (1990). Monk and Mason on the Tigris Frontier: The Early History of Tur Abdin. Cambridge University Press.
- Radner, Karen (2006). "How to reach the Upper Tigris: The route through the Tur Abdin" (PDF). State Archives of Assyria Bulletin. 15: 273–305.
- Ritter, Hellmut (1967). Turoyo: Die Volkssprache der Syrischen Christen des Tur 'Abdin (in German). Vol. 1. Franz Steiner Verlag.
- Sykes, Mark (1915). The Caliphs' Last Heritage: A Short History of the Turkish Empire.
- Tan, Altan (2018). Turabidin'den Berriye'ye. Aşiretler - Dinler - Diller - Kültürler (in Turkish). Pak Ajans Yayincilik Turizm Ve Diş Ticaret Limited şirketi. ISBN 9789944360944.
