= Ganapati Chakraborty =

Indian Magician

- গণপতি চক্রবর্তী
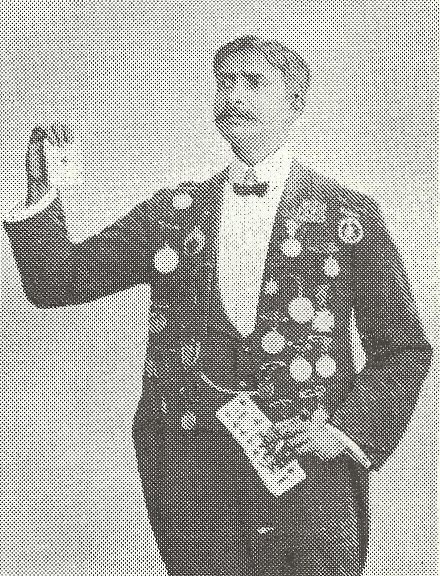
- Ganapati Chakraborty, showing his card tricks.
- Born: 1858; Salkia, Bengal, British India
- Died: 20 November 1939 (aged 80–81); Baranagar, Calcutta Bengal, British India
- Occupation: Magician
- Known for: Pioneer of modern magic in Bengal

Ganapati Chakraborty (Bengali: গণপতি চক্রবর্তী; 1858 – 20 November 1939) was a magician from Kolkata known for his mesmerizing tricks. He is considered to be the pioneer of modern magic in Bengal. He was the mentor of P. C. Sorcar and K Lal.

== Early life ==
Chakraborty belonged to a bengali brahmin zamindar family in the village of Chhatra near Serampore of Hooghly district. Due to some internal property conflicts, his father Mahendranath Chakraborty moved to Salkia before the birth of his son. In 1858, Ganapati was born in Salkia, a small town in Howrah district. In his childhood, he was not at all interested in studies. He was rather interested in singing and music.

At the age of 17 or 18, he left his home for the company of Hindu monks in order to learn esoteric knowledge and supernatural healing techniques. In this period he also came in touch with Khestrapal Basak, his first magic teacher and a few other magicians like, Jawaharlal Dhar.

== Career ==
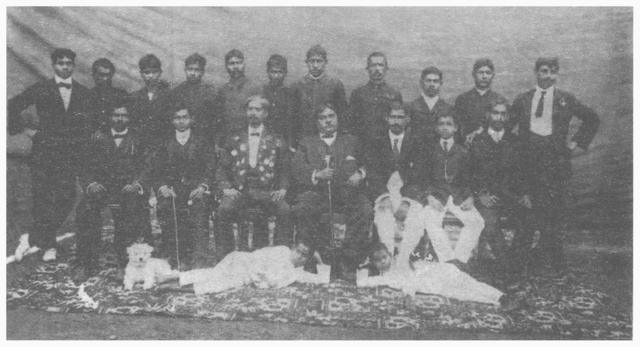
Ganapati Chakraborty (seated 3rd from left) with the members of Great Bengal Circus.

Chakraborty began his career at the Great Bengal Circus as comedian where he became famous through his fun tricks. Soon he began to show magic tricks. His two acts "Illusion Box" and "Illusion Tree" mesmerized the audience. During his 1908 Singapore tour with Priyanath Bose's Circus, his tricks with the cards and his vanishing act proved to be successful.

He developed his famous trick "Kangsha Karagar".

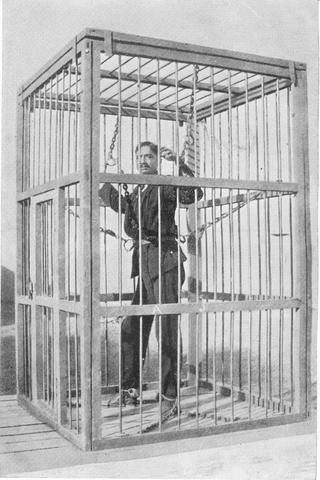
Ganapati showing Kangsha Karagar

The audience believed that he was endowed with supernatural powers. He earned the accolade of the best performer in Professor Bose's Circus. He was a man of short temper and unruly speech. Because of this nature, his colleagues bestowed upon him the sobriquet - Durbasa Muni.

Later, Chakraborty left Professor Bose's Circus and formed his own circus with a few performers from the former. He toured all over India and earned a great amount of fame and money.

== Later life ==
In his later life, Chakraborty built a house and a temple in Baranagar near Kolkata. His spent the rest of his life in spiritual pursuit. He penned in book in Bengali titled 'যাদুবিদ্যা'. He decided to donate this property to Sri Bhupendra Nath Roy Chowdhury.
