= Bosak =

Bosak is a Polish surname. Notable people with the surname include:

- Aleksander Bosak (born 1993), Polish racing driver
- Bogusław Bosak (born 1968), Polish politician
- John Bosak (1922–1994), American basketball player
- Jon Bosak (1924–2011), American engineer
- Krzysztof Bosak (born 1982), Polish politician
- Marcin Bosak (born 1979), Polish actor
- Meir Bosak (1912–1992), Polish-Israeli writer
- Tanja Bosak, Croatian-American experimental geobiologist

== See also ==
- Hauke-Bosak, a German-Polish family
- Józef Hauke-Bosak (1834–1871), Polish general
- Allan Boesak (born 1946), South African Dutch Reformed Church cleric
- Leonard Bosack (born 1952), co-founder of Cisco Systems
- Rudy Bozak (born 1982), American acoustics engineer
- Tyler Bozak (born 1986), Canadian ice hockey player
