= Nabagopal Mitra =

Indian playwright, poet and essayist (1840–1894)

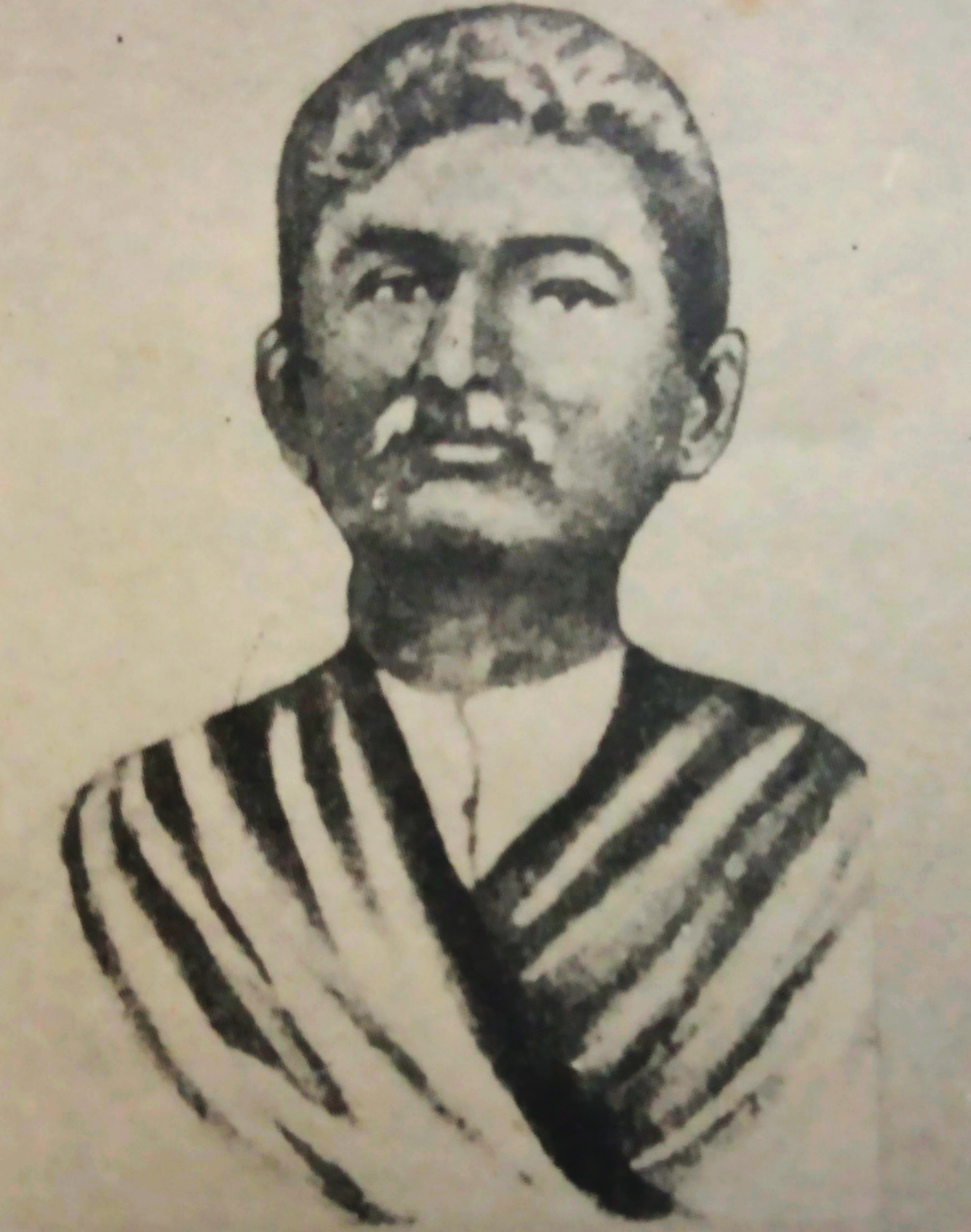
- Born: 1840; Calcutta, Bengal, British India
- Died: 9 February 1894 (aged 53–54)
- Occupations: Playwright, poet, essayist
- Organization: Hindu Mela
- Known for: founder of Hindu Mela

Nabagopal Mitra (Bengali: নবগোপাল মিত্র; 1840– 9 February 1894) was an Indian playwright, poet, essayist, patriot and one of the founding fathers of Hindu nationalism. He founded the Hindu Mela, which was inaugurated by Rajnarayan Basu, the pioneer institution behind the genesis of Hindu nationalism. Mitra also founded National Press, National Paper, National Society, National School, National Theatre, National Store, National Gymnasium and National Circus, earning him the sobriquet 'National Mitra'.

== Early life and influences ==
Nabagopal Mitra was born into a Bengali Hindu Kayastha family residing at Shankar Ghosh Lane, near Cornwallis Street in Kolkata. The year of his birth is disputed. While most historians agree he was born in 1840, in some sources his year of birth is recorded as 1841. From his early days he was very close to the Tagore family. Satyendranath Tagore was his classmate at the Hindu School. Gradually he became a close associate of Maharshi Debendranath Tagore, the leader of the Adi Brahmo Samaj and Tattwabodhini Sabha. Maharshi Debendranath was conservative in outlook in comparison to Keshab Chandra Sen's ultra-reformist stand. While Keshab Sen's philosophy was rooted in universalism, Maharshi Debedranath believed in reforms from a nationalist perspective. Nabagopal Mitra was heavily influenced by Maharshi Debendranath's thinking.

== Career ==
Nabagopal Mitra contended unity to be the fundamental criterion of nationalism and maintained that for the Hindus the basis of national unity was the Hindu religion. He also attempted a definition of the Hindu nation. According to him, "Hindu nationality .. is not confined to Bengal. It embraces all of Hindu names and Hindu faiths throughout the length and breadth of Hindustan; neither geographical position nor the language is counted as a disability. Hindus are destined to be a religious nation."

=== National Paper ===
In 1867, Nabagopal Mitra started an English weekly called National Paper. It was financed by Maharshi Debendranath Tagore. Even being the chief editor, Mitra purposefully never used grammatically correct English in his columns. If somebody pointed out any grammatical error, he used to justify it by explaining that as English was not his mother tongue, there is no harm if his article had any grammatical mistakes. According to him, it would be enough for someone if he is able to express himself in English, even though it may not be grammatically correct. Mitra's disdain and contempt for the language of the oppressors, essentially a trait inherited from his mentor Maharshi Debendranath Tagore, had to reflect in the media, and that remained a key deciding factor in the choice of the language when then weekly was launched.

=== Hindu Mela ===
In 1867, the National Paper published the Prospectus of a Society for the Promotion of National Feeling among the Educated Natives of Bengal by Rajnarayan Basu. Inspired by this booklet Nabagopal Mitra founded the Hindu Mela and the National Society in 1867. The mela was first known as the Jatiya Mela.

He requested Jyotirindranath Tagore to recite poems he composed at the Hindu Mela.

Young Narendranath, later known as Swami Vivekananda, used to visit the Hindu Mela.

=== National Gymnasium ===
At the Hindu Mela, Nabagopal Mitra laid much emphasis on gymnastics, wrestling and other traditional sports. In 1868, he opened a gymnastic school at his own residence, which he named the National Gymnasium. It became very popular and within a few years the school produced a number of physical education teachers. In the early 1870s the Lieutenant-Governor of Bengal, George Campbell, formulated a new educational policy. According to this new system, European style gymnasiums were set up in government schools and colleges. The gymnasium of Hindu College was equipped with parallel bars, horizontal bar, trapeze etc. The eldest son-in-law of Nabagopal Mitra was the instructor. Mitra, realising the usefulness and necessity of the European equipments, attempted to assimilate them within the Indian tradition. So, at the National Gymnasium, while the emphasis was more on physical exercises, wrestling, sword fighting and stick wielding, gradually modern equipments like bars and trapeze were introduced. Mitra even employed a British trainer to train the Bengali Hindu pupils in European style gymnastics.

Apart from the physical training, the institution was also instrumental in imparting the first lessons of nationalism to the future leaders of India. The foremost amongst them were Bipin Chandra Pal, Sundari Mohan Das and Raj Chandra Chaudhuri. Swami Vivekananda too in his early life had joined the National Gymnasium. Once a British sailor was hit by the toppled pole of trapeze at the gym and became unconscious. Many of the onlookers fled but the young Vivekananda and his friends took courage and nursed the sailor for a few days until he was revived.

=== National School ===
In 1872, Mitra founded the National School in the premises of the Calcutta Training Academy at 13, Cornwallis Street. The institution was set up for the cultivation arts, music and physical training. Courses included drawing, modelling, geometrical drawing, architectural drawing, engineering and surveying. Faculty included Shyamacharan Srimani, head teacher of the arts curriculum, and Kalidas Pal, the founder of India's first art journal Shilpa Puspanjali.

=== National Theatre ===
Nabagopal Mitra was instrumental behind the formation of the National Theatre in 1872. The name National Theatre was first suggested by Mitra. On 7 December 1873 the group staged their maiden play Nildarpan. The staging was hailed as 'an event of national importance' by Mitra in the National Paper.

=== National Circus ===
Mitra had utilized his entire assets for the establishment of the pioneering national institutions. Finally he mortgaged his residence in order to raise money for the National Circus, the pioneer institution that spread the culture of acrobatics, gymnastics and physical culture in India and acted as the precursor to the highly renowned and successful Great Bengal Circus founded by Priyanath Bose. Ram Chandra Chatterjee, the pioneer balloonist and parachutist began his career as an acrobat at the National Circus.

Mitra founded the National Circus in June, 1881 at 10–2, Cornwallis Street.
