= Rajnarayan Basu =

Indian writer (1826–1899)

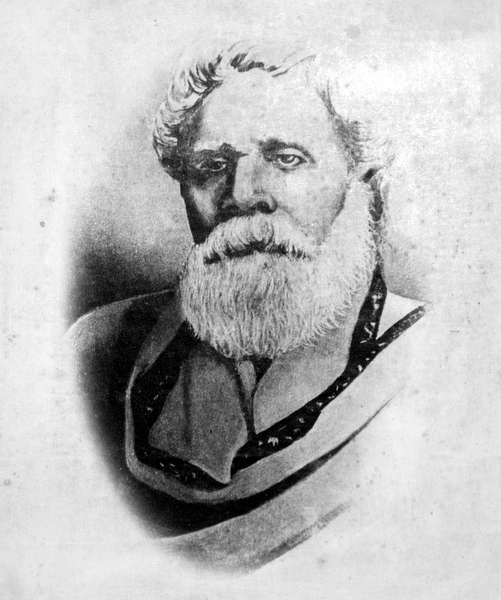
- Rajnarayan Basu, c. 1899
- Born: 7 September 1826; Boral, 24 Parganas, Bengal Presidency, British India
- Died: 18 September 1899 (aged 73); Midnapore, Bengal Presidency, British India
- Other name: Rishi Rajnarayan Basu Rajnaryan Bose
- Education: Hare School
- Occupation: Writer
- Spouses: Prasannamoyee Mitra; Nistarani Dutta
- Children: 1
- Relatives: Sri Aurobindo (grandson)

Rajnarayan Basu (1826–1899) was an Indian writer and intellectual of the Bengal Renaissance. He was born in Boral in 24 Parganas and studied at the Hare School and Hindu College, in Kolkata, Bengal. A monotheist at heart, Basu converted to the Brahmoism sect at the age of twenty. After retiring, he was given the honorary title of Rishi or sage. He was one of the best known prose writers in Bengali in the nineteenth century, writing often for the Tattwabodhini Patrika, a premier Brahmo journal. Due to his defence of Brahmoism, he was given the title "Grandfather of Indian Nationalism".

== Birth and early life ==
Basu was born on 7 September 1826, in a Bengali Kayastha family of the present-day South 24 Parganas district in West Bengal. The ancestral seat of the Basu family was Garh Gobindopur, Kolkata. His father Nanda Kishore Basu was a disciple of a Raja Ram Mohan Roy and later one of his secretaries. A bright student since childhood, Rajnarayan was brought to Calcutta (now Kolkata) and was admitted to Hare School Society's School (later known as Hare School) and studied there till the age of 14.

He married Prasannamoyee Mitra in 1843. After the death of his first wife, he married Nistarini Dutta, daughter of Abhayacharan Dutta.

== Career ==
Rajnarayan Basu was a rival of Michael Madhusudan Dutta, a prominent poet of the time, and the introducer of free verse in Bengali. Both were responsible for introducing classical Western elements into Bengali literature. He briefly tutored Rabindranath Tagore and spent three years translating the Upanishads into English on the earnest request and co-operation of Devendranath Tagore. As a member of Young Bengal, Rajnarayan Basu believed in "nation-building" at the grassroots level. To do his part, after teaching at Vidyasagar's Sanskrit College as the second master of the English Department, he moved to Midnapore to teach in the mofussil district town. He served as the headmaster of Midnapore Zilla School (later known as Midnapore Collegiate School) which was also the forerunner of Midnapore College.

== Work life in Midnapore ==
He had joined the school on 21 February 1851 preceded by Mr. Sinclare, during whose time the school lost its glory and was in a deplorable condition. Rajnarayan's first goal was to reestablish the school in the firmament of education. For that the following steps were taken:

1. He had abolished corporal punishment and introduced a friendly and cooperative atmosphere among the teachers and students to make education more interesting to them.
2. He had immense hatred against the well-practiced procedure of " committing to memory and vomiting to paper". He always followed the rule of teaching through interaction of both students and teachers. His eloquent speeches with humorous jokes gradually attracted even the heart of the most dull student in the class. He put stress on interrogative teaching, so that the fundamentals of the student becomes strong.
3. He understood that the students also need place for physical exercise and sports so that there mental and physical power can be properly manifested, so he made a Lawn Tennis Court and a Gymnasium in the school premises.
4. He wanted students to be educated in " Character Making Education", so he advised teachers to look after the moral development of the students, so that they can be " Man in a true sense."
5. He observed that students sitting in benches without back-support, cannot keep there back straight, so their attention span becomes shorter while studying. So he introduced sits with back-supports for the first time.
6. Being an active leader of Young Bengal, he was moved by the 'Academic Association' of Henry Louis Vivian Derozio. So he also introduced Debate Associations and Mutual Improvement Association in school level.

He also established the first arch of women education in Midnapore, the first girls school and a night school for educating the illiterates. He established a public library that is still in use, although now it is known as the Rishi Rajnarayan Basu Smriti Pathagar (Rishi Rajnaraya Basu Memorial Library) which is the oldest public library in West Bengal. He was the first person to suggest using Bengali at meetings of the Vangiya Sahitya Parishad (Bengali literature society). The Parishad was established to promote Bengali language literature yet ironically conducted meetings in English until Basu's request.

As an intellectual, he founded the Brahmo Samaj house and inaugurated Nabagopal Mitra's Hindu Mela, an organisation created to spread nationalist feelings among Indians. He was a member of the Indian Association and a member of a political group called the Sanjibani Sabha. He also lamented that there were no schools promoting the learning of Indian music among the middle-class and he himself started one in Midnapore. In 1868, he retired and moved to Deoghar where he spent the last years of his life. His grandson, eminent philosopher and freedom-fighter, Sri Aurobindo has inscribed his tribute to Rajnarayan in a beautiful sonnet.

My Grandfather—Rajnarayan Bose[1826–1899]

Not in annihilation lost, nor given.
To darkness art thou fled from us and light,
O strong and sentient spirit; no more heaven
of ancient joys, no silence eremite
received thee; but the omnipresent thought
of which thou was a part and earthly hour,
took back its gift. Into that splendour caught
thou hast no lost thy special brightness.Power
remains with thee and old genial force
unseen for blinding light; not darkly larks;
as when a sacred river in its course
dives into ocean, there its strength abides
Not less because with because with vastness wed and works
unnoticed in the grandeur of the tides.

— Sri Aurobindo

== Select bibliography ==
=== In Bengali ===
- Brahmo Sadhon (Serving Brahmoism)(1865)
- Dharmatatvo Dipika (The Light of Religious Theory) (1866–67)
- Hindudhormer srestotto (The superiority of Hinduism)(1873)
- Sekal aar eikaal (Then and now) (1873)
- Hindu othoba Presidency College-er itibritto (A history of the Hindu or Presidency College) (1876)
- Bibidho probondho (Various essays) (1882)
- Rajnarayan Basur Attocharit (Autobiography) (1909)

=== In English ===
- A defence of Brahmoism and the Brahmo Samaj (1863)
- Brahmic Advice, Caution, and Help (1869)
- The Adi Brahmo Samaj, its views and principles (1870)
- The Adi Brahmo Samaj as a Church (1873)
