= Biren Kumar Basak =

Indian handloom weaver

Biren Kumar Basak (born 16 May 1951) is an Indian handloom weaver from the Nadia district. He is the recipient of Padma Shri, the fourth highest civilian award of India.

== Career ==
Basak worked as a weaver at the age of 13 in Phulia. His family migrated to West Bengal from Tangail after the partition. Since 1970s, Basak weaves handloom sarees and used to sell it going door-to-door in Kolkata. He started his business with one Rs. In 2013 he received the National Award for craftsmanship. Some of his notable clients are Satyajit Ray, Hemanta Mukhopadhyay, Mamata Banerjee, Sourav Ganguly, Amjad Ali Khan, Lata Mangeshkar and Asha Bhosle.
