= Shyamala Goli =

Indian Educator

Syamala Goli
- Occupations: endurance swimmer, school teacher
- Known for: became only the second woman to cross the Palk Strait

Syamala Goli also referred to as Goli Syamala is an Indian endurance swimmer, Producer, Creative Director and Writer to the Animation Series and Movies. On 19 March 2021, she became the second Indian woman and second woman in the world after Bula Choudhury to have crossed the Palk Strait. She completed the feat at the age of 47.

== Career ==
She holds a postgraduate degree in sociology and initially pursued her career as an animation film producer and director after starting up an animation company in Hyderabad. After running the animation company for over ten years, she decided to quit it due to financial constraints.

Syamala also runs a play school Small Steps Preschool and Daycare in Hyderabad, Telangana. She pursued her interest in swimming at the age of 44 and joined a summer camp in 2016. She began her career in swimming in order to overcome from aquaphobia. She began her rollercoaster career in swimming by crossing Ganga Open Water in Patna up to a distance of 13 km in 2019.

In 2019, she swam across River Krishna in Vijayawada, River Ganga in Patna and River Hooghly in Kolkata. She also represented Telangana at the 2020 FINA World Masters Championship which was held in Guwanju, South Korea. She also competed at the 2019 National Open Water Ganga River Swimming Championships and also participated at the 2019 open-sea swimming championships which was held at Porbandar, Gujarat.

=== Palk Strait expedition ===
Syamala then applied to swim the 30 mile long Palk Strait in March 2020. She was all set and well prepared to swim across the Palk Strait but she had to postpone it due to the COVID-19 pandemic. On 8 March 2020, just a day prior to her scheduled expedition, Government of Sri Lanka implemented nationwide island wide lockdown.

However exactly a year later, Syamala began her attempt of swimming across the Palk Strait with the support of Indian High Commissioner and Sri Lanka High Commissioner. On 19 March 2021, Syamala successfully swam across Palk Strait for 13 hours and 43 minutes starting her journey at 4.15am from Talaimannar, Sri Lanka to Arichalmunai, India. She completed the journey at Indian local time 5.30 pm. She revealed that she faced very rough conditions in the Arabian sea difficulties during the last five hours of the expedition. During the expedition, she was accompanied by a 13-member crew including a doctor and observers from the Swimming Federation of India. She began her preparation and training to complete the Palk Strait feat in November 2020 after taking break due to the COVID-19 pandemic. She trained at SR Swimming Pool at Miyapur for the Palk Strait expedition.

She became only the second woman swimmer as well as thirteenth swimmer in the world to have crossed the Palk Strait and first person from Telangana to have achieved the milestone. It was reported that she was inspired to swim the Palk Strait after reading about the successful expeditions by swimmers when swimming across the English Channel.
