= Kurdish Institute of Brussels =

- Established: 1978
- Chair: Derwich Ferho
- Location: Brussels, Belgium
- Website: Kurdish Institute Brussels

The Kurdish Institute of Brussels (Kurdish: Enstîtuya Kurdî Ya Brukselê) is a non-profit organization, based in Brussels, Belgium, which aims for the integration of the Kurds and other minorities into the Belgian society, as well as to promote the Kurdish culture both in and out of Kurdistan.

== History ==
The Institute started out as the organization 'Têkoser', which was founded by a group of Belgian Kurds in 1978. Their main goal at the time was the integration of the Kurdish community in the Belgian society.

In 1989, the name of the organisation was changed to 'Kurdish Institute of Brussels', which has remained as such ever since. Since the establishment of the Kurdish Institute of Brussels, the organization has expanded its goals, beginning with a project in 1990 subsidized by the Flemish Ministry of Culture, called 'Host Country, My Home Country', in which socio-cultural trainings were provided. In 1998, the organization secured subsidies of the Flemish Ministry of Culture with as goal promoting further integration of the Kurdish community (as well as other minority groups) in Belgium, and the spreading of knowledge of Kurdish culture, history and language.

From 2004 on, the Institute's mission was expanded to include both its original goals and new goals, namely, securing the rights of linguistic, ethnic and religious minorities in Turkey, the Middle East and the Caucasus. In light of these new goals, the Institute founded a Kurdish Cultural Center in Tbilisi, Georgia. In March 2006, the Turkish Grey Wolves attacked the Kurdish Institute In Brussels just days after the parents of the Institutes chairman were murdered in Turkey.

== Activities ==
- Publication of The Kurds, a bi-monthly periodical in Dutch.
- Provision of social services for immigrants.
- Maintenance of the Institute's library, which contains publications, articles and books about the Kurds and the rest of the Middle East.
- Summer projects for children.
- Translation services.
- Language courses: French and Kurdish.
- Cultural programme: exhibitions, Kurdish films and plays, concerts, etc.
- Research, information and sensitization activities.

== Organization ==
The head of the Institute is Derwich Ferho, one of the original founders of the organization.

Next to the Flemish Ministry of Culture, the Institute is also recognized by the Walloon Ministry of culture; the service of Peoples Development in Flanders; Permanent Education in Wallonia; and the region of Brussels.

The Institute also frequently collaborates with universities and high schools, peace and human rights organizations, and other cultural organizations.

On 22 June 2012, the Institute, along with Senator Karel Vanlouwe, organized a conference at the Belgian Senate concerning the Kirkuk and the progression of Article 140, which was attended by a multitude of Kurdish leaders.

== Publications ==
In Dutch:

- Volksnationalisme, ook het Koerdische, is geen product van verbeelding maar representeert werkelijkheid, Hugo Van Rompaey, 2007.
- De Koerden. Essays over hun geschiedenis en cultuur, Knyaz Mirzoev, translated by Hugo Van Rompaey, 2006.
- Armoede in Brussel/Pauvreté à Bruxelles, Jan Béghin (red.), 2006.
- Kruitvat Kaukasus, Nik Vanderscheuren, Freddy De Pauw, Elmira Zeynalian (red.)., 2004.
- Mensen- en volkerenrechten in Syrië: De Koerdische kwestie, Wim Beelaert, 2004.
- De onderdrukking van de Koerden in Turkije, een misdaad?, Hugo Van Rompaey, 2003.
- De kwestie Iraaks Koerdistan. Derwich M. Ferho en Lieve Driesen (red.), 2002.
- De Koerden, tussen Europa en Turkije. Bert Cornillie en Paul Vanden Bavière (red.), 2001.
- De Koerdische Lente. Ik, peshmerga, ik geef mijn ziel, Ahmed Bamarni, 2000.
- De Onafhankelijkheidsdroom v/d Koerden, illusie of realiteit, Chris Kutschera, 1999.
- De Zaak Öcalan, Turkije, het Westen en de Koerden, Paul Vanden Bavière (red.) e.a., 1999.
- Dossier Koerdistan, 1ste druk 1988, 2de druk, 1991.
- Gevangenis Nr. 5, 11 jaar in de Turkse gevangenis, M. Zana, 1997.
- De Koerden en Zelfbeschikkingsrecht, Katy Verzelen, 1997.
- De Koerden, een volk op weg naar zelfstandigheid, Veerle Van Beeck, 1998.
- De Koerden in de voormalige Sovjet-Unie, H. Taels, 1997.
- Dr. A. Ghassemlou, man van vrede en dialoog, biography, 1997.
- Hêlîn rook naar boomhars, Susan Samanci, 1998.
- Ik was een kind in Koerdistan, Mahmut Baksi, 1998.
- Hêlîn, Mahmut Baksi, 1998.

Reports:

- Etnische en Religieuze Minderheden in Koerdistan, 2009.
- Toetredingsproces EU-Turkije: een stand van zaken, 2008.
- De Koerdische strijd vanuit vrouwenrechtenperspectief, 2007.
- De impact van repressieve regimes op de grootschalige exodus naar Europese landen, 2006.
- Mensenrechten in Iran, 2006.
- Eergerelateerd geweld, 2005.
- Mensen- en volkerenrechten in Iran, 2005.
- Het toetredingsproces van Turkije tot de EU en de Koerdische kwestie, 2004.
- De Koerden in Irak en de internationale houding, 2003.
- Turkije, klaar voor de Europese Unie? De Turkse realiteit getoetst aan de Criteria van Kopenhagen, Derwich M. Ferho en Lieve Driesen (red.), 2002.
- Ontheemde Koerden klem in Turkije, Carla Van Os, 2001.
- Een dam tegen de stuwdammen. Het GAP-project in vraag gesteld, 2000.

In English:

- Identity via satellite: a case study of the Kurdish satellite television station Medya TV, Andrea Allen Hickerson.
- Kurds Have the right to speak Kurdish, Hugo Van Rompaey.
- Kurdish nationalism in Mam u Zîn of A. Khanî, F. Shakely, 1992.
- The Kurdistan File, 1989.
- The Turkish Republic and the Kurdish Question, a tragic confrontation, E. Marescot.

In French:

- La République turque et la question, kurde : un face-à-face tragique, E.Marescot.
- Dijwar, un témoignage de ce qu’est leur vie, Orhan Miroglu.
- Hadés à l’oeuvre, Medeni Ferho.
- La République turque et la question kurde: un face-à-face tragique, Elisabeth Marescot.
- Les Kurdes: un peuple en quête d’Etat, Elisabeth Marescot, 2006.
- Les Kurdes dans l’ex-Union Sovietique, Herman Taels, 2003, 96 p.
- Le Genocide Kurde, Desmond Fernandes, 2002, 62 p.
- Costumes et Tapis Kurdes, J.M.C. & P.J., 1995, 96 p.
- Dossier Kurdistan, 1992, 138 p.
- La Turquie, l’Europe et les Kurdes, Paul Vanden Bavière, 2005.

Analyses:

- L’Iran et la question des minorités, Soheila Ghaderi-Mameli, 2006.
- Les Kurdes en Iran, jadis et maintenant, Chris Kutchera, 2006.
- La communauté Iranienne en Belgique, Anwar Mir Sattari, 2006.
- Situation actuelle de la femme en Iran, Françoise Brie, 2006.
- Quand les Scythes quittèrent les steppes d’Asie centrale!, Elisabeth Marescot, 2006.
- Saleh ed-din (Saladin), le Sultan Kurde et de sa dynastie, les Ayyubides, E. Marescot, 2006.
- Les Croisades racontées par les Syriaques, Elisabeth Marescot, 2006.
- Le peuple Araméo-Assyro Chaldéo-Syriaque, Elisabeth Marescot, 2006.
- Le Zoroastrisme, Elisabeth Marescot, 2006.
- Ibn Sina (980-1037);Médecin – philosophe – homme de lettres, Elisabeth Marescot, 2006.
- Le manichéisme: de Ctésiphon à Montségur, Elisabeth Marescot, 2006.

In Kurdish:

- Serê Sevê Çîrokek, Sahredariya Sûrê, Avrêl 2006, qediya (b.a. EKB).
- Serê Sevê Çîrokek, Sahredariya Sûrê, Gulan 2006, qediya (b.a. EKB).
- Binêr... Ez Mezin dibim, agahdarî li ser mezinbûna zarokan ji 0 heta 3 saliya wan, 1984.
- Jana Heft Salan, Sahînê B. Sorekli, helbest, 1990.
- Memê û Eysê, Taharê Biro, sano, 1991.
- Kurdên Tirkiyê di dema herî nuh da, M. A. Hasratyan, dîrok, 1994.
- Dîroka Kurdistan bi Kurtebîrî, E. Cemîl Pasa, dîrok, 1995.
- Hey Gerilla, Medeni Ferho, helbest, 1994, (b.a. EKB).
- Dîwan 3, Feqir Ahmed, helbest, 1997.
- Digirê, Mihemed Abbas, helbest, 1998.
- Letîf Helmet, Xelîl Dihoki, helbest, 1998.
- Koerdisch - Turks, Derwich M. Ferho.
- Dengê Roja Dîl, Derwich M. Ferho, helbest, 1985, (b.a. EKB).
- Evîna Reben, Derwich M. Ferho, helb., (b.a. EKB).
- Hêvî û Jiyan, Derwich M., Ferho helbest, 1999, (b.a. EKB).
- Xaltîka Zeyno, Medenî Ferho, roman, (b.a. EKB).
- Marê di Tûr de, Medenî Ferho, roman, 1999, (b.a. EKB).
- Bîr û Raman, Rojan Hazim, 2001.
- Paseroj, Rojan Hazim, 2002.
- Zîlan, agir û stranên jiyanê, Medenî Ferho, helbest, 1999, (b.a. EKB).
- Sevên Zivistanî û Melekî Tawus, Abbas Abbas, sano, 1996, (b.a. EKB).
- Ji Meresê xeberek hat, Alî Alxasî.

In Turkish:

- Bize Bir Felsefe Lazım, S. Ciziri, 1999.
- Kawa efsanesî, Nêrgîza Tori.
- Muhtasar Hayatım, E.Cemîl Pasa, 1991.
- Kurdistana Sevgiler, Rojan Hazim, 2001.
- Eski Sovyetler Birliginde Kürtler, H.Taels,(b.a. EKB).

== See also ==
- Kurdish people
- Kurdish diaspora
