= Hindu Mela =

Former political and cultural festival in Kolkata

The Hindu Mela (transl. Hindu Fair) was an annual political and cultural festival (mela) that took place in India during the late 19th century. Initially established in 1867 by Nabagopal Mitra, Rajnarayan Basu, and Manomohan Bose as the Chaitra Mela, it was intended to establish unity amongst Indians. It was known for promoting sports, indigenous arts and crafts, nationalistic poetry, and songs. The mela met regularly until 1880, after which it lost its importance due to the establishment of other institutions such as the Indian National Congress.

== History ==
=== Founding and objectives ===
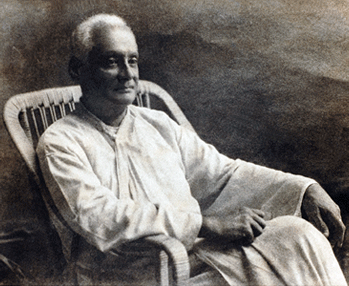
Ganendranath Tagore, the first secretary of the Hindu Mela

In 1867, the National Paper published the Prospectus of a Society for the Promotion of National Feeling among the Educated Natives of Bengal by Rajnarayan Basu. Inspired by this booklet, Nabagopal Mitra and Debendranath Tagore collaborated with Basu and Manomohan Bose to found the Hindu mela in 1867. The mela was initially called the Chaitra Mela because it was celebrated on the last day of Chaitra, the last month of the Bengali calendar. The founding of the mela was financially supported by the Tagore family of Jorashako, some of whom were involved in organising and promoting the event. Certain members of the family recited poetry and composed songs for the mela.

The mela was initially led by Nabagopal Mitra as the Assistant Secretary and Ganendranath Tagore, Debendranath's first son, as the Secretary. After Ganendranath died at the age of 28, his nephew Dwijendranath Tagore took over the post of secretary during the third session, helping the mela run for four more years. During these four years, Dwijendranath and Mishra are credited with having established the Hindu Mela as a national event. Due to the annual nature of the event, a National Society was also established during this time to further the mela's goals during the period when the mela was not in session.

During the second meeting of the Hindu mela in 1878, Mishra and Gaganendranath Tagore had laid out six objectives that the mela would aim to achieve. A primary objective was the creation of a national council that would promote unity and brotherhood amongst Indians. The council was further tasked with uplifting the status of Indians amongst the colonial population and decreasing Indian's reliance on British services and products. To further this, the organisers established the practice of preparing an annual report regarding the council's work that was to be presented every year at the mela. Amongst the other objectives laid out during this event was the promotion of indigenous education, arts, crafts, and sports; support was to be provided for anyone who was working towards this goal. To further these objectives, six committees were set up in collaboration with the leaders of the Hindu society.

=== Later years ===
Satyendranath Tagore, Debendranath's second son, was also deeply associated with the Hindu Mela. He was not present for the founding session in April 1867 as he was in western India, but he was present for the second session. He composed a song, "mile sabe Bharat santan, ektan gaho gaan" (unite, India's children, sing in unison), which was hailed as the first national anthem of India. Rabindranath Tagore, Satyendranath's youngest sibling, became deeply involved in the mela. At the age of 15, one of his first contributions to the mela was a poem titled "A Gift to the Hindu Mela," which he wrote and recited during its ninth session. The poem was subsequently circulated in the Amrita Bazar Patrika and is considered to be one of the first poems that was published under Tagore's name.

During his association with the Hindu mela, Rabindranath was exposed to anti-British sentiments for the first time. On the tenth anniversary of the mela, Rabindranath recited a poem titled "Dillir Durbar" where he attacked the then newly appointed Viceroy Lord Lytton's decision to hold a lavish Durbar in Delhi. He was particularly dissatisfied by the durbar's decision to proclaim Queen Victoria as the "Empress of India" while famine raged across the country. The poem denounced this action and called for his fellow Indians to "sing a different tune". This was among his first acts of publicly attacking the British Raj.

Several organisers of the Hindu mela came together to form a secret society, the Sanjivani Sabha, which manufactured swadeshi matchsticks and cloth woven in swadeshi looms. The Hindu mela also provided considerable exposure to indigenous physical sports. In the first session of the mela, renowned wrestlers in Calcutta were invited and awarded medals. In the following session, competitions for indigenous physical sports such as wrestling and lathi-play, a game that revolved around dueling with bamboo sticks, were organised. Various displays of Indian martial arts and survival techniques were also prominently featured at the mela. As a result of this exposure, many schools introduced physical education into their curriculum. Physical education was also included into the syllabus of Indian Civil Service examinations.
