= Süleyman Başak =

Turkish-Cypriot economist (born c.1964)

- Born: c. 1964 (age 61–62)
- Occupation: Economist

Academic background
- Education: University College London & Carnegie Mellon University

Academic work
- Discipline: Economics
- Institutions: University of Pennsylvania

Süleyman Başak (born c. 1964) is a Turkish-Cypriot financial economist. He is a Professor at the Institute of Finance and Accounting of the London Business School, an MBA-granting part of the University of London. He has previously taught at the Wharton School of the University of Pennsylvania until June 30, 2000, where he received the David W. Hauck Award for Outstanding Teaching in 1997, and an honourable mention in 1998 and 1999 for the Geewax, Terker Prize for Investment Research.

== Education ==
Başak received his B.S. degree in Civil engineering from University College London and a master's degree in the same subject from Carnegie Mellon University, This was followed by an M.S. and Ph.D. in Financial economics from Carnegie Mellon. His dissertation won him the Alexander Henderson Award for excellence in economics, an award also won by Nobel Laureates Oliver Williamson, Dale T. Mortensen, Finn Kydland and Edward Prescott.

== Career ==
He has been the recipient of a Fulbright scholarship, and a William Larimer Mellon Fellowship. He holds research grants from the Economic & Social Research Council, U.K., and the Q-Group, Institute for Quantitative Research in Finance, U.S.

He is Associate Editor of the journals Management Science^{ISSN 0025-1909} and Review of Finance^{ISSN 1572-3097}.

== Selected publications ==
Başak has published over 17 peer-reviewed papers. His most cited, both dealing with financial economics, are

- Basak, S.; Shapiro, A. (2001). "Value-at-risk-based risk management: Optimal policies and asset prices". Review of Financial Studies. 14 (2): 371–405. doi:10.1093/rfs/14.2.371. S2CID 18763048.
- Basak, S.; Cuoco, D. (1998). "An equilibrium model with restricted stock market participation". Review of Financial Studies. 11 (2): 309–341. doi:10.1093/rfs/11.2.309.
