= Shyamal Bagchee =

Indian-born Canadian poet, retired university teacher, scholar, and photographer

- Born: 1945 (age 80–81); Kolkata, India
- Occupations: Poet; academic; critic

Academic background
- Education: York University, Toronto.

Academic work
- Discipline: English literature; literary theory; cultural studies
- Institutions: University of Alberta

Shyamal Bagchee (born 1945) is an Indo-Canadian poet, scholar, and a serious photographer. He is particularly interested in critical theory, poetry and poetics, eroticism, and their socio-cultural and philosophical underpinnings. Shyamal Bagchee earned a BA degree with Honours in 1965 from University of Delhi and two years later he received a Master of Arts in English and American literature from Visvabharati University followed by another MA from McMaster University, Canada. In 1981 Bagchee earned his doctoral degree from York University in Toronto before joining University of Alberta to teach English literature, Literary Theory (in particular Postmodernism and Postmodernity) and Cultural Studies. He moved rapidly through academic ranks: 1982 Assistant Professor, 1985 Associate Professor, 1991 Full Professor, 2015 Professor Emeritus—to date).

== History ==
While still a graduate student, Bagchee launched the refereed academic journal: Yeats Eliot Review. YER drew original critical essays and reviews by leading Modernist scholars from across the world. In 1989 the journal moved to a US university.

During his years in Toronto, Bagchee was fortunate to be closely mentored by Sir William Empson.

Bagchee has published scholarly papers on a wide variety of literary topics and authors as diverse as Cyril Tourneur, Thomas Dekker, Henry King, romantic theories, William Blake, symbolism, Thomas Carlyle, Walter Pater, 19th and 20th Century American Studies, cultural studies, aesthetics, philosophy of ethics, socialism, early and later modernism, W.B. Yeats, T. S. Eliot, Virginia Woolf, Yvor Winters, on Canadian poetry by Al Purdy, P.K. Page and Irving Layton, on postmodernism, post-structuralism, deconstruction, influence studies, eroticism, and pornography. He has edited several volumes of original essays: T.S. Eliot Annual No. 1 (Macmillan, UK, 1989), A Voice Descanting: T.S. Eliot Centennial Essays (Palgrave Macmillan, UK, 1990, and St. Martin's Press, USA, 1990), Perspectives on O’Neill (ELS Monographs, Univ. of Victoria, 1988), and with Elisabeth Daumer, International Reception of T.S. Eliot (Continuum/Bloomsbury, UK, 2007).

In 1997 on the 50th anniversary of Canadian Citizenship Act of 1947, Bagchee was awarded a Distinguished New Canadian Award for Creative Arts.

In 1988 Bagchee was invited to deliver the Eliot Centennial Address at University of Arkansas where he was also awarded a special Eliot Centennial Citation. Two years later he presented The T.S. Eliot Society of America's 11th Eliot Memorial Lecture ] in the poet's city of birth, St. Louis, Missouri. In 2001 Bagchee was elected President of The T.S. Eliot Society of America (now The International T.S. Eliot Society) for three years. Other positions held by him include chair, board of directors of University of Alberta Press, and a director of Shastri Indo-Canadian Institute. He also served on the institute's executive committee, and as chair of its Canadian Studies Committee.

Bagchee's has published two volumes of his verse: Gabardine and Other Poems (Toronto: TSAR Books, 2006), and A Scrupulous Meanness and Other Poems (Ottawa: Buschek Books, 2007). A third compilation of poems tentatively titled Zero ZonesNightsoil, is currently in press..
