= Jon Bosak =

Creator of the XML specification

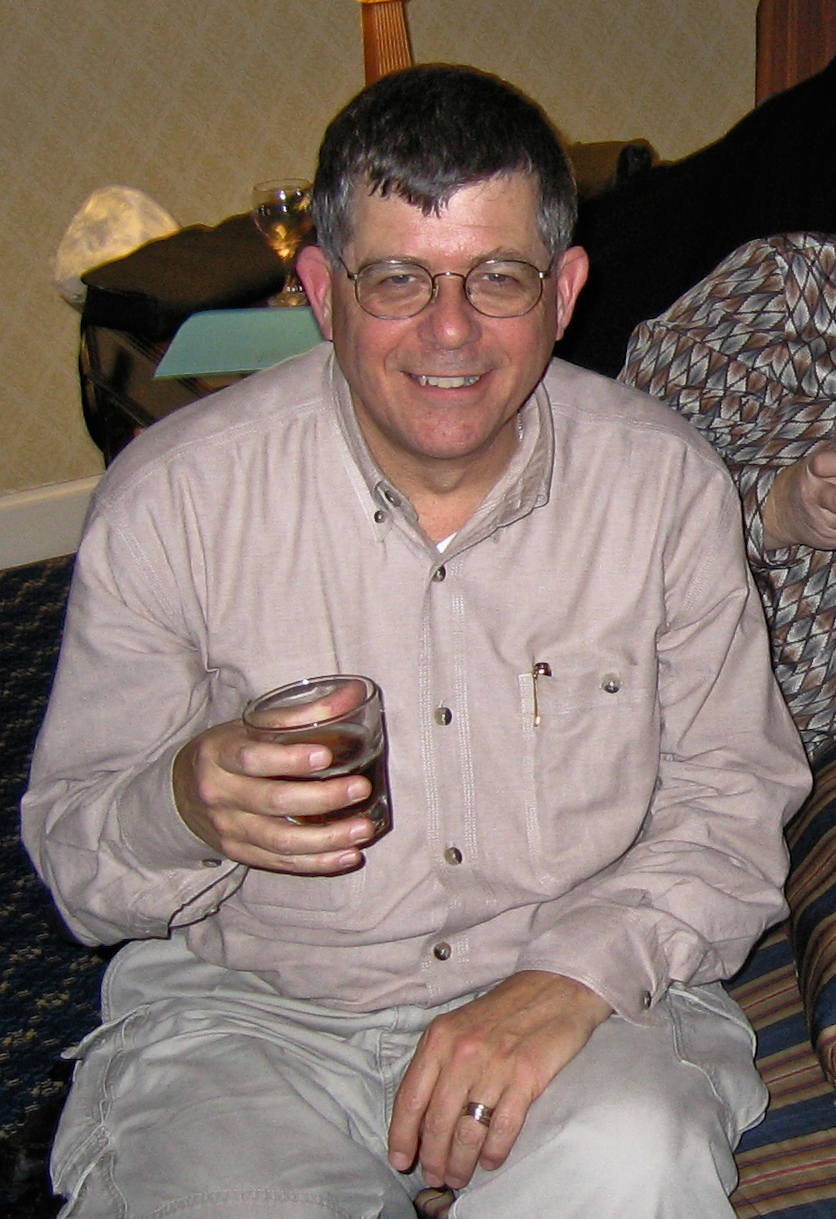
Jon Bosak

Jon Bosak led the creation of the XML specification at the W3C. From 1996–2008, he worked for Sun Microsystems.

== XML ==
Tim Bray, who was one of the editors of the XML specification, has this to say in his note on Bosak in his annotated version of the specification:

"Jon Bosak is the single person without whose efforts XML would most likely have failed to happen. He had come to appreciate the power and flexibility of SGML in his days running Novell's (excellent) on-line documentation repository at http://www.novell.com, and had acquired a conviction that HTML was not a suitable base on which to build the next layer of Web infrastructure. Jon's stewardship of the XML process has been marked by a combination of deft political maneuvering with steadfast insistence on the principle of doing things based on principle, not expediency."

In a 1999 posting to the xml-dev mailing list, Bray writes:

"It is to Jon Bosak's immense credit that he (like many of us) not only saw the need for simplification but (unlike anyone else) went and hounded the W3C until it became less trouble for them to give him his committee than to keep on saying SGML was irrelevant."

When he stepped down from the W3C XML Coordination Group in 2000, Jon Bosak was given the unusual recognition of having a formal identifier reserved for him:

In appreciation for his vision and leadership and dedication the W3C XML Plenary on this 10th day of February, 2000 reserves for Jon Bosak in perpetuity the XML name "xml:Father".

== The Universal Business Language ==
In 2001, Bosak organized the OASIS Universal Business Language Technical Committee to create standard formats for basic electronic business documents. He led the UBL TC through the completion of UBL 2.1 in November 2013 and continues to serve on the Committee as Secretary. UBL was approved for use in European public sector procurement by decision of the European Commission dated 31 October 2014 and published as an International Standard, ISO/IEC 19845:2015, on 15 December 2015.

== Metrological Studies ==
Bosak is author of the book The Old Measure: An Inquiry into the Origins of the U.S. Customary System of Weights and Measures. (ISBN 978-0-615-37626-4, 2010) and the article "Canonical grain weights as a key to ancient systems of weights and measures" (PDF). (latest version 19 April 2014)

== Bob Bosak ==
Jon Bosak's father, Robert Bosak (1925–1987), began the family's long involvement in the computer industry in 1947 when he went to work on the first computer on the west coast of the US. He joined RAND in 1948 to work on analysis and programming of scientific problems. In 1951, he joined Lockheed Aircraft Corporation, where he organized and directed the Mathematical Analysis Group. For a short time after his divorce in the 1950s, he shared an apartment with Bob Bemer, "the Father of ASCII."

Bob Bosak returned to RAND in 1956 to become head of programming for the Semi Automatic Ground Environment (SAGE), the automated NORAD system that controlled US air defenses from 1959 to 1983 and strongly influenced the design of modern air traffic control systems. He was one of the designers of JOVIAL and principal author of the seminal paper An Information Algebra.
