= Shyamal Sinha =

Indian cricketer and coach (1930–1963)

Personal information
- Born: 10 July 1930; Patna, Bihar, British India
- Died: 7 June 1963 (aged 32); Patna, Bihar, India
- Role: Bowler

Domestic team information
- Years: Team
- 1951–52 to 1962–63: Bihar

Career statistics
Competition	First-class
Matches	17
Runs scored	126
Batting average	6.00
100s/50s	0/0
Top score	34 not out
Balls bowled	1911
Wickets	21
Bowling average	42.23
5 wickets in innings	0
10 wickets in match	0
Best bowling	4/82
Catches/stumpings	6/–
- Source: Cricket Archive, 21 January 2015

Shyamal Sinha, also known as Shyamlal Sinha, (10 July 1930 – 7 June 1963) was an Indian first-class cricketer and cricket coach.

Sinha played regularly for Bihar from 1951–52 to 1962–63 as a bowler. His best figures were 4 for 82 off 29 overs against Bengal in 1958–59. His highest score was 34 not out at number nine, the second-top score of the innings, in a close victory over Orissa in 1960–61.

While teaching at his alma mater, Patna University, in the 1950s, he and some of his colleagues, including Sujit Mukherjee, began informally coaching local boys and promoting cricket in Patna. Later, Sinha was appointed state cricket coach by the Bihar government, a position he held until his early death in June 1963. The cricket competition among Bihar schools has since been held for the Shyamal Sinha Memorial Trophy.
