= Başak =

Başak is a feminine given name of Turkish origin. It means "ear of grain", referring to the part of a cereal plant that contains the seeds.

== People ==
=== Given name ===
- Başak Eraydın (born 1994), Turkish tennis player
- Başak Ersoy (born 1991), Turkish women's footballer
- Başak Gümülcinelioğlu (born 1991), Turkish actress
- Başak Gündoğdu (born 1992), Turkish women's footballer
- Başak İçinözbebek (born 1994), Turkish women's footballer
- İlkay Başak Uysal (born 1992), Turkish scientist specializing in women’s sexual and reproductive health and women's hormone health.
- Başak Köklükaya (born 1974), Turkish actress
- Başak Parlak (born 1989), Turkish actress and model
- Başak Senova (born 1970), Turkish curator

=== Surname ===
- Chris Başak (born 1978), American baseball player
- Rasim Başak (born 1980), Azerbaijani-Turkish basketball player
- Süleyman Başak, Turkish Cypriot financial economist
