= Meir Bosak =

Israeli writer (1912–1992)

- מאיר בוסאק
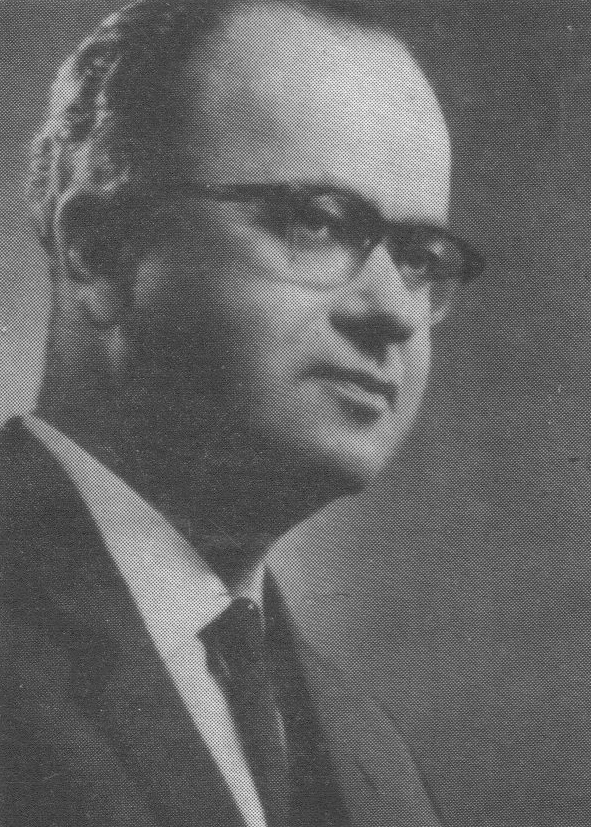
- Born: 21 May 1912; Kraków, Austria-Hungary
- Died: 20 November 1992 (aged 80); Israel
- Occupations: Historian; poet

Meir Bosak (Hebrew: מאיר בוסאק; 21 May 1912 – 20 November 1992) was a Polish-born Israeli historian and writer.

== Biography ==
Bosak was born in Kraków, Poland, in 1912. As a youth, he studied in Warsaw.

From 1929, Bosak began publishing articles in Polish and in Hebrew on the history of Polish Jewry. He also wrote essays on Hebrew literature as well as stories and poems.

During World War II, Bosak first lived in the Kraków Ghetto and subsequently was sent to the Płaszów concentration camp. Bosak survived the war due to the efforts of Oskar Schindler. Following the war, Bosak emigrated to Israel settling in Tel Aviv.

== Published works ==
Bosak's published works include:

- Be-Nogah ha-Seneh (1933)
- Ve-Attah Eini Ra'atekha (1957)
- Ba-Rikkud ke-Neged ha-Levanah (1960)
- Aḥar Esrim Shanah (1963)
- Mul Ḥalal u-Demamah (1966)
- Sulam ve-Rosho (1978)
- Ẓamarot bi-Tefillah (1984)
- Rak Demamah po Titpalal (1990)
- Mul Sha'ar ha-Raḥamim (1995)
- Shorashim ve-Ẓamarot (1990)
