= Birendra Basak =

Indian water polo player

Personal information
- Full name: Birendra Nath Basak
- Nationality: Indian
- Born: 1 February 1912

Sport
- Sport: Water polo

Birendra Basak (born 1 February 1912, date of death unknown) was an Indian water polo player. He competed in the men's tournament at the 1952 Summer Olympics.
