= Percival G. Spencer =

British aeronaut 1864–1913

Percival Green Spencer
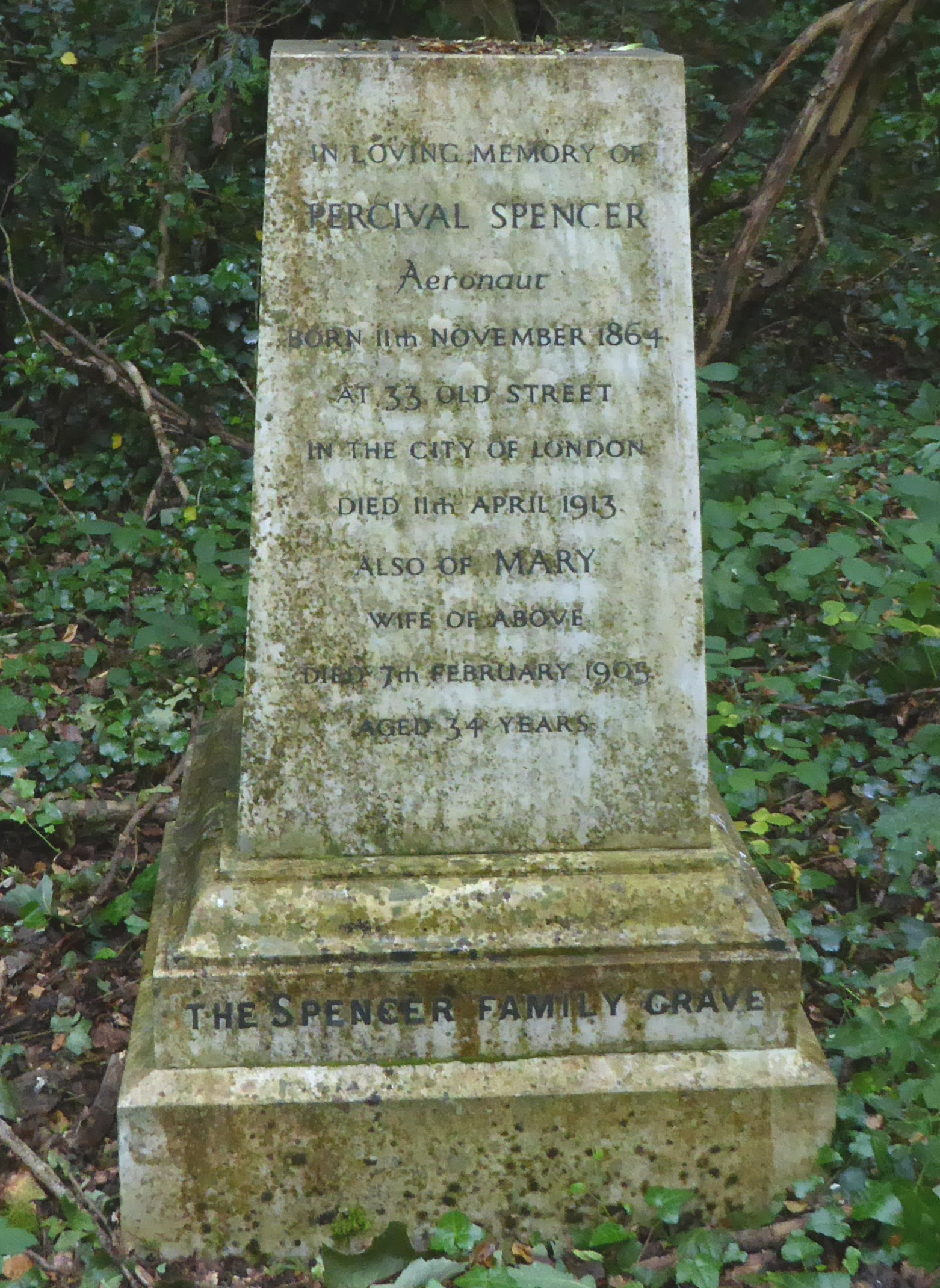
- Percival Spencer gravestone
- Born: 11 November 1864; Islington, London
- Died: 11 April 1913 (aged 48); Highbury, London
- Occupation: Manager of balloon manufacturer
- Known for: Pioneer aviator
- Spouse: Mary Ann Coleman
- Children: Four daughters and one son

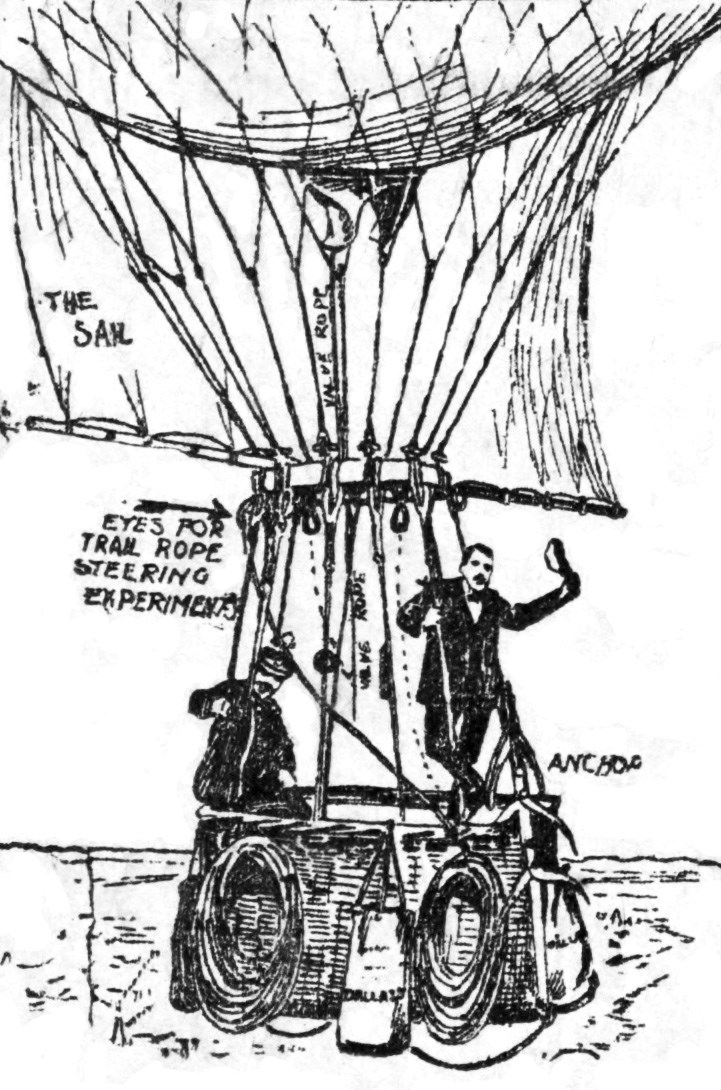
The illustration for the successful crossing of the English Channel in December 1898 (New York Journal)

Percival Green Spencer (11 November 1864, Islington, London – 11 April 1913, Highbury, London) was a British pioneering balloonist and parachutist.

Spencer was part of the third generation of a family of professional balloonists. He was the eldest son of Charles Green Spencer (1837–1890), who was the son of Edward Spencer (1799–1849). Edward Spencer, a solicitor, was a friend and trusted assistant of the noted balloonist Charles Green, ascending with Green 27 times and soloing 40 times. Charles Spencer founded the balloon manufacturing firm of C. G. Spencer & Sons. At least five of Percival's siblings also followed the family profession. He and his brothers Arthur (1866–1940) and Stanley (1868–1906) were considered the leading authorities on ballooning.

Percival first ascended in a balloon at the age of eight with his father over the Crystal Palace. In a November 1909 letter to the editor of Flight magazine, he claimed to have made eight "Cross-Sea Balloon Voyages", often with passengers. His February 1898 crossing from England to France, accompanied by Pearson's Magazine journalist George Griffith, was reported in The New York Times.

On 19 March 1889, he made the first successful balloon flight in India. Ram Chandra Chatterjee took lessons from him and flew with him on 10 April, becoming the first Indian aeronaut to fly solo later that same month.

The following September 14, Spencer was the first to parachute safely in Ireland, at Drumcondra in Dublin. He jumped from two thousand feet in front of 25,000 people at 6.30 pm.

== Family life ==
Spencer married Mary Anne Coleman in 1892. They had four daughters and a son. His wife died in 1905. Spencer died at his home in Aberdeen Park, Highbury on 11 April 1913, after contracting bronchial pneumonia.
