= Shyamal Bashak =

Bangladeshi artist

Shyamal Krishna Bashak
- শ্যামল কৃষ্ণ বসাক
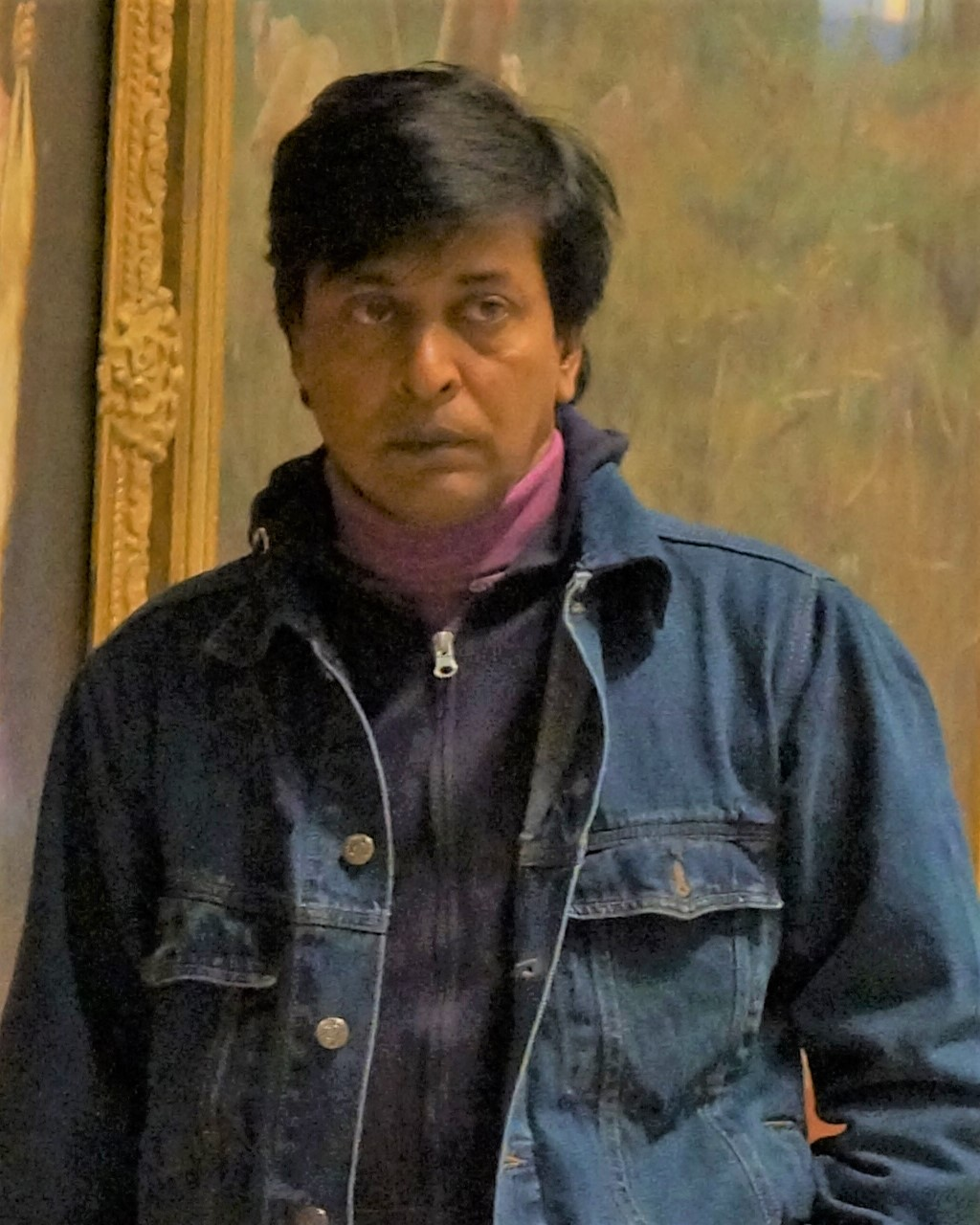
- Bashak at the Art Gallery of Windsor in 2015
- Born: January 1, 1967 (age 59); Mymensingh, East Pakistan
- Education: Master of Fine Arts
- Alma mater: Faculty of Fine Arts, University of Dhaka
- Known for: sculpture, installation art, painting, printmaking, graphic design, set design
- Notable work: Science Park
- Spouse: Gouri Bashak
- Awards: DUCSU Ekushey Padak 1992, PARICHARJA Award for excellence in poster design 1996, Bangladesh Book Publication Organization best book cover design & illustration 1985

Shyamal Krishna Bashak (Bengali: শ্যামল কৃষ্ণ বসাক; born January 1, 1967) is a Bangladeshi artist who served as senior artist cum audio-visual officer of the National Museum of Science and Technology in Bangladesh for 20 years, and was previously chief artist of daily newspaper Bhorer Kagoj.

== Early life and education ==
Born to Narayan Chandra Bashak, a prominent makeup artist in Mymensingh, a city in Mymensingh District in the central region of Bangladesh, Shyamal was instructed in the arts from a young age. He would go on to receive his Masters of Fine Arts in printmaking from the Faculty of Fine Arts, University of Dhaka where he would attract attention by receiving the Dhaka University Central Student's Union's Ekushey Padak for his design work commemorating the Language Movement.

== Career ==
After completing his master's degree, Bashak would participate in both group and solo exhibitions including "Life Line & Light" a three-man exhibition at the Bangladesh National Museum, and "Save Human" a set of 4 exhibitions to raise funds for flood relief in Bangladesh. He would later be recruited by Bhorer Kagoj to serve as chief artist, until he joined Bangladesh's National Museum of Science and Technology as their senior artist and audio-visual officer where he would spend two decades making significant improvements to the galleries and various displays, carrying out the design and implementation of "Science Park" while still working on independent exhibitions throughout Bangladesh and internationally.

== Attacks ==
It was reported that on May 29, 2013, Bashak was assaulted by Islamic fundamentalist co-workers in attempt to purge prominent Hindus from the National Science Museum. The severity of the assault and his prominence led to the attack being covered across Bangladesh, which led to further attempts on his life including a shooting in December 2013 which, while not killing Bashak resulted in him crashing his motorcycle and receiving serious injuries, and a firebombing of his home a year later.
