= Priyanath Bose =

Indian businessman

Priyanath Bose প্রিয়নাথ বসু
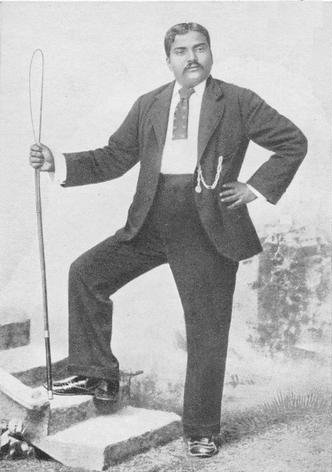
- Priyanath Bose
- Born: 1865; Chhota Jagulia, Calcutta, 24 Parganas, Bengal, British Raj
- Died: 21 May 1920 (aged 55); Singapore, Straits Settlements, British Malaya
- Occupations: Equestrian and entrepreneur
- Organization: Great Bengal circus (founder)
- Father: Manomohan Bose

Priyanath Bose (c. 1865 – 21 May 1920) also known as Professor Bose was an Indian circus performer and entrepreneur. In 1887 he founded The Great Bengal Circus with an all-Indian team and toured Bengal, India and South East Asia. He is considered to be one the pioneers of circus in India.

== Early life ==
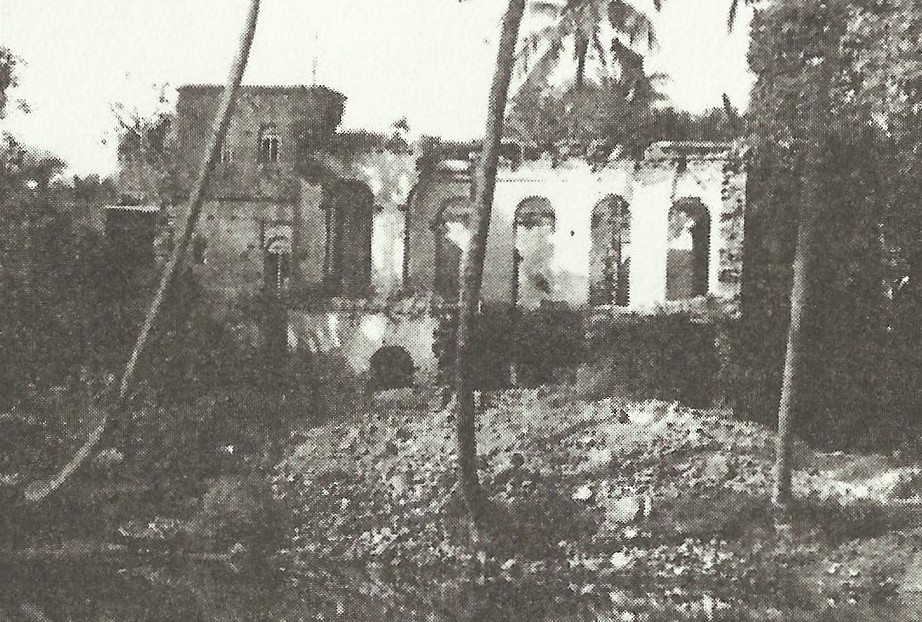
Ancestral house of Priyanath Bose.

Priyanath Bose was born in the Bose family of Chhota Jagulia in 24 Parganas district in Bengal in the year 1865, the youngest of three sons to Manomohan Bose. His father was a poet and a playwright. He was one of the organizers of the Hindu Mela in Kolkata and a great orator known for his nationalistic speeches. His immediate elder brother Motilal Bose was a wrestler who founded an akhada in Chingirpota whose members were later involved in revolutionary activities. The Bose family had a residence in Kolkata at the crossing of Bidhan Sarani and Vivekananda Road.

Priyanath attended primary school in Chhota Jagulia and then took admission at the Metropolitan Institution in Kolkata. During his student life, he took keen interest in physical culture. He learned gymnastics from Gourhari Mukhopadhyay, one of the popular instructors of the time. Priyanth became an expert in the pyramid and juggling acts. He was also expert in the parallel and horizontal bars and horse riding. He not only became a good gymnast, he became a very good instructor as well. He was one of his best and successful pupils. Priyanth was more interested in gymnastics and physical culture than his studies. However, he was good at drawing. His father Manomohan Bose noticed this and admitted him to the Government Art School. Though he took admission at the art school, he never took it seriously.

== Career ==
=== Physical trainer ===
Gourhari Mukhopadhyay had inspired the youth to set up numerous akhadas in Ahiritola and many other parts of Kolkata. However, it became difficult for him to attend all of them as an instructor. So he delegated some of the akhadas to Priyanth Bose. While working as an instructor at the akhadas of Gourhari Mukhopadhyay, Priyanth along with one of his assistants Bholanath Mitra and a person by the name of 'Aulcharu' founded a gymnastic club in Simulia. Sharat Kumar Sarkar was the instructor at the club. Later, Priyanath and Bholanath parted ways and the club was closed. Bholanath Mitra founded his own akhada. Priyanth Bose too founded his own akhada in Simulia. Narendranath Dutta, his neighbour and the classmate of his elder brother Motilal Bose, who later became Swami Vivekananda used to train in this akhada.

The success of his first akhada at Simulia, inspired numerous gymnastic akhadas to be set up in Kolkata. According to his guru Gourhari Mukhopadhyay, Priyanth, himself used to coach in almost 50 akhadas between Simulia and Nebutala. Apart from coaching the pupils and managing the affairs of these clubs, he had also set up similar akhadas in Agarpara, Panihati and his own village Chhota Jagulia. When he established the akhada in his own village, the village elders did not like it. However, he was supported by his cousin Amarnath Bose, a reputed lawyer at the Calcutta High Court. He had sent his own sons to the akhada. Priyanath was not satisfied with training his pupils only in physical culture. He made them to clear the bushes, repair the roads, cremate the dead and do similar social work. Priyanth used to save his pocket money and take additional money from his mother and traveled to the villages and trained his pupils. He had three rules for his pupil at the akhadas. Firstly none would be admitted without permission from parents. Secondly, the pupils must not have any addiction to paan, smoking or snuff. Thirdly, the pupils were not permitted to have fashionable haircuts.

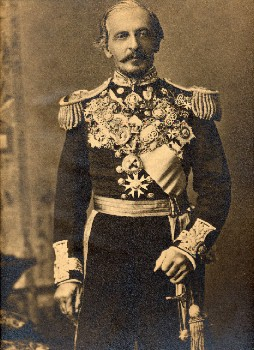
Lord Dufferin addressed Priyanath as Professor Bose.

In c. 1885, Priyanath was invited at a fancy fete event at the Zoological Gardens in Alipore where he exhibited the gymnastic feats of his pupils. Lord Dufferin, the Viceroy of India was present at the event. He was so pleased with the performance, he is said to have asked, "Who is the professor?". He expressed his interest in meeting Priyanath, and when they met, Lord Dufferin addressed him as Professor Bose. After that Priyanth became popular as Professor Bose.

=== Founding Great Bengal Circus ===
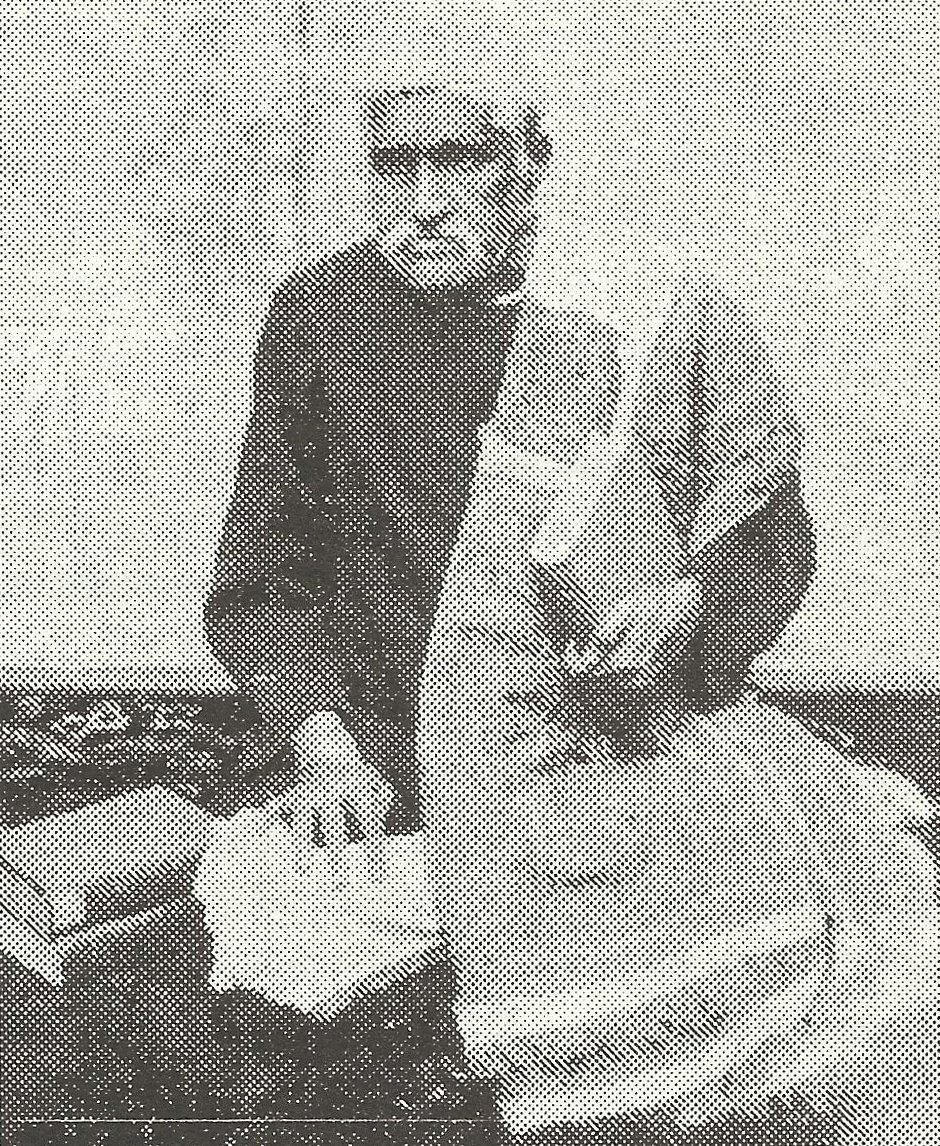
Manomohan Bose did not like his son taking up circus as a profession.

Whenever Wilson's Great World Circus or Chiarini's Italian Circus arrived in Kolkata, he would go to see their shows. At the show, he would resolve to set up his own circus, with an all-Bengali team and he would prove that Bengalis were also fearless and skillful. He would prepare sketches of the performing artistes at their various poses and bribe the circus workers to give him access to their equipment. He would prepare sketches of the equipment and take their measurements. He would prepare similar equipment and train his pupils with them.

Once while he was training his pupils at the akhada in his ancestral village of Chhota Jagulia, a very thin and skinny horse arrived there. His boys captured it and brought it to the akhada. Priyanath considered the sudden appearance of the horse out of nowhere as a good omen and an indication from the Supreme Being to start his own circus. After feeding the horse well, Priyanath began to train it in earnest. However, setting up a circus required a lot of investment. His father Manomohan Bose was never very comfortable with Priyanath choosing a career based on his gymnastic skills. Not only did he refuse to provide a single penny, he tried his best to change his son's mind. He arranged a job for Priyanath as a drawing instructor at a salary of ₹ 75 per month. Priyanath fumed at his father's actions and resolved to pursue his goal, in spite of opposition from his family. He began to amass the capital he would need on his own. He also borrowed some money from the women of his family and a few other sources. He formed a small team of gymnasts and, without informing his family, left Kolkata.

Priyanath and his team first went to Midnapore. Then he toured Jhargram, Bankura and Birbhum and performed at the zamindar houses. During this time, he did not have a tent, gallery or menagerie. After making some money on the tour, Priyanath returned to Kolkata. Then he bought the equipment, monkeys, dogs and horses of the National Circus from Nabagopal Mitra. He also arranged a tent. At this time he hired one horse from the akhada of Nanda Ghosh in Shyambazar. Rakhal Chandra Bose of the same akhada was appointed as the accountant. Priyanath augmented his team with a few more performers. In 1887, he formally launched his circus as Professor Bose's Great Bengal Circus.

=== Tour of India ===
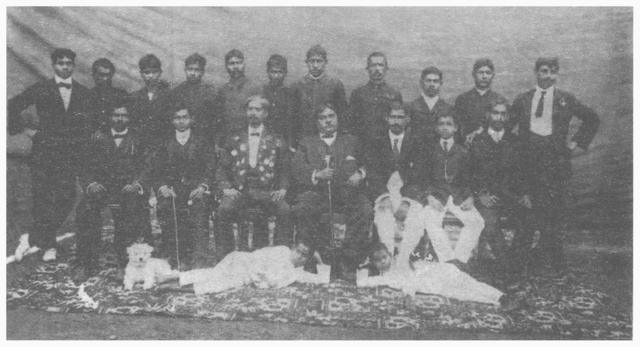
Priyanath Bose (seated 4th from left) with the members of Great Bengal Circus.

Priyanath took his circus on a tour of Bengal. He first toured Dhaka, Jhalokati and Barisal. Then he went on a second tour of Shantipur, Dainhat, Katwa and Murshidabad. In December 1888, the Great Bengal Circus was invited to perform equestrian and gymnastic feats at the Tajhat palace Gobindalal Roy, the zamindar of Rangpur. He was so impressed with their performance that he retained them two more nights and presented the team 25 pairs of shawls and certificate of excellence. Mahima Ranjan Roy Chowdhury, the zamindar of Kakina who was present at the Tajhat Palace at that time too certified the team's excellent performance and hoped the elites of the country to patronize the Great Bengal Circus. Soon the Great Bengal Circus began to be invited by the zamindars of Bengal. Many of the zamindars gifted them equipment and horses to the circus in addition to the stipulated payment. Later on it was patronized by the rulers of the princely states of Tripura, Rewa, Kashi, Kashmir and Jhalwar. Some of them gifted tigers and elephants to the circus.

As the news of success of Great Bengal Circus began to be published in the newspapers, people of Kolkata longed to see their performance in the city of its birth. In November 1899, the Great Bengal Circus came to the Kolkata for the first time since its inception. Priyanath Bose set up the tent at the Maidan. His shows were graced and patronized by eminent dignitaries including the Maharajas of Kapurthala and Cooch Behar and the zamindar of Burdwan. Starting from the winter of 1899–1900, the Priyanath Bose used to camp in Kolkata each winter till the 1911–12 season.

=== Asian tours ===
In the summer of 1900, Priyanath traveled with his circus along the Indian coast to Ceylon. In Ceylon, Priyanath recruited a man known for eating anything. He would devour rags, raw meat, nails, broken glass and brick bats. He was advertised as Rakshasha of Lanka. In 1902, Priyanath Bose embarked on a South East Asian tour. Great Bengal Circus travelled to Yangon, Penang, Singapore and Java. The tour met with a great success. Priyanath Bose returned home with new animal recruits for his menagerie. From then on Priyanath Bose began to travel to South East Asia every season. His circus would spend the major part of year in Burma, British Malaya and the Dutch East Indies and return to Kolkata in the winter.

== Death ==
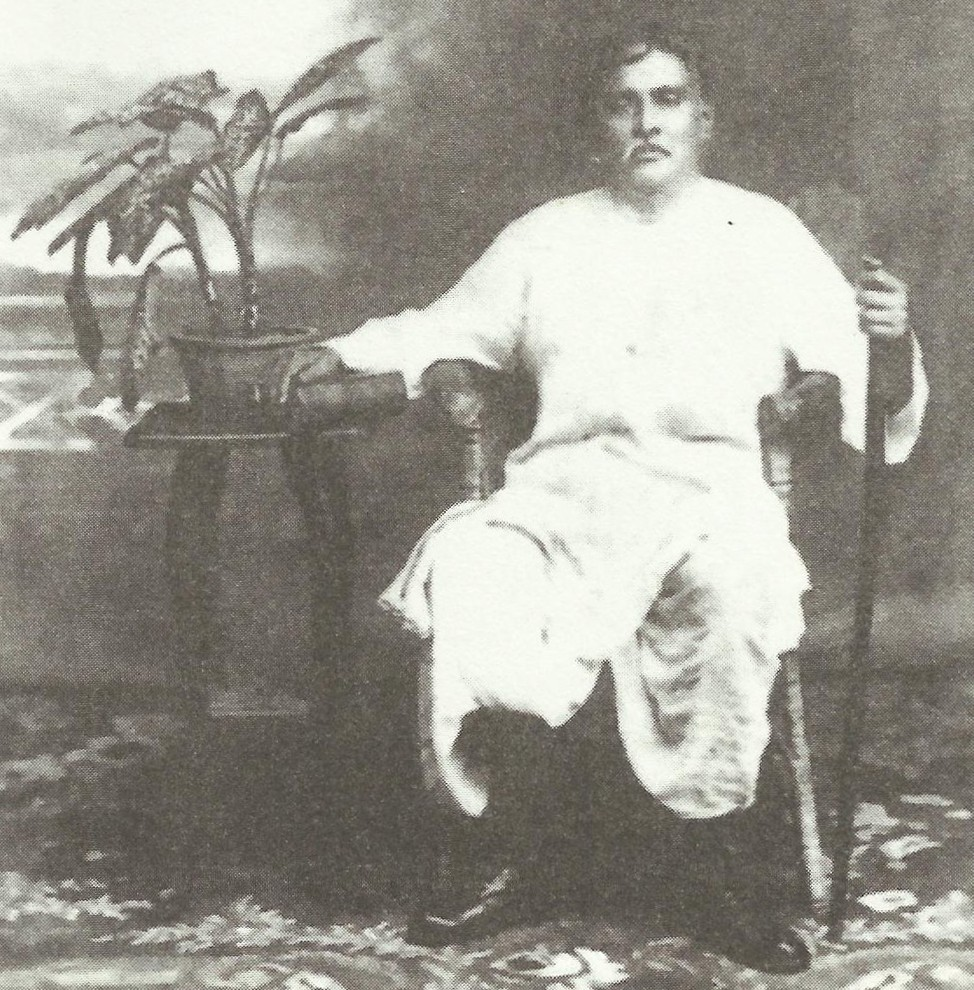
Priyanath Bose before death

During this tour, Priyanath Bose contracted jaundice. While his Professor Bose's Grand Circus was touring Klang and other cities of British Malaya, Priyanath went to Singapore for treatment. He was under the treatment of Dr. Galloway and Dr. Wilson for about a month. His condition, however, did not improve. Priyanath died on 21 May 1920 in Singapore.

== Priyanath Bose's circus show ==
The circus consisted of trapeze acts, gymnastics and wild animals. Not just men, but there were women performers in the circus act as well. Bose hired Gus Burns, an American, to train the tigers and lions, and there were later Indian men and women who performed as ringmasters, as well.

Dr. Bose was himself an expert at juggling and equestrian events.
