= Manomohan Bose =

Bengali playwright and writer

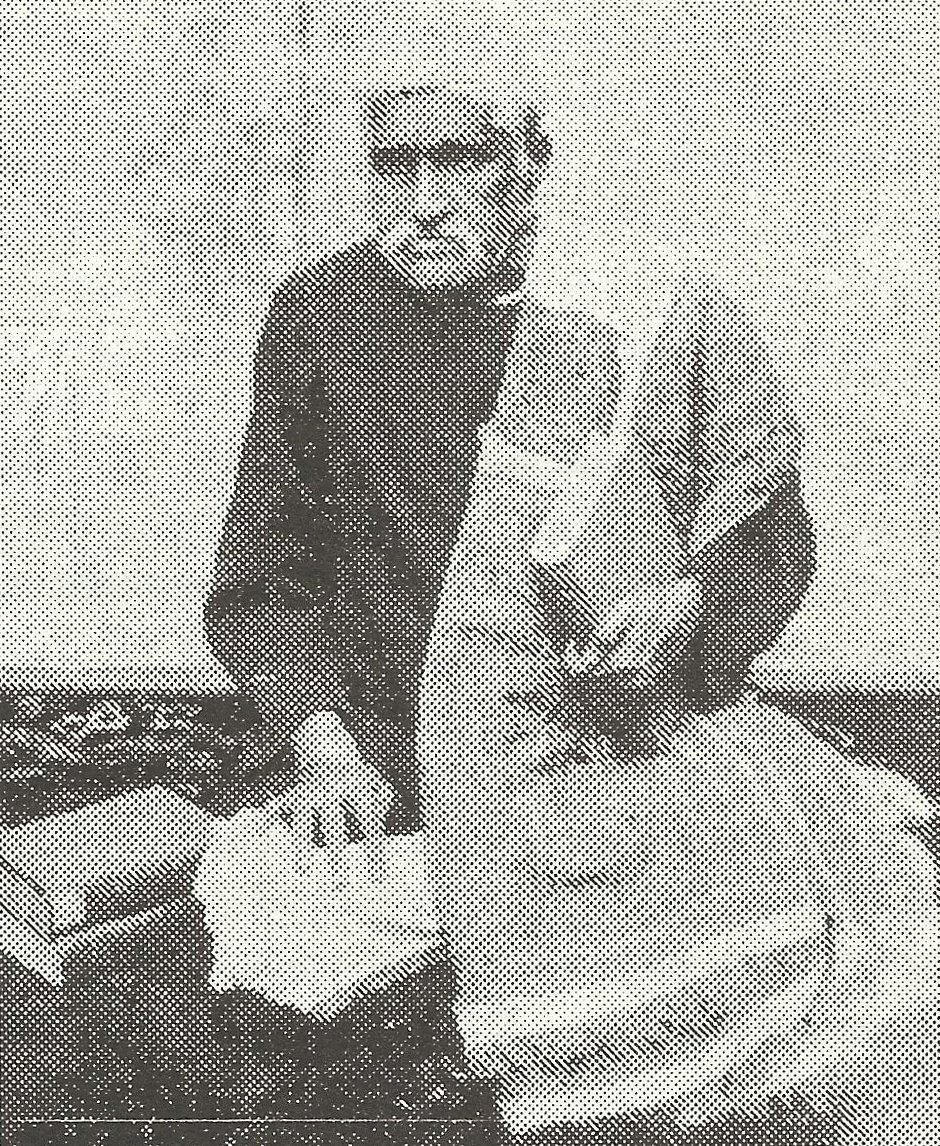
- Manomohan Bose
- Born: 17 July, 1831; Nishchintapur, Jessore District, Bengal Presidency, British India
- Died: 4 February, 1912 (Age 80); Calcutta, Bengal Presidency, India
- Occupations: Journalist, poet, and playwright
- Known for: Poetry, Literature

Manomohan Bose was a Bengali journalist, poet, and playwright.

== Early life ==
Bose was born in 1831 in Nishchintapur, Jessore District, Bengal Presidency, British India at his maternal Uncle's house. He belonged to the famous Bose family of Chhota Jagulia, North 24 Parganas District of present-day West Bengal. He studied at the Sanskrit school in Jessore and Hare School in Calcutta. He then went onto to study at the Scottish Church College. He was inspired to write by Ishwar Chandra Gupta.

== Career ==
Bose wrote for Ishwar Chandra Gupta's Sambad Prabhakar. His writings were also published in Akshay Kumar Datta's Tattvabodhini. He wrote in and edited Madhyastha in 1872 and Sambad Bibhakar in 1852. He wrote a number of plays based on history and mythology. His plays were nationalist in nature. He supported the Hindu Mela, a nationalist organization. In 1896 he was the Vice-President of Bangiya Sahitya Parishad.

== Selected bibliography ==
- Sati (1873)
- Ramabhisek (1867)
- Pranayapariksa (1869)
- Harishchandra (1875)
- Parthaparajay (1881)
- Raslila (1889)
- Anandamay (1889)
- Hindur Achar-byabahar (1873)
- Baktrtamala (1873)
- Dulin (1891).
- Manomohan Gitabali

== Death ==
Bose died in 1912.
