= Santi Gopal Sen =

Bengali revolutionary (1913-1996)

Shanti Gopal Sen
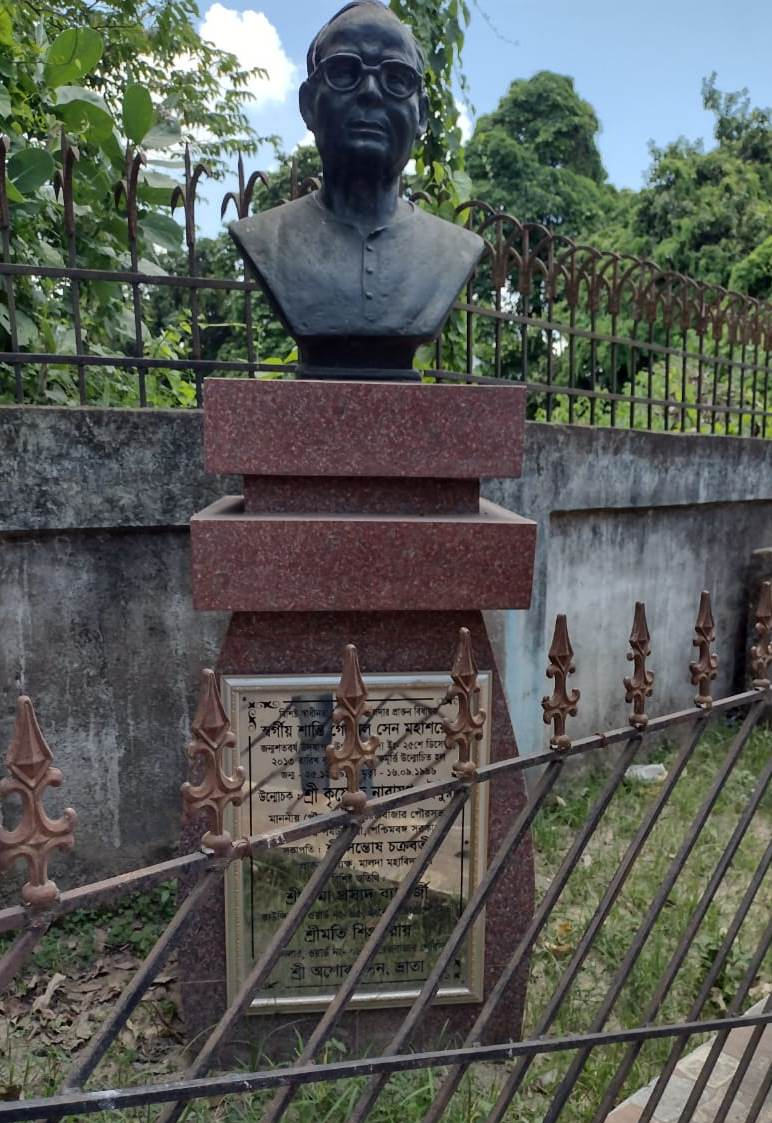
- Born: 25 December 1913; English Bazar, Malda, Bengal Presidency, British India
- Died: 16 September 1996 (aged 82); English Bazar, Malda, India
- Occupation: Revolutionary
- Organization: Bengal Volunteers
- Movement: Indian Freedom Movement

Shanti Gopal Sen ( 25 December 1913 – 16 September 1996 ) was an Indian revolutionary and member of the Bengal Volunteers who carried out assassinations against British colonial officials in an attempt to secure Indian independence. As he was a sharp shooter the British named him as Shanti Gopal Crackshoot Sen.

== Early life and education ==
Santi Gopal Sen was born in Malda in the year 1913. After passing the matriculation examination from Malda Zilla School he went to Midnapur with his father who was transferred from Malda to Midnapur and later he admitted to Midnapur College for further studies. Later he joined the Bengal Volunteers, a revolutionary organisation of British India.

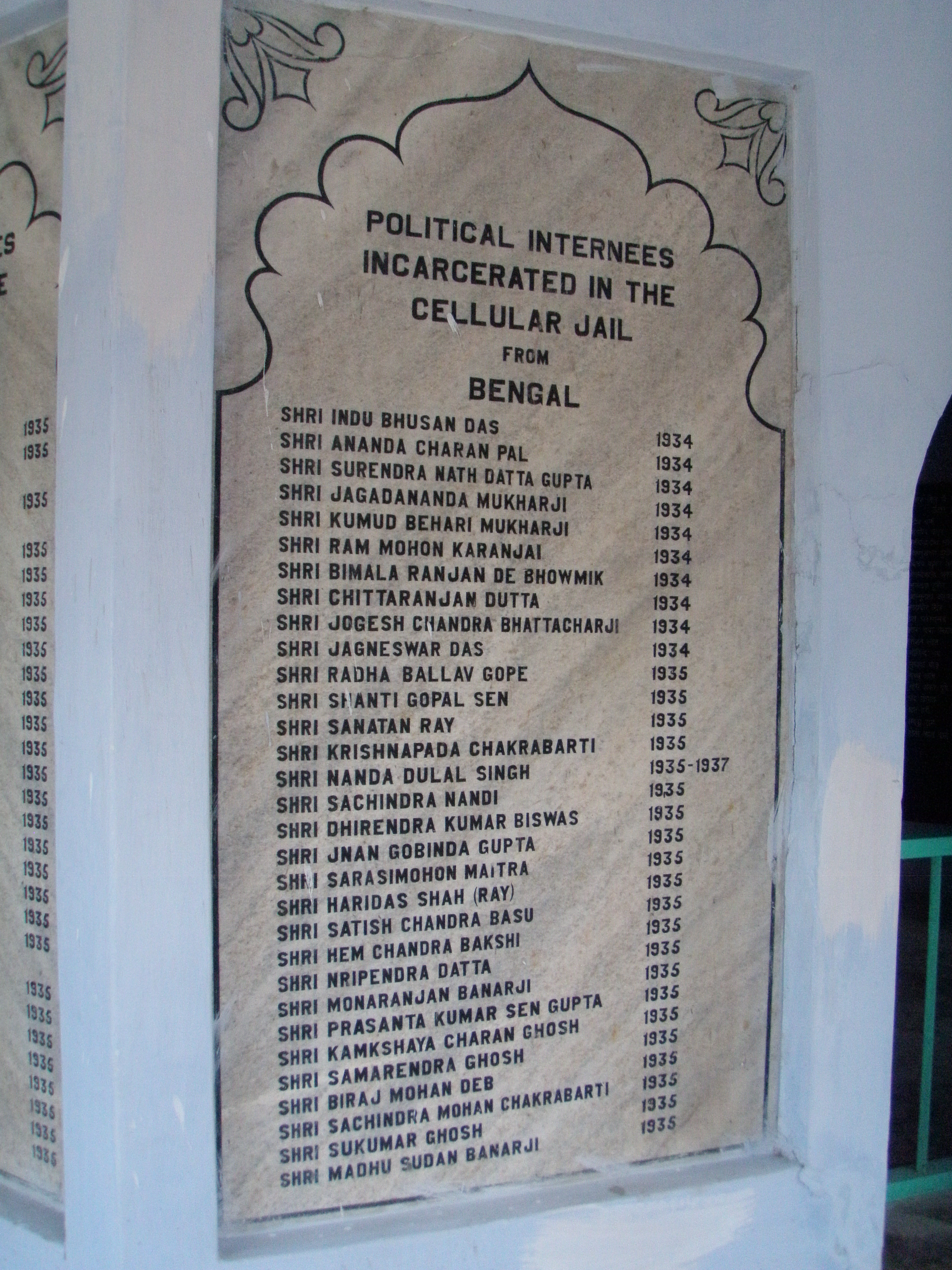
Shanti Gopal Sen's name in Andaman Cellular Jail list, Port Blair 2009

== Revolutionary activities ==
After the murders of two previous District Magistrates James Peddy and Robert Douglas, no British officer was ready to take charge of Midnapore district. Former soldier Bernard E. J. Burge was then posted to Midnapore district. Members of the Bengal Volunteers: Ramkrishna Roy, Brajakishore Chakraborty, Prabhanshu Sekhar Pal, Kamakhya Charan Ghosh, Sonatan Roy, Nanda Dulal Singh, Sukumar Sengupta, Bijoy Krishna Ghose, Purnananda Sanyal, Manindra Nath Choudhury, Saroj Ranjan Das Kanungo, Santi Gopal Sen, Sailesh Chandra Ghose, Anath Bondhu Panja and Mrigendra Dutta decided to assassinate him. Roy, Chakraborty, Nirmal Jibon Ghosh and Dutta planned to shoot Burge dead while he was playing in a football match between Midnapore Mohammedan sporting Club (a fan club of Mohammedan SC (Kolkata)) and Midnapore Town Club(Bradley-Birt Challenge Cup Corners Shield Competition.) at the police grounds of Midnapore. On 2nd September 1933 during the half time of the football match on the police parade ground, Burge was shot and killed by Panja and Dutta. Panja was killed instantly by one of Burges' bodyguards. Dutta was also shot and died in hospital on the next day. Anath Bondhu Panja and Mrigendra Dutta were acquitted of the murder of Magistrate Burge. After the shootout he took a cycle and fled to the Salbani Jungle. There he boarded train from the railway station of Godapiasal. A revolutionary named Binod Sen aks Binod Bihari Sen from village Godapiasal helps him for this matter. After one year he was arrested from Kolkata. British Government made a separate trial for him. The special tribunal sentenced him and six others to life imprisonment and moved him to the Andaman Islands. He release from prison in 1946,

== Later life ==
After the Independence of India, Sen won several elections, which included the English Bazar seat of West Bengal Assembly in 1957, 1962, and 1967. Each time he won the Assembly poll as an Indian National Congress candidate. For the rest of his life Sen worked as a social worker. He was honoured with a Tamrapatra by the Indian Government in 1972. He donated in various way for the establishment of Malda Women's College and Malda Girls School (Shanti Sen Girls School). A road named Shanti Sen Sarani was named after him.Sen died on 16 September 1996.
