= Sukumar Sengupta =

Bengali revolutionary (1913-1993)

- Born: 5 November 1913; Katwa, Purba Bardhaman district
- Died: 16 September 1993 (aged 79); Midnapore, India
- Occupation: Revolutionary
- Organization: Bengal Volunteers
- Movement: Indian Freedom Movement

Sukumar Sengupta ( 5 November 1913 – 16 September 1993 ) was an Indian revolutionary and member of the Bengal Volunteers who carried out assassinations against British colonial officials in an attempt to secure Indian independence.

== Early life and education ==
Sukumar Sengupta was born in Katwa, Purba Bardhaman district in the year 1913. He went to Bihar with his father who was transferred from Katwa to Biharr and later he came to Midnapore at his uncle Nripendra Nath Senguptas house and admitted to Midnapur College for his ISc studies. Later he joined the Bengal Volunteers, a revolutionary organisation of British India.

== Revolutionary activities ==
After the murders of two previous District Magistrates James Peddy and Robert Douglas, no British officer was ready to take charge of Midnapore district. Former soldier Bernard E. J. Burge was then posted to Midnapore district. Members of the Bengal Volunteers: Ramkrishna Roy, Brajakishore Chakraborty, Prabhanshu Sekhar Pal, Kamakhya Charan Ghosh, Sonatan Roy, Nanda Dulal Singh, Sukumar Sen Gupta, Bijoy Krishna Ghose, Purnananda Sanyal, Manindra Nath Choudhury, Saroj Ranjan Das Kanungo, Santi Gopal Sen, Sailesh Chandra Ghose, Anath Bondhu Panja and Mrigendra Dutta decided to assassinate him. Roy, Chakraborty, Nirmal Jibon Ghosh and Dutta planned to shoot Burge dead while he was playing in a football match between Midnapore Mohammedan sporting Club (a fan club of Mohammedan SC (Kolkata)) and Midnapore Town Club(Bradley-Birt Challenge Cup Corners Shield Competition.) at the police grounds of Midnapore. On 2nd September 1933 during the half time of the football match on the police parade ground, Burge was shot and killed by Panja and Dutta. Panja was killed instantly by one of Burges' bodyguards. Dutta was also shot and died in hospital on the next day. Anath Bondhu Panja and Mrigendra Dutta were acquitted of the murder of Magistrate Burge. The special tribunal sentenced him and six others to life imprisonment and later moved him to the Andaman Islands where he participated in a hunger strike in 1937 for 37 days. After some years, he was repatriated and released, but his activism continued, leading to another hunger strike in 1939 for 36 days. He release from prison in 31st August 1946,

== Post-Independence Struggles & Imprisonment ==
After India's independence in 1947, Sengupta faced repeated arrests for his party work, spending nearly 20 years in jail across different periods, including significant time from 1948-1951 when the CPI was banned. He was instrumental in rebuilding the party in Medinipur after the anti-revisionist split, focusing on constructing a new organization based on Marxism-Leninism.

== Leadership & Legacy ==
Sengupta served as Secretary of the Medinipur district committee and a member of the CPI(M)'s State Committee until his death, also leading the CITU (Centre of Indian Trade Unions) in the district. He was a respected figure, known for his deep connection with peasants, and chaired the state's freedom fighter pension committee, a testament to his enduring commitment to the cause. His life exemplified the dedication of Marxist leaders who continued the struggle for social justice and economic equality in independent India, with his passing marked by the red flag of the party he served until the end. Sen died on 16 September 1993.
