= Kamakhya Charan Ghosh =

Bengali revolutionary (1914–1997)

- Born: 19 April 1914; Midnapore, Bengal Presidency, British India
- Died: 19 April 1997 (aged 84); Midnapore, India
- Occupation: Revolutionary
- Organization: Bengal Volunteers
- Movement: Indian Freedom Movement

Kamakhya Charan Ghosh (19 April 1914 – 19 April 1997) was an Indian revolutionary and member of the Bengal Volunteers who carried out assassinations against British colonial officials in an attempt to secure Indian independence.

== Early life and education ==
Kamakhya Ghosh was born in Midnapore in the year 1914. After passing the matriculation examination from Midnapore Town School. he admitted to Midnapur College for further studies. Later he joined the Bengal Volunteers, a revolutionary organisation of British India.

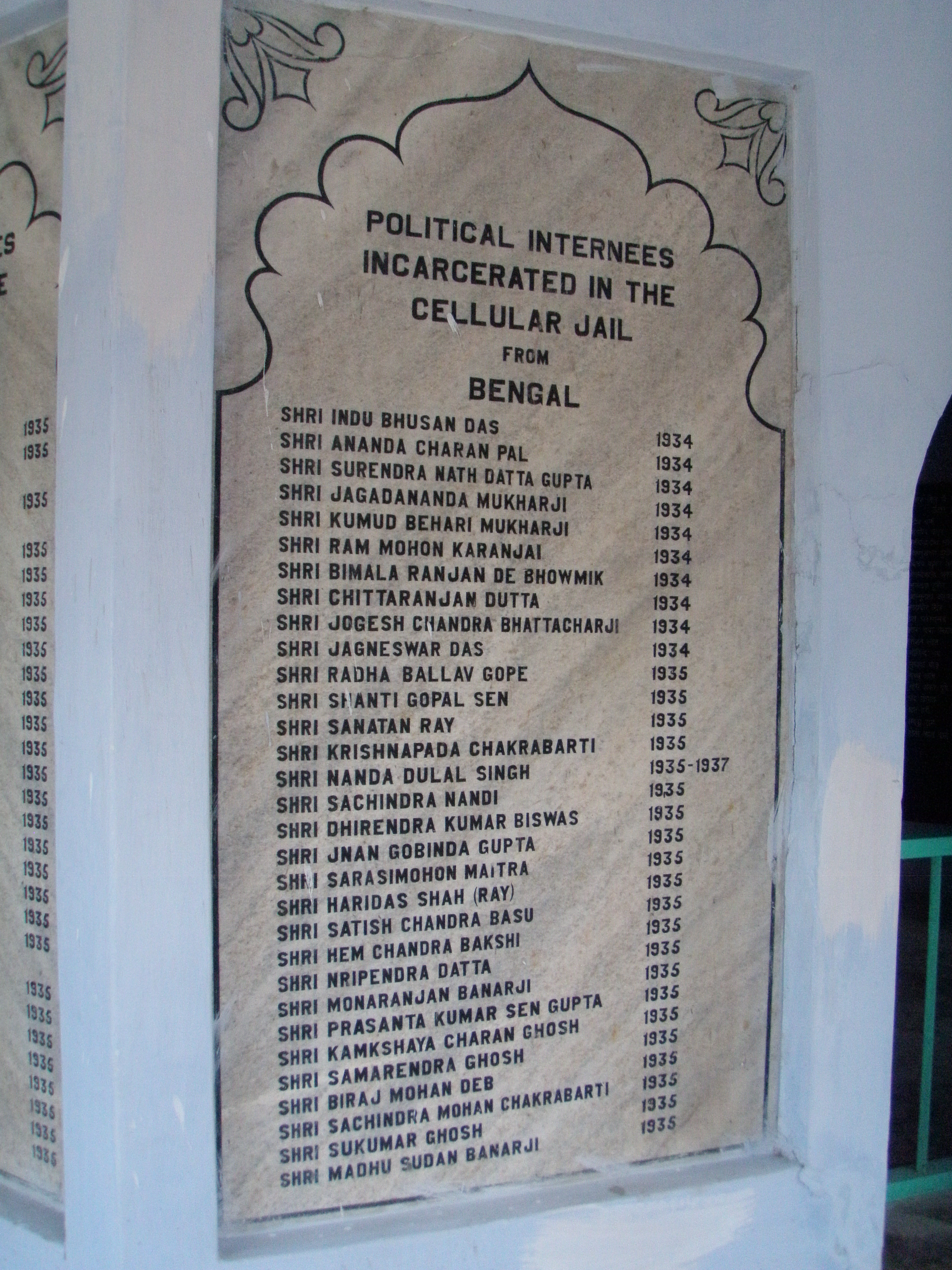
Kamakhya Charan Ghosh 's name in Andaman Cellular Jail list, Port Blair 2009

== Revolutionary activities ==
After the murders of two previous District Magistrates James Peddy and Robert Douglas, no British officer was ready to take charge of Midnapore district. Former soldier Bernard E. J. Burge was then posted to Midnapore district. Members of the Bengal Volunteers: Ramkrishna Roy, Brajakishore Chakraborty, Prabhanshu Sekhar Pal, Kamakhya Charan Ghosh, Sonatan Roy, Nanda Dulal Singh, Sukumar Sen Gupta, Bijoy Krishna Ghose, Purnananda Sanyal, Manindra Nath Choudhury, Saroj Ranjan Das Kanungo, Santi Gopal Sen, Sailesh Chandra Ghose, Anath Bondhu Panja and Mrigendra Dutta decided to assassinate him. Roy, Chakraborty, Nirmal Jibon Ghosh and Dutta planned to shoot Burge dead while he was playing in a football match between Midnapore Mohammedan sporting Club (a fan club of Mohammedan SC (Kolkata)) and Midnapore Town Club(Bradley-Birt football tournament) at the police grounds of Midnapore. On 2 September 1933 during the half time of the football match on the police parade ground, Burge was shot and killed by Panja and Dutta. Panja was killed instantly by one of Burges' bodyguards. Dutta was also shot and died in hospital on the next day. Anath Bondhu Panja and Mrigendra Dutta were acquitted of the murder of Magistrate Burge. After the shootout he was arrested from the Salbani Jungle. He was subjected to inhuman torture by the Superintendent of Police in police custody, which was acknowledged by the judge. . On 10 February 1934, a special tribunal sentenced him and six others to life imprisonment and moved to the Andaman Islands. He release from prison in 1946. before independence he spend more than 13 years in jail

== Later life ==
After the Independence of India, he became a member of the Communist Party. After the party was outlawed, he was imprisoned again and spent a total of nineteen years in prison at various stages. He led the peasant-labor organization. From 1967 to 1991. Ghosh was elected to the Legislative Assembly six times as a member of the Communist Party i.e. 1967,1969, 1979 (Repolling after Bankim Bihari Pals death), 1982, 1987, 1991. From 1969 to 1980 he was also the secretary of the party's Midnapore district committee. He was a member of Vidyasagar University and Midnapore College Committee
