= Midnapore Collegiate School =

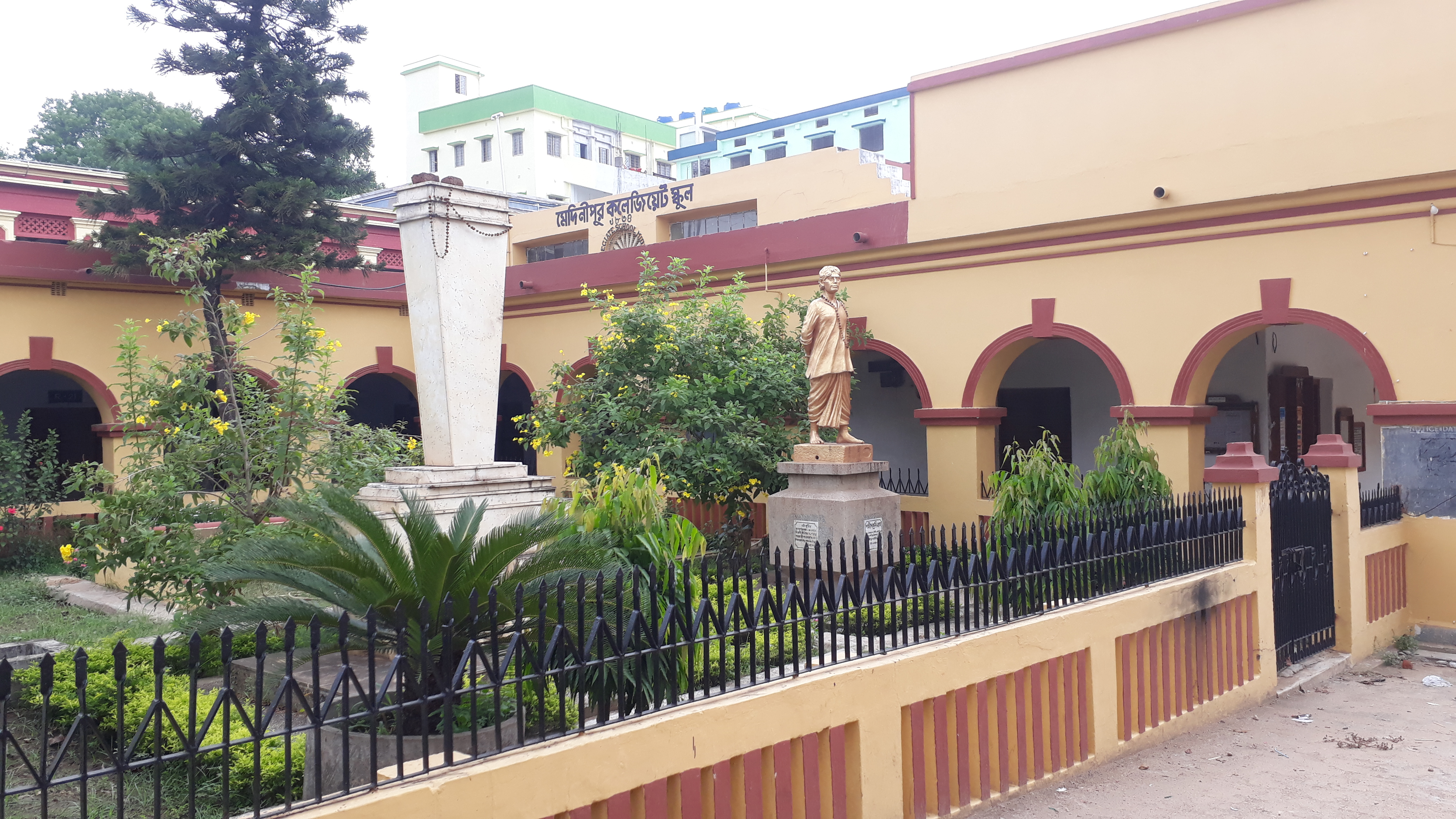
- Midnapore, West Medinipur, West Bengal; India

Information
- Former names: Governmental Zilla School; Midnapore Zilla School
- Type: Public Boys' School
- Established: 14 November 1834; 191 years ago
- Staff: 61
- Faculty: 55
- Enrollment: 1600
- Language: Bengali, English
- Campus: Urban
- Affiliations: WBBSE, WBCHSE

Midnapore Collegiate School, formerly Governmental Zilla School, established on 14 November 1834, is one of the oldest schools in Bengal as well as India. The students and teachers of this school made contributions to Indian Freedom Movement during the British Rule. Khudiram Bose, a martyr in the freedom struggle was one of the students of the school. Some other alumni of the institution are Bankim Chandra Chattopadhyay, Sanjib Chandra Chattopadhyay, Manik Bandopadhyay, and Soumya Sankar Bose. Brahmo Samaj leader Rishi Rajnarayan Basu as headmasters had also contributed in building up the institution. It was formerly the Zilla School of Midnapore (currently Paschim Medinipur) in West Bengal.

== Early history ==
The school was established by people of Midnapore. With the economic help of Tezchandra Mehtab Raybahadur, the school had started its journey with a few thatched huts and 18 students. The first headmaster was Rasiklal Sen and after just two years, the school got the honour of Governmental Zilla School in 1836. When Calcutta University was established in 1857, the school came under its supervision.

During the time of British Headmasters Sir F. Tydd and Mr. Sinclare, their thought about teaching was,"the interrogative system of teaching should be carefully pursued during every step of the scholar's progress as the simplest and most effectual means of conveying knowledge." 'Sahityasamrat' of Bengal, Rishi Bankim Chandra Chattopadhyay and his elder brother Sanjib Chandra Chattopadhyay studied here.Bankim Chandra Chattopadhyay studied here from 1845 to 1849.

== Rajnarayan era ==
Rajnarayan Bose, the socio-religious reformer and educationist took over the post of headmaster in 1851, and after 15 years retired in 1866. Another son of Medinipur, Sri Ishwar Chandra Vidyasagar who was then the Principal of Sanskrit college, Kolkata, received the order of Council of Education that Rajnarayan Bose, Professor of English Department, would be appointed as the fourth Headmaster of Midnapore School. Rajnarayan Bose was already a stalwart figure in the field of Brahmo Samaj movement and have been a Young Bengal leader. He took over the post of headmaster on 21 January 1851. He was a revolutionary educationist of that time as he had ushered in a complete redress in the education system, i.e.,

- He abolished corporal punishment and introduced a friendly and cooperative atmosphere among the teachers and students to make education more interesting to them.
- He hated the procedure of "committing to memory and vomiting to paper". He followed the rule of teaching through interaction of both students and teachers. His eloquent speeches with humorous jokes attracted all students in the class. He put stress on interrogative teaching, so that the fundamentals of the student becomes strong.
- He understood that the students also need physical exercise and sports so he made a lawn tennis court and a gymnasium in the school premises.
- He observed that students sitting on benches without back-support cannot keep their backs straight, so their attention span becomes shorter while studying. So he introduced seats with back-supports for the first time.
- Being an active leader of Young Bengal, he was moved by the 'Academic Association' of Henry Louis Vivian Derozio so he introduced Debate Associations and Mutual Improvement Association in school level.

Due to his ideas, the school was part of nationalist movements, widow-marriage, female education, Brahmo Samaj movements and many more socio-political activities. He was probably the first headmaster of any governmental school who had dared to inspire his students to join the freedom movement and even had hoisted the national flag on the school premises. He adorned the chair of Headmaster till 1866.

== The age of nationalism ==
The school in Midnapore was noted for nurturing the nationalist movement. Teachers like Hemchandra Kanungo, Ganendranath Basu, Pyarilal Ghosh, were noted for their nationalist teachings. Khudiram Bose, probably the youngest martyr hanged, was an alumnus of the school. He was recruited to the Anushilan Samiti by Hem Chandra Kanungo, a teacher of this school. His 'guru' in this field was Satyendranath Basu, an alumnus as well as a teacher of this school. He smilingly took the hangman's noose on 11 August 1908. A statue of him can be seen in the school's garden now.

Khudiram's political master, Satyendranath Basu was hanged in the same year on 23 November. Another alumnus, Anath bandhu Panja went to the gallows in 1933. Tyrant District Magistrate James Peddie was shot dead on 7 April 1931, inside the school by two freedom fighters, Shri Bimal Dasgupta and Jyoti Jibon Ghosh. One can still find this room in this school which had been reconstructed and inaugurated by the main suspect in the political-murder case, Bimal Dasgupta himself.

== Succession list of Principals ==
Name	From	To
Rasiklal Sen	14.11.1834	31.12.1835
F. Tydd	Jan. 1836	Jul. 1847
Mr. Sinclair	Aug. 1847	Nov. 1850
Rajnarayan Basu	21.01.1851	06.03.1866 (on leave until 31.12.1868)
Gangadhar Acharya (Note: The first Principal of Midnapore College)	01.01.1869	28.04.1892
Shyama Charan Das	May 1884	Jun. 1892
Hari Charan Roy	24.06.1892	20.04.1897
Abhay Charan Basu	Jun. 1897	Apr. 1898
Upendra Nath Chandra	16.04.1898	08.02.1927
Hiralal Dasgupta	09.02.1927	31.01.1932
Narayan Kumar Mukherjee (OFFG)	01.11.1932	31.03.1933
Bholanath Swarnakar	01.04.1933	31.12.1935
Sasadhar Banerjee (Note: Indian District Magistrate ICS Mr. Binoy Ranjan Sen was the president of Midnapore Collegiate School From 27.04.1937 to 21.03.1940)	02.01.1936	20.02.1947
Satish Ranjan Banerjee	01.07.1947	15.03.1951
sk sohel	16.03.1951	31.01.1963
Gostha Behari Pal (OFFG)	01.02.1963	30.07.1964
Bimala Prasanna Majumdar	31.07.1964	31.10.1966
Haripada Mondal	01.11.1966	11.09.1992
Anuttam Bhattacharya (A.H.M & T.I.C)	12.09.1992	30.09.1998
Ajoy Kumar Roy (T.I.C)	01.10.1998	30.04.1999
Shyamapada Das (A.H.M & T.I.C)	01.05.1999	04.01.2000
Suchand Kumar Pan	05.01.2000	31.07.2004
Arun Kumar Bag (T.I.C)	01.08.2004	15.09.2005
Dr. Dilip Kumar Das (Note: Awarded the 'Rashtrapati Puraskar)	16.09.2005	16.09.2015
Pintu Samanta	17.09.2015	31.08.2018
Mrs.Himani Parya	01.09.2018	-

== Notable alumni ==
- Manik Bandopadhyay - Bengali novelist.
- Khudiram Bose - martyr of Indian freedom movement.
- Soumya Sankar Bose - Indian artist.
- Sir Abdur Rahim - Muslim League politician and Justice.
- Dr. Hassan Suhrawardy - first Muslim Vice-chancellor of Calcutta University.
- Bankim Chandra Chattopadhyay - author of Vande Mataram
- Anath Bondhu Panja - revolutionary and martyred, member of the Bengal Volunteers

• Satyendranath Basu - Indian freedom fighter and member of Anushilan Samiti.

• Sanjib Chandra Chattopadhyay - Elder brother of Bankim Chandra Chattopadhyay and author of Palamau,Jal Pratap Chandra etc.

== Notes ==
on 05.09.2010 at Vigyan Bhavan ,New Delhi from the Hon'ble President of India,Smt. Pratibha Devi Singh Patil .

d. On the occasion of the centenary celebration of the school in 1938 Dr. Sarvepalli Radhakrishnan graced the event with his presence .

e. On 6 th May 2013 , during the ceremony of the 175 th year celebrations,Hon'ble President of India , Sri Pranab Mukherjee laid the foundation stone of the school auditorium . Present on the occasion were the Governor of West Bengal Shri M.K. Narayan and the Tourism Minister Dr. Sudarshan Ghosh Dastidar .
