= Mrigendranath Dutta =

Indian revolutionary (1911-1933)

Mrigendra Dutta
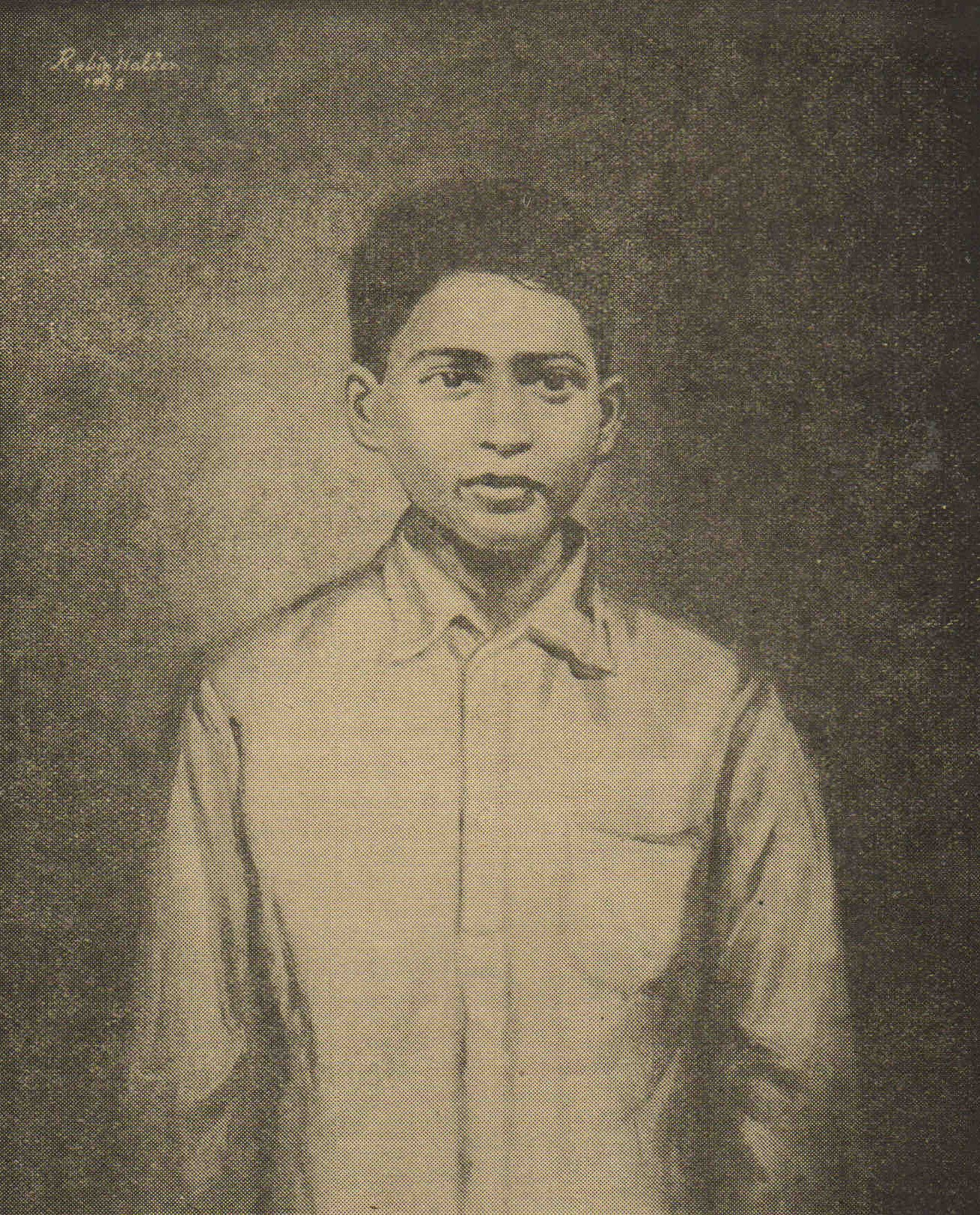
- Born: 27 October 1915; Paharipur, Midnapore , Bengal Presidency, British India
- Died: 3 September 1933 (aged 17); Midnapore Medical College, Midnapore, Bengal Presidency, British India
- Occupation: Revolutionary
- Organization: Bengal Volunteers
- Movement: Indian independence movement

Mrigendranath Dutta (27 October 1915 – 3 September 1933) was an Indian revolutionary and member of the Bengal Volunteers who carried out assassinations against British colonial officials in an attempt to secure Indian independence.

== Family ==
Mrigen was born in kayastha family of Paharipur village, Paschim Medinipur in 1915. His father name was Beni Madhab Dutta. He completed his early education from Midnapore Town School.

== Revolutionary activities ==
After the murders of two previous District Magistrates James Peddy and Robert Douglas, no British officer was ready to take charge of Midnapore district. Bernard E. J. Burge was posted in Midnapore district. Members of the Bengal Volunteers: Ramkrishna Roy, Brajakishore Chakraborty, Prabhanshu Sekhar Pal, Kamakhya Charan Ghosh, Sonatan Roy, Nanda Dulal Singh, Sukumar Sen Gupta, Bijoy Krishna Ghose, Purnananda Sanyal, Manindra Nath Choudhury, Saroj Ranjan Das Kanungo, Santi Gopal Sen, Sailesh Chandra Ghose, Anath Bondhu Panja and Mrigendra Dutta decided to assassinate him. Roy, Chakraborty, Nirmal Jibon Ghosh and Dutta planned to shoot Burge dead while he was playing in a football match (Bradley-Birt football tournament Corners Shield Competition.) at the police grounds of Midnapore. Actually the magistrate was a member of both Calcutta football Club and Calcutta cricket Club present time Calcutta Cricket and Football Club.On 2 September 1933 during the half time of the football match on the police parade ground, Burge was shot and killed by Panja and Dutta. Panja was killed instantly by one of Burkes' bodyguards. Dutta was also shot and died in hospital the next day. Anath Bondhu Panja and Mrigendra Dutta were acquitted on the charge of murder of Magistrate Burge,

== Death ==
Mrigendra Dutta died in the Midnapore Sadar Hospital now Midnapore Medical College and Hospital on the next day i.e. 2 September 1933.
