= Nirmal Jibon Ghosh =

Bengali revolutionary (1916–1934)

Nirmal Jiban Ghosh
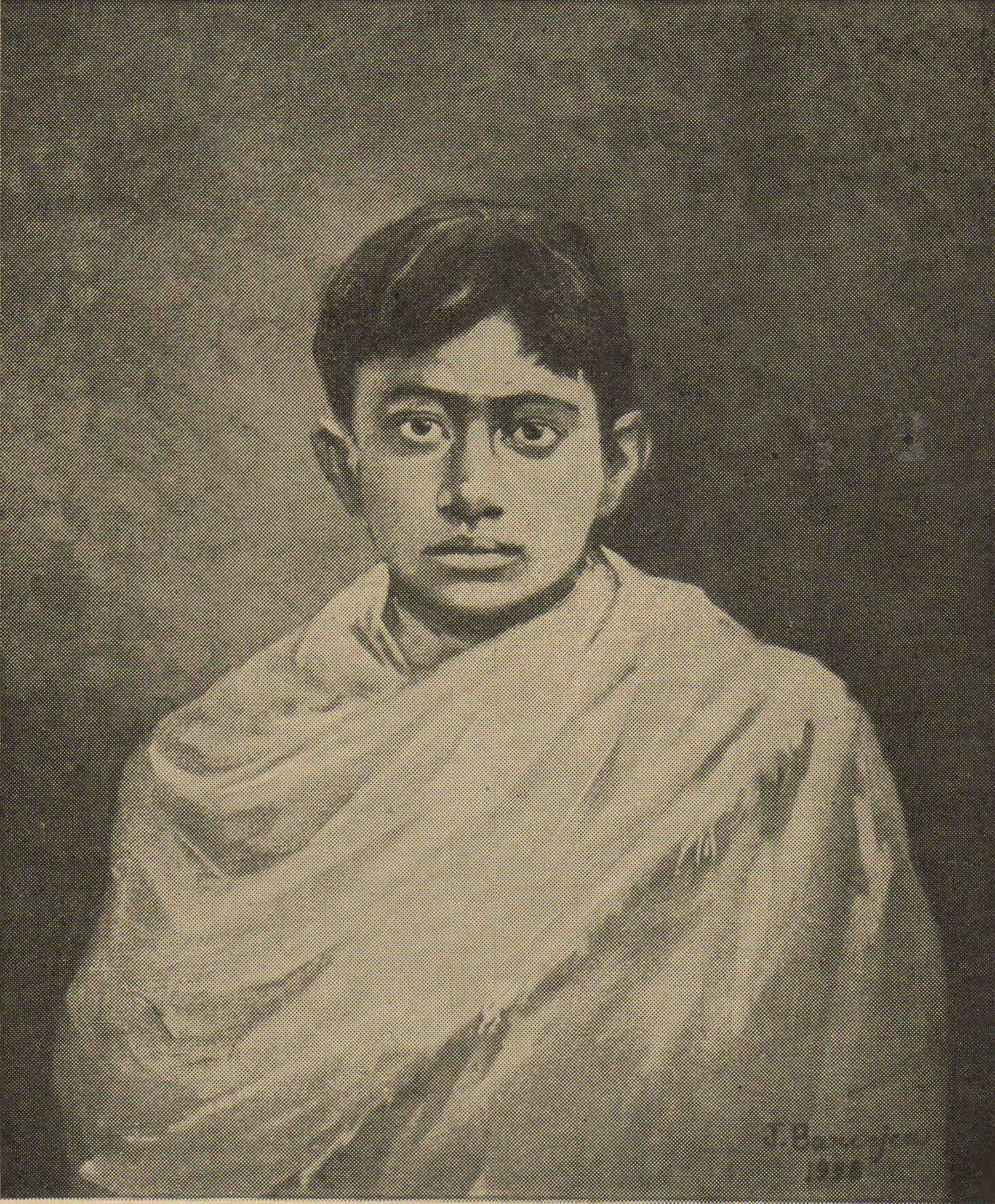
- Born: 5 January 1916; Hoogli, British India
- Died: 26 October 1934 (aged 18); Midnapore Central Jail, Midnapore, Bengal Presidency, British India (now in West Bengal, India)
- Occupation: Revolutionary
- Organization: Bengal Volunteers
- Movement: Indian Freedom Movement

Nirmal Jiban Ghosh (5 January 1916 – 26 October 1934) was an Indian revolutionary and member of the Bengal Volunteers. He was hanged on 26 October 1934 for the charge of assassination of Magistrate Burge.

== Family ==
Ghosh was born in Dhamasin village, Hooghly district in 1916. His father name was Jamini Jibon Ghosh. He was admitted in I.A. in Midnapore College and joined the Bengal Volunteers, a revolutionary organisation of British India. His family was attached with the Indian freedom movement. His brother Prof. Binoy Jibon Ghosh was dismissed from service for having a connection with the Swadeshi movement. Another brother Naba Jibon Ghosh committed suicide while imprisoned by the British. His elder brother Jyoti Jibon Ghosh was also imprisoned.

== Revolutionary activities ==
After the assassination of two previous District Magistrates James Peddy and Robert Douglas, no British officer was ready to take charge of Midnapore district. Bernard E. J. Burge, a ruthless District Magistrate and former soldier, was posted to Midnapore. Members of the Bengal Volunteers, Ramkrishna Roy, Brajakishore Chakraborty, Prabhanshu Sekhar Pal, Kamakhya Charan Ghosh, Sonatan Roy, Nanda Dulal Singh, Sukumar Sen Gupta, Bijoy Krishna Ghose, Purnananda Sanyal, Manindra Nath Choudhury, Saroj Ranjan Das Kanungo, Santi Gopal Sen, Sailesh Chandra Ghose, Anath Bondhu Panja and Mrigendra Dutta and others decided to assassinate him. On 2 September 1933 Ghosh, along with Panja and Dutta shot Burge dead while he was playing a football match (Bradley-Birt football tournament) at the police grounds at Midnapore. The assassins were pursued by a Police Superintendent and Assistant Superintendent also playing. Panja was shot dead while Dutta was wounded and also died that day.

A Special Tribunal under the Bengal Criminal Law Amendment, 1925, found the survivors guilty and sentenced them to death. Chakraborty was hanged on 25 October 1934. Chakraborty and Ramkrishna were sentenced to death in 25 October.

== Death ==
Nirmal Jibon Ghosh was hanged in Medinipur Central Jail on 26 October 1934.
