= Albertha Spencer-Churchill, Duchess of Marlborough =

British aristocrat (1847–1932)

Her Grace The Duchess of Marlborough VA
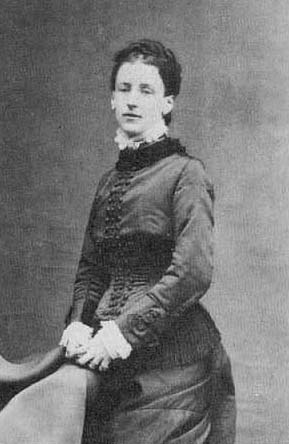
- Born: Albertha Frances Anne Hamilton; 29 July 1847
- Died: 7 January 1932 (aged 84)
- Spouse: George Spencer-Churchill, 8th Duke of Marlborough (m. 1869; div. 1883)
- Issue: Lady Frances Gresley; Charles Spencer-Churchill, 9th Duke of Marlborough; Lady Lillian Grenfell; Lady Norah Bradley-Birt
- Parents: James Hamilton, 1st Duke of Abercorn; Lady Louisa Russell

Albertha Frances Anne Spencer-Churchill, Duchess of Marlborough (née Hamilton; 29 July 1847 – 7 January 1932), was an English aristocrat and the 8th Duchess of Marlborough.

== Early life ==
She was born the sixth daughter and tenth child of James Hamilton, Earl of Abercorn, and Lady Louisa Russell, daughter of the Duke of Bedford and a close friend of Queen Victoria. She was known to her friends and family as "Goosie", and had a reputation for being highly respectable and fond of practical jokes. As a young woman, aged 18, Lady Albertha was one of eight train bearers at the wedding of The Princess Helena and Prince Christian of Schleswig-Holstein on 5 July 1866 at Windsor Castle.

== Marriage and issue ==
On 8 November 1869, Albertha married George Spencer-Churchill, Marquess of Blandford, familiarly known as 'Blandford', eldest son of John Spencer-Churchill, 7th Duke of Marlborough. This was in defiance of the wishes of George's mother, Frances Spencer-Churchill, Duchess of Marlborough, who disliked Albertha and described her as "stupid, pious and dull".

The wedding was held at the Westminster Abbey and was a double ceremony for the Hamilton family, where her sister Maud married Henry Petty-Fitzmaurice, 5th Marquess of Lansdowne. The wedding was attended by the Prince and Princess of Wales, and Albertha received a wedding gift of a "valuable Indian shawl" from Queen Victoria.

The couple had four children:

- Lady Frances Louisa Spencer-Churchill (15 September 1870 – 13 November 1954), married 6 June 1893 Sir Robert Gresley, 11th Baronet, and had issue.
- Charles Richard John Spencer-Churchill, 9th Duke of Marlborough (13 November 1871 – 30 June 1934), married firstly Consuelo Vanderbilt (they divorced in 1921) and secondly Gladys Marie Deacon. Had issue.
- Lady Lillian Maud Spencer-Churchill (9 July 1873 – 4 January 1951), married 6 October 1898 Colonel Cecil Grenfell, and had no issue.
- Lady Norah Beatrice Henriette Spencer-Churchill (1 September 1875 – 28 April 1946), married 1 December 1920 Francis Bradley Bradley-Birt, and had no issue.

== The Aylesford Affair ==
Blandford was a member of the Marlborough House set, a group of aristocrats who, at the behest of Edward, Prince of Wales regularly gathered at Marlborough House for raucous parties. It was at one of these parties that Blandford met Edith Finch, Countess of Aylesford; their affair began in 1874. In 1875, while she was pregnant with their fourth child, Albertha confronted her husband about the affair. During the ensuing argument, Blandford slapped her. The couple separated, with Albertha not allowing Blandford to see his children. In 1876, Heneage Finch, 7th Earl of Aylesford, cited Blandford as co-respondent in his divorce petition, which was eventually dropped. Queen Victoria prevailed on Prime Minister Benjamin Disraeli to help with the matter; he asked Albertha's father, then Lord Lieutenant of Ireland, to resign his post. He was created Duke of Abercorn.

A formal deed of separation was signed in 1878. But when Albertha learned that Edith was living alone in France, she assumed that the affair was over and contacted Blandford. They reunited, until Albertha discovered that, in 1881, under the name 'Mrs. Spencer', Edith had given birth to a son, who was eventually christened under the name Guy Bertram Finch. Albertha petitioned for divorce; it was granted in November 1883.

== Later life ==
In July 1883, upon the death of his father, Blandford became the 8th Duke of Marlborough. The divorce was not yet final but Albertha had been granted custody of their children. Now that their 12 year-old son Charles was heir, the court ruled that he be raised by Blandford's mother, the Dowager Duchess, at Blenheim Palace. Albertha retained visitation rights, and custody of the couple's daughters. Albertha was permitted to use the title Duchess of Marlborough but, thereafter referred to herself as Marchioness of Blandford. She did not re-marry, and died in London in 1932, age 84.

== Ancestry ==
Ancestors of Albertha Spencer-Churchill, Duchess of Marlborough

8. John Hamilton, 1st Marquess of Abercorn
4. James Hamilton, Viscount Hamilton
9. Catherine Copley
2. James Hamilton, 1st Duke of Abercorn
10. The Hon. John Douglas
5. Harriet Douglas
11. Lady Frances Lascelles
1. Albertha Spencer-Churchill, Duchess of Marlborough
12. Francis Russell, Marquess of Tavistock
6. John Russell, 6th Duke of Bedford
13. Lady Elizabeth Keppel
3. Lady Louisa Jane Russell
14. Alexander Gordon, 4th Duke of Gordon
7. Lady Georgina Gordon
15. Jane Maxwell
