= Nikunj =

Nikunj is a unisex given name. Notable people with the name include:

- Nikunj Malik, Indian actress and TV personality
- Nikunj Sen, Indian revolutionary
