= Bimal Dasgupta =

Bengali revolutionary (1910–2000)

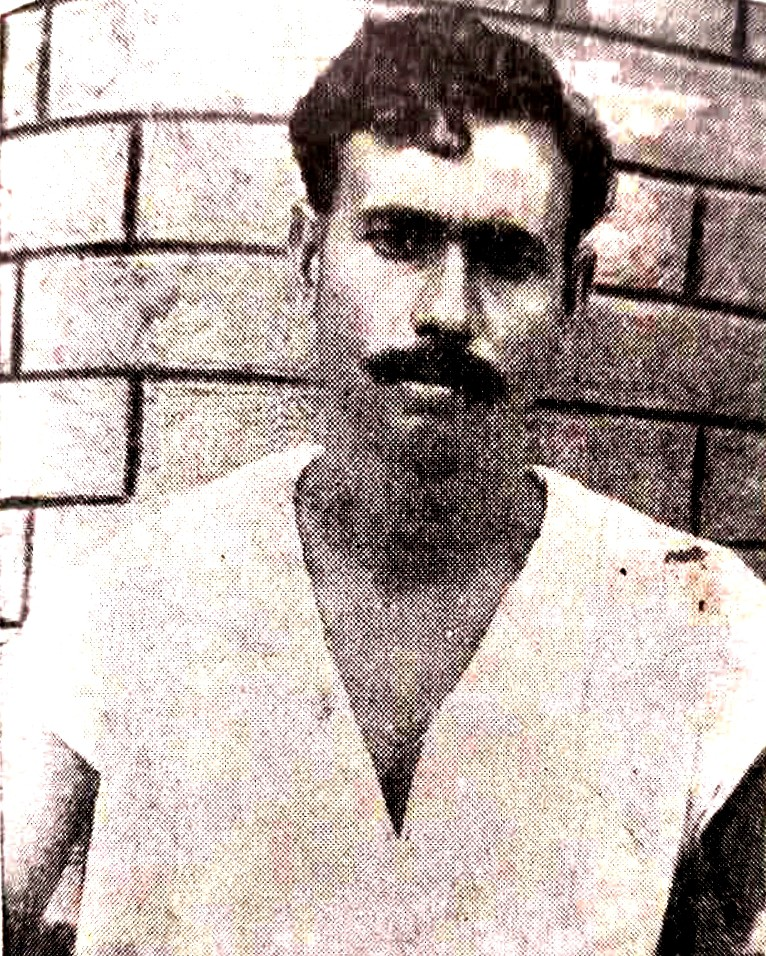
- Photograph of Bimal Dasgupta
- Born: 29 April 1910; Jhalkathi, Barishal, Bengal Presidency, British India
- Died: 3 March 2000 (aged 89); Midnapore, West Bengal, India
- Occupation: Revolutionary
- Organization: Bengal Volunteers
- Movement: Indian Freedom Movement

Bimal Dasgupta (29 April 1910 – 3 March 2000), nicknamed "Makhan", was an Indian revolutionary and member of the Bengal Volunteers who carried out assassinations against British colonial officials in an attempt to secure Indian independence.

== Family ==
Bimal Dasgupta was born in Jhalokati District, Barishal in 1910. His father was Akhyay Kumar Dasgupta, an ayurvedic doctor. His mother's name was Sushila Devi. His father came to Midnapore permanently when he was only 4 years old. His parental uncle Hiralal Dasgupta was already lived here. They were four brothers and five sisters. He joined the Bengal Volunteers, a revolutionary organisation of British India.

== Education ==
Dasgupta started his education at Mahendra babur Pathsala, Mir Bazar. Then he was admitted to the Vidyasagar Vidyapith as a class 5 student at Hindu school from class 7 to class10. Hindu school was a private school at that time. Later he came under the influence of Dinesh Gupta, who was a student of Midnapore College at that time. Dinesh Gupta came to Midnapore after the instruction of Netaji Subhas Chandra Bose and stayed with his brother Jyotish Gupta who was a lawyer in Midnapore judges court. This way Dasgupta joined the Bengal Volunteers, a revolutionary organisation of British India. His paternal uncle was Hiralal Dasgupta, headmaster of Midnapore Collegiate School. He forced his uncle to patronize a handicraft fair on collegiate school premises and continued it till 7 April.

== Revolutionary activities ==
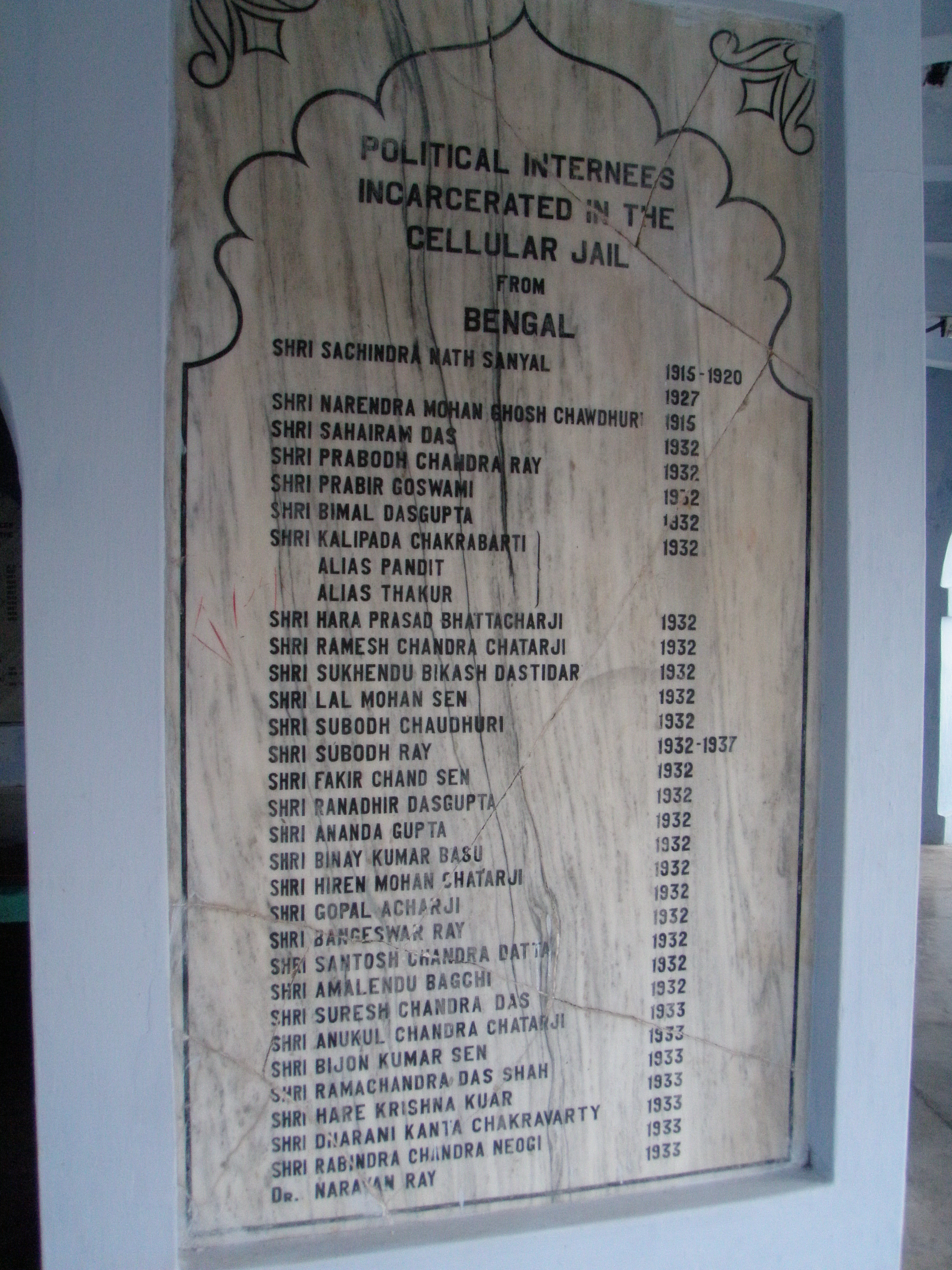
Dasgupta's name on the Andaman Cellular Jail list, Port Blair 2009

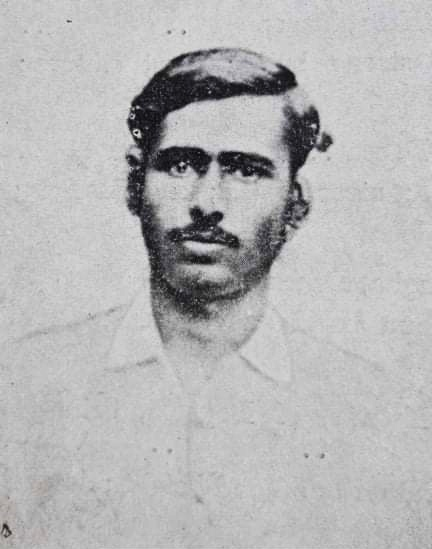
Bimal Dasgupta after release

Dinesh Gupta fought in the Battle of the Writers Buildings but somehow survived. After discussion it was decided by the Bengal Volunteers group that the first target would be James Peddie the District Magistrate of Medinipur. Peddie had earned notoriety, he would beat the salt satyagrahis to unconsciousness and even killed some of them by kicking them. He would also take unarmed women to the open streets, strip them and leave them there. A list of four names was sent to the Calcutta Headquarters of the Bengal volunteers for approval. They were Shashanka Dasgupta, Phani Kundu, Jyoti Jibon Ghosh and Bimal Dasgupta. On 7 April at around 5:00 p.m., Peddie went to the fair to distribute prizes, along with two officers, 16 police dogs and 16 bodyguards. He was busy in the exhibition when Ghosh and Dasgupta shot him. After the shootout they took a cycle and fled to the Salbani Jungle. There they boarded from two different railway stations Godapiasal and Salboni, and reached Purulia by Gomo Passenger. A revolutionary named Binod Sen aks Binod Bihari Sen from village Godapiasal helps them for this matter. After that they spent some days in Asansol and Kolkata. His uncle refused to give any information about Peddies' killers and lost his job. He worked in Jharia coalfield for some time during this period. Some days later Dasgupta was again given the responsibility of killing Villiers, chief editor of the newspaper The Statesman of Clive Street. On July 29, 1931, Dasgupta shot Villiers in his office. He got caught before he could take the cyanide out of his pocket. Police eventually found him as a defendant in the Peddie Murder case after he was assumed to be dead, as the revolutionary Kanailal Bhattacharjee, who killed R. R. Galik, a judge of the Alipore court, on 27 July 1931 and was martyred under the name of Bimal Dasgupta (or Bimal Gupta) so that the police would stop searching for the real Dasgupta. The sacrifice of Bhattacharjee, to remain anonymous and save another revolutionary from the hands of the police is rare in history. At the initiative of Netaji Subhas Chandra Bose, three barristers stood for the revolutionaries in the special tribunal. Ghosh was acquitted and during cross-examination, key witness Sushil Das said, "Peddi's killer is not Bimal Dasgupta." To save Dasgupta, Raja Narendra Lal Khan of Medinipur had instructed Das to say this. Although Dasgupta was acquitted of the murder of Peddie, he was sentenced to ten years in prison in the Villiers murder case.

== Prison Life ==
In the middle of 1932, Dasgupta was sent to the Andaman Cellular Jail. In 1936 he went on a hunger strike to demand the status of a political prisoner. The fast was called off with the mediation of Subhash Chandra Bose and Muzaffar Ahmad. He was repatriated in 1938 but was not released. Dasgupta spent four years in various prisons on the mainland of Bengal.

== Last life ==
After being freed in 1942 he was looking after the land in his home in Medinipur. He worked as a sales inspector of Anandabazar newspaper after independence.

== Death ==
Bimal Dasgupta died on March 3, 2000.
