= Anath Bondhu Panja =

Indian revolutionary (1911–1933)

Anathbandhu Panja
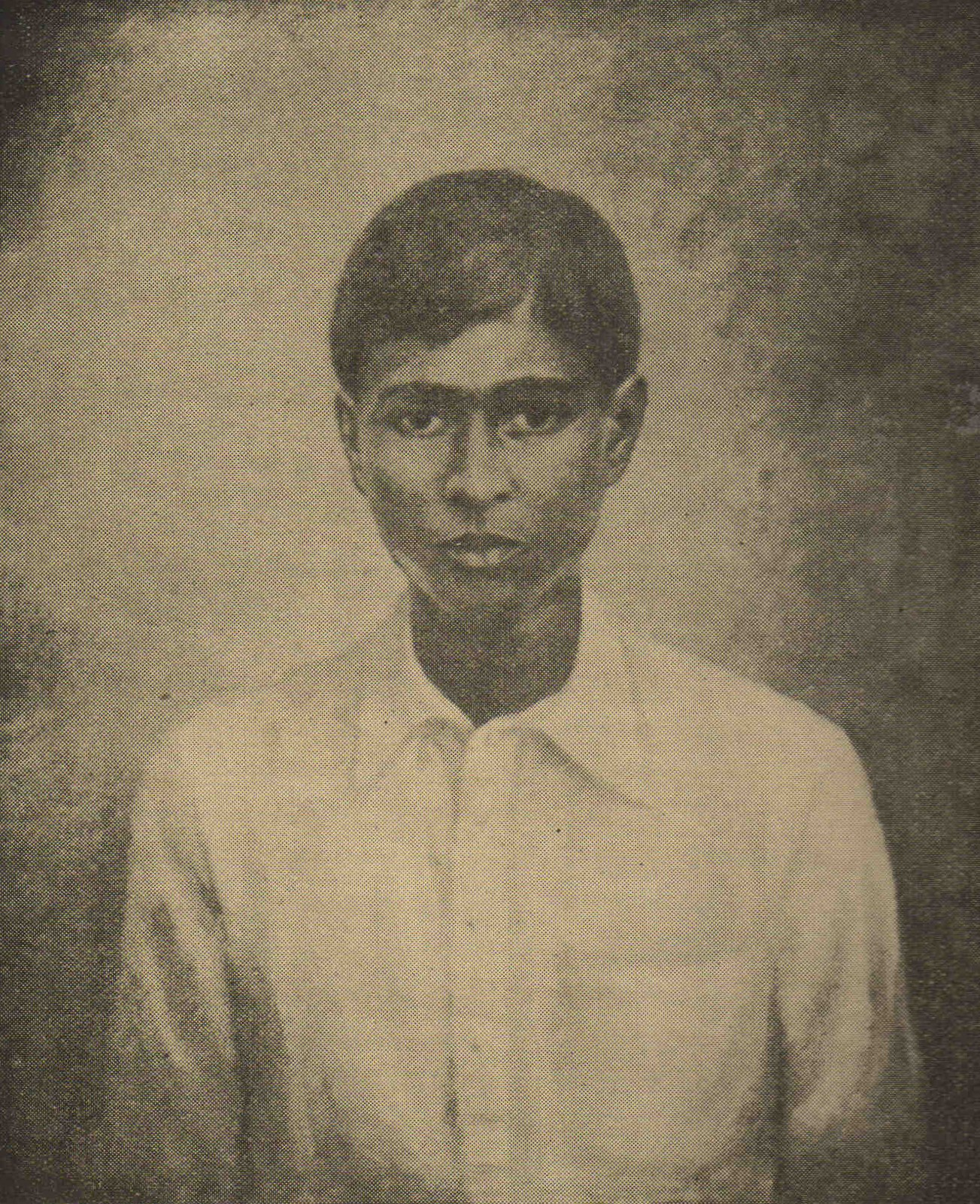
- Born: 29 October 1911; Jalabindu, Midnapore, Bengal Presidency, British India
- Died: 2 September 1933 (aged 21); Midnapore, Bengal Presidency, British India
- Occupation: Revolutionary
- Organization: Bengal Volunteers
- Movement: Indian independence movement

Anathbandhu Panja (29 October 1911 – 2 September 1933) was an Indian revolutionary and member of the Bengal Volunteers who carried out assassinations against British colonial officials in an attempt to secure Indian independence.

== Early life ==
Panja was born in a poor Mahishya family at Jalabindu Village in Sabang, Paschim Medinipur in 1911. Surendra Nath Panja and Kumudini Devi were his parents. He lost his father at the age of three and lived with his mother and elder brother. He completed his early education from Bhuban Pal's Village Pathsala and then he went with his mother to Midnapore Town and got admitted in Sujaganj Primary School. Subsequently, he was admitted to Midnapore Town School but he could not continue his studies due to his economic hardahips. He joined Bengal Volunteers, a revolutionary organisation of British India and under the direction of the organisation he got admitted at the Midnapore Collegiate School. At that time he was a member of Ballabhpur Gymnasium Club. He accompanied Nirmal Jibon Ghosh, Brajakishore Chakraborty, Mrigendra Dutta and Ramkrishna Roy to Calcutta to learn how to fire a pistol and subsequently returned to Midnapore to join the Indian independence movement.

== Revolutionary activities ==
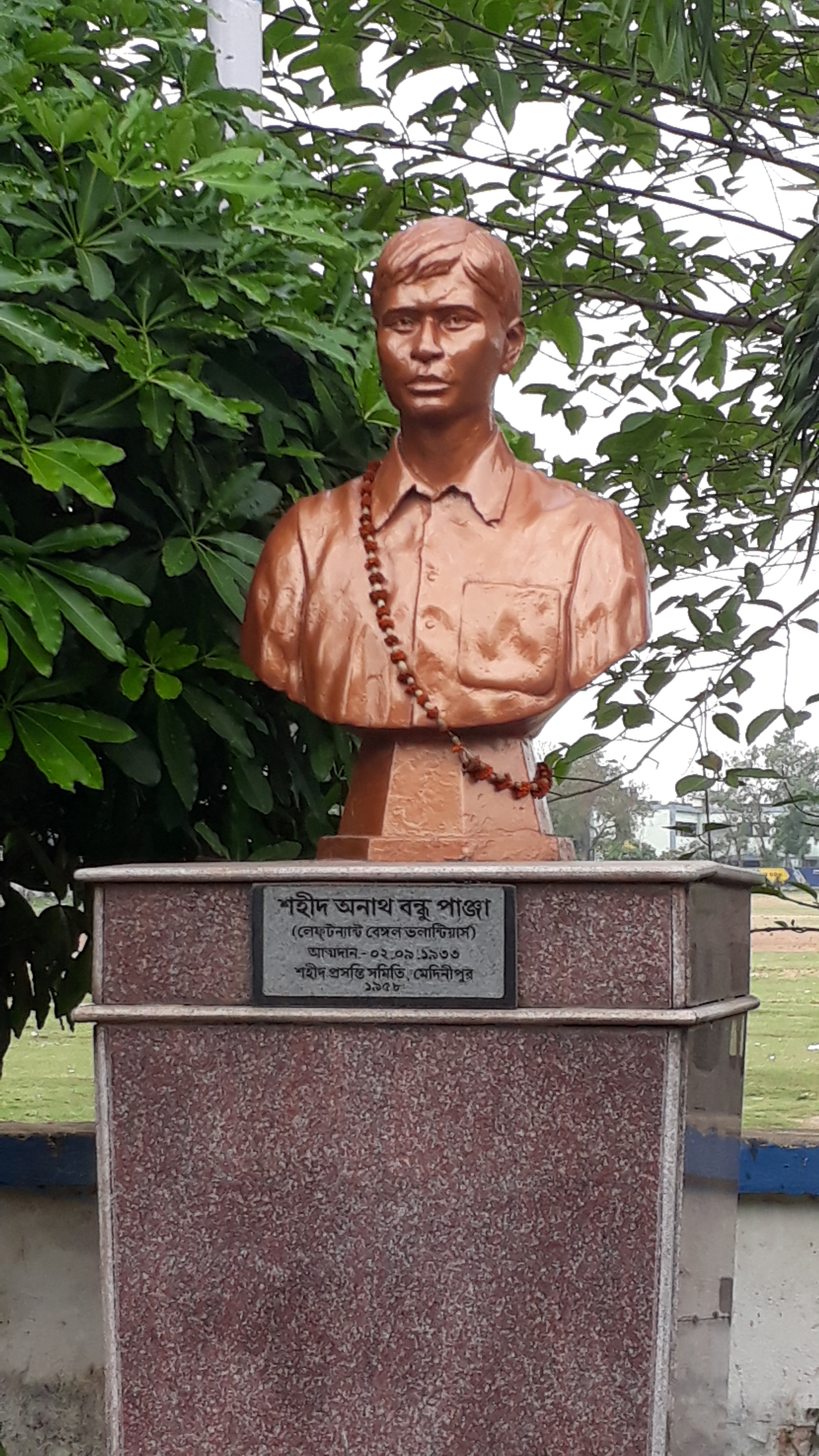
Statue of Anath Bondhu Panja near his alma mater, the Midnapore Collegiate School.

After the assassination of two previous District Magistrates James Peddy and Robert Douglas, no British officer was ready to take charge of Midnapore district. Bernard E. J. Burge, a ruthless District Magistrate and former soldier, was posted to Midnapore. Members of the Bengal Volunteers, Ramkrishna Roy, Brajakishore Chakraborty, Prabhanshu Sekhar Pal, Kamakhya Charan Ghosh, Sonatan Roy, Nanda Dulal Singh, Sukumar Sen Gupta, Bijoy Krishna Ghose, Purnananda Sanyal, Manindra Nath Choudhury, Saroj Ranjan Das Kanungo, Santi Gopal Sen, Sailesh Chandra Ghose, Anath Bondhu Panja, Mrigendra Dutta and others decided to assassinate him.

On 2 September 1933 Ghosh, along with Panja and Dutta, shot Burge dead during the half time of a football match when Burge was stepping from a car to take part in the game. Panja was killed instantly by a bodyguard, the assassins were pursued by a Police Superintendent and Assistant Superintendent playing. Dutta was wounded and also died that day.

A Special Tribunal under the Bengal Criminal Law Amendment, 1925, found the survivors guilty and sentenced them to death. Nirmal Jiban Ghosh, Brajakishore Chakraborty and Ram Krishna Roy were all sentenced to death. Bijoy Krishna Ghose, Purnanandu Sanyal, Manindra Nath Choudhury and Saroj Ranjan Das Kanungo were found not guilty of the charges against them.

The rest of the accused: Santi Gopal Sen, Kamakhya Charan Ghosh, Sonatan Roy, Nanda Dulal Singh, Sukumar Sen Gupta, Prabhanshu Sekhar Pal, Sailesh Chandra Ghose were found guilty and were sent to Jail.

Anath Bondhu Panja was acquitted of murder.

== Death ==
Anathbandhu was killed instantly by the body guard of the District Magistrate on 2 September 1933.

== Legacy ==
A school near his village is named after him as Harirhat Anath Smriti Girls' High School. A statue of Panja was founded near Midnapore Collegiate School. He recently featured on the news, when the Vidyasagar University, in a question paper of history, controversially referred to the members of the Bengal Volunteers, including Anath Bondhu as "terrorists" for their role in the assassinations of the District magistrates of Midnapore district, which resulted in a huge backlash.
