= Jyoti Jibon Ghosh =

Bengali revolutionary (1910–1968)

- Born: 1910; Hoogli, British India
- Died: 1968 (aged 57–58); Jharkhand
- Occupation: Revolutionary
- Organization: Bengal Volunteers
- Movement: Indian Freedom Movement

Jyoti Jibon Ghosh (1910 – 1968), was an Indian revolutionary and member of the Bengal Volunteers who carried out assassinations against British colonial officials in an attempt to secure Indian independence. He is a close associate of revolutionary Dinesh Gupta.

== Family ==
Ghosh was born in Dhamasin village, Hooghly district in 1910. His father was Jamini Jibon Ghosh. He enrolled in I.Sc. in Midnapore College and joined the Bengal Volunteers, a revolutionary organisation in British India. His family joined the Indian freedom movement. His brother Prof. Binoy Jibon Ghosh was dismissed from service for having a connection with the Swadeshi movement. Another brother Naba Jibon Ghosh committed suicide while imprisoned by the British. His younger brother Nirmal Jibon Ghosh was also a freedom fighter.

== Revolutionary activities ==
Dinesh Gupta fought in the Battle of the Writers Building's Verandah and survived. After discussion it was decided by the Bengal Volunteers group that the first target would be District Magistrate James Peddy. Peddy would beat the salt satyagrahis to unconsciousness and killed some of them by kicking them. Further, he kicked unarmed women on the open streets, beat them and left them. A list of four names was sent to the Calcutta Headquarters of the Bengal volunteers for approval. They were Shashanka Dasgupta, Phani Kundu, Ghosh, and Bimal Dasgupta. On 7 April at around 5:00 p.m Peddy came to the fair with two officers, 16 trained police dogs, and 16 body guards for prize distribution. He was busy in the exhibition when Ghosh and Dasgupta shot at him. After the shootout they snatched a cycle and fled to the Salbani Jungle, there they boarded at different railway stations and reached Purulia. After that they spent some days in Asansol and Kolkata. Dasgupta's uncle Hiralal Dasgupta refused to give information about Peddys' killers and lost his job. He worked in Jharia coalfield for a period.

== After independence ==
After the murder of Bernard E. J. Burge, District Magistrate for Midnapur, Ghosh was a suspect, and imprisoned for some time (till 1946). His brother Nirmal Jibon Ghosh was hanged in Medinipur Central Jail on 26 October 1934. His family did not allow him to make contact with the Bengal Volunteers group. He later stayed with his brother Binoy Jiban Ghosh in Kolkata.

After independence he spend his life as monk later he made contact with Ananta Singh, a former revolutionary who participated in the Chittagong armoury raid in 1930. This period of his life is controversial. In the 1960s banks were frequently robbed in Calcutta, where Singh's name featured. He published a series of writings in local papers still remembering and revering the revolutionary nationalists. His family told Bimal Dasgupta that he had committed suicide. Although it is said that after regular police harassment he and most of the members of his group, fled (in 1964) to a forest near Jaduguda in the present-day Jharkhand state in late 1960s, where he died.
