= Lady Norah Bradley-Birt =

British aristocrat

Lady Norah Bradley-Birt VA
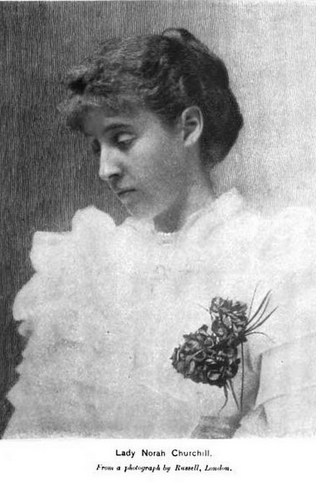
- Norah Spencer-Churchill, from an 1895 publication
- Born: Norah Beatrice Henriette Spencer-Churchill; 1 September 1875 Blenheim Palace, Woodstock, Oxfordshire, England
- Died: 28 April 1946 (aged 70) Hove, Sussex, England
- Occupation: Writer
- Spouse: Francis Bradley Bradley-Birt
- Parents: George Spencer-Churchill, 8th Duke of Marlborough; Lady Albertha Hamilton

Lady Norah Beatrice Henriette Bradley-Birt VA (née Spencer-Churchill; 1 September 1875 – 28 April 1946) was an English aristocrat and educationalist.

== Biography ==
Bradley-Birt was born in 1875 at Blenheim Palace, Woodstock, Oxfordshire. She was the youngestdaughter of George Charles Spencer-Churchill, 8th Duke of Marlborough and Albertha Spencer-Churchill, Duchess of Marlborough. Her parents wedding was attended by the Edward VII, then Prince of Wales and Alexandra of Denmark, Princess of Wales.

She married Francis Bradley Bradley-Birt, diplomat of the Indian Civil Service and Bengal Commission, on 1 December 1920 at the Chapel Royal in St James's Palace, London. She continued to use her maiden name after her marriage to avoid confusion with another family member. Bradley-Birt and her husband were known for their writings and social work for British India.

Bradley-Birt's brother Charles Spencer-Churchill, 9th Duke of Marlborough, succeeded their father as Duke of Marlborough.

She died in 1946 in Hove, Sussex, aged 70.

== Siblings ==
- Lady Frances Spencer-Churchill (1870–1954).
- Charles Spencer-Churchill, 9th Duke of Marlborough (1871–1934).
- Lady Lilian Spencer-Churchill (1873–1951).
