= George Spencer-Churchill, 8th Duke of Marlborough =

British duke (1844–1892)

His Grace The Duke of Marlborough DL
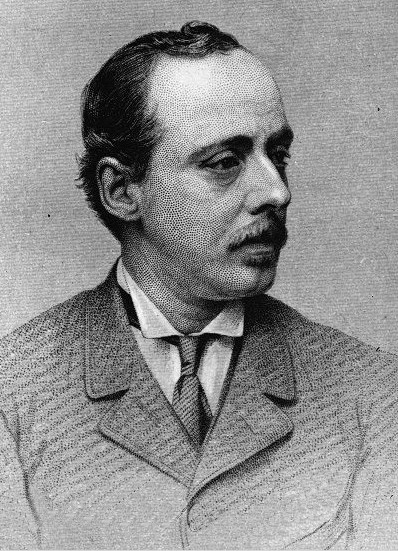
- The Duke of Marlborough, 1876.

Member of the House of Lords
- In office 16 April 1883 – 9 November 1892
- Preceded by: John Spencer-Churchill
- Succeeded by: Charles Spencer-Churchill

Personal details
- Born: George Charles Spencer-Churchill; 13 May 1844 England
- Died: 9 November 1892 (aged 48) Blenheim Palace, Woodstock, Oxfordshire, England
- Spouses: Lady Albertha Hamilton (m. 1869; div. 1883) Lillian Warren Price (m. 1888)
- Children: Lady Frances Gresley; Charles Spencer-Churchill, 9th Duke of Marlborough; Lady Lillian Grenfell; Lady Norah Bradley-Birt; Guy Bertrand Spencer
- Parents: John Spencer-Churchill, 7th Duke of Marlborough; Lady Frances Vane

George Charles Spencer-Churchill, 8th Duke of Marlborough (13 May 1844 – 9 November 1892), styled Earl of Sunderland until 1857 and Marquess of Blandford between 1857 and 1883, was a British peer.

== Early life ==
Marlborough was born in England on 13 May 1844. He was the eldest son of John Spencer-Churchill, 7th Duke of Marlborough (1822–1883), who served as Lord Lieutenant of Ireland and Lord President of the Council, and Lady Frances Vane (1822–1899). He was the elder brother of Lord Randolph Churchill and the uncle of Winston Churchill.

His paternal grandparents were George Spencer-Churchill, 6th Duke of Marlborough, and Lady Jane Stewart, daughter of Admiral George Stewart, 8th Earl of Galloway. His maternal grandparents were Charles Vane, 3rd Marquess of Londonderry, and Frances Vane, Marchioness of Londonderry.

Like his father before him, he was educated at Eton College, entering in 1857 and being expelled in 1860.

== Career ==
In 1863 Marlborough joined the British Army, purchasing a commission in the rank of Lieutenant in the Royal Horse Guards. He was initiated into the Freemasonry in January 1871 along with his brother Randolph, in the Churchill Lodge in London but resigned in 1872. In the following years, he was also initiated into the Ancient Order of Druids.

After succeeding to the Dukedom, Marlborough sold the family holdings at Wolvercote and Godstow in 1884.

== Personal life ==
Marlborough was married twice. On 8 November 1869, he married Lady Albertha Hamilton, daughter of James Hamilton, 1st Duke of Abercorn, at the Palace of Westminster. She was unkindly described by her mother-in-law as "stupid, pious and dull". They divorced on 20 November 1883, shortly after Marlborough inherited the dukedom upon the death of his father, having parented four children:

- Lady Frances Louisa Spencer-Churchill (1870–1954), who married Sir Robert Gresley, 11th Baronet, on 6 June 1893, and had issue.
- Charles Richard John Spencer-Churchill, 9th Duke of Marlborough (1871–1934)
- Lady Lillian Maud Spencer-Churchill (1873–1951), who married Colonel Cecil Grenfell on 6 October 1898, and had two daughters.
- Lady Norah Beatrice Henriette Spencer-Churchill (1875–1946), who married Francis Bradley Bradley-Birt on 1 December 1920, and had issue.

While married to Albertha, he fathered an illegitimate son, Guy Bertrand, later known as Guy Bertrand Spencer (born on 4 November 1881), by Edith Peers Williams who was still married to Heneage Finch, 7th Earl of Aylesford. In an attempt to pressure Lord Aylesford to drop his divorce suit, Lady Aylesford and Marlborough's younger brother, Lord Randolph Churchill, threatened the Princess of Wales that they would subpoena the Prince of Wales (who was touring India at the time) as a witness in the divorce.

- Guy Bertrand Spencer, whom Marlborough reportedly cared more for than his legitimate children, worked in a brewery. He married, in 1910, Lily Blanche Minnie Saville (1876–1953), who was a coachman's daughter. Spencer served in the Royal Garrison Artillery during World War I. At the end of his life he lived at 2 Glaziers Lane, Normandy, Surrey, England, and died in hospital at Knaphill, Woking, Surrey, on 31 March 1950.

Marlborough married his second wife, Lilian "Lily" Warren Price, the widow of Louis Carré Hammersley, a New York real-estate millionaire, and a daughter of retired United States Navy Commodore Cicero Price. The civil marriage took place on 29 June 1888 at New York City Hall, with the ceremony officiated by the Mayor of New York City, Abram Hewitt. A religious ceremony followed the same day, in the chancel of Tabernacle Baptist Church and presided over by its minister, Daniel C. Potter. They had no children.

The 8th Duke of Marlborough died in 1892, aged 48 at Blenheim Palace, and was succeeded by his only legitimate son, Charles.

== Gallery ==
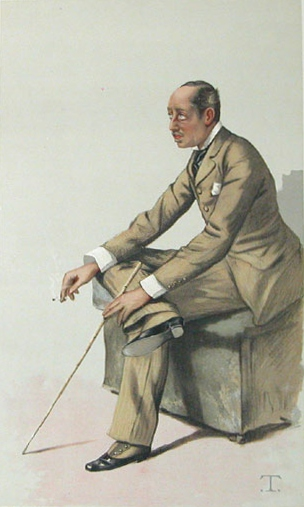
The Marquess of Blandford in Vanity Fair, 18 June 1881.

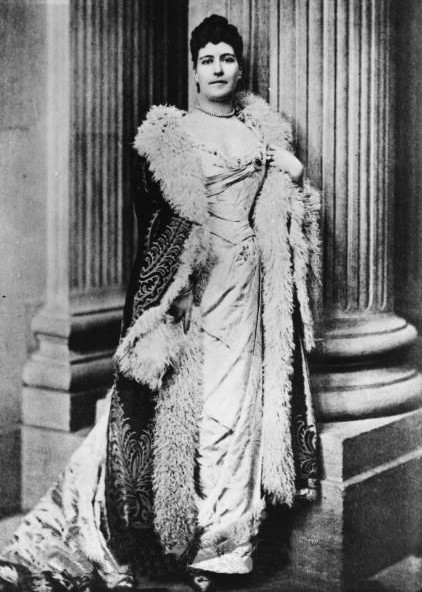
Lilian Warren Price.

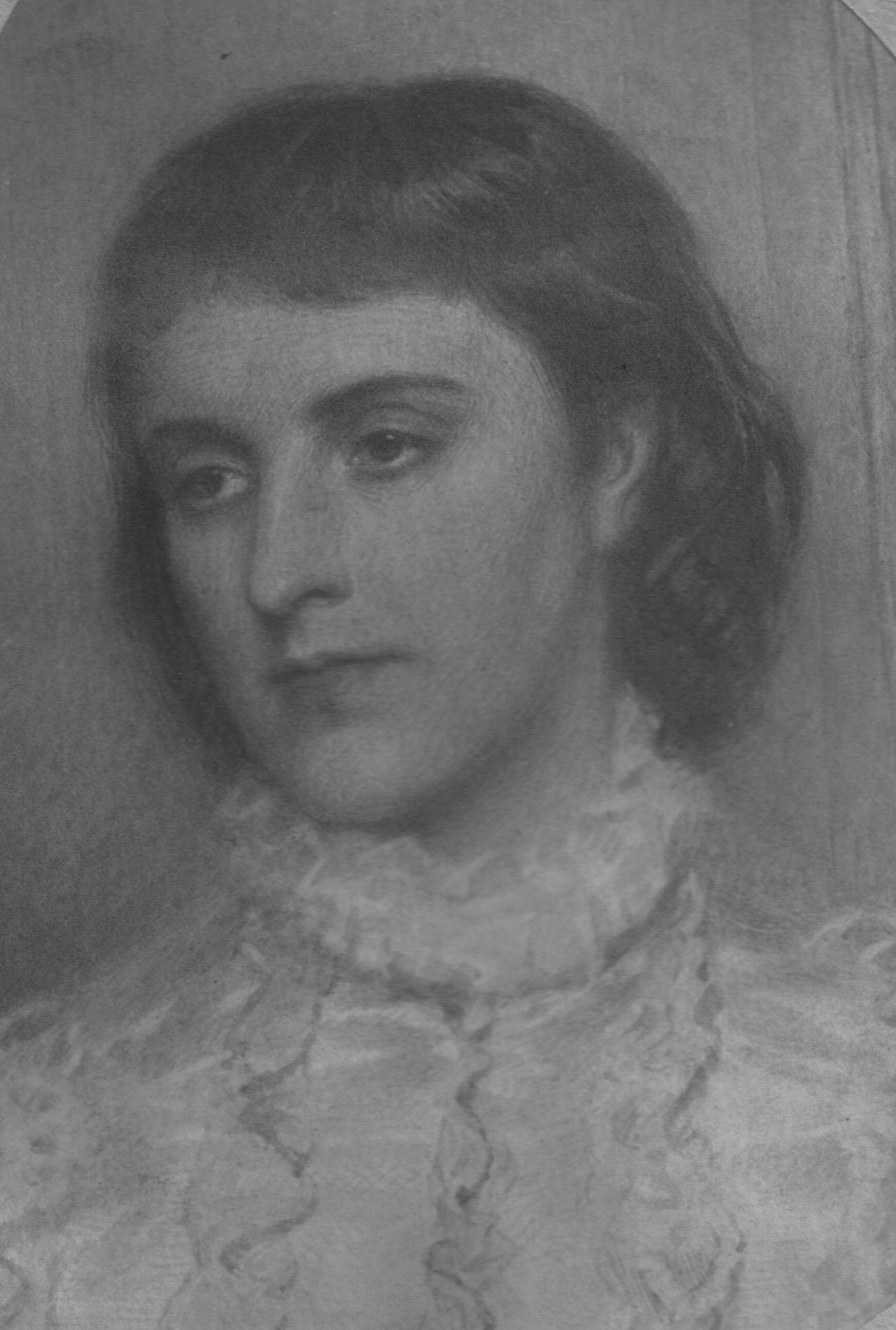
Edith Peers-Williams.

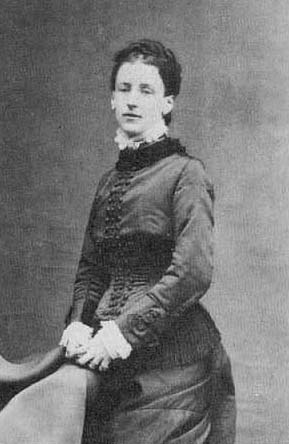
Lady Albertha Hamilton, his first wife.

== See also ==
- List of Freemasons

Peerage of England
Preceded by John Spencer-Churchill	Duke of Marlborough; 1883–1892; Member of the House of Lords (1883–1892)	Succeeded by Charles Spencer-Churchill
