= Nikunj Sen =

Bengali revolutionary (1906–1986)

Nikunja Sen
- Born: 01 October 1906; British India
- Died: 2 July 1986 (aged 79); Kolkata India
- Occupation: Revolutionary
- Organization: Bengal Volunteers
- Movement: Indian Freedom Movement

Nikunja Sen (1 October 1906 – 2 July 1986) was an Indian revolutionary and member of the Bengal Volunteers who carried out assassinations against British colonial officials in an attempt to secure Indian independence.

== Early life Education ==
Nikunja Sen was born on October 1, 1906, in Kamarkhara, Dhaka, Bangladesh. He studied there and later earned his B.A. from Dhaka University. After graduating, he went to Calcutta to pursue an M.A. However, from his student life, he was a strong supporter of the anti-British independence movement. . During this time, he was involved in organizing Subhas Chandra Bose's Forward Bloc. Eventually, he joined the Socialist Republican Party led by Sarat Chandra Bose. The party's mouthpiece, 'Mahajati', was published under his editorship. He was also associated with Jyotish Joardar's 'Nishana' and 'Subhash Sanskriti Parishad'.

== Revolutionary activities ==
He joined the Mukti Sangha of the Jugantar Dal later. The Jugantar Dal was a secret association of revolutionaries founded by Hemchandra Ghosh, an anti-British revolutionary in Dhaka. Nikunja Sen later became a member of Netaji Subhas Chandra Bose's Bengal Volunteers.He was sent to Comilla to strengthen the party under the leadership of Lalit Barman. As a result of his and Lalit Barman's revolutionary efforts, two of his acquaintances, Shanti Ghosh and Suniti Chowdhury, who were classmates at Faizunnesa Girls' School in Comilla, were inspired. They killed Mr. Stevens, the District Magistrate of Comilla, on December 14, 1931.Nikunja Sen, however, joined Banaripara School in Bikrampur, Dhaka, with the intention of strengthening the party and organization through teaching. There, he met Badal Gupta, whose real name was Sudhir Gupta, as a student. Nikunj Sen inspired Badal to develop patriotism. Badal also joined the Bengal Volunteers.The target of the revolutionaries was Colonel N.S. Simpson, the tyrannical Inspector General of the prison authorities. Simpson was notorious to the revolutionaries for his atrocities on political prisoners. With the murder of Simpson, an unprecedented decision was made to create panic within the British government. It was decided that Simpson would be killed in his office. The revolutionaries planned to attack the then-secretariat, the Writers' Building in Calcutta (now known as Mahakaran, located in B.B.D. Bagh).It was decided that Binoy Basu would lead the team, accompanied by Badal Gupta and Dinesh Gupta (1911–1931). On December 8, 1930, Binoy Bose, Badal Gupta, and Dinesh Gupta entered the Writers' Building in European attire and shot Simpson dead. Nikunja Sen was not only a close associate of theirs but also played an important role in the planning and preparation of the campaign. He was not captured during the operation and went into hiding. He was arrested in 1931 and imprisoned for seven years. He was subsequently arrested again in 1940 during World War II and released in 1946

== Later life ==
After independence, he was one of the founders and the headmaster of Saptagram Sarveshwar High School in Bagu village of North 24 Parganas district for a long time. Due to his excellent organizational talents, he became the editor of 'Palli Niketan' in the seven villages of Samaj Seva Kendra, including Bagu, Shikharpur, Nayabad, etc.

== Literary works ==
Nikunja Sen was an eloquent speaker as well as a prolific writer. Some of his books include:

- Jailkhana Karagar (2023), Patralekha, Calcutta Edition ISBN 978-93-94618-39-8
- Boxer After Deoli (1969) (2022 edition Radical Impressions Kolkata) ISBN 978-81-950682-0-3
- Economic Interpretation in History
- Netaji and Marxism
