= Brajakishore Chakraborty =

Indian revolutionary (1913–1934)

Brojokishore Chakraborty
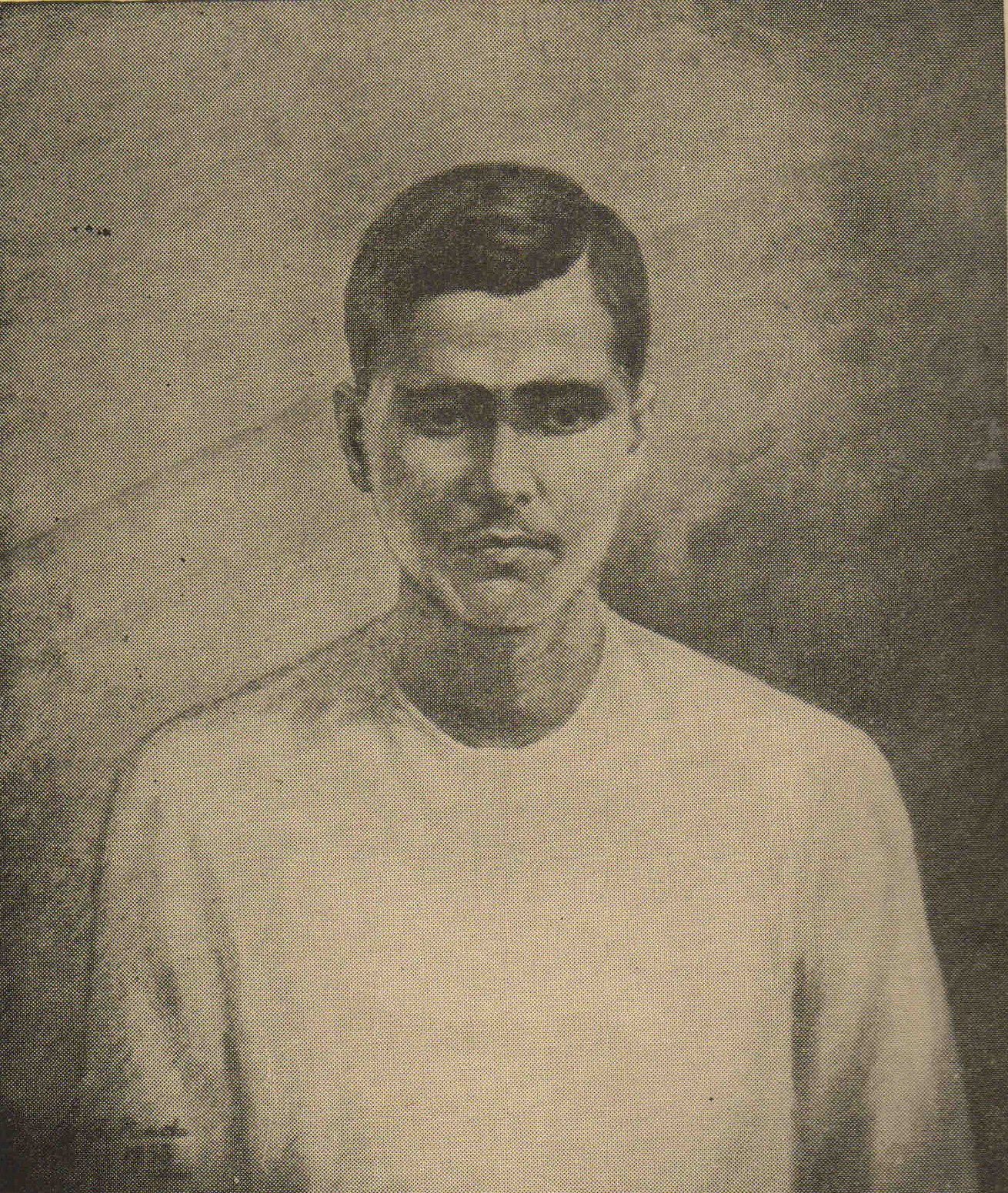
- Born: 1913; Ballavpur, Midnapore , British India
- Died: 25 October 1934 (aged 20–21); Midnapore Central Jail, Midnapore, Bengal Presidency, British India
- Cause of death: Execution by hanging
- Occupation: Revolutionary
- Organization: Bengal Volunteers
- Movement: Indian independence movement

Brojokishore Chakraborty (1913 – 25 October 1934) was an Indian revolutionary and member of the Bengal Volunteers who carried out assassinations of British colonial officials in an attempt to secure Indian independence. He was hanged on 25 October 1934 along with Ramkrishna Roy for the assassination of District Magistrate Bernard E. J. Burge in 1933.

== Family ==
Brojokishore Chakraborty was born in Ballavpur (Paschim Medinipur) in 1913. His father's name was Upendranath Chakraborty. He joined the Bengal Volunteers, a revolutionary organisation of British India.

== Revolutionary activities ==
After the murders of two previous District Magistrates James Peddy and Robert Douglas, no British officer was ready to take charge of Midnapore district. Former soldier Bernard E. J. Burge was then posted to Midnapore district. Members of the Bengal Volunteers: Ramkrishna Roy, Brajakishore Chakraborty, Prabhanshu Sekhar Pal, Kamakhya Charan Ghosh, Sonatan Roy, Nanda Dulal Singh, Sukumar Sen Gupta, Bijoy Krishna Ghose, Purnananda Sanyal, Manindra Nath Choudhury, Saroj Ranjan Das Kanungo, Santi Gopal Sen, Sailesh Chandra Ghose, Anath Bondhu Panja and Mrigendra Dutta decided to assassinate him. Roy, Chakraborty, Nirmal Jibon Ghosh and Dutta planned to shoot Burge dead while he was playing in a football match (Bradley-Birt football tournament) at the police grounds of Midnapore. On 2 September 1933 during the half time of the football match on the police parade ground, Burge was shot and killed by Panja and Dutta. Panja was killed instantly by one of Burges' bodyguards. Dutta was also shot and died in hospital the next day. Anath Bondhu Panja and Mrigendra Dutta were acquitted of the murder of Magistrate Burge.

== Death ==
Chakraborty was executed by hanging on 25 October 1934, as was Ramkrishna Roy, for the assassination of Magistrate Burge.
