= Hooghly Mohsin College =

Undergraduate college of West Bengal, India

- Entrance view of Hooghly Mohsin College, Chinsurah
- Type: Undergraduate & Postgraduate college
- Established: 1836; 190 years ago
- Affiliations: University of Burdwan
- Principal: Dr. Purushottam Pramanik
- Location: Chinsurah, Hooghly, West Bengal, 712101, India; 22.8828709°N 88.3999024°E
- Campus: Urban
- Website: www.hooghlymohsincollege.ac.in
- Location within West Bengal Location within India

Hooghly Mohsin College, established in 1836 after the Macaulay Report, is one of the oldest colleges in India. It offers undergraduate and postgraduate courses in Arts, Commerce and Sciences. It is affiliated to the University of Burdwan.

== History ==
Hooghly Mohsin College (HMC) began on 1 August 1836 as the New Hooghly College. It was established by Muhammad Mohsin, who also started other colleges. On its 100th anniversary it was renamed Hooghly Mohsin College. It became affiliated to University of Calcutta since the latter's initiation in 1857. After the establishment of the University of Burdwan in 1960, the college became its constituent.

== Departments and courses ==
The college offers different undergraduate and postgraduate courses and aims at imparting education to the undergraduates of lower- and middle-class people of Chinsurah and its adjoining areas.

=== Science ===
Science faculty consists of the departments of Chemistry, Physics, Mathematics, Botany, Zoology, Physiology, Geology, and Economics.

=== Arts & Commerce ===
Arts and Commerce faculty consists of departments of Bengali, English, Sanskrit, Hindi, Urdu, History, Political Science, Philosophy, and Commerce (Accountancy).

== Accreditation ==
Recently, Hooghly Mohsin College has been awarded B++ grade by the National Assessment and Accreditation Council (NAAC). The college is recognized by the University Grants Commission (UGC).

Hooghly Mohsin has been recognized by the University Grants Commission as a "College with Potential for Excellence." The Department of Biotechnology, government of India, has been recognized as a "STAR COLLEGE." The Department of Science & Technology, government of India, has selected this college under "Fund for Improvement of Science & Technology Infrastructure" (DST-FIST) scheme.

== Notable alumni ==
- Muzaffar Ahmed, politician
- Upendranath Brahmachari, scientist
- Bankim Chandra Chattopadhyay, composer and writer
- Sanjib Chandra Chattopadhyay, writer
- Kanailal Dutta, revolutionary
- Shyamal Mitra, singer
- Surajit Sengupta, footballer
- Ashutosh Mukhopadhyay, author
- Tapas Paul, actor and politician
- Dwijendralal Ray, writer
- Brahmabandhav Upadhyay, theologian
- Abu Mohammed Habibullah, historian

== Sports Accolades ==
- The college has produced many eminent sports person who has represented in national and international arena, like in Football, Surajit Sengupta, Swarup Das, Goutam Ghosh, Anit Ghosh, Athletics - Monoranjan Porel and Amit Saha and in Cricket - Prosenjit Ganguly (Bengal Ranji trophy).

== See also ==
- Education in India
- Education in West Bengal
- James Esdaile
- List of institutions of higher education in West Bengal
