= Vidyasagar Vidyapith =

Coordinates: 22°25′4.3″N 87°19′34.95″E

- Midnapore, West Bengal; India

Information
- Type: School
- Established: 1845
- School district: Paschim Medinipur

Vidyasagar Vidyapith Boys' School, popularly known as Bangla School, is one of the oldest school located in Midnapore town, West Bengal, India. This school was established with the blessings of Ishwar Chandra Vidyasagar, the 19th century educationist and social reformer of Bengal, on 22 August 1845. In 2011 this institution was declared a "Heritage School" by the heritage commission, government of West Bengal.

The school follows the course curricula of West Bengal Board of Secondary Education (WBBSE) and West Bengal Council of Higher Secondary Education (WBCHSE) for Standard 10th and 12th Board examinations respectively.

The school celebrated the 150th year of its existence on 22 August 1994. The ceremony was graced by Raghunath Reddy, then Governor of West Bengal.

== Notable alumni ==
- Bimal Dasgupta-freedom fighter
