= Cecil Grenfell =

British soldier and Liberal politician

Grenfell, circa 1910

Colonel Cecil Alfred Grenfell (13 February 1864 – 11 August 1924), was a British soldier and Liberal Party politician who was MP for Bodmin between the two general elections of 1910.

== Background ==
Grenfell was the son of Pascoe du Pré Grenfell, of Wilton Park, Beaconsfield, Buckinghamshire, grandson of Pascoe Grenfell. His mother was Sophia (née Grenfell). Cecil Grenfell was one of fifteen recorded children born to Pascoe and Sophia. His schooling included time at Eton. He married Lady Lilian Maud Spencer-Churchill, daughter of George Spencer-Churchill, 8th Duke of Marlborough, in 1898. They had two daughters.

Grenfell was a member of the Stock Exchange and rode in the 1896 Grand National.

Of his eight brothers; three died in battle. Lieutenant Robert Septimus Grenfell died in a cavalry charge at the Battle of Omdurman in 1898 and his two youngest brothers (twins) were both killed in the First World War. One of the twins, Francis Octavius Grenfell received the Victoria Cross in 1914, but was killed in 1915. He died in August 1924, aged 60. His wife survived him by 27 years and died in January 1951, aged 77.

== Professional career ==
Grenfell was appointed a captain in the Buckinghamshire Yeomanry on 9 March 1898. Following the outbreak of the Second Boer War in South Africa, he was in February 1900 seconded for active service with the Imperial Yeomanry, where he was on 3 February 1900 commissioned a lieutenant with the temporary rank of Lieutenant in the Army. He returned to the Buckinghamshire Yeomanry, where he was promoted to major on 23 December 1902. He was later promoted to colonel.

== Political career ==
Grenfell was selected as Liberal candidate for the Rochester division of Kent for the 1895 General Election. This was a Conservative seat that the Liberals won in the 1889 by-election only to lose in 1892. He was unsuccessful. He was selected as Liberal candidate for the Bodmin division of Cornwall for the January 1910 General Election. Bodmin had been in Liberal hands since 1906 but otherwise had been Liberal Unionist. He managed to hold the seat with a majority of just 50 votes. He chose not to stand again at the December 1910 election when the seat was regained by the Liberal Unionists. He did not stand for parliament again.

=== Electoral record ===
General election 1895: Rochester
Party	Candidate	Votes	%	±%
Conservative	James Gascoyne-Cecil	2,152	56.3	+1.0
Liberal	Cecil Grenfell	1,673	43.7	−1.0
Majority		479	12.6	+2.0
Turnout		3,825	87.4	−3.6
Registered electors		4,378		
Conservative hold		Swing	+1.0	

General election January 1910: Bodmin
Party	Candidate	Votes	%	±%
Liberal	Cecil Grenfell	5,133	50.2	−6.1
Liberal Unionist	Reginald Pole-Carew	5,083	49.8	+6.1
Majority		50	0.4	−12.2
Turnout		10,216	88.4	+2.4
Registered electors		11,553		
Liberal hold		Swing	−6.1	

Parliament of the United Kingdom
Preceded by Freeman Freeman-Thomas	Member of Parliament for Bodmin; January 1910 – December 1910	Succeeded by Sir Reginald Pole-Carew
