= Sanjib Chandra Chattopadhyay =

Indian writer (1834–1889)

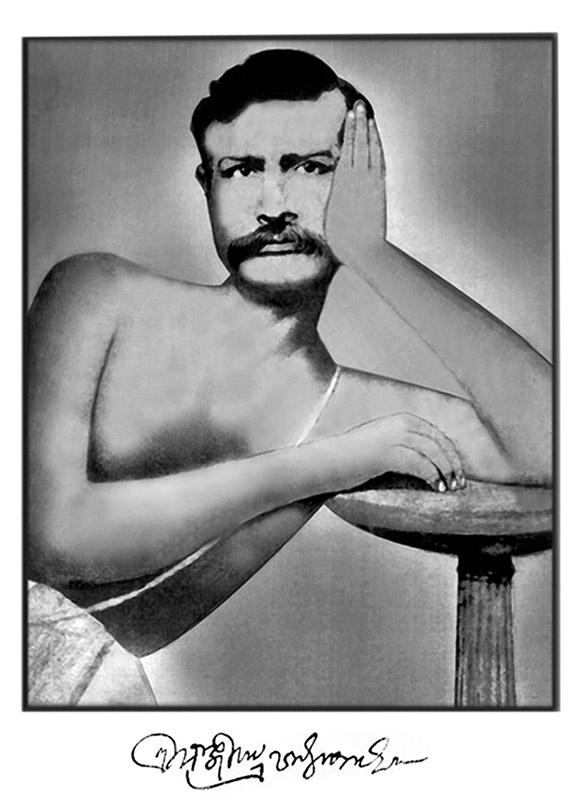
- Born: 1834; Naihati, Bengal Presidency, British India
- Died: 18 April 1889 (aged 54–55); Calcutta, Bengal Presidency, British India
- Education: University of Calcutta
- Occupations: Magistrate, writer, lecturer
- Writing career
- Genres: Poet, novelist, essayist, journalist
- Subject: Literature
- Notable works: Author of Palamou & Bengal Ryots: Their Rights and Liabilities
- Movement: Bengal Renaissance

Sanjib Chandra Chattopadhyay (Bengali: সঞ্জীবচন্দ্র চট্টোপাধ্যায়, romanized: Shonjeeb Chôndro Chôţţopaddhae; 1834 – 18 April 1889) was a Bengali writer, poet and journalist. He was the elder brother of Bankim Chandra Chattopadhyay.

Sanjib Chandra was born to an orthodox Brahmin family at Kanthalpara, North 24 Parganas. He was educated at Hooghly Mohsin College, founded by Bengali philanthropist Muhammad Mohsin and Presidency College, Calcutta. He was one of the first graduates of the University of Calcutta.

Sanjib Chandra is widely regarded as a key figure in literary renaissance of Bengal as well as India. Some of his writings, including novels, essays and commentaries, were a breakaway from traditional verse-oriented Indian writings, and provided an inspiration for authors across India.

== Early life and background ==
Sanjib Chandra was born in the village Kanthalpara in the town of North 24 Parganas, Near Naihati, in an orthodox Bengali Brahmin family, the youngest of three brothers, to Yadav (or Jadab) Chandra Chattopadhyaya and Durgadebi. His family was orthodox, and his father, a government official who went on to become the Deputy Collector of Midnapur. He is known for his famous book "Palamau", one of his brothers, Bankim Chandra Chattopadhyay, was also a novelist.

He was educated at the Hooghly Mohsin College founded by philanthropist Muhammad Mohsin and later at the Presidency College, graduating with a degree in Arts [Law] in 1857. He was among the early graduates of the University of Calcutta. He later obtained a degree in Law as well, in 1869.

== Literary career ==
Bangadarshan was published by his editorial ship.

Palamou - A travel literature, considered as a classic.

Bengal Ryots : Their Rights and Liabilities
