= Prabhanshu Sekhar Pal =

Bengali revolutionary (1913-2007)

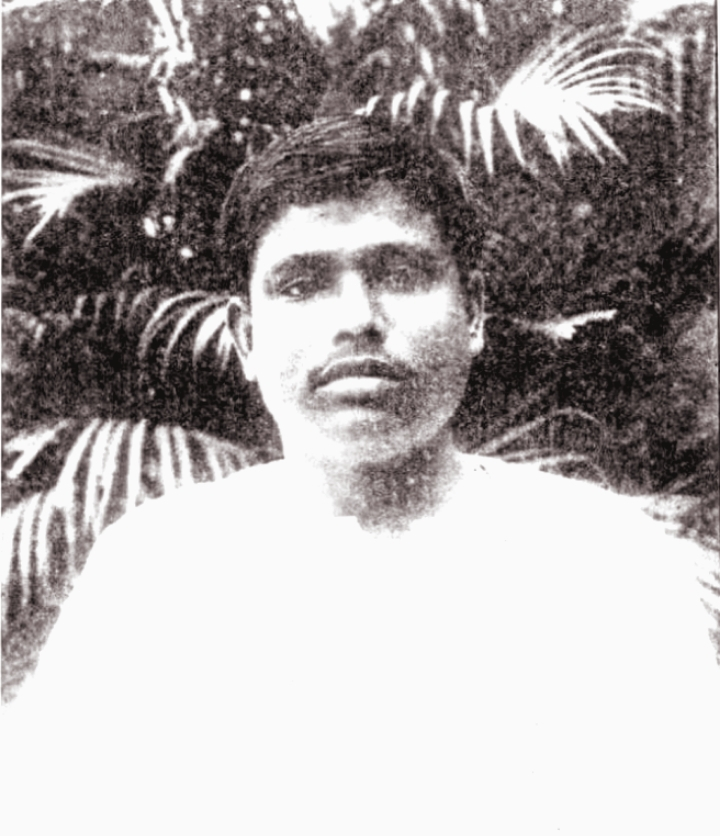
- Prabhangsu Pal
- Born: 15 July 1913; Daspur, Ghatal, British India
- Died: 2 June 2007 (aged 93)
- Movement: Indian Freedom Movement

Prabhanshu Sekhar Pal (15 July 1913 – 2 June 2007) nicknamed Jambu, was an Indian revolutionary and member of the Bengal Volunteers who carried out assassinations against British colonial officials in an attempt to secure Indian independence.

== Early life ==
Prabhanshu Sekhar Pal was born into a Mahishya family in1913. His father's name was Dr. Ashutosh Pal and mother's name was Lakhmimani Pal. His father was a doctor and a research scholar. His original ancestral home was in Khanjapur village of Daspur, Ghatal. When he was a child he was sent to his maternal uncle's house at Midnapore where he joined the Bengal Volunteers, a revolutionary organisation of British India. He was a close associate of Netaji Subhash Chandra Bose.

== Revolutionary activities ==
After the murder of District Magistrate James Peddie, Robert Douglas, a ruthless District Magistrate, was posted to Midnapore district.The revolutionaries of the Bengal Volunteers (BV) decided to assassinate Douglas because he was responsible for killing two unarmed activists in Hijli Detention Camp. On 30 April 1932, Pal and Pradyot Kumar Bhattacharya fired on the magistrate while he was presiding over a meeting of the Zilla District Board, now Zilla Parishad Bhavan. Pal escaped but Bhattacharya was caught on the spot with the revolver. Bhattacharya did not give away any names of accomplices in spite of severe torture by the police. After the murders of Magistrates Peddie and Douglas no British officer was ready to take the charge of Midnapore District until Bernard E. J. Burge, another ruthless District Magistrate, was posted to Midnapore. Members of the Bengal Volunteers decided to assassinate him also. Pal helped the members of BV to collect the weapons for the assassination of Burge. On 2 September 1933 Burge was shot and killed during the half time of a football match on the police parade ground by Nirmal Jibon Ghosh, Anath Bondhu Panja and Mrigendra Dutta.

== Later life ==
After Pal was released from prison he obtained a Bachelor of Commerce degree in 1941. For the rest of his life he worked as a homeopathic doctor. He was honoured with a Tamrapatra by the Indian Government in August 1972. Pal died on 2 June 2007.
