= Ramkrishna Roy =

Indian revolutionary (1912-1934)

Ram Krishna Roy
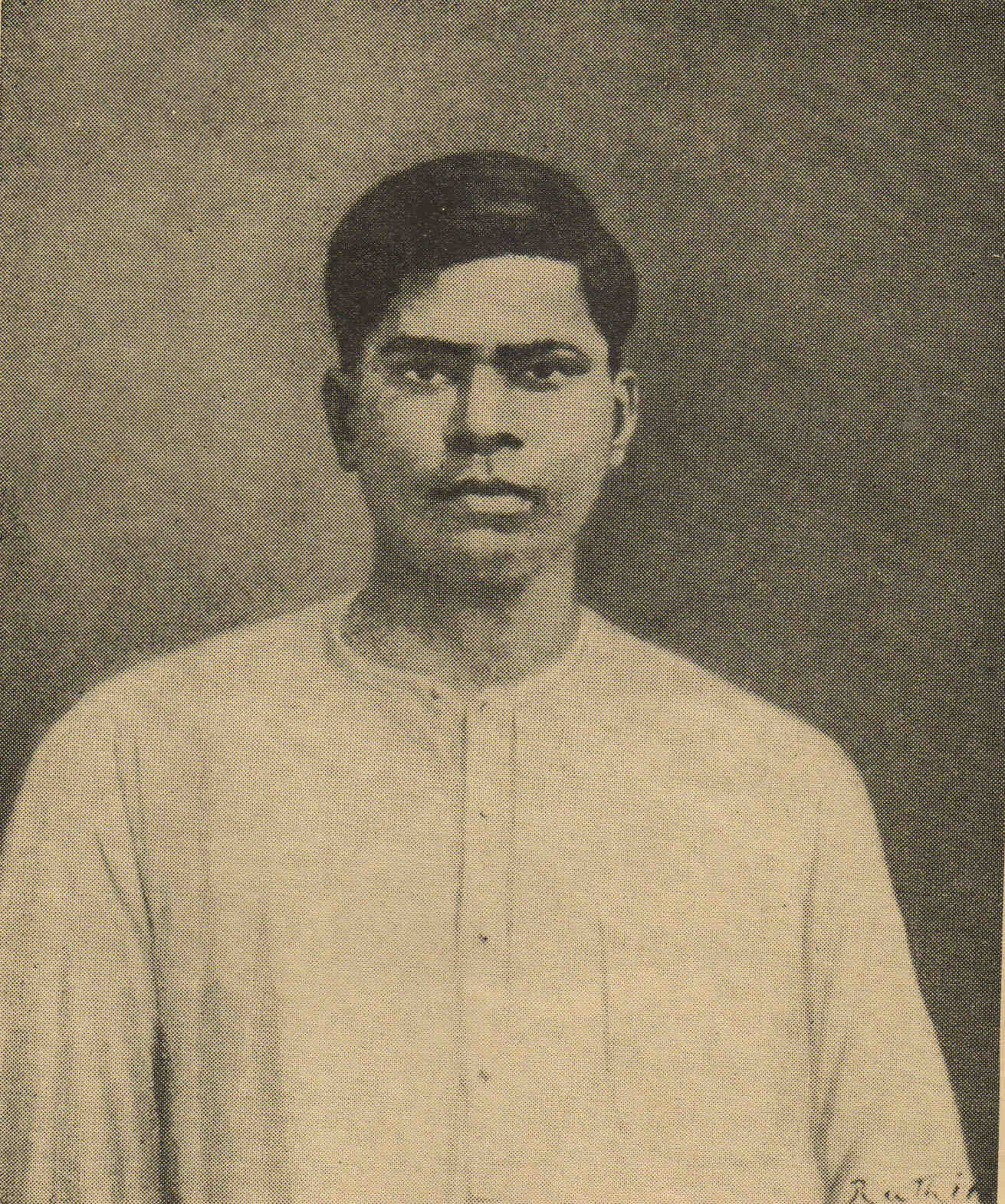
- Born: 9 January 1912; Chirimarsai near Dwariband, Midnapore, British India
- Died: 15 October 1934 (aged 22); Medinipore Central Jail, Midnapore, British India
- Occupation: Revolutionary
- Organization: Bengal Volunteers
- Movement: Indian independence movement

Ram Krishna Roy (9 January 1912 – 15 October 1934) was an Indian revolutionary and member of the Bengal Volunteers who carried out assassinations against British colonial officials in an attempt to secure Indian independence. He was hanged on 15 October 1934 for the charge of assassination of Magistrate Burge.

== Early life and family ==
Ram Krishna Roy was born in a Mahishya family in Chirimarsai near Dwariband (Paschim Medinipur) in 1911. His father's name was Kenaram Roy. His mother's name was Bhabatarini Devi. He got admitted in Midnapore Town School in 1922 as a class III student. He joined Bengal Volunteers, a revolutionary organisation of British India. He also worked with Deshapran Birendranath Sasmal in 1926 General election. From 1928 he worked with Netaji Subhas Chandra Bose.

== Revolutionary activities ==
After the murder of Magistrate Paddy and Robert Douglas no British officer was ready to take the charge of Midnapore District. Bernard E J Burge, a District Magistrate was posted in Midnapore district. The members of the Bengal volunteers i.e. Ramkrishna Roy, Brajakishore Chakraborty, Prabhanshu Sekhar Pal, Kamakhya Charan Ghosh, Sonatan Roy, Nanda Dulal Singh, Sukumar Sen Gupta, Bijoy Krishna Ghose, Purnananda Sanyal, Manindra Nath Choudhury, Saroj Ranjan Das Kanungo, Santi Gopal Sen, Sailesh Chandra Ghose, Anath Bondhu Panja and Mrigendra Dutta etc. decided to assassinate him. He along with Anath Bondhu Panja, Brajakishore Chakraborty, Nirmal Jiban Ghosh and Mrigen Dutta planned to shot him dead while Burge was playing a football match ( Bradley-Birt football tournament) named by Francis Bradley Bradley-Birt at the police grounds of Midnapore. Burge, during the half time of the football match in Police parade ground was killed on 2 September 1933 by them. Anathbandhu was killed instantly by the body guard of the DM and Mrigen Dutta died in the hospital on the next day. Anathbandhu Panja and Mrigen Dutta was acquitted on murder charge of the district magistrate of Midnapore.

== Death ==
He was hanged on 15 October 1934 for the charge of assassination of Magistrate Burge.
