= Midnapore Town School =

Location
- Midnapore, West Bengal, 721101; India
- Coordinates: 22.4110062°N 87.3275358°E

Information
- Established: 1883
- School district: Paschim Medinipur

Midnapore Town School, established in 1883, is one of the oldest school located in Midnapore town, West Bengal, India.

The school follows the course curricula of West Bengal Board of Secondary Education (WBBSE) and West Bengal Council of Higher Secondary Education (WBCHSE) for Standard 10th and 12th Board examinations respectively.

== Notable alumni ==
- Hemchandra Kanungo
- Anath Bondhu Panja
- Ramkrishna Roy

== See also ==
- Education in India
- List of schools in India
- Education in West Bengal
