= Francis Bradley Bradley-Birt =

British diplomat and writer

- Born: 25 June 1874
- Died: 11 June 1963 (aged 88); Malvern, Worcestershire, England
- Education: University of Oxford
- Occupations: Civil servant, writer
- Spouse: Lady Norah Spencer-Churchill
- Writing career
- Pen name: Shelland Bradley

Francis Bradley Bradley-Birt ICS FRGS (25 June 1874 – 11 June 1963) was a British diplomat and writer.

== Biography ==
He began his career as an English member of the Indian Civil Service. His duty in India began in 1896, and he started as an assistant magistrate and collector. He was originally assigned to Khulna, Midnapore, Hooghly and Calcutta. At some point he was re-assigned to the commander-in-chief in India, and later served in the British legation in Tehran. Bradley-Birt wrote both fiction and non-fiction about his travels in India, Persia and the Middle East. In India he was attached to the Archaeological service, and this formed the basis for some of his non-fiction work. He wrote under his own name and under the pseudonym "Shelland Bradley."

Ramananda Chatterjee credited Bradley-Birt with "resuscitating" the literary study of Henry Louis Vivian Derozio.

Bradley-Birt married (1 December 1920) Lady Norah Beatrice Henriette Spencer-Churchill Of Marlborough, daughter of George Spencer-Churchill, 8th Duke of Marlborough (she was, therefore, a cousin of Winston Churchill).

Bradley-Birt owned a property known as Birtsmorton Court, which he acquired from his uncle, F. R. Bradley-Birt, who bought it in 1911, re-uniting it with the neighboring property of Berrow, which was already under his ownership.

== Works ==
- Through Persia, from the gulf to the Caspian (1909)
- Persia; through Persia from the Gulf to the Caspian (1910)
- Bengal fairy tales (1920) (with illustrations by Abanindranath Tagore)
- Chota Nagpore, a little-known province of the empire (1903)
- The story of an Indian upland (1905)
- The romance of an eastern capital (1906)
- Twelve men of Bengal in the nineteenth century (1910)
- 'Sylhet' Thackeray (1911)
- Poems of Henry Louis Vivian Derozio : a forgotten Anglo-Indian (1923)

=== Written under pseudonym ===
- The Doings of Berengaria (1902)
- An American Girl in India (1907)
- The Adventures of an A.D.C. (1910)
- An American Girl at the Durbar (1912)
- Fifty (1927)
