= Midnapore district =

Former district in West Bengal, India

- Former district of British and independent India
- 1760–2002
- Location and area of Midnapore district in West Bengal (2001)
- Capital: Midnapore
- Area
  - Coordinates: 22.424°N 87.319°E
  - 1760: 15,804 km^{2} (6,102 sq mi)
  - 1822: 21,394 km^{2} (8,260 sq mi)
  - 1872: 13,163 km^{2} (5,082 sq mi)
  - 2001: 14,081 km^{2} (5,437 sq mi)
- Population
  - 1822: 1,914,060
  - 1872: 2,540,963
  - 2001: 9,610,788
- History
  - Ceded to East India Company: 1760
  - Dhalbhum, Khatra, Raipur and Simlapal area curved out: 1833
  - Bifurcation: 2002
Succeeded by
East Medinipur district
West Medinipur district
Jhargram district

Midnapore, also known as Medinipur (Mēdinīpura, Bengali pronunciation: [med̪inipuɾ]), is a former district in the Indian state of West Bengal, headquartered in Midnapore. On 1 January 2002, the district was bifurcated into two separate districts namely Purba Medinipur and Paschim Medinipur. It was the largest district of West Bengal by area and population at the time of bifurcation.

== Etymology ==
There are conflicting accounts of how the name Medinipur came to be. One account claims that Medinipur was named after a local deity "Medinimata" (literally "mother of the world", a Shakti incarnation). According to Sri Hari Sadhan Das, the district got its name from "Medinikar", the founder of the city in 1238, who was the son of "Prankara", the feudal king of "Gondichadesh". He was also the writer of "Medinikosh". Hara Prasad Shastri thinks that the city Medinikar established it around the time he wrote the book (1200-1431). He is said to have built the fort called "Kornelgola" situated in the city.

== History ==
=== Mediaeval to colonial history ===
In ancient times the region seems to be highly influenced by Jainism and Buddhism. The kingdom of Shashanka and Harshavardhana also included part of undivided Midnapore in their kingdom. However, the most significant archaeological site in the region is the bustling port of Tamralipta near present-day Tamluk, a site noted in the travelogues of Faxian and Xuanzang. Later Chaitanya passed through the area on his way from Puri to Varanasi as documented in the Chaitanya Charitamrita. After the fall of last independent Hindu dynasty of Kalinga-Utkala, Gajapati Mukunda Deva in the 16th century, this region came under one of the five Sarkars of Mughalbandi Odisha i.e. Jaleswar Sarkar which was ruled by the Subehdar of Odisha. The north boundary of Jaleswar was Tamluk and south was Soro and Dhalbhumgarh in the west to the Bay of Bengal in the east. Bahadur Khan was the ruler of Jaleswar Sarkar or Hijli (including Midnapore) during the time of Shah Jehan. He was defeated by Shah Shuja, the second son of Shah Jehan, then the subahdar of Bengal.

During the era of the Muslim rulers of Bengal nawab, Alivardi Khan's general Mir Jafar fought successfully against Mir Habib's lieutenant Sayyid Nur near Midnapore in 1746. This was part of his campaign to regain Odisha and thwart the Maratha attacks on Bengal. Mir Habib came up from Balasore and was joined by the Marathas, but Mir Jafar fled to Burdwan, leaving Mir Habib to retake Midnapore with ease. Alivardi Khan defeated Janoji Bhosle, a Maratha chieftain, in a severely contested battle near Burdwan in 1747 and Janoji fled to Midnapore. The Marathas held on to Odisha including Midnapore until 1749 when it was reconquered by Alivardi Khan. The Marathas continued to raid Midnapore, which proved disastrous for the residents.

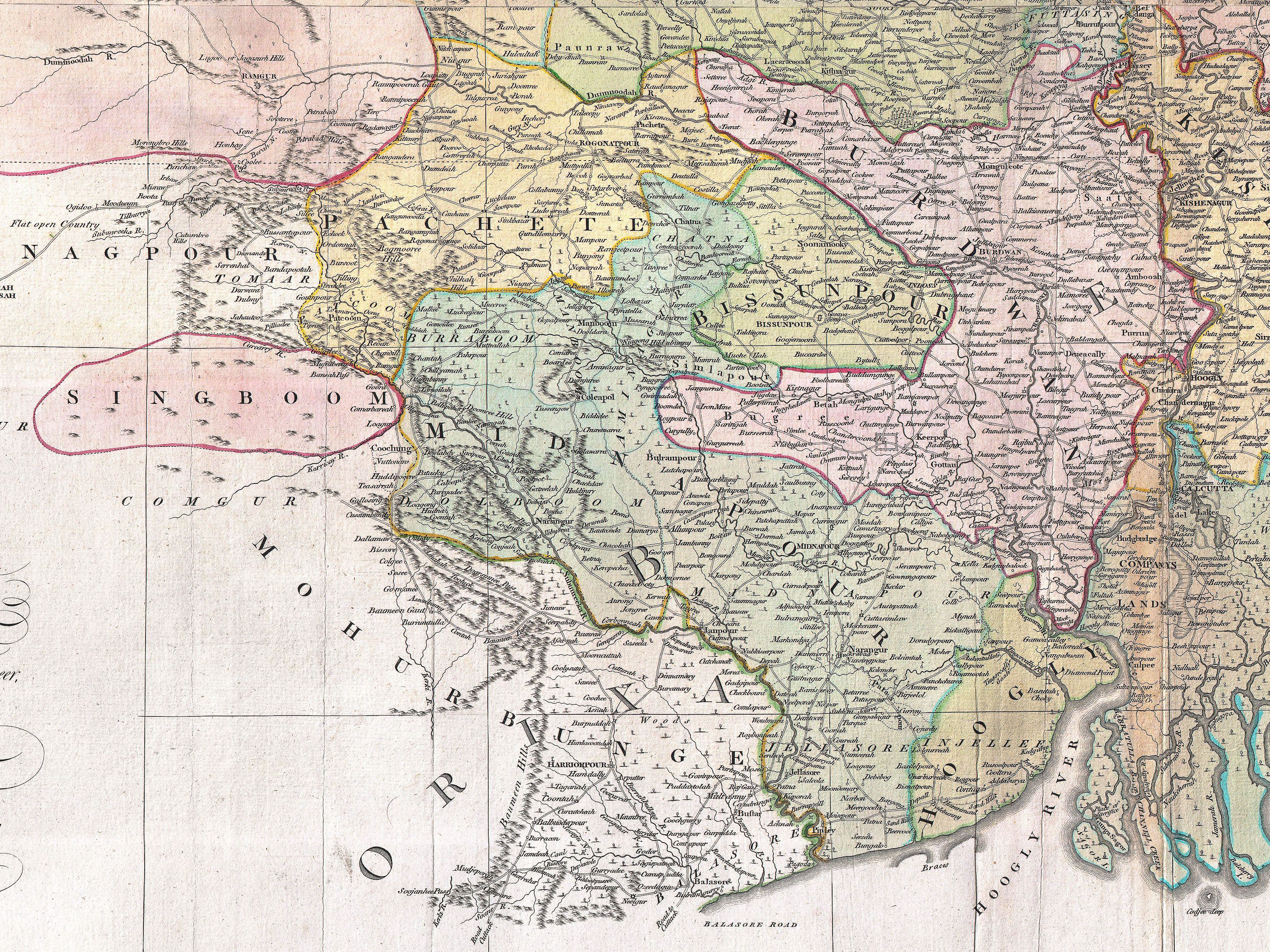
James Rennell's 1776 map showing the Midnapore district area, as ceded to the East India Company in 1760

In 1756, Alivardi Khan died and his successor was Siraj-ud-daulah. On 20 June 1757, he was betrayed by Mir Jafar to the East India Company under the command of Lord Robert Clive at Plassey. This consolidated the company's hold on Bengal and Odisha (along with Midnapore). The district of Midnapore which included Dhalbhum or Ghatshila, now in Singhbhum, Jharkhand was annexed in 1760 along with Burdwan and Chittagong both handed over to the East India Company by Mir Qasim. The last free king of Dhalbhum was imprisoned in Midnapore.

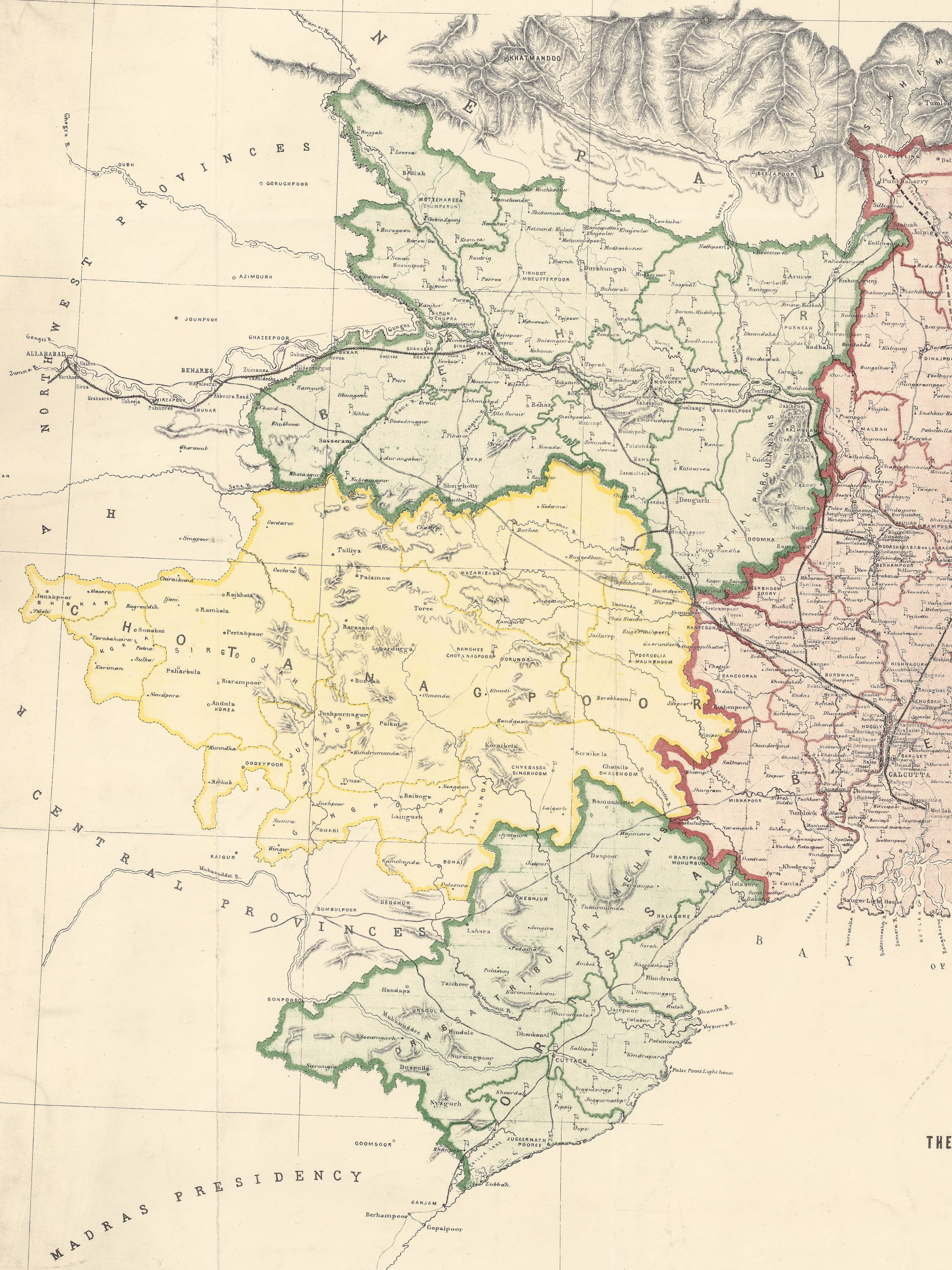
The 1872 census district map of the Bengal Presidency depicts Midnapore District as part of the Burdwan Division, and its territorial jurisdiction remained unchanged until bifurcation in 2002.

Some of the Malla kings of Mallabhum in the Bankura district held land in northern Midnapore district, while the Raj rules of Narajole, Jhargram, Lalgarh, Jamboni, and Chandrakona held sway in their local areas. The Raj rulers in Rajasthan would pay homage to Jagannath but carves out their own territories under the supremacy of the Hindu empires of Odisha. The Mallick Zamindars also ruled over an extensively large area during the British rule. They also built the Jagannath Temple of Midnapore.

=== Partition of the district ===
The earliest recorded attempt to divide Midnapore district was announced during the time of the British Raj in 1915. Since, the district was administered by a district magistrate or 'collector'. The idea behind the division was to make the administration of the large district more manageable. The Government of the province of Bengal had floated the idea in 1907, but had not implemented it, due to the volatile situation in the province following the Partition of Bengal. A new district of Hijli was to be set up to help in administration. Midnapore was also a hotbed of revolutionary activity, and it was thought that dividing the district would allow the British rulers to tighten their grip. The announcement of the partition on 26 January 1915 was greeted with protests from zamindars who feared they would be taxed twice if their lands spanned two districts, and by the lawyers of the district court who felt their business would be hurt if another district court was set up at Hijli. Upendra Nath Maity, President of the Midnapore Bar Association commented that the division of the district would be financially unsound since there were, in his opinion, more pressing matters that the administration needed to finance. Birendranath Sasmal, a prominent barrister and politician, initially supported the partition when it was possible that his hometown, Contai, might be the seat of the new district, but opposed it, when Hijli was announced instead. A number of members of the Indian National Congress also opposed the partition citing that they believed the ruling class wanted to break the unity of the politically conscious population of the undivided district. Agitation against the partition continued until 1921, when the whole idea was canned, due to financial reasons.

In independent India, successive governments had expressed a desire to divide the district but this was never done until the government led by Chief Minister Buddhadeb Bhattacharjee finalized the details of the partition and set a date. The mood in various towns in that were affected was variable, as gauged by local newspapers. In general, the event was treated with concern and dismay in Midnapore by inhabitants citing a loss of importance, greeted with parades and other festivities in Tamluk since it was now a district town, and with dismay or apathy in Contai since Contai had failed to become the district town in the newly formed district. The major opposition party, the Trinamool Congress opposed the move, but a section of the media was favorable. Dividing the district, it was felt would help the administration reach the people and assist in providing better healthcare and educational facilities. Opponents mentioned that many of the problems of Naxalite elements would be plaguing the district of Paschim Medinpur and would take up too much of its now limited resources. New administrative and legislative buildings began to come up immediately in Tamluk after the partition came into effect. A new district magistrate and superintendent of police was also appointed.

Midnapore district was bifurcated into two districts, Purba Medinipur and Paschim Medinipur, on 1 January 2002. The Medinipur Sadar, Kharagpur, Jhargram, and Ghatal subdivision were placed in Paschim Medinipur, with Midnapore as headquarters. While Tamluk, Contai, and Haldia subdivision were placed in the Purba Medinipur district with district headquarters at Tamluk. Egra subdivision, a new subdivision of Purba Medinipur, was created out of the Contai subdivision. Further, on April 4, 2017, the Jhargram subdivision of Paschim Medinipur was carved out as a separate district.

== Demographics ==
Historical population
Year	Pop.	±%
1872	2,542,920	—
1881	2,515,567	−1.1%
1891	2,631,466	+4.6%
1901	2,789,114	+6.0%
1911	2,821,201	+1.2%
1921	2,666,660	−5.5%
1931	2,799,093	+5.0%
1941	3,190,647	+14.0%
1951	3,359,022	+5.3%
1961	4,341,855	+29.3%
1971	5,509,247	+26.9%
1981	6,742,796	+22.4%
1991	8,331,912	+23.6%
2001	9,610,788	+15.3%
Note: After 2001, the Midnapore district was bifurcated into two separate districts namely Purba Medinipur and Paschim Medinipur. Subsequently, in 2017, Jhargram subdivision of Paschim Medinipur district curved out as a separate district. Source: Census of India

=== Religion ===
Religions in Midnapore district (2001)
Religion	Percent
Hinduism	85.58%
Islam	11.33%
ORP	2.73%
Christianity	0.23%
Buddhism, Sikhism and Jainism	0.07%
Not stated	0.07%
*ORP mostly adherents of Sari and Sarna Dharma

According to the 2001 Census 85.58% (8,224,779) people are Hindus, 11.33% (1,088,618) are Muslims, 0.23% (21,863) are Christians, 0.03% (3,237) are Sikhs, 0.02% (1,637) are Buddhist, 0.02% (1,635) Jains, and 0.07% (6,441) didn't stated any religious affiliation, while the rest 2.73% (262,578) are adherent of tribal faiths (primarily Sari and Sarna Dharma) and other unclassified sect and beliefs.

=== Languages ===
Languages of the district (2001)
1. Bengali (90.5%)
2. Santali (5.00%)
3. Hindi (1.38%)
4. Kurmali (0.70%)
5. Urdu (0.62%)
6. Telugu (0.58%)
7. Odia (0.37%)
8. Mundari (0.21%)
9. Kora (0.11%)
10. Other (0.56%)

At the time of 2001, the last census of the district, Bengali speakers accounted for 90.47% (8.7 million), Santali 5% (480,000), and Hindi 1.38% (130,000). Kurmali (0.7%), Urdu (0.62%), Telugu (0.58%), and Odia (0.37%) had 68,000, 60,000, 56,000, and 36,000 speakers, respectively. Mundari (0.21%) and Koda (0.11%) had 20,000 and 11,000 speakers.

=== Social groups ===
As of the last census of the district, i.e. the 2001 Census, Scheduled Communities accounted for half of the total population, with Scheduled Castes comprising 33.6% (1,576,337) and Scheduled Tribes 17% (798,684). However, according to the 1931 census, out of a total population of 2,789,093 in Midnapore district, the Mahishya (incl. Chasa-Kaibrata, Mahisya-Kshatriya) community accounted for 31.67%, followed by Santal (6.09%), Bagdi (5.51%), Brahman (4.29%), Sadgop (3.93%), Kurmi (3.07%), Tanti and Tatwa (3.04%), Baisnaba (2.21%), Kayastha (1.98%), Raju (1.96%), Bhumij (1.62%), Adi-Kaibrata (1.61%), Goala (1.5%), Namsudra (1.33%), Pod (1.32%), Napit (1.29%), Dhobi (1.18%), Kamar (1.17%), and Kalu and Teli (1.11%). Communities accounting for between 1% and 0.1% of the population included Kumhar, Hari, Tili, Dom, Bhuiya, Bauri, Rajput, Kora, Lodha, Rajbansi, Muchi, Mal, Kaora, Barui, Suri, Jogi, Rajwar, Tiyar, Karenga, Kandra, Mahli, Mali, and Munda. The Muslim community made up 7.62% of the population, including Mumin (Jholaha) at 0.25% and Sayyad at 0.27%, while the remaining 7.6% of the population consisted of various smaller minority communities each below 0.1%.
