= Bengal Volunteers =

Underground revolutionary group

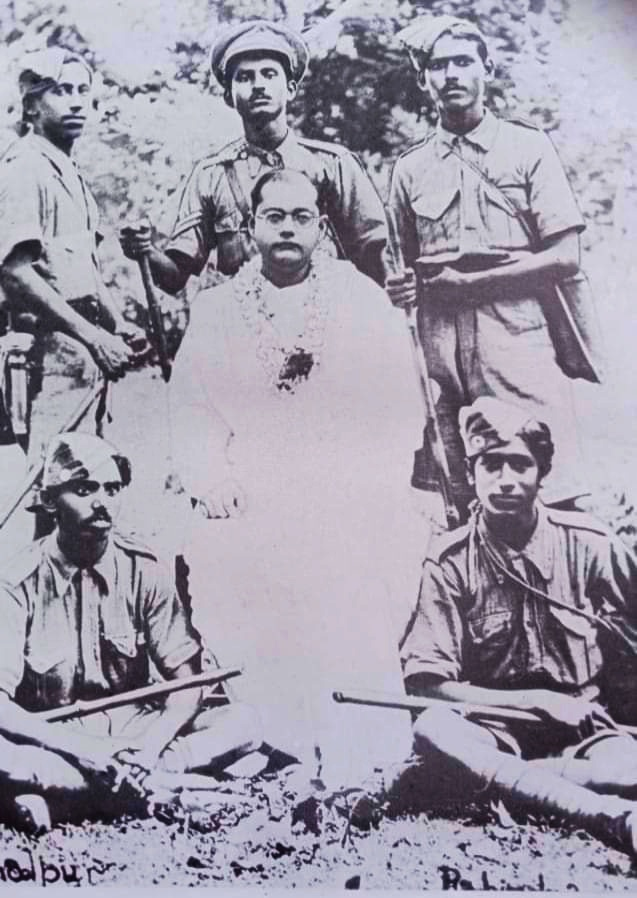
Subhash Chandra Bose along with members of Bengal Volunteers

Bengal Volunteers Corps was an underground revolutionary group against the British rule of India. The group was functional from its inception in 1928 to Indian independence.

== The beginning ==
Subhas Chandra Bose organised a group of volunteers during the 1928 Kolkata session of the Indian National Congress. The group was named Bengal Volunteers Corps and was under the leadership of Major Satya Gupta. Subhas Chandra Bose himself was the general officer commanding. After the Calcutta session of the Congress was over, the Bengal Volunteers continued its activities, under the guidance of Gupta, and was turned into an active revolutionary association.

== Activities ==
The Bengal Volunteers decided to launch 'Operation Freedom' in the early 1930s, primarily to protest against the police repression in different jails in Bengal.
