= Pradyot Kumar Bhattacharya =

Bengali revolutionary (1913–1933)

Pradyut Kumar Bhattacharya
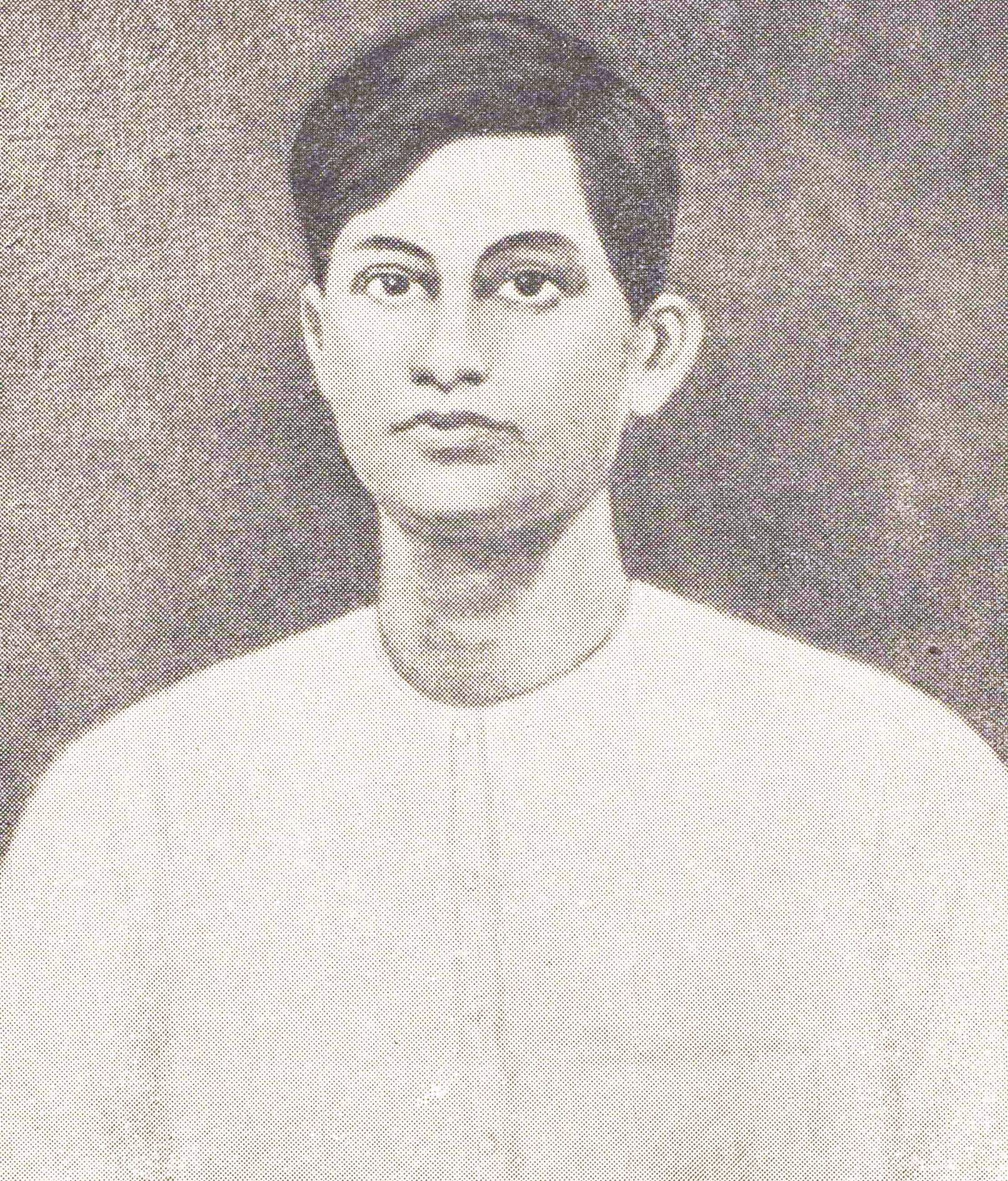
- Pradyot Bhattacharya
- Born: 3 November 1913; Gokulnagar, Midnapore, British India ( present day Paschim Medinipur, West Bengal, India)
- Died: 12 January 1933 (aged 19); Midnapore central Jail, Midnapore, Bengal Presidency, British India
- Cause of death: Execution by hanging
- Movement: Indian freedom movement

Pradyut Kumar Bhattacharya (3 November 1913 – 12 January 1933) was a Bengali revolutionary and activist of the Indian freedom movement. He was hanged in Midnapore Central jail.

== Revolutionary activities ==
Pradayot Kumar Bhattacharya was born in Midnapore, British India. His father's name was Bhabataran Bhattacharya. He joined in the anti-British movement and Jugantar group while studying in Midnapore College. The revolutionaries of the Bengal Volunteers decided to assassinate ruthless Second magistrate Robert Doglas because he was responsible for killing two unarmed activists in Hijli Detention Camp. On 30 April 1932, Prabhanshu Sekhar Pal and Bhattacharya fired on the magistrate while he was presiding over a meeting of the Zilla District Board. Pal escaped but Bhattacharya was caught on the spot with the revolver. Pradyot did not utter any name in spite of severe torture by the police. In the subsequent trial, he and the other revolutionaries were defended by Birendranath Sasmal. However, as one of Bhattacharya's brothers had turned out to be a witness for the prosecution, he could not be saved.

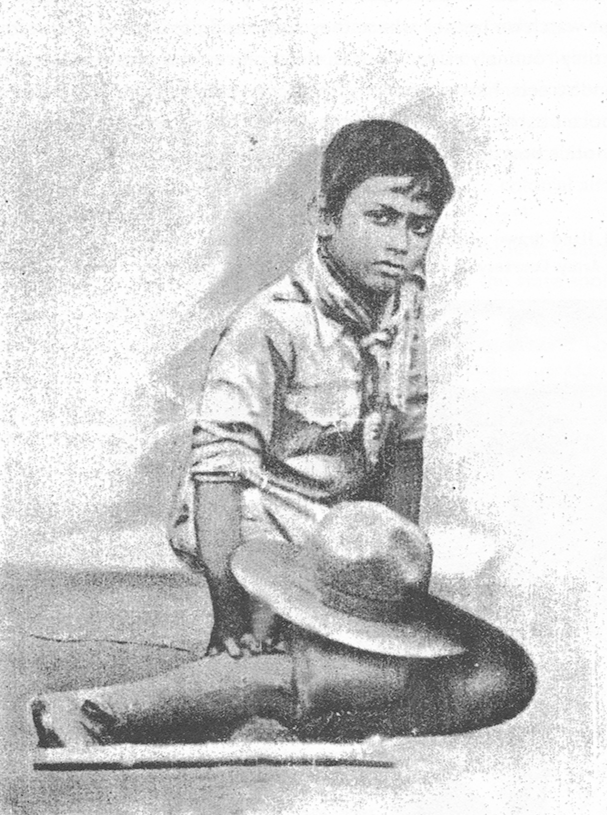
Pradyot Bhattacharya, as a volunteer.

== Death ==
On 12 January 1933 Bhattacharya was executed by hanging in Medinipur Central Jail but Prabhanshu remained untraced.
