= Khanto Bala Rai =

Indian educator

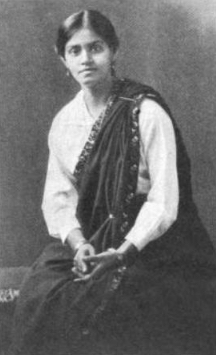
- Khanto Bala Rai, from a 1921 publication.
- Born: 1897 (age 128–129); Midnapore, British India (Present day in Paschim Medinipur district, West Bengal, India
- Other names: Khanta Bela Rai
- Occupation: teacher
- Known for: Principal, Mission Girls' High School, Midnapore

Khanto Bala Rai (born 1897) was a Bengali Christian educator, head of the Mission Girls' High School in Midnapore beginning in 1923.

== Early life ==
Khanto Bala Rai was the daughter of evangelist Sachidananda Rai and teacher Esther Rai, Christian converts in Bengal. She attended Bethune College in Calcutta, and the University of Nebraska.

== Career ==
Rai taught at a Baptist girls' school in Midnapore. Her older sister, Shanta Bala Rai, was also a teacher at Midnapore.

Rai traveled with medical missionary Mary W. Bacheler to the United States in 1921. That year, she made appearances and speeches at American Baptist gatherings, with Burmese doctor Ma Saw Sa and Chinese teacher Kan En Vong, among others, as a group representing the work of Baptist women missionaries in Asian countries. She collected English-language books while in the United States, to create a library at the school in Midnapore when she returned. "We would like all kinds of children's story books, magazines, and some religious story books," she explained to a Baptist publication in 1922.

She returned to Midnapore after her time in the United States, and returned to schoolwork there, as headmistress of the Midnapore Mission Girls' School starting in 1923. "In executive ability, tact with teachers, pupils, and patrons, and keen insight into the needs and opportunities of the school Miss Rai has shown her real worth and has greatly strengthened the school," noted a 1924 report. She described the challenges of a growing school in a 1925 letter to American Baptists. She was still principal of the school in a 1926 update.
