= Syed Shah Murshed Ali Alquadri Al Jilani =

Pioneer of Quaderia order in Bengal

Syed Shah Murshed Ali Al-Quadri Al-Jilani, commonly known as Maula Pak and Huzur Purnoor, was an Indian Sufi saint of the Quaderia order in Bengal. He was the 19th direct descendant of Abdul Qadir Jilani.

== Early life and education ==
Syed Shah Murshed Ali Al-Quadri Al-Jilani was born on Shab-e-Qadr night Friday, the 27th of Ramadan, 1268 A.H /16 July 1852 AD ancestral house in the town of Midnapore. He was the eldest son and Sajjada nashin Syed Shah Mehr Ali Alquadri Al Baghdadi. His mother was Syeda Umm-ul Barkat Khatun Fatima Saniya. She was from the descendant of Syed Isa Rizvi, who came from Bukhara and settled at Payardanga in the district of Midnapore.

He got by heart his lessons by reading them only once and retained them throughout his life. At a very early age he mastered the commentaries of the Quran, Hadith, principles of Fiqah and Islamic Jurisprudence, Logic, and other subjects. He was the master of all branches of Knowledge. He had a great love for Hadith too. In his presence the difficult books of Hadith would often be recited. He had a large collection of books relating to the subject of Hadith.

== Students ==
- Khondokar Yusuf Ali
- Shamsul Ulema Velayat Hussain
- Habibul Hassan
- Syed Shah Abdul Malik
- Khan Bahadur Abdul Ghaffar

== Personal life ==
He married twice, firstly with Syeda Salehatunnesa better known as Subah Bibi was from the family of a saint Ruhullah Al Hussaini who was the descendant of Imam Hussain and second time with Syeda Najmunnisa Khatun was the daughter of Hafiz Syed Fateh Ali of Arrah, Bihar. They had four sons and two daughters. His first wife bore him three sons, Syed Shah Arshad Ali Al-Quadri, Syed Shah Irshad Ali Al-Quadri, Syed Shah Rashed Ali Al-Quadri, and a daughter Syeda Amatul Fatima. His second wife bore him one daughter Syeda Saghira Khatun and a son Syed Shah Khurshid Ali Al-Quadri.

== Death and legacy ==
He died on 27th of Shawal, 1318 A.H, corresponding to 17 February 1901 AD. The Namaz-e-Janazah was led by Maulana Khairuddin, father of Maulana Abul Kalam Azad.

He was buried in the family burial ground at Mia Mohallah in Midnapore Town. A special train also runs from Bangladesh to Midnapore on this occasion.

== Works ==
- Diwan-e-Hazrat-e-Jamal
- Toghra-e-Mahamed
