= Midnapore =

Midnapore Medinipur
- City
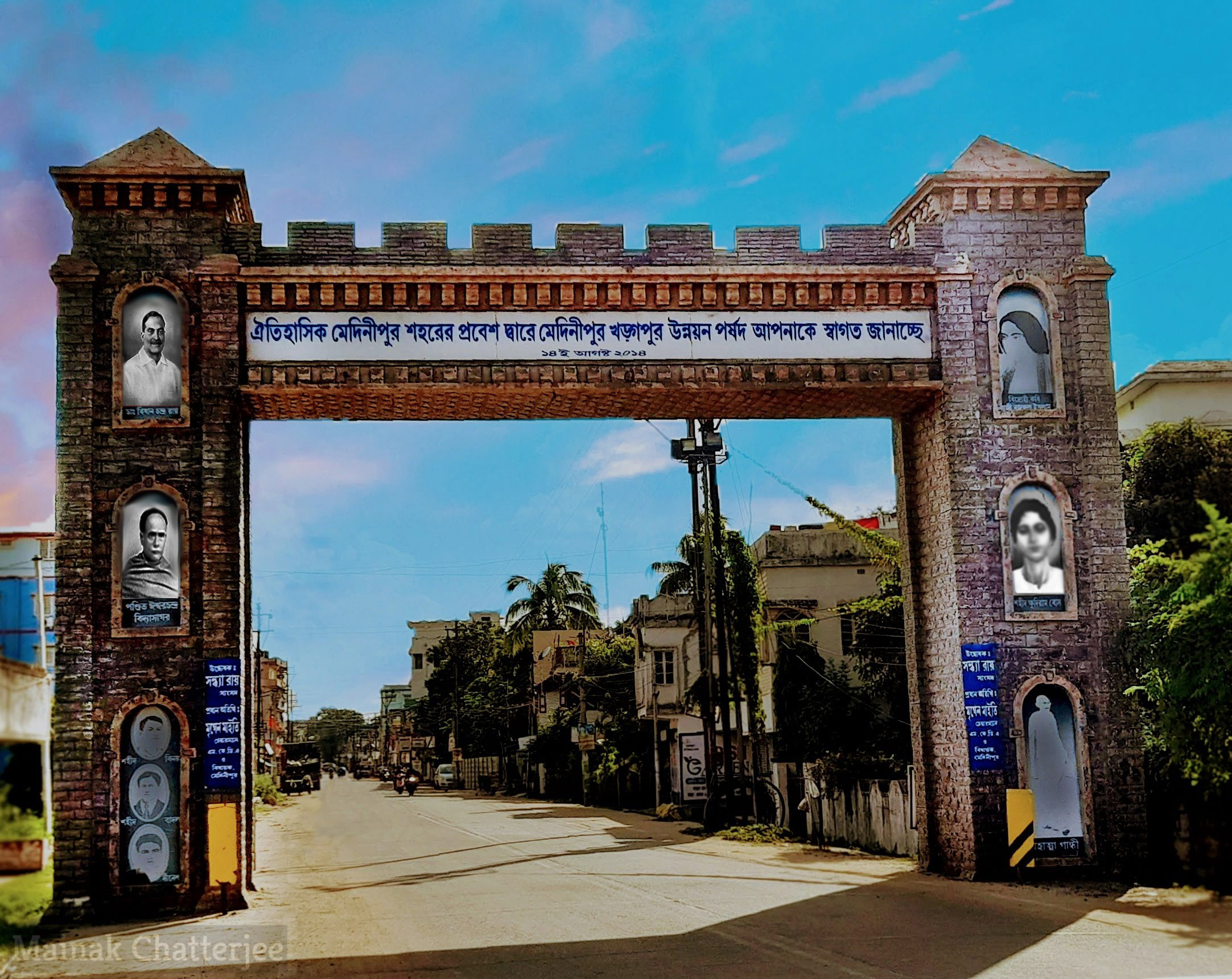
- Midnapore Gate

- Location in West Bengal, India Midnapore (India)
- Coordinates: 22.424°N 87.319°E
- Country: India
- State: West Bengal
- District: Paschim Medinipur

Government
  - Type: Municipality
  - Body: Midnapore Municipality
  - MLA: Dr Sankar Kumar Guchhait (BJP)
  - Chairman: Soumen Khann
  - MP: June Malia (TMC)

Area
  - City: 18.65 km^{2} (7.20 sq mi)
  - Urban: 57 km^{2} (22 sq mi)

Population (2011)
  - City: 169,127
  - Rank: 270th in India
  - Density: 9,068/km^{2} (23,490/sq mi)
- Demonym: Midnaporean

Languages*
  - Official: Bengali, English
- Time zone: UTC+5:30 (IST)
- PIN: 721 101 and 721 102
- Telephone code: 91-3222
- Vehicle registration: WB 33 - WB 36
- Lok Sabha constituency: Medinipur Assembly constituency
- Vidhan Sabha constituency: Medinipur
- Sex ratio: 992 females/1000 males ♂/♀
- Website: midnaporemunicipality.com

Midnapore (Bengali pronunciation: [med̪inipuɾ]), is a city known for its history in the Indian state of West Bengal. It is the headquarters of the Paschim Medinipur district. It is situated on the banks of the Kangsabati River (variously known as Kasai and Cossye). The Urban Agglomeration of Midnapore consists of the city proper, Mohanpur, Keranichati and Khayerullachak. Midnapore and its neighbouring city of Kharagpur constitute the central core of the Midnapore Kharagpur Development Authority metro area, spread across 576 square kilometres.

== Etymology ==
According to Sri Hari Sadhan Das, the city got its name from Medinikar, the founder of the city in 1238, who was the son of Prankara, the feudal king of Gondichadesh.^{[1]} He was also the writer of "Medinikosh". Hara Prasad Shastri thinks that the city Medinikar established it around the time he wrote the book (1200-1431).^{[2]} He is said to have built the fort called Kornelgola situated in the city.^{[3]}

One account claims that Medinipur was named after a local deity “Medinimata” (literally “mother of the world”, a Shakti incarnation) Gram Devata or the guardian deity of Midnapore. Its temple is near Gope, on the outskirts of the town.

== History ==
A number of prehistoric sites of great interest are being excavated throughout the West Midnapore district in collaboration by Calcutta University and Archaeological Survey of India (ASI). In ancient times the region seems to be highly influenced by Jainism and Buddhism. Coins issued by Samudragupta have been found in the near vicinity of the town. The kingdom of Shashanka and Harshavardhana also included part of undivided Midnapore in their kingdom. However, the most significant archaeological site in the region is the bustling port of Tamralipta near present-day Tamluk, a site noted in the travelogues of Faxian and Xuanzang. Later Chaitanya passed through the area on his way from Puri to Varanasi as documented in the Chaitanya Charitamrita. After the fall of last independent Hindu dynasty of Kalinga-Utkala, Gajapati Mukunda Deva in the 16th century, this region came under one of the five Sarkars of Mughalbandi Odisha i.e. Jaleswar Sarkar which was ruled by the Subehdar of Odisha. The north boundary of Jalshwar was Tamluk and south was Soro and Dhalbhumgarh in the west to the Bay of Bengal in the east. Bahadur Khan was the ruler of Jaleshwar Sarkar or Hijli (including Midnapore) during the time of Shah Jehan. He was defeated by Shah Shuja, the second son of Shah Jehan, then the subahdar of Bengal.

During the era of the Muslim rulers of Bengal nawab, Alivardi Khan's general Mir Jafar fought successfully against Mir Habib's lieutenant Sayyid Nur near Midnapore town in the Battle of Midnapur. This was part of his campaign to regain Odisha and thwart the Maratha attacks on Bengal. Mir Habib came up from Balasore and was joined by the Marathas, but Mir Jafar fled to Burdwan, leaving Mir Habib to retake Midnapore with ease. Alivardi defeated Janoji Bhosle, a Maratha chieftain, in a severely contested battle near Burdwan in 1747 and Janoji fled to Midnapore. The Marathas held on to Odisha including Midnapore until 1749 when it was reconquered by Alivardi. The Marathas continued to raid Midnapore, which proved disastrous for the residents.

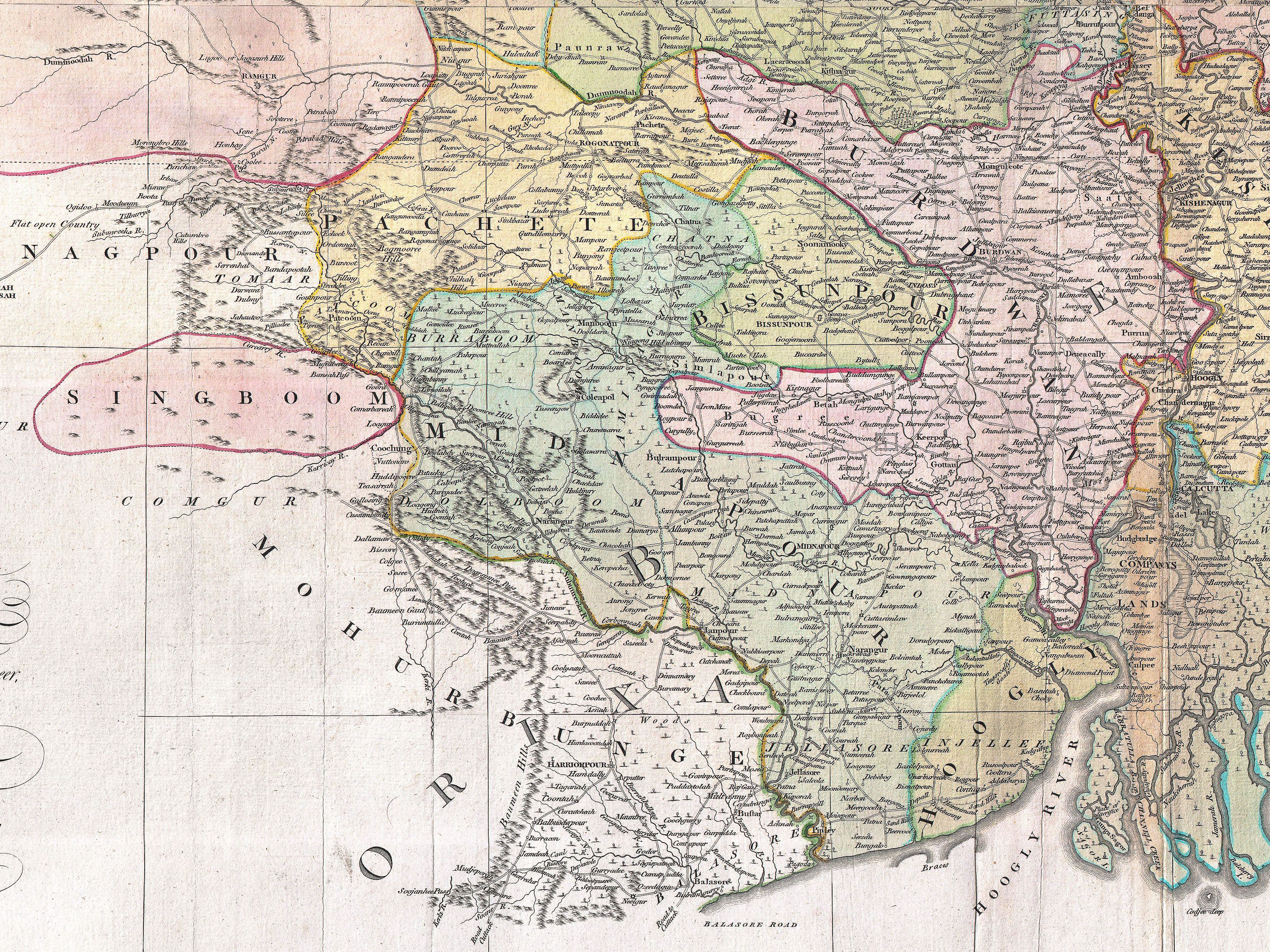
Midnapore on James Rennell's Mid-18th Century Map.

In 1756, Alivardi died and his successor was Siraj-ud-daulah. On 20 June 1757, he was betrayed by Mir Jafar to the East India Company under the command of Lord Robert Clive at Plassey. This consolidated the company's hold on Bengal and Odisha (along with Midnapore). The district of Midnapore which included Dhalbhum or Ghatshila, now in Singhbhum, Jharkhand was annexed in 1760 along with Burdwan and Chittagong both handed over to the East India Company by Mir Qasim. The last free king of Dhalbhum was imprisoned in Midnapore town.

Some of the Malla kings of Mallabhum in the Bankura district held land in northern Midnapore district, while the Raj rules of Narajole, Jhargram, Lalgarh, Jamboni, and Chandrakona held sway in their local areas. The Raj rulers in Rajasthan would pay homage to Jagannath but carves out their own territories under the supremacy of the Hindu empires of Odisha. Notably, the exiled Gajapati ruler of the Puri Estate Mukunda Deva II and his commander-in-chief Jayi Rajaguru were imprisoned in Midnapore between 1806 and 1809. At this time, Rajguru was sentenced to death.

Midnapore is notable for its contribution in the history of Indian freedom movement since it has produced many martyrs. During the British Raj, the city became a centre of revolutionary activities, such as the Chuar Rebellion (1767–1833) and the Bhumij rebellion (1832–1833). The Zilla School, now known as Midnapore Collegiate School was the birthplace of many extremist activities. Teachers like Hemchandra Kanungo inspired and guided the pupils to participate in the Indian Freedom Movement. Three British District Magistrates were assassinated in succession by the revolutionaries Bimal Dasgupta, Jyothi Jibon Ghosh, Pradyot Kumar Bhattacharya, Prabhakangsu Pal, Mrigan Dutta, Anath Bandhu Panja, Ramkrishna Roy, Braja Kishor Chakraborty, Nirmal Jibon Ghosh. Khudiram Bose and Satyendranath Basu were some of the young men that laid down their lives for the freedom of India. Kazi Nazrul Islam attended political meetings in Midnapore in the 1920s. Raja Narendra Lal Khan, ruler of Narajole, who donated his palace for Midnapore's first college for women, had been implicated, for planting a bomb.

Khudiram Bose was born in the Habibpur in 1889 and studied at Tamluk and the Midnapore Collegiate School up to the eight standard. He was first caught by a policeman for distributing seditious leaflets in Midnapore in 1906. He was an anarchist and protested against the moderate policies of Surendranath Banerjea. Khudiram was sentenced to death for a failed attempt to kill Magistrate Kingsford. Satyendranath was executed on 21 November 1908. Noted freedom fighter and Bengal Province Congress Committee President Birendranath Sasmal practised at the Midnapore High Court.

Rishi Rajnarayan Basu, one-time tutor of Rabindranath Tagore, Asia's first Nobel Prize winner, was headmaster of the Zila School in 1850. He founded a girls' school, a night school for workers, and a public library. The Rajnarayan Basu Pathagar library is still in existence near Golkuar Chowk.

Not only Hindu activists, but also Muslim statesmen originated or spent time in Midnapore. Huseyn Shaheed Suhrawardy Second Chief Minister of Bengal during British Period, Prominent leader of Awami league, a major political party in Bangladesh, and the fifth Prime Minister of Pakistan, hailed from a prominent family of Midnapore.

The Mallick Zamindars also ruled over an extensively large area during the British rule. They also built the Jagannath Temple of Midnapore. The Zamindari house declined after independence but the palace can still be seen at Mallick Chowk at Barabazaar. The palace also has a Durga manch in it and a Krishna temple in it.

The Hijli Kingdom, also known as the Khasalgarh Kingdom, was another local ruling dynasty.

The conflict began in 1359 CE when King Haridas offered support to Sikandar Shah, the Sultan of Gaur, only on the condition that he stop the oppression of the Hindu population. The Sultan rejected this condition and eventually lost against Delhi.

In 1367 CE, Sikandar Shah suddenly attacked Hijli with 80,000 Pathan soldiers and a large navy. King Haridas, along with his powerful Mahishya army and navy, stood firm on the banks of the Rasulpur River, and won in the ensuing conflict.

== Geography ==
Cities and towns in Medinpur Sadar subdivision of Paschim Medinipur district
M: municipal city/ town, CT: census town, R: rural/ urban centre, H: historical/ religious centre, F: facilities
Owing to space constraints in the small map, the actual locations in a larger map may vary slightly

pp

=== Location ===
Midnapore is located at 22.25°N 87.65°E and is 23 metres above sea-level.

Note: The map alongside presents some of the notable locations in the subdivision. All places marked in the map are linked in the larger full screen map.

=== Climate ===
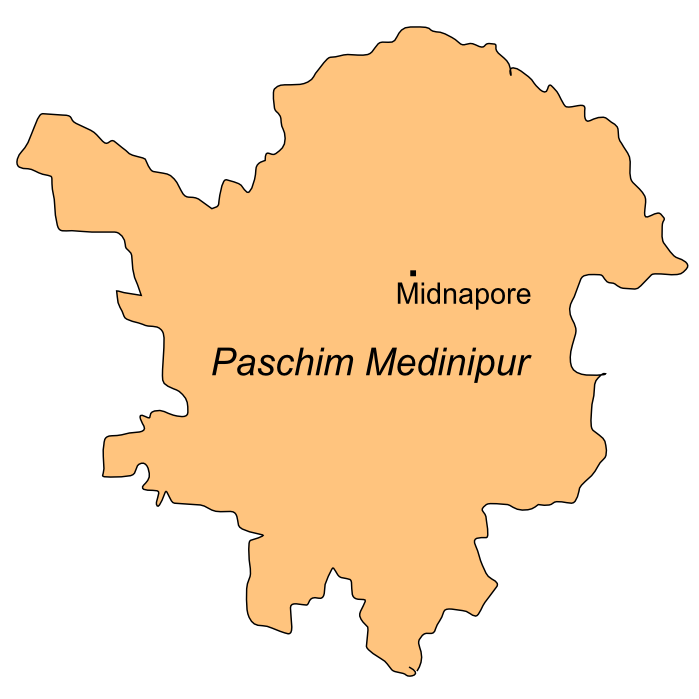
Map of Paschim Medinipur district showing Midnapore

The climate follows a hot tropical monsoon weather pattern. Summers last from April to mid-June with diurnal highs ranging from the upper 30s°C to the mid 40s°C and lows in the low 30s°C. Daily heat is often followed by evening rains known as kalboishakhis or dust-storms (loo). Monsoon rains can last from mid-June to late August or even September, with rains from the southeast monsoon contributing most of the annual rainfall of around 1500 mm. Winters last for 2 to 3 months and are mild; typical lows are from 8 °C – 14 °C. Allergies are common in winter and spring due to the high content of particulate dust in the air.

Soils near the Kangsabati River are alluvial with a high-degree of clay or sand, whereas soils towards Rangamati are lateritic. Vegetation includes eucalyptus and sal forests on the northwest side of town. The sal forests form part of the Dalma Hills, Bengal-Jharkhand Range. Arabari, the forest range which was the site of India's first Joint Forest Management scheme, is only 30 km away. Elephant attacks on humans are common in this area, although the town itself has never been attacked. Hordes of marauding elephants attacking human habitation in villages in Midnapore district have come as close to the town as Gurguripal, 6 km away.

Climate data for Midnapore (1991–2020, extremes 1901–2020)
Month	Jan	Feb	Mar	Apr	May	Jun	Jul	Aug	Sep	Oct	Nov	Dec	Year
Record high °C (°F)	35.7 (96.3)	37.9 (100.2)	42.8 (109.0)	45.6 (114.1)	47.0 (116.6)	47.2 (117.0)	39.8 (103.6)	38.0 (100.4)	37.4 (99.3)	36.1 (97.0)	35.2 (95.4)	32.4 (90.3)	47.2 (117.0)
Mean daily maximum °C (°F)	25.1 (77.2)	29.1 (84.4)	33.7 (92.7)	36.6 (97.9)	36.5 (97.7)	34.6 (94.3)	32.4 (90.3)	32.1 (89.8)	32.1 (89.8)	31.5 (88.7)	29.2 (84.6)	25.9 (78.6)	31.5 (88.7)
Mean daily minimum °C (°F)	13.5 (56.3)	17.3 (63.1)	21.7 (71.1)	24.8 (76.6)	26.0 (78.8)	26.6 (79.9)	26.3 (79.3)	26.2 (79.2)	25.8 (78.4)	23.6 (74.5)	18.8 (65.8)	14.3 (57.7)	22.0 (71.6)
Record low °C (°F)	5.0 (41.0)	5.6 (42.1)	11.1 (52.0)	16.8 (62.2)	16.4 (61.5)	18.9 (66.0)	20.5 (68.9)	21.3 (70.3)	20.0 (68.0)	15.5 (59.9)	9.4 (48.9)	6.0 (42.8)	5.0 (41.0)
Average rainfall mm (inches)	14.4 (0.57)	20.0 (0.79)	40.2 (1.58)	60.1 (2.37)	147.3 (5.80)	282.1 (11.11)	339.7 (13.37)	319.8 (12.59)	256.3 (10.09)	105.0 (4.13)	16.3 (0.64)	7.3 (0.29)	1,608.5 (63.33)
Average rainy days	1.2	1.2	2.5	4.3	7.7	11.1	15.9	16.2	12.1	5.1	1.0	0.6	78.8
Average relative humidity (%) (at 17:30 IST)	57	49	47	56	63	75	83	84	83	78	67	61	67
Source: India Meteorological Department

== Transportation ==
=== Train ===
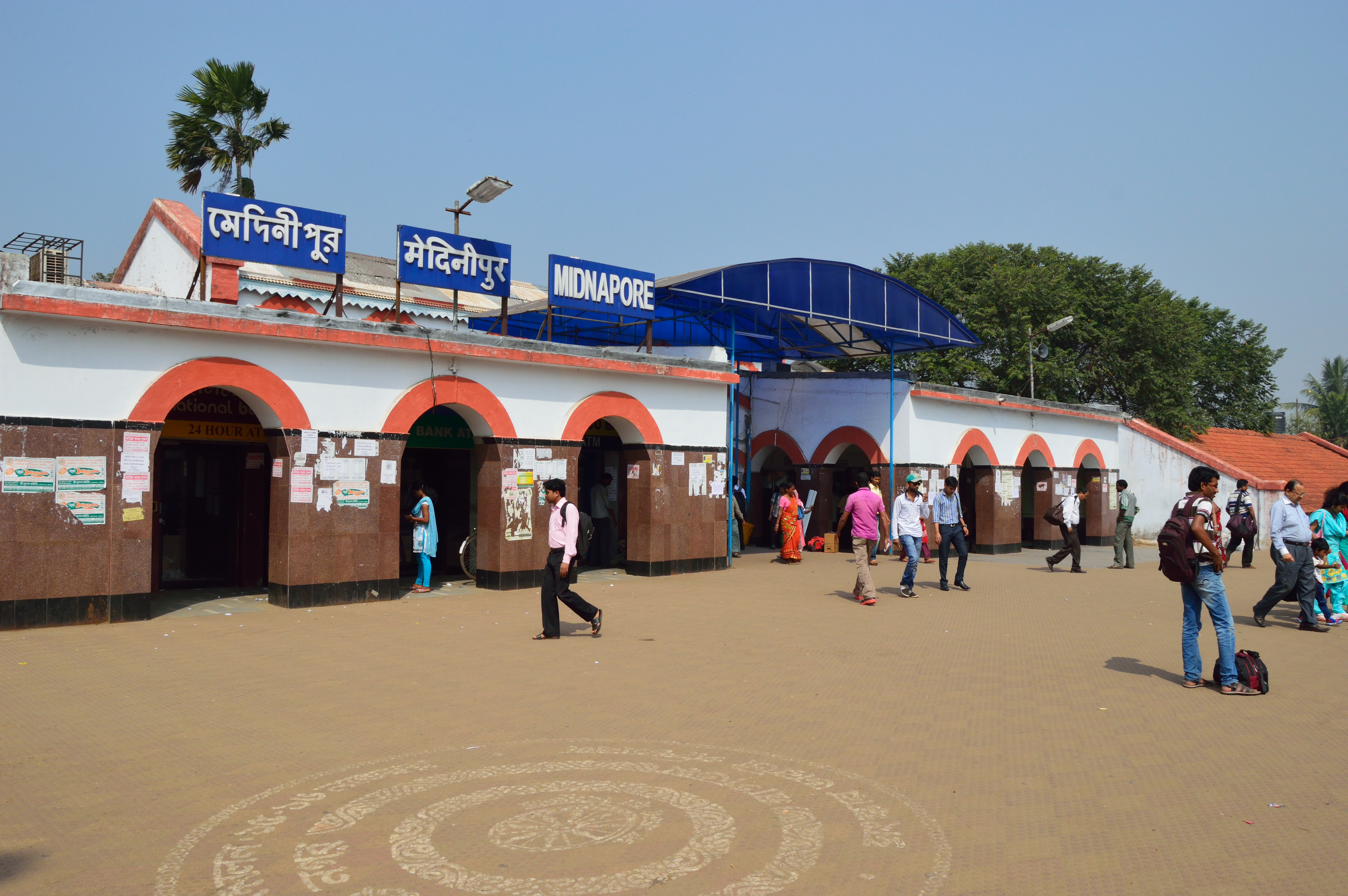
Midnapore Railway Station

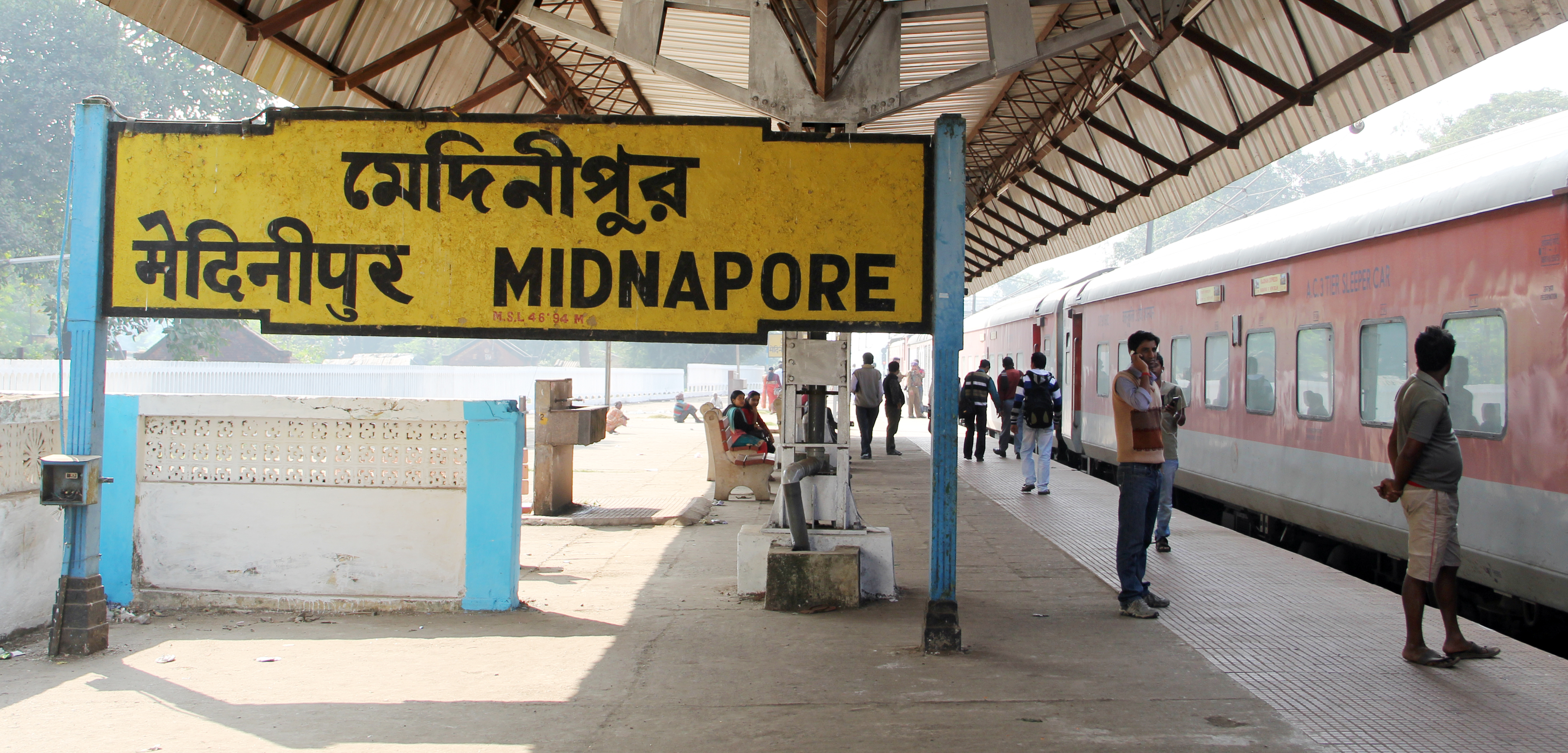
Midnapore Station Platform

Midnapore railway station is connected not only to larger cities in the region, but also to smaller towns and villages in the district. This railway station is situated on the Kharagpur–Bankura–Adra line. Many local and passenger trains ply all day between Howrah and Midnapore as well as Adra and Midnapore. Apart from these local trains, many major express trains also pass through Midnapore including the Jhargram-Medinipur Jangalmahal Express, Delhi-Puri Nandan Kanan Express, Howrah-Lokmanya Tilak Terminus Samarsatta Express, Puri-Patna Express, Ernakulam-Patna Express, Malda Town-Digha Express etc. Midnapore is close to Kharagpur, a major hub of the South Eastern Railway is 13 kilometres.

At present the Midnapore Railway Section is undergoing a development process. The station complex is undergoing modernisation. The platforms are being increased in length. Work is in process to double the railway line between Kharagpur Junction and Midnapore railway station. Apart from an existing railway bridge on the Kangsabati river, a new double line railway bridge has been constructed (carrying traffic from 4 March 2012) to smoothen the railway traffic.

=== Local transportation ===
Selected thoroughfares of Midnapore have been expanded and maintained in an ongoing "Megacity" project started in 1997. The major roads are now upgraded, well lighted and one way with divider. A long-awaited flyover connecting Rangamati over the railway gate minimised the traffic congestion at rush hours. Some of the smaller roads in the city are still unpaved and are difficult to use during and after the monsoon months. To compound the problems faced by inhabitants there are a limited number of bridges crossing the Kasai River affording entry from Howrah and Kolkata (NH6). Nevertheless, the ongoing construction of the new interstate highway system which passes by Midnapore has reduced the time it takes for inhabitants to reach Kolkata. A set of traffic control signals was recently installed in the city, and this helps control traffic. Motorized and bicycle traffic has been increasing in recent years. Within the city, previously cycle rickshaws were one of the few modes of public transportation since effective lobbying by rickshaw-pullers who depend on this for their livelihood had prevented the introduction of town buses and auto rickshaws. Now auto-rickshaws covering the different routes of the city like Railway station, Vidyasagar University, Amtala, Central bus stand, Battala, golkunwar chawk, sipoy bazar by sharing basis, which is a big boost for the city's development.

== Infrastructure and economy ==
Electricity is available in ample amount. With time, Power outages are becoming more uncommon. Most businesses and upper middle-class and rich households have backup generators and batteries that they use in times of outages.

Water supply has become more consistent than the past. Most of the water comes from the Kangsabati river. The municipal water supply is free and ample; tap water is available for about an hour twice a day and is stored by those who can, in plastic, metal, or concrete reservoirs or in buckets. The water is of questionable purity prompting the proliferation of individual water purification units.

At present, most middle and upper class households have water pumps installed in their household for daily use, which allows them not to rely on the municipal water, preventing over exploitation of the river.

Sewage disposal is a concern. Many of the lower income-communities in the city do not have adequate plumbing and must rely on refuse-collectors to haul out human waste. Not all drains are covered, causing a proliferation of disease causing flies and mosquitoes. Since Midnapore is drier than many other coastal and humid low-lying towns of West Bengal, this problem is not as acute as it.

== Demographics ==
Historical population
Year	Pop.	±%
1872	31,491	—
1881	33,560	+6.6%
1891	32,264	−3.9%
1901	33,140	+2.7%
1911	32,740	−1.2%
1921	28,965	−11.5%
1931	32,021	+10.6%
1941	43,171	+34.8%
1951	45,476	+5.3%
1961	59,532	+30.9%
1971	71,326	+19.8%
1981	86,118	+20.7%
Source: Census of India

St. John's Church

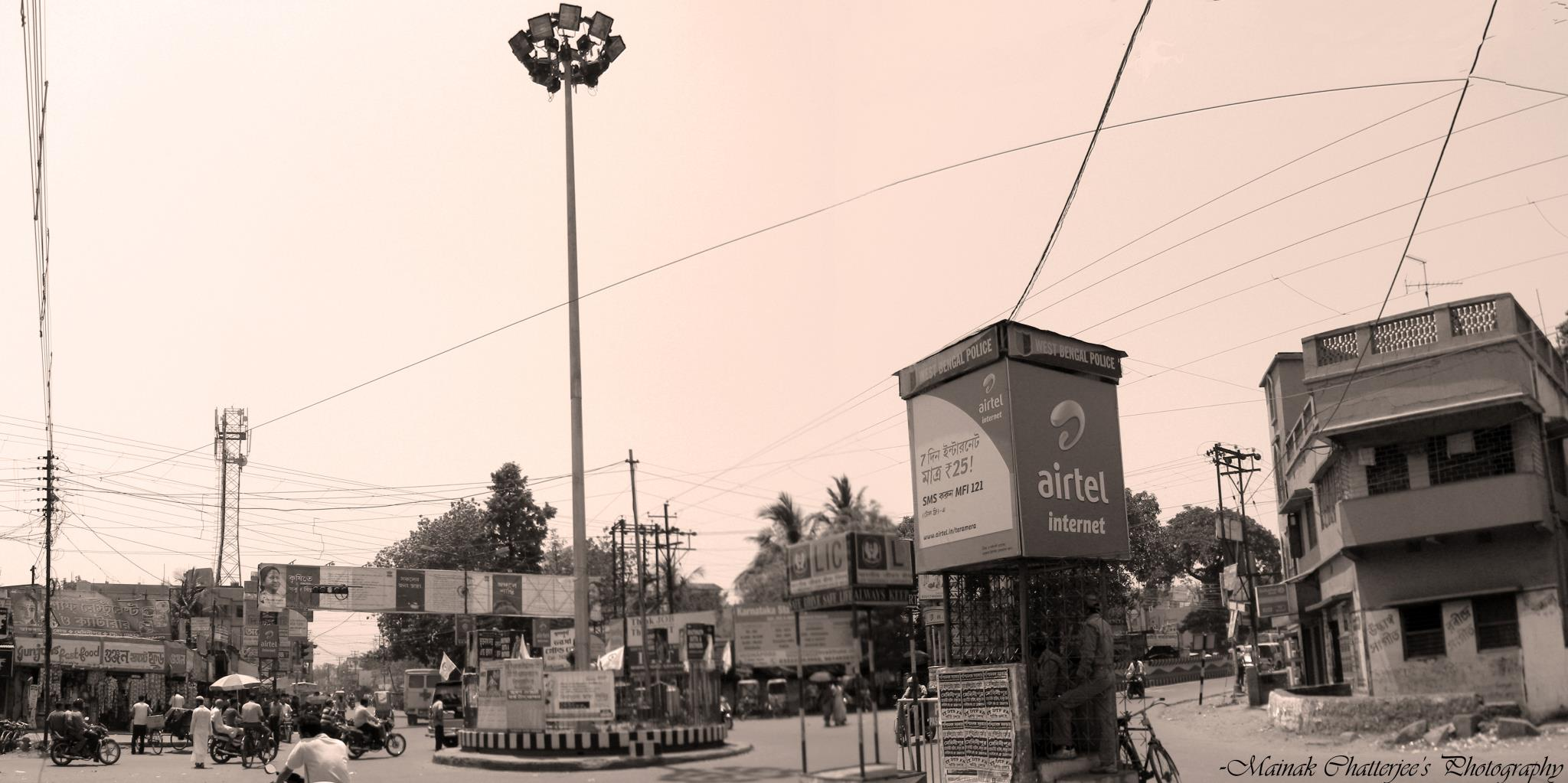
Midnapur Keranitola

In the 2011 census, Midnapore municipality had a population of 169,264, out of which 84,977 were males and 84,287 were females. The 0–6 years population was 15,172. Effective literacy rate for the 7+ population was 88.99 per cent.

As of 2001 India census, Medinipur had a population of 153,349. Medinipur has an average literacy rate of 75%, higher than the national average of 59.5%: male literacy is 80%, and female literacy is 71%. In Medinipur, 10% of the population is under 6 years of age.

This makes it the second largest city in Paschim Medinipur district after Kharagpur. The city has a Hindus population of 139,827 and Muslims population of 27,238. The multiple mosques and temples, many predating British rule serve as indication of how co-prevalent the two religions are in this area. It is an important religious spot for the Muslims of India and Bangladesh. Even though the interesting religious mixture would suggest religious tensions, remarkably Midnapore has never witnessed major Hindu-Muslim tensions in recent history.

The population of the city in 2022 is estimated to have crossed 190,000 due to high urbanisation and modernisation in recent times, which has caused a lot of immigration from all over the district.

== Police station ==
Midnapore police station has jurisdiction over Midnapore municipality and Midnapore Sadar CD Block.

== Economy ==
The economy of the undivided district, according to 1991 and 2001 census statistics, was overwhelmingly agrarian. Being a district town, Midnapore functioned in an ancillary role for the rural district as an administrative and judicial centre. As such many businesses and services revolved around this role, which naturally, has been adversely affected by the division of the district. Midnapore still fills this role and has more physicians, lawyers, teachers, banks, and administrative offices than any other town in either East or West Midnapore district. The medical sector is thriving with the addition of a Medical college and the Vidyasagar Institute of Health Application. Coaching centres that assist students enrolled in the regular and correspondence courses of Vidyasagar University are also common.

Poorer segments of this semi-rural society are involved in transportation, basic agriculture, small shops and manual labour for construction work.

However, the picture has changed lately. Today, Midnapore is a commercial and agricultural hub in the district of Paschim Medinipur. The majority is middle class, with a few upper-class people living in the posh neighbourhoods of the city. High rise towers are also becoming frequent in the city.

== Civic affairs ==
Midnapore is a municipality with 24 wards and 94,738 registered voters (2003 statistics). For a long period of 32 years, it was under the control of the Left Front, in 2009 Trinamool Congress won the municipality by a margin of 2 wards. Then the number of wards were increased to 25 and wards were renumbered in 2013.

== Culture ==
=== Historic attractions ===
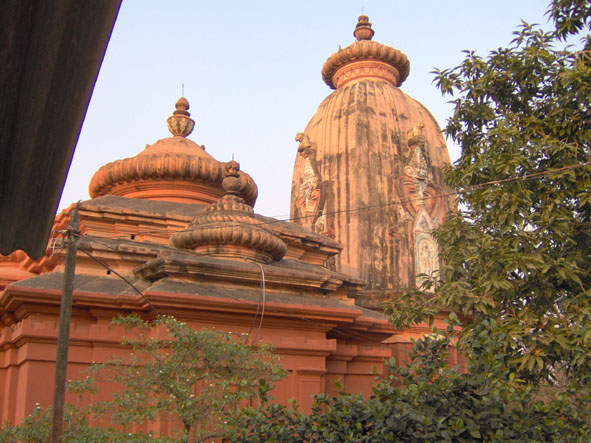
Chapaleswar (Shiva) temple, Karnagarh

The Chapaleswar and Mahamaya temples at Karnagarh built in the Odisha style of temple architecture aka Kalinga Architecture, 10 km north of the town, are two of the most popular temples. Both were built in the 10th century by Karna Keshari of Keshari/Soma Vamsi Dynasty of Odisha. This temple is also of historic importance as being a hotspot of the Chuar Revolt during the Indian Independence Movement.

Outstanding Hindu and Jain temples are also located in the village of Pathra, a few kilometres from the town. Hundreds of small temples dating back into antiquity are located here but many are in a state of disrepair due in part to lack of any sort of preservation, succumbing to the waters of the Kasai River, and theft of bricks by locals. An NGO Pathra Archaeological Preservation Committee, founded by Yeasin Pathan, has successfully persuaded the Archaeological Survey of India to restore the temples. 2,000,000 Indian rupees were donated for this cause in 1998 and many of the temples have been restored. Remarkably secluded in location, this archaeological site is rarely visited as it is inaccessible and little known outside of the immediate area.

The Jagannath Temple at Nutan Bazar was built in 1851, possibly at the request of a descendant of the Ganga dynasty of Odisha. Other temples from the eighteenth century include the Hanuman-jeu Temple in Mirzabazar, the Shitala temple at Barabazar, and the Habibpur Kali Temple. One of the oldest temples in the town is the Rukmini temple at Nutanbazar which was built in the 17th century. The Ramakrishna Mission also has a temple adjacent to an elementary and high school. The goddess Kali at the Battala temple is an important temple in the locality, but is a more recent addition.

There are numerous mazars and dargahs dotting the city. Jora Masjid is the most notable in the town and is the site of a notable annual urs. Among the mazars, Dewan Baba's mazar near the District Court and Fakir Kua near the bus terminus are locally revered. According to local legend, the water of the well at Fakir Kua majar has mysterious healing powers, although the veracity of this claim is debatable. There are two old churches in the town. St. John's Church, Midnapore was built in 1851 and the Medinipur Baptist Church which was built in 1863. In the heyday of Brahmo Samaj, Midnapore became a major centre of this society. Rishi Rajnarayan Basu, one of the luminaries in the Brahmo Samaj movement, worked as the head master of the Zilla School. The dilapidated hall of Brahmo Samaj, "Brahmo Samaj Mandir" near Midnapore Collegiate School is a silent reminder of the Brahmo presence of yesteryears. Some of the old administrative and educational buildings dating back more than 150 years are still functioning today.

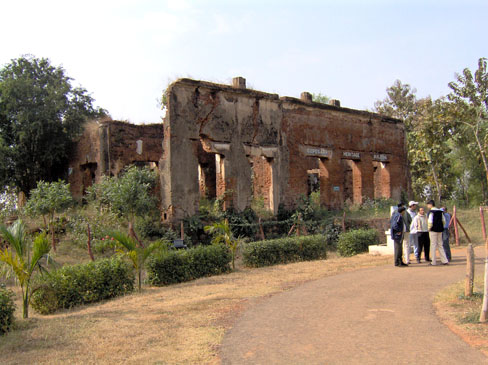
The royal ruins at Gopegarh Heritage Park

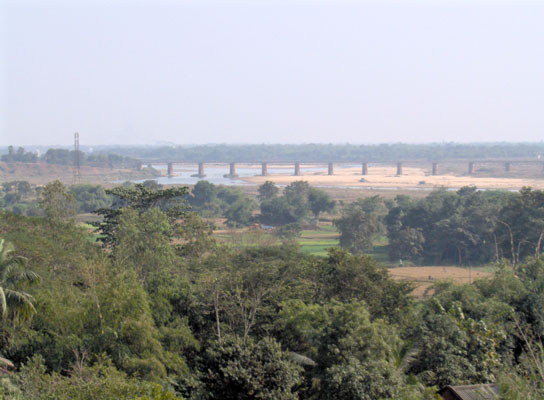
A view of the Kasai from Gopegarh Heritage Park

=== Cultural distinctiveness ===
Life in Midnapore moves at a relatively leisurely pace, reflecting the city’s character as a traditional provincial centre in the mofussil region. The people of Midnapore, known as Midnaporeans, are generally laid-back, warm, and friendly. It is not unusual for shops to open late or close for a few hours in the afternoon during the hotter months of the year. Some shops also close temporarily so their owners can enjoy a cup of tea or watch major sporting events, particularly cricket matches and the FIFA World Cup.

Tea shops and paan stalls are a common sight throughout the city, alongside a high concentration of mishtir dokaan (sweet shops). Midnapore is also home to some of Bengal’s notable traditional sweets, including the famous Khirayer Gogjaa. Another cherished aspect of local culture is adda—the Bengali tradition of informal, lively conversation and friendly gossip—which remains a popular pastime among the people of Midnapore..

The local Odia dialect is termed as Midnapori Odia. The local dialect of Bengali is different from standard Kolkata pronunciation and though not as Odia-centric as the dialects of Contai and Dantan, but shows similarities with Odia. Speech is very informal and the talebossho, murdhenoshho, and dontesho are often pronounced differently from the standardised West Bengal dialect.

A significant fraction of the population of the undivided district descended from Vaishnavites – the followers of Shri Chaitanya – although they follow the rituals and caste system of mainstream Hinduism now. Since at certain points in history some parts of the area was under Odisha based rulers, it is better described as a mix of Bengali and Odia culture. There are Marwari and Bhojpuri speakers and a number of speakers of Hindi in the town as well. Many of the Muslims of the town speak in a pidgin dialect with a mixture of Bengali, Hindi, Urdu, and Bhojpuri words.

=== Entertainment ===
Since many Midnaporeans are fond of walking, a number of parks have come up in recent years. Gopegarh Heritage Park is a good picnic spot for families and youth and was opened in 2001. Booking for picnic spot and boating facilities can be arranged at the ticket counter. The most popular park of the town is Sukumar Sengupta Smriti Uddan (popularly known as Police Line Park) which is near to Central Bus Stand. Other parks are Sishu Uddan and Khudiram Park. Many people can also be seen in the cooler morning and evening hours walking near the riverfront.

There are a number of major theatres in the town including the Aurora, Mahua and Hari Cinema Hall. But Aurora, Mahua are closed now, only Hari Cinema Hall is still running A number of private and government operated halls include the Zilla Parishad Hall, Vivekandanda Hall (inside Midnapore College), and Vidyasagar Hall. These are often the venue for numerous cultural events like the hosting of dramas, concerts, poetry-recitals, and dance programs. Some of these are venues for numerous "Melas" or canivals hosted each year on adjacent grounds such as the Midnapore College-collegiate ground, Church School ground (for the Christmas fair), and the river ground (for large political assemblies).

The bank of Kangsabati River (also variously known as Kasai and Cossye) is great for sightseeing and fishing and a common destination for picnics during the Christmas and New Year's breaks. The bank is being eroded by new construction, brick-kilns and new communities.

Rangamati Sarbajanin Durga Puja, 2003

=== Food ===
Midnapore possesses a distinct culinary tradition that differs from regional styles found in Kolkata and other parts of West Bengal. The region features several localized dishes and preparation methods:

- Maacher Tel Jhal: A spicy fish dish prepared primarily in West Midnapore.
- Maacher Tok: A spicy and tangy fish dish cooked with dried or raw mangoes.
- Posto Bati: A Poppy seed (posto) dish
- Khirer Goja: A traditional sweet.

=== Religious beliefs and festivals ===
In the month of Asadh, (roughly corresponding to mid-September), Rathayatra is celebrated as is the case in the rest of Odisha. A fair is hosted near the local Jagannath temple. And during Christmas, a fair on the grounds of Nirmal Hriday Ashram is well participated. The church is opened to all on this occasion and people from all communities gather in the prayer hall to view the murals narrating the life of Jesus. The resident students recreate the scene of Jesus' birth with clay models.

Apart from that, the regular festivals like Durga Puja, Saraswati Puja, and Kali Puja are well attended. In the last few years, local clubs and communities have competed with each other for designing the best Durga Puja murtis (idols), mandaps (interior of abode), and pandals (bamboo and cloth makeshift enclosures) with hundreds of thousands of rupees often being spent by each club. In recent times, the Pujas hosted by Rangamati Sharbajanin Club, Keranitola, Burdge Town, Chottobazaar, Raja Bazaar, Bidhan Nagar, Ashok Nagar, and Judge's Court have been highly rated. Other common Pujas in the worship of Shitala, Jagaddhatri, Holi, Janmashtami, Manasa, Kartika, and Ganesh are common but not such a major cause of celebration.

Vishwakarma Puja is popular in the city. Unlike in Kolkata, Vishwakarma Puja is not celebrated with flying kites. With respect to its tribal history, people in Midnapur fly Kites to celebrate "Mage Porob","Baa Porob","Baraam Puja", the day of a "Ho" tribal god. This is on the last day of the month of Poush, i.e. Poush Sankranti. Apart from kite-flying, a fair is also held on Poush Sankranti. It has a rural flavour and is characterised by the trading of handicraft and household goods. The items of trade include spades, knives and other iron tools, combs and other goods made of buffalo-horn, baskets (jhuri and dhama) and platters for husking (kula) made of bamboo and cane, etc. Bheema Puja is another Puja that is not widespread elsewhere.

And many more religious festivals are held in Midnapore each year. Urs of the venerated saint Syed Shah Murshed Ali Alquadri Al Jilani son of Syed Shah Mehr Ali Alquadri Al Baghdadi is a major occasion for Bengali Muslims of West Bengal and Bangladesh. This is held each year near the Jora masjid (twin mosques). Many devout Muslims observe fasts during the month of Ramadan, which ends in celebration at Eid ul-Fitr. Eid ul-Adha locally known as Bakhri-Eid is also celebrated. During the Remembrance of Muharram, processions throng the streets enacting mock stick-fights in remembrance of Husayn ibn Ali.

== Education ==
=== Universities ===
Science Block of Vidyasagar University

- Vidyasagar University is the only university of the city. It has a campus in the western part of the city. There are 39 colleges in the districts of East Midnapore and West Midnapore, affiliated to this university.
- On 18 May 2022, West Bengal Chief Minister Mamata Banerjee who was on an official tour in the city, declared that Midnapore College will be granted University status.

=== Colleges ===
- Midnapore College was created out of the Midnapur Collegiate School in 1873. Though an autonomous Institute was previously under Vidyasagar University and, Calcutta University. It is located in Raja Bazaar, a busy area of the city.
- Industrial Training Institute, Midnapore is a technical vocational institute located in Rangamati.
- Midnapore Homoeopathic Medical College and Hospital.
- Midnapore Law College is a relatively recent addition. This is situated at its new campus built at Rangamati.
- Midnapore Medical College and Hospital is a newborn institute, the newest medical college in West Bengal. After a lot of controversy regarding its recognition by the Medical Council of India, it has finally been permitted to conduct the MBBS course under section 10 (A) for 2005–06. Recently, BSc Nursing course has also been started.
- Raja Narendra Lal Khan Mahila Mahavidyalaya (Gope College:)- This is the only Women's College in the district. The lavish campus is located on premises donated by the Raaj rulers of Narajole.
- Vidyasagar Institute of Health, Rangamati, offers courses in Medical and Paramedical Technology.
- Oriental Institute of Science and Technology – offers postgraduate courses on Biotechnology and Biochemistry.
- Vidyasagar Teachers' Training College also known as BEd College.
- Medinipur Sadar Government Polytechnic – technical college in Midnapore town
- Midnapore Art College

=== Schools ===
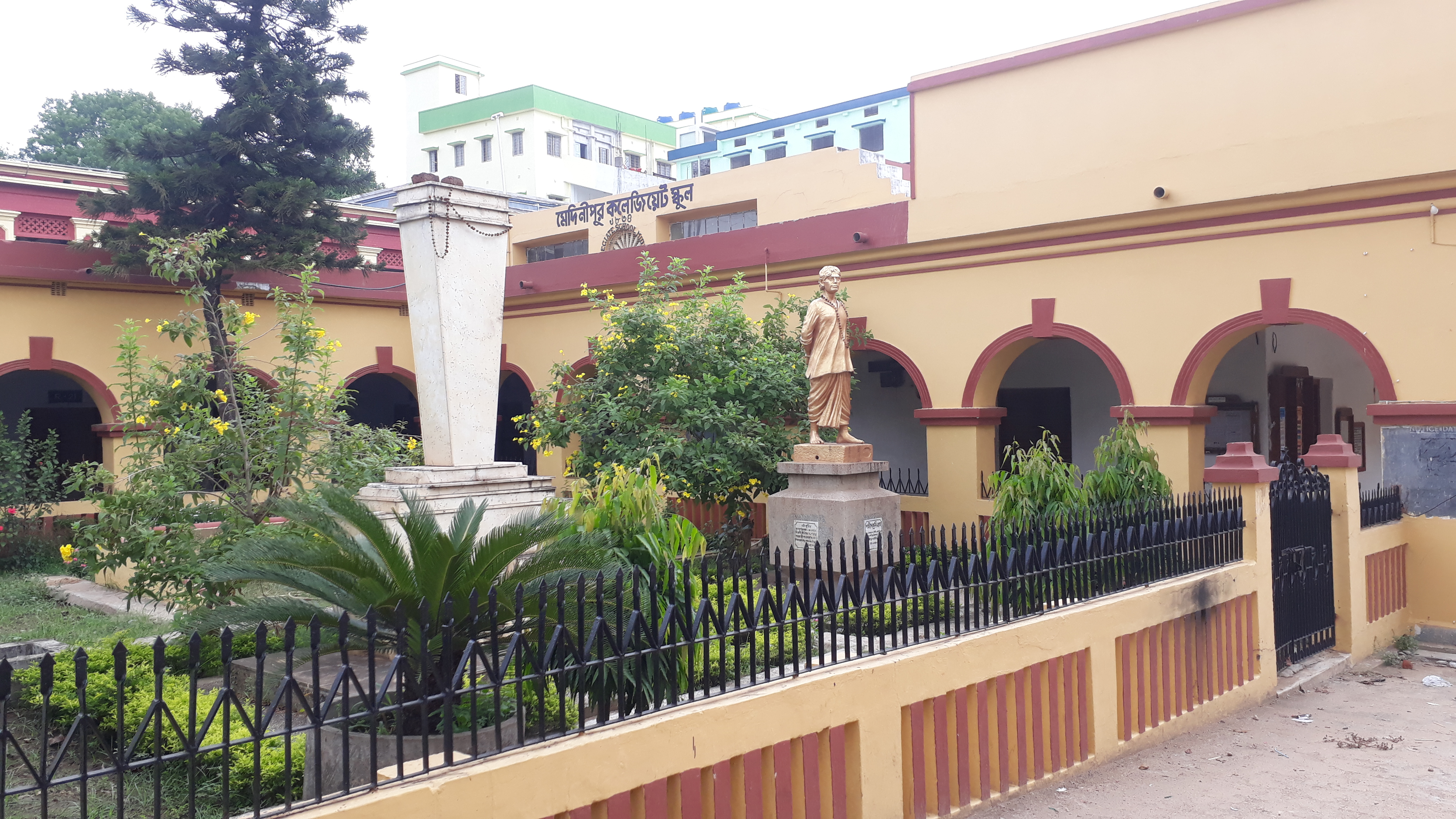
Midnapore Collegiate School

- DAV Public School, Midnapore, This is one of the CBSE affiliated school in Midnapore city managed by DAVCMC, New Delhi. This school was established in the year 1993 and initially it was sponsored & managed by Midnapore Marwari Sammelan. Later on after a year or two, it came under the control of DAVCMC, New Delhi.
- Gurguripal High School.
- Jawahar Navodaya Vidyalaya, Paschim Medinipur
- Midnapore Collegiate School (for boys) established in 1834, is one of the oldest schools in Bengal as well as India. The students and teachers of this school made contributions in Indian Freedom Movement during the British Rule. Khudiram Bose, a martyr in the freedom struggle is one of the notable alumni of this school.
- Midnapur Collegiate Girls' High School
- Midnapore Town School
- Mission Girls' High School is one of the girls' schools. Mahasweta Devi, Magsaysay Award recipient completed elementary school here.
- Keranitola Shree Shree Mohanananda Vidyamandir
- Sri Narayan Vidyabhaban Boys' High School
- Nirmal Hriday Ashram Catholic Church High School is a school run by Catholic missionaries and has both girls' and boys' section. It runs a primary section in the morning. Locally it is known as the "Church school".
- Rangamati Kironmoyee High School, popularly known as Rangamati High School.
- Aligunj Rishi Raj Narayan Balika Vidyalaya, popularly known as Aligung Girls School, is another school for girls.-
- Ramakrishna Mission Vidyabhaban, Midnapore.
- Vidyasagar Shishu Niketan, CISCE (ICSE & ISC) affiliated school in the city.
- Vidyasagar Vidyapith, popularly known as Bangla School is also a rather old institute. This has separate boys' and girls' section.
- Vidyasagar Vidyapith Girls' High School
- Royal Academy: ICSE & ISC affiliated school in the city.
- Tecnho India public school, Midnapore: one of the CBSE school In Midnapore.

== Sports ==
Many people in Midnapore town are increasingly becoming more health-conscious and going on walks and the city is a witness to which is the proliferating gyms and clubs. In sports, the most notable achievement of a native was by Susmita Singha Roy, participating at the Olympics in Beijing in 2008 as a long jumper.

The 10,000-capacity Sri Aurobindo Stadium hosts a number of sports events, including football tournaments of junior National level. The most notable footballer was Ramananda Mukherjee who later had served the Midnapore Referee Club for almost 40 years, including the president. Another footballer was Swapan Chakrabarty, who had been a national level coach. Midnapore's schools and colleges are usually well-ranked in soccer tournaments held at national level. Midnapore Sports Development Authority (MSDA) was involved in constructing a sports complex which includes a modern gymnasium and indoor stadium near Sepoy Bazar. MSDA oversees many of the sporting activities in the town.

Every year on 23 January, on the birthday of Indian freedom fighter, Subhas Chandra Bose there is a 10-mile running competition in commemoration.

== Media ==
Midnapore has an All India Radio Relay station known as Akashvani Midnapore. It broadcasts on FM frequencies.

The town is also home to Biplabi Sabyasachi a well-known Bengali daily newspaper that provides important news and information for both the local community and a wider audience.

== Notable people ==
- Khudiram Bose, revolutionary
- Anirban Bhattacharya, Bengali film actor and theatre personality
- Rajnarayan Basu, writer and proponent of Young Bengal movement
- Hemchandra Kanungo, revolutionary
- Matangini Hazra, freedom fighter
- Birendranath Sasmal, social activist
- Satish Chandra Samanta, social activist
- Nirmal Jibon Ghosh, revolutionary
- Ramkrishna Roy, revolutionary
- Anath Bondhu Panja, revolutionary
- Brajakishore Chakraborty, revolutionary
- Pradyot Kumar Bhattacharya, revolutionary
- Begum Badar un nissa Akhtar, Educationist and social reformer
- Mahasweta Devi, writer and Magsaysay Award winner
- Byomkes Chakrabarti, Linguist, writer and poet
- Mani Lal Bhaumik, Physicist
- Narayan Chandra Rana, Astrophysicist
- Suryakant Tripathi 'Nirala', Poet
- Soumya Sankar Bose, Artist and photographer
- Tamal Bandyopadhyay, one of India's most prominent Business Journalists and Author
- Khanto Bala Rai, educator
- Souhardya De, Indian author, columnist and Bal Puraskar recipient
- Jayi Rajaguru, prominent Indian freedom fighter died here.
- Ubaidullah Al Ubaidi Suhrawardy, educationist and author
- Hassan Suhrawardy, Lieutenant Colonel and British Indian diplomat
- Zahid Suhrawardy, eminent jurist and diplomat
- Hasan Shaheed Suhrawardy, noted art critic and diplomat
- Huseyn Shaheed Suhrawardy, Prime Minister of Bengal, diplomat and later Prime Minister of Pakistan.
- Shaista Suhrawardy Ikramullah, poet, activist and Pakistani diplomat
- Prabhanshu Sekhar Pal revolutionary
- Pradyot Kumar Bhattacharya revolutionary
- Bimal Dasgupta revolutionary
- Bankim Bihari Pal
- Sandip Das
