= Mary W. Bacheler =

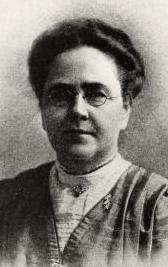
- Mary W. Bacheler, from 1922 publication.
- Born: Mary Washington Bacheler; 22 February 1860; New Hampton, New Hampshire, U.S.
- Died: 5 November 1939 (aged 79); Newton, Massachusetts, U.S.
- Education: American Baptist Historical Society
- Occupations: physician, medical missionary

Mary Washington Bacheler (February 22, 1860 – November 5, 1939) was an American physician and Baptist medical missionary in India.

== Early life ==
Mary Washington Bacheler was born February 22, 1860, in New Hampton, New Hampshire, the daughter of Rev. Otis Robinson Bacheler and his second wife, Sarah P. Merrill Bacheler. When Mary was a girl, she moved to India, where her father, a medical doctor and ordained minister, and her mother, an educator, were Baptist Christian missionaries at Midnapore. As a teen she worked with her mother, visiting and teaching women in zenana. She returned to the United States to pursue a medical degree at the Women's Medical College in New York City.

== Career ==
Bacheler completed her medical degree in 1890, and was appointed to assist her father, as the first medical missionary of the Free Baptist Woman's Missionary Society. She took over her parents' work at Midnapore when they retired in 1893. She taught school and provided medical care for women who would not see a male doctor for religious reasons. She was in the United States in 1900 for her own health, and to tend to her ailing parents (they died in 1900 and 1901). "I suppose I worked too hard after father and mother left," she recalled, "for several times I got low fever and was quite incapacitated." She spoke in New England churches while she was on leave.

Bacheler returned to India in 1903, and lived with Miss Lavina Coombs in Midnapore, until Bacheler was transferred to Balasore in 1910. The two women traveled to the United States for rest in 1912–1913. Bacheler was back in India in 1914, first helping a Miss Butts at Shantipur, and then back in Balasore to run an orphanage there. She spoke the Bengali and Odia languages fluently.

Bacheler returned to the United States in 1921 for the jubilee of the Woman's American Baptist Free Missionary Society, with Midnapore teacher Khanto Bala Rai. She retired in 1933 and left India in 1936.

== Personal life ==
Bacheler died in 1939, aged 79 years, in Newton, Massachusetts. There is a small collection of her papers at the American Baptist Historical Society archives.
