= JFM =

JFM can refer to:

- Jack FM, a radio network brand
- Jake Fraser-McGurk, an Australian cricketer
- Justice for Myanmar, a Burmese activist group
- Joseph Menna, an American sculptor-engraver who sculpted the Union Shield design used on the reverse of the 2010 Lincoln Cent
- Journal of Fluid Mechanics, a scientific journal in the field of fluid mechanics
- Jahrbuch über die Fortschritte der Mathematik, a project which has been incorporated into Zentralblatt MATH
- JFM committee, joint forest management committee
- JFM (Danish media group), a Danish media group, formerly known as Jysk Fynske Medier
- January, February, March, a 3-month season period
