= Raja Narendra Lal Khan Women's College =

Raja Narendra Lal Khan Women's College (Autonomous)
- Other name: Gope College
- Type: Undergraduate & postgraduate Public college
- Established: 1957; 69 years ago
- Academic affiliations: Vidyasagar University
- Principal: Dr. Swapna Ghorai
- Location: Gope Palace, Midnapore, West Bengal, 721102, India; 22°25′49″N 87°17′34″E
- Campus: Urban
- Website: www.rnlkwc.ac.in
- Location within West Bengal Location within India

Raja Narendra Lal Khan Women's College (Autonomous), also known as Gope College or Raja Narendra Lal Khan Mahila Mahavidyalaya, is an undergraduate and postgraduate women's college in Midnapore, West Bengal. It was established in 1957. It is affiliated with Vidyasagar University.

== History ==
This college began its journey from the historic Gope Palace on 22 August 1957. Gope Palace, built in 1895 during the time of Raja Narendra Lal Khan, the king of Narajole is now the administrative building of the College. Anjali Khan, wife of Sri Amarendra Lal Khan of the Narajole Royal Family, donated the Palace for the establishment of this College named, after the palaces' founder. The College was initially affiliated with the University of Calcutta (CU), but in 1986, the affiliation was changed from CU to the Vidyasagar University. The University Grants Commission gave autonomous status to the College from the 2018-19 session.

== Location ==
The college is situated in Kankabati Gram Panchayat, Paschim Medinipur district. It is 2 km from Midnapore Railway Station and 14 km from Kharagpur Railway Station, both under the South Eastern Railway. Midnapore Central Bus Stand is 3 km from the college.

== Departments and courses ==
This college offers different undergraduate and postgraduate courses in the science, and arts branches. This college aims at imparting education to the women undergraduates of lower- and middle-class people of Midnapore and its adjoining areas. Every department of this college offers undergraduate degree courses. Postgraduate courses are offered by few departments of this college.

=== Science ===
The science faculty consists of the departments of Chemistry, Physics, Mathematics, Computer Science and Application, Botany, Zoology, Physiology, Biotechnology, Microbiology, Economics, Remote Sensing & GIS, and Nutrition.

=== Arts ===
The arts faculty consists of the departments of Bengali, English, Hindi, Sanskrit, History, Political Science, Philosophy, Geography, Education, Physical Education & Sports, Music, Human Rights, and Psychology.

== Accreditation ==
Recently, Raja Narendra Lal Khan Women's College has been re-accredited and awarded A grade by the National Assessment and Accreditation Council (NAAC). The college is recognised by the University Grants Commission (UGC).

== See also ==
- List of institutions of higher education in West Bengal
- Education in India
- Education in West Bengal
