= Arabari =

Forest range in West Bengal, India

Arabari Forest Range
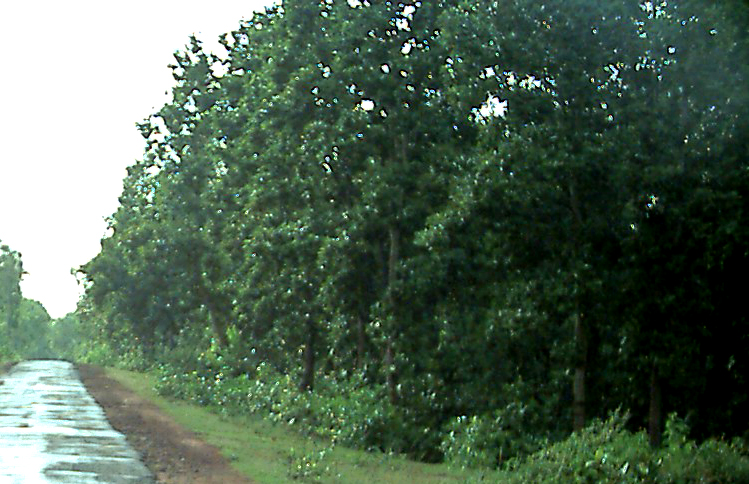
- Arabari near Midnapore

- Location within West Bengal Location within India
- Location: Midnapore, West Bengal, India
- Coordinates: 22°41′10″N 87°20′42″E
- Area: 1,272 hectares (3,140 acres)
- Established: 1972

Arabari or Arabari Forest Range, is the name of a forest range in the West Midnapore district of West Bengal, India. Conservation efforts were begun in 1972 by Divisional Forest Officer (Silviculture) Shri Ajit Kumar Banerjee, in an area of 1,272 ha by involving local people living around the forest boundary through a voluntary participation process. This process of greening the forest was brought about by setting up Joint Forest Management committees consisting of the local villagers and as result of their efforts a forest which was initially almost worthless became an economic boon to the villagers; the value of the forest area multiplied several times. Under this scheme the villagers actively involved with the conservation efforts in the forest derived the benefits of employment in silviculture and harvesting, sharing 25% of the profits from the forest produce and to collect firewood and fodder from the forest area on a nominal fee. This scheme is still practiced in Arabari.

== Geography ==
Arabari is bordered with the forests of Jhargram in West Bengal as well as other forest areas of Midnapur District. The dominant vegetation in the forest is of the hardwood sal (Shorea robusta), which is a coppiceable and commercially remunerative crop. The forest is categorized as part of the Upper Gangetic Plains moist deciduous forests. It is in the East Midnapore Forest Division in the former Midnapore district, now known as West Midnapore district, near Midnapore town. The core area of the forest is 30 kilometres (19 mi) north of Midnapore town, and 200 kilometres (120 mi) west of Calcutta.

== History ==
Before 1972, the Forest Department had been concerned about the degraded condition of the forests on the southwestern districts of West Bengal, as after take over of these forests from Zamindar in 1950s, they were in poor shape. The local villagers had no role in the operation and maintenance of the forests practised, which had even developed into frequent confrontations between them. This policy had prevented the villagers from deriving their sustenance from the forests. Earlier, the villagers had derived benefits of firewood, fodder, grazing of cattle, minor forest produce and even an income from sale of fuel wood. It was therefore feared that the situation would encourage militancy by Naxalites (Communist guerrilla groups in India) to become active in the area.

To remedy this situation, the Forest Department selected the degraded forest range of Arabari and involved the local villagers in its management and conservation. A.K Banerji, District Forest Officer (DFO), who was chosen for the task, actively sought out the local villagers in the neighborhood around the selected 1,272 hectares (3,140 acres) of forest area. He impressed on them the importance of forest protection and regeneration for their own benefit. He assured them that their livelihood would be protected from their participation in the conservation effort, which would be done during the lean period of their activity. He not only promised the villagers employment under the various ongoing rural employment schemes, but also allowed them to raise crops such as paddy, fodder, sabai grass, maize and groundnuts. He even allowed them to establish honeybee hives in the eucalyptus forest areas as a trial measure. He offered incentives to the villagers for their participation in the conservation effort by giving employment in the silviculture and harvesting operations, and also allowed them to gather firewood and fodder from the forest for a nominal charge. Villagers were also given poles for building their houses including for repairs, to make cots for sale at subsidized rates. The participating villagers were given exclusive rights to all minor forest products such as sal, kendu leaves, dry twigs, seeds. This resulted in a dramatic transformation of the forest, which had been valued as worthless to a property worth Rs 12.5 crores in 1983. The voluntary participation by the villagers was formalized in the form of a Joint Forest Management (JFM) committee, which was the first of its kind. The process has worked well and has been replicated in West Bengal from 1987 and also in the rest of the country.

== See also ==
- Joint Forest Management
- Indian Council of Forestry Research and Education

== Bibliography ==
- Deep, Jeevan. Periwinkle Environmental Education Part X. Jeevandeep Prakashan Pvt Ltd. ISBN 978-81-7744-494-0.
- Jana, Bipal Kr.; Majumder, Mrinmoy (27 June 2010). Impact of Climate Change on Natural Resource Management. Springer Science & Business Media. ISBN 978-90-481-3581-3.
- Sinha, Himadri (2006). People and Forest: Unfolding the Participation Mystique. Concept Publishing Company. ISBN 978-81-8069-246-8.
