= Mission Girls' High School =

Location
- Midnapore, West Bengal, 721101; India; 22.4328299°N 87.3196584°E

Information
- Type: Girls' school
- Established: 1868
- School district: Paschim Medinipur

Mission Girls' High School, established in 1868, is one of the oldest schools for girls in Midnapore town, West Bengal, India.

The school follows the course curricula of West Bengal Board of Secondary Education (WBBSE) and West Bengal Council of Higher Secondary Education (WBCHSE) for Standard 10th and 12th Board examinations respectively.

== History ==
Khanto Bala Rai was headmistress of the Midnapore Mission Girls' School starting in 1923. "In executive ability, tact with teachers, pupils, and patrons, and keen insight into the needs and opportunities of the school Miss Rai has shown her real worth and has greatly strengthened the school," noted a 1924 report. She described the challenges of a growing school in a 1925 letter to American Baptists. She was still principal of the school in a 1926 update.

== Notable alumni ==
- Khanto Bala Rai
- Mahasweta Devi

== See also ==
- Education in India
- List of schools in India
- Education in West Bengal
