= Industrial Training Institute, Midnapore =

Educational institution in West Bengal, India

- Type: Training College
- Established: 1967
- Affiliations: West Bengal State Council for Vocational Training
- Location: Midnapore, West Bengal, India; 22°25′12.38″N 87°17′54.56″E
- Campus: Urban
- Website: www.itimidnapore.org.in

Industrial Training Institute, Midnapore known as Govt ITI Midnapore. This Institute established in 1967, is one of the oldest government vocational training institute located in Rangamati, Midnapore, West Bengal. This ITI offers different training courses on Carpenter, Electrician, Fitter, Foundryman, Machinist, Turner, Welder, Wireman, Sheet Metal Worker.
