= Ajit Kumar Banerjee =

Indian environmentalist

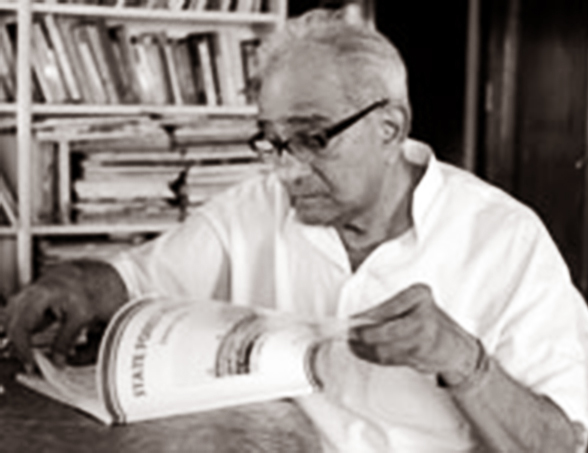
- Dr. Ajit Kumar Banerjee
- Born: 1 September 1931; Kalighat,Calcutta, Bengal Presidency, British India
- Died: 29 November 2014 (aged 83); Kolkata, West Bengal, India
- Occupations: Forest Expert, Environmentalist

Dr Ajit Kumar Banerjee (Bengali: ড. অজিত কুমার ব্যানার্জী) (1 September 1931 – 29 November 2014) was a noted environmentalist and expert in forest management and is known to be the father of the concept of Joint Forest Management, often abbreviated as JFM. Banerjee received global attention for the Arabari project in West Bengal, India where he introduced the JFM concept for the first time in 1972.

== Early life and education ==
Dr Banerjee was born to Sudha Madhab Banerjee and Utsa Rani Banerjee, in an elite family located at Kalighat, West Bengal. His grand parents were Amrita Banerjee and Tufan Tarangini Debi. He went to Ballygunge Government High School and then graduated from Presidency College, Kolkata. He acquired PhD from University of Toronto.

== Career in Indian Forest Service in West Bengal ==
The concept of Joint Forest Management was originated by Dr. Ajit K Banerjee. The major hardwood of Arabari is sal, a commercially profitable forest crop. In 1972, Dr. Banerjee, a silviculturist, then working for the Forest Department as the Divisional Forest Officer in West Bengal, was conducting trials which were constantly being disturbed by grazing and illegal harvesting by the local populace. At the time there were no initiatives for sharing of forest resources between the government and the local people. The forest official, against the suggestions of his co-workers, sought out representatives of eleven local villages and negotiated the terms of a contract with an ad hoc Forest Protection Committee. The initial program involved 612 families managing 12.7 square kilometers of forests classified as "degraded". 25% of profits from the forests were shared with the villagers. The Government did not approve the scheme initially, but when International acclamation started reaching in, the JFM was accepted and expanded to other parts of the state during 1987 and onward..

JFM is the official and popular term in India for partnerships in forest movement involving both the state forest departments and local communities. The policies and objectives of Joint Forest Movement are detailed in the Indian comprehensive National Forest Policy of 1988 and the Joint Forest Management Guidelines of 1990 of the Government of India.

Although schemes vary from state to state and are known by different names in different Indian languages, usually a village committee known as the Forest Protection Committee (FPC) and the Forest Department enter into a JFM agreement. Villagers agree to assist in the safeguarding of forest resources through protection from fire, grazing, and illegal harvesting in exchange for which they receive non-timber forest products and a share of the revenue from the sale of timber products.

== Career ==
In the mid-1980s, Dr. Banerjee joined the World Bank, and drew attention of the Bank to the success of his innovative project in Medinipur. The Bank funded the West Bengal Social Forestry Project which was restructured in 1987 to include a JFM component. The West Bengal Forest Directorate issued a Circular in 1989 to officially endorse the JFM approach, and in 1990, the government agreed to entitle the FPCs to a quarter of the net profits from the sale of timber.

Banerjee acted as a senior forestry specialist in the Environment and Natural Resources Division of the Asia Technical Department of the World Bank. He also acted as a national trustee and chairman of the Eastern Regional Committee of the WWF. He was also president of CEMO, FACE, secretary of the Kolkata chapter of Transparency International, and member of IDSK.

== Legacy ==
He wrote many books, reports, chapters of books, articles in technical journals as well as in popular News paper articles, etc. Some of the publications of Dr. Ajit Kumar Banerjee are noted below:

- Banerjee, A. K. (1989). Shrubs in Tropical Forest Ecosystems: Examples from India, The World Bank technical paper no. 103, The World Bank: Washington DC.
- Banerjee, A. K. (1995). Rehabilitation of Degraded Forests in Asia, The World Bank technical paper no. 270, The World Bank: Washington DC, ISSN 0253-7494.
- Banerjee, A. K. (1997). Decentralization and Devolution of Forest Management in Asia and the Pacific, Asia-Pacific Forestry Commission, Working Paper No: APFSOS/WP/21, FAO: Forestry Policy and Planning Division, Rome.
- Banerjee, Ajit Kumar (2004). Participatory Forest Management in West Bengal: A Review of Policies and Implementation.
- Banerjee, Ajit Kumar (2007). Joint Forest Management in West Bengal, in Forests, People and Power, The Political Ecology of Reform in South Asia, eds. Springate-Baginski, Oliver and Blaikie, Piers, Earthscan: New York, pp. 221–258.

== Death ==
Banerjee died at his residence at No. 9, Greek Church Row Extension, Kolkata 700026 on 29 November 2014, and survived by his wife, son Dr. Arindam Banerjee who is an orthopedic surgeon, daughter-in-law and grand son.
