= Bankim Bihari Pal =

Indian revolutionary leader and politician

- Born: 1 July 1905 Medinipur, India
- Died: 31 December 1979 (aged 74) Medinipur
- Occupation: Freedom Fighter, Elected Official

Bankim Bihari Pal (1 July 1905 – 31 December 1979) was a revolutionary in British India and a politician after Indian Independence in 1947.

== Early life and education ==
Pal was born on 1 July 1905 in Medinipur, in the present Purba Medinipur district into a Hindu family. He was involved in political activities from his school days. Although he was a supporter of Gandhi's nonviolence movement, he supported his BV friends for some time. He was worked for them as a middleman between the BV Swadeshi dacoits and BV action squad members. For that reason he includes women from prostitute areas.

== Later activities ==
In 1940, he participated in the Satyagraha movement of Gandhi. In August 1942, he played a lead role in launching an anti-British movement in undivided Midnapore. He started a Roadshow (Swadeshi Street dramas) for the first time in Midnapore. For that reason he wrote several plays, acted and directed himself with the help of local people and prostitutes. After the independence of India, Pal won several elections as a councillor in Midnapore Municipality, which included the Midnapore seat of West Bengal Assembly in 1977, as a Janata Party member. He founded the Shahid Prososti Samiti. He died on 31 December 1979, owing to prolonged sickness.
