= Pathra, Paschim Medinipur =

Pathra
- Village
- Location in West Bengal, India Pathra (India)
- Coordinates: 22.4146°N 87.4193°E
- Country: India
- State: West Bengal
- District: Paschim Medinipur

Population (2011)
  - Total: 3,356

Languages*
  - Official: Bengali, Santali, English
- Time zone: UTC+5:30 (IST)
- PIN: 721135
- Telephone/STD code: 03221
- Lok Sabha constituency: Medinipur
- Vidhan Sabha constituency: Kharagur
- Website: paschimmedinipur.gov.in

Pathra is a village and a gram panchayat in the Midnapore Sadar CD block in the Medinipur Sadar subdivision of the Paschim Medinipur district in the state of West Bengal, India.

== Geography ==
Cities and towns in Medinpur Sadar subdivision of Paschim Medinipur district
M: municipal city/ town, CT: census town, R: rural/ urban centre, H: historical/ religious centre, F: facilities
Owing to space constraints in the small map, the actual locations in a larger map may vary slightly

=== Location ===
Pathra is located at 22.4146°N 87.4193°E.

=== Area overview ===
Paschim Medinipur district (before separation of Jhargram) had a total forest area of 1,700 km^{2}, accounting for 14.31% of the total forested area of the state. It is obvious from the map of the Midnapore Sadar subdivision, placed alongside, is that there are large stretches of forests in the subdivision. The soil is predominantly lateritic. Around 30% of the population of the district resides in this subdivision. 13.95% of the population lives in urban areas and 86.05% lives in the rural areas.

Note: The map alongside presents some of the notable locations in the subdivision. All places marked in the map are linked in the larger full screen map.

== Demographics ==
According to the 2011 Census of India, Pathra had a total population of 3,356, of which 1,726 (51%) were males and 1,639 (49%) were females. There were 495 persons in the age range of 0–6 years. The total number of literate persons in Pathra was 1,921 (67.14% of the population over 6 years).

.*For language details see Midnapore Sadar (community development block)#Language and religion

== Culture ==
Pathra is a village of temples with hundreds of small temples. Unfortunately, many of the temples are in bad shape because of lack of preservation, damage by the Kangsabati and vandalizing by the locals. There are 34 temples with "enriched terracotta artwork". Those deserving a special mention are the naba-ratna temple, kachari mahal, rasmancha, dalan of Kalachand, Durgeswar temple and Pancha Shiva temple.

Most of the temples were built by the Ghosal (later changed to Majumdar) and Banerjee families. Under the Nawabs of Bengal, these families were appointed to hereditary feudatory positions and Bidyananda Ghoshal, who established the Ghoshal-Majumdar line in Pathra, was originally a revenue collector of the Ratnachawk Pargana under Nawab Alivardi Khan. The decline started when the rich families shifted base. However, with the persistent efforts of a small group of enthusiasts, Pathra has turned the tide. Due to the continuous efforts of Yasin Pathan, the Archaeological Survey of India has taken charge of 28 temples and have repaired 18 temples. Pathra Archeological Preservation Committee, a non-government organization, also looks after the structures.

A major attraction is the 250-year old, 40 feet high Nava-ratna temple. There is a small at-chala temple in the same compound. Located nearby are three at-chalas and a pancha-ratna temple. Behind the cluster is a Durga dalan. Some distance away is another group of pancha-ratna temples. The Sitala temple (also known as Burimar than) is also 40 feet high. Other important temples are Sarbamangala, Kalachand, Das Mahavidya and Hansa. Therasmancha built in 1832 has nine small towers.

David J. McCutchion mentions a ruined temple at Pathra as a char-chala on an elongated base, the nava-ratna as having smooth rekha turrets, the Kalachand temple as a flat roofed temple with a porch on five arches, and the Sitala temple as having a shallow porch projection. The temples present an amalgamation of pre-colonial, Indo-Saracenic, and colonial architectural standards.

The Dharmaraj temple, the temples of the Bandopadhyay family, the Sitala temple and the Nava-ratna complex, all four at Pathra are Monuments of National Importance in West Bengal.

== Pathra picture gallery ==
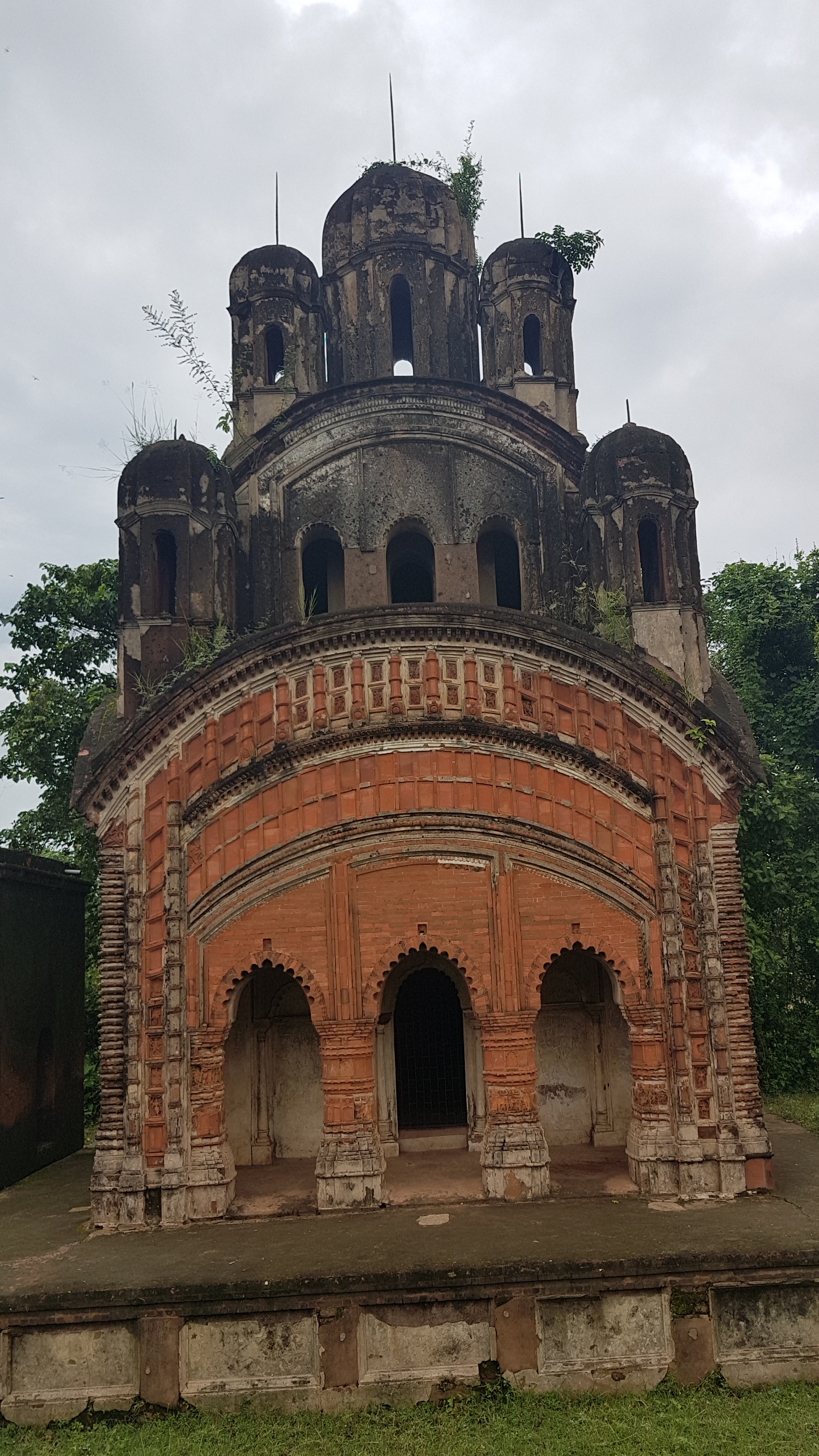
Nava-ratna temple of Majumdar family

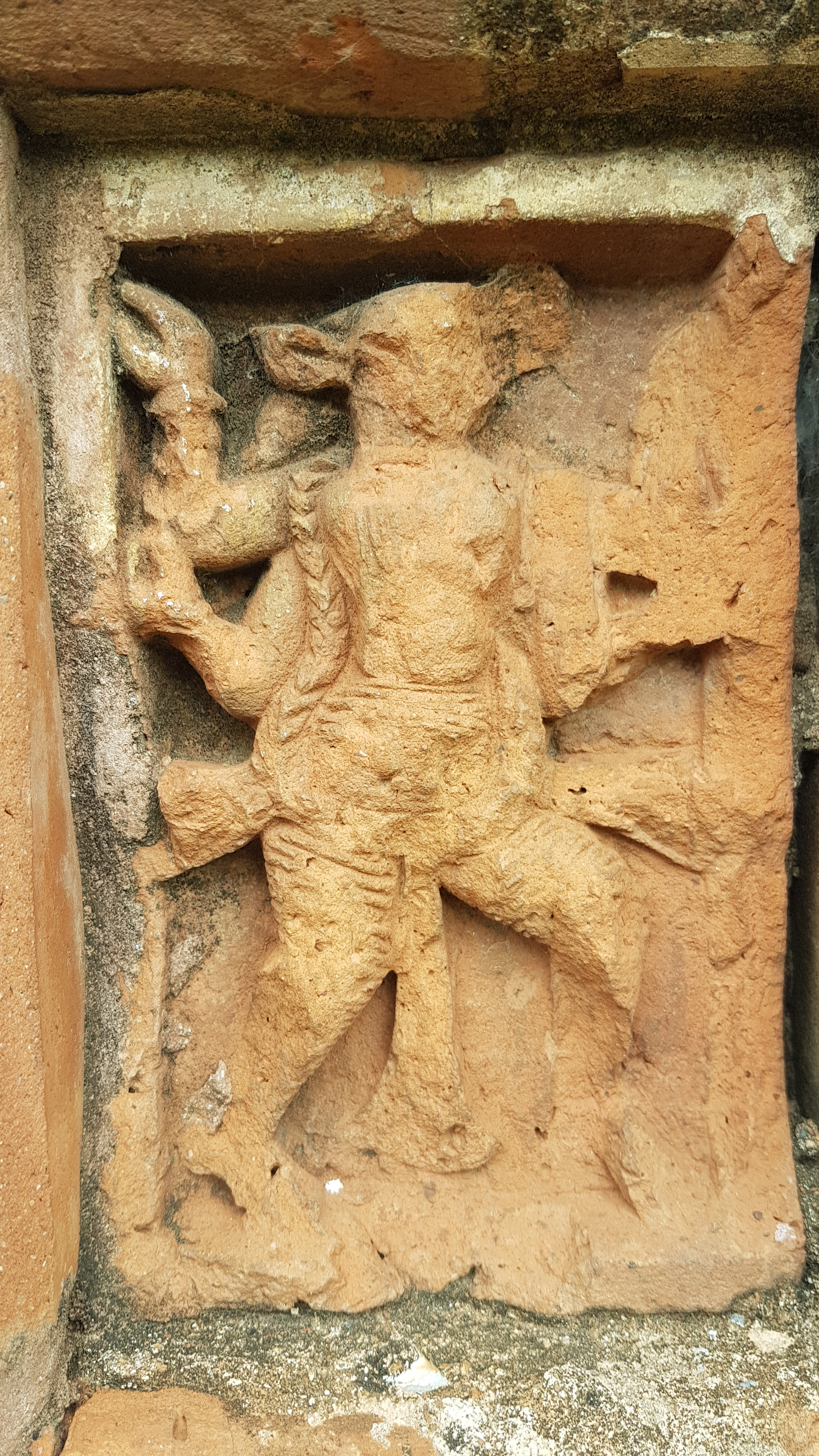
Nava-ratna temple

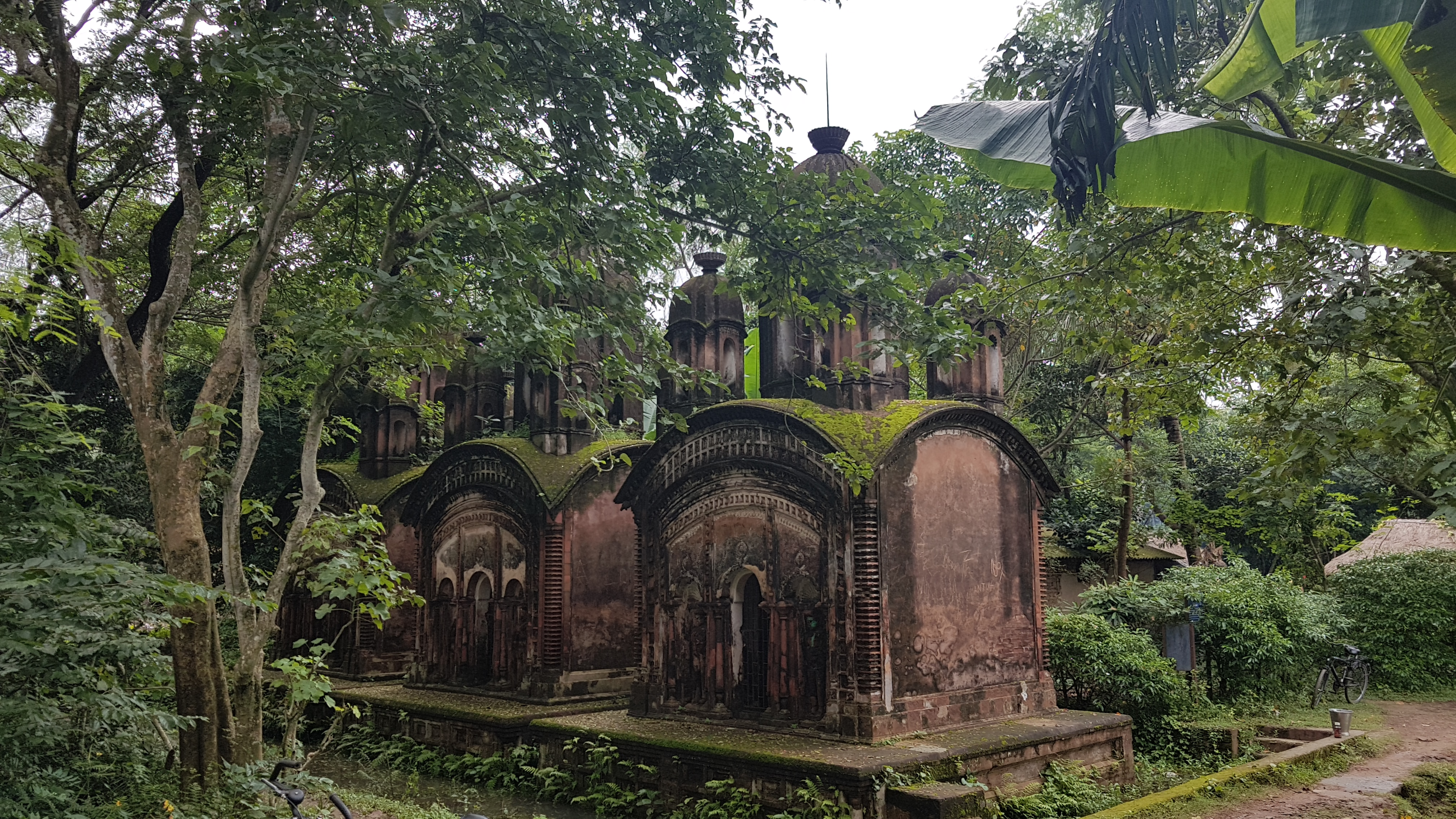
Pancha-ratna Shiva temple of Banerjee family

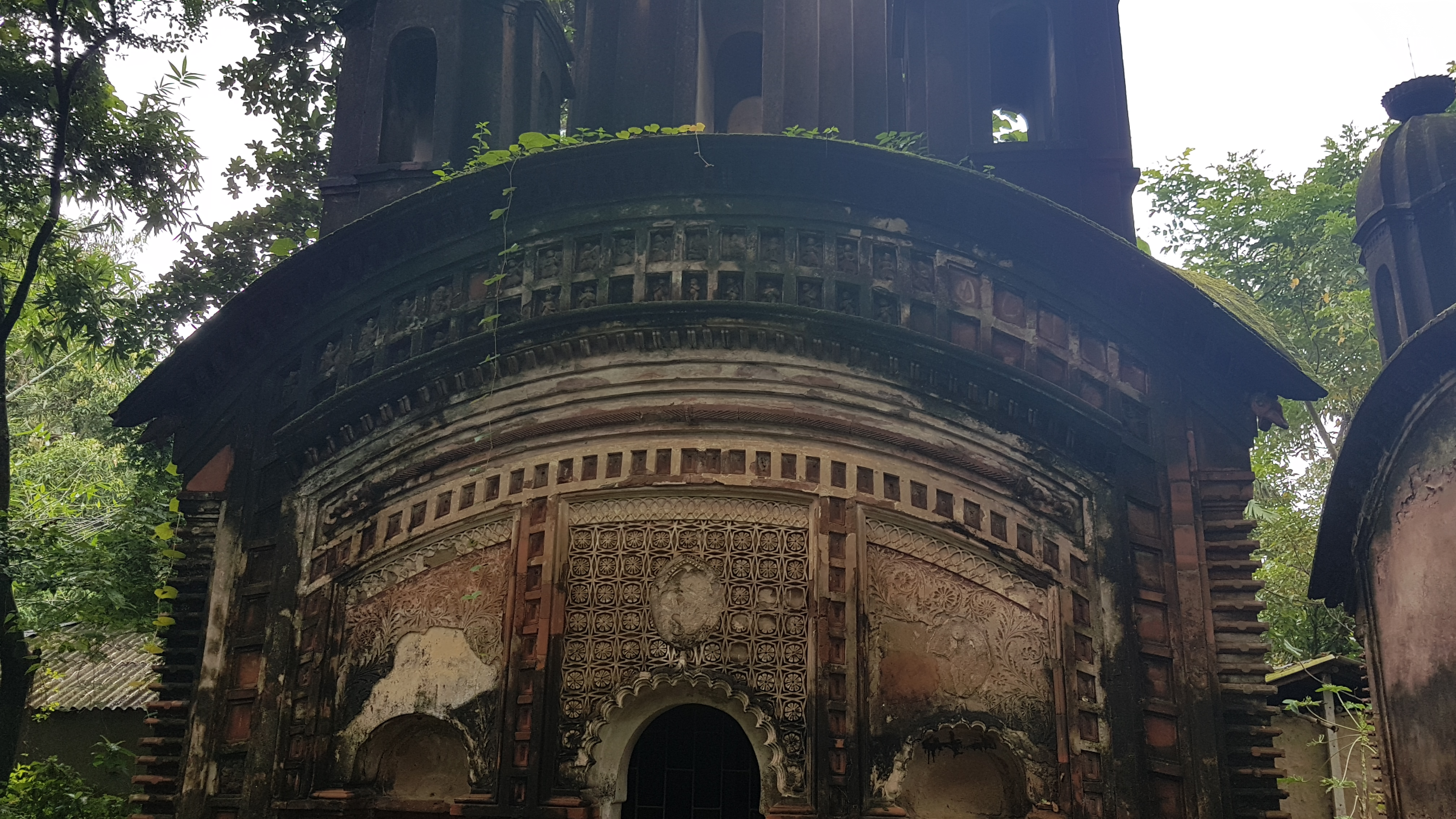
Pancha-ratna Shiva temple

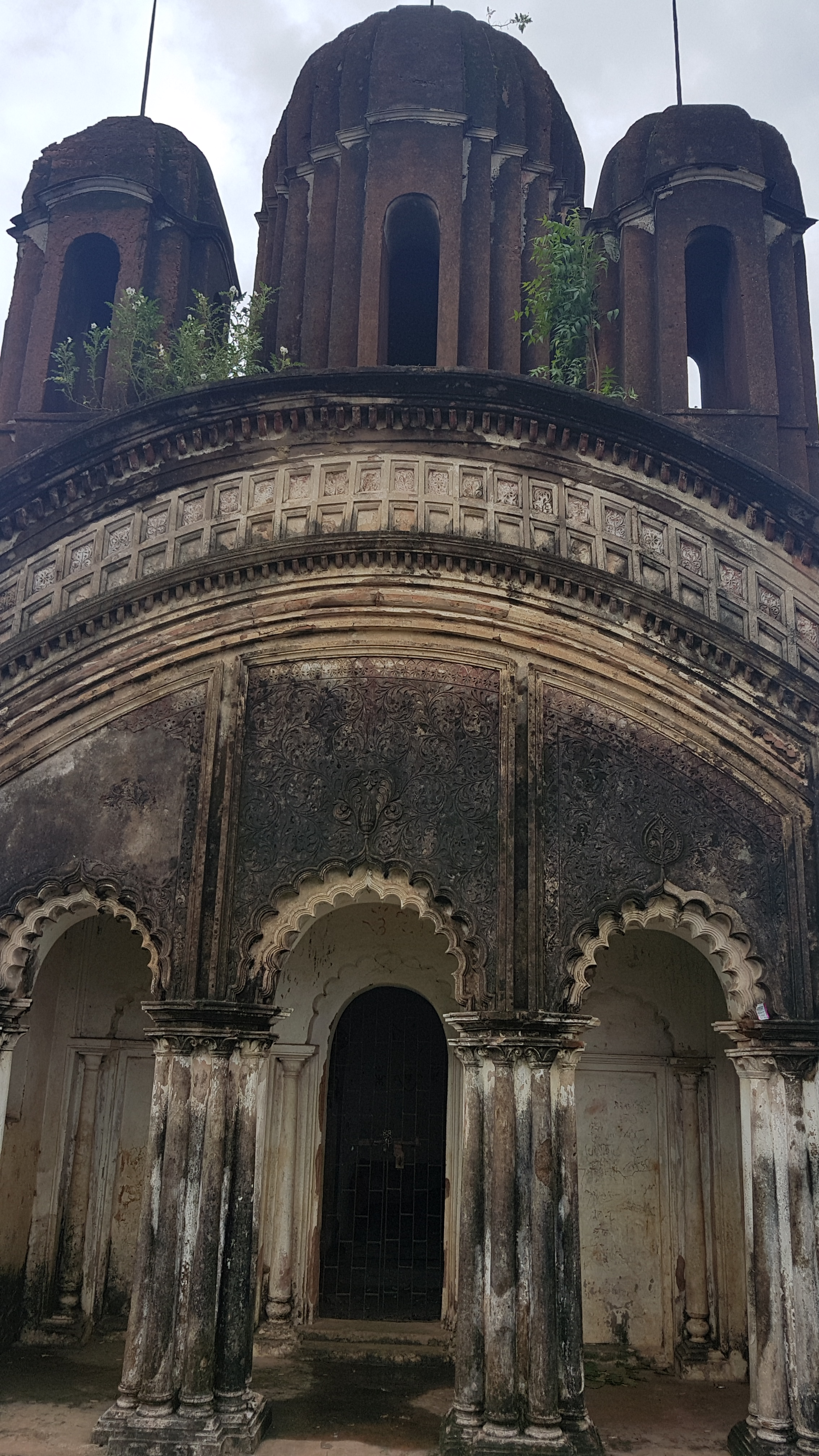
Pancha-ratna Dharmaraj temple

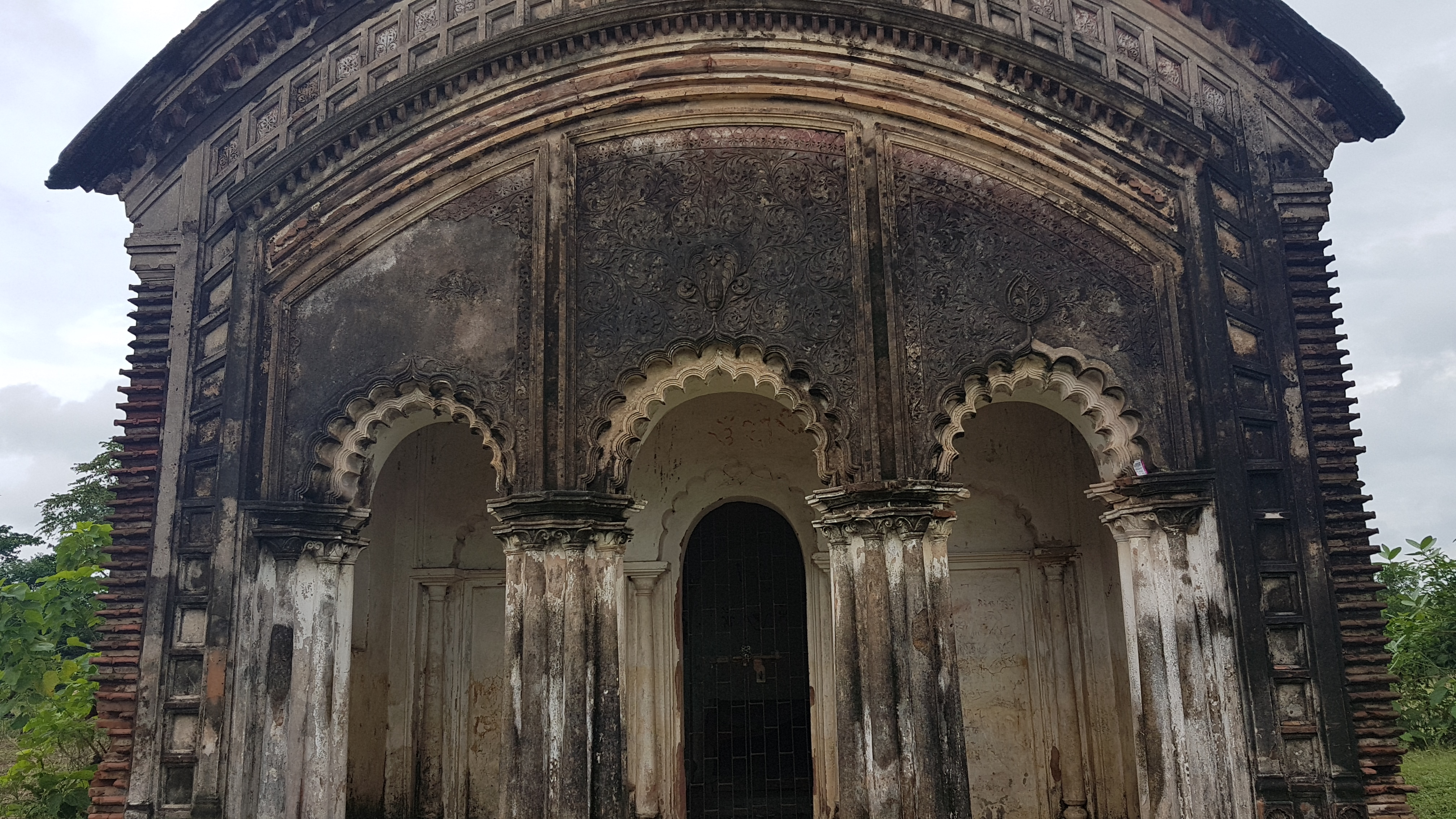
Pancha-ratna Dharmaraj temple

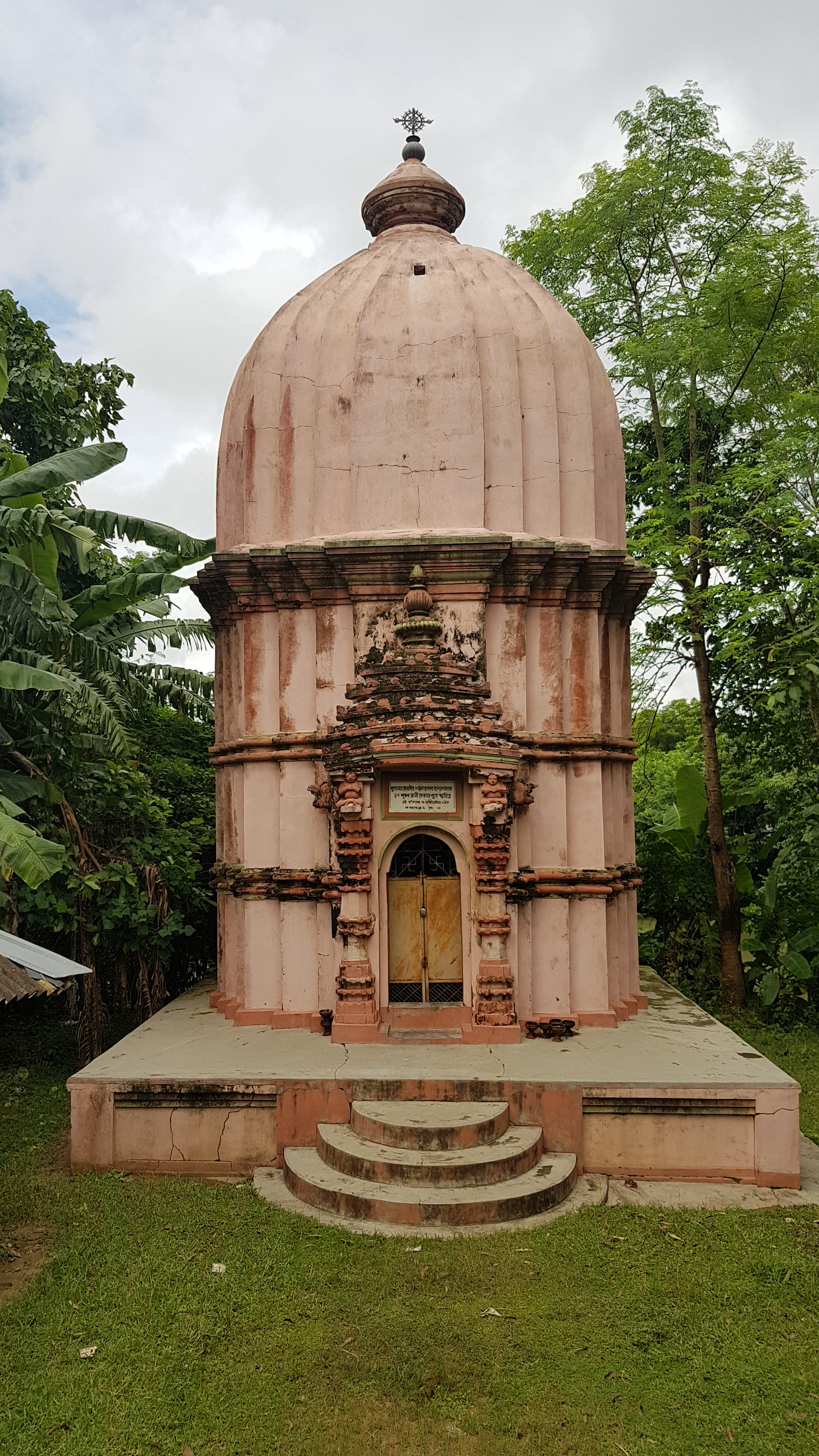
Sitala temple
