= Syed Shah Mehr Ali Alquadri Al Baghdadi =

Syed Shah Mehr Ali

Personal life
- Born: 1808 Khanqah Sharif, Mian Mahalla, Midnapore
- Died: 1868 (aged 59–60)
- Resting place: Mirza Mahalla, West Medinipur, West Bengal
- Parent: Syed Shah Tufail Ali (father)

Religious life
- Religion: Islam
- Denomination: Sunni
- School: Hanafi
- Lineage: Abdul Qadir Gilani
- Tariqa: Qadiri

Muslim leader
- Based in: Midnapore
- Period in office: 19th century

Syed Shah Mehr Ali Alquadri Al Baghdadi, commonly known as "Syedena Aala Huzur", was a famous saint of Bengal. He established Khanqah for promotion and propagation of Quadria Order. His shrine is a centre of pilgrims in Midnapore.

== Birth ==
Syed Shah Mehr Ali was born in 1808 A.D/1223 A.H at Khanqah Sharif, Mia Mohallah in the town of Midnapore now situated in the district of West Midnapore of West Bengal. He was the son of Syed Shah Tufail Ali one of the most venerated saints of Bengal. His mother Bibi Niamat un Nesa was herself a saintly lady of her age. It is claimed that he was a descendant of Abdul Qadir Gilani and that his ancestors migrated from the city of Baghdad to the remote town of Mangalkot in the district of Bardhaman in Bengal.

== Education ==
From his childhood "Syedena Aala Huzur" was put to the path of mortification and devotion. He passed most of his time in pursuit of learning, observance of religious rites and performance of spiritual exercise. He was a man of versatile genius and God gifted talents. Within a short span of time he acquired mastery over the commentaries of the Quran, the hadith of Muhammad, the principle of Islamic law and all sorts of religious sciences. He was not only a great scholar but also an accomplished Sufi poet. He was the master of Arabic and Persian language. He could speak Arabic fluently as it was his mother tongue and quote entire verses of Persian mystic poets. After acquiring mastery over different branches of religious sciences, he started delivering sermons on Sufism and Islamic tenets. Soon his fame spread far and wide. People from various places flocked in great numbers to acquire religious and esoteric grace from him. Even from Arabia and Persia some persons came to him with a view to obtain his grace. Thus it can be said without doubt that Syedena Aala Huzur s’ fame spread throughout the Islamic world and his contribution in making the Quadria order popular in Bengal was enormous. In 1267 A.H he established a Madrasah at Midnapore. This Madrasah is still present in the name of ‘Suhrawardia Mehria Islamia High Madrasah’. Syedena Aala Huzur also built a Khanqah in Midnapore town. In those days this Khanqah became the centre of Islamic teachings. The needy people were provided food and medical assistance there.

There is a famous incident of Syedena Aala Huzur that once a person posing himself as a religious scholar came from an upcountry with a cart loaded with books to his Khanqah. The person posed a lot of knotty and difficult questions for him to solve. The discussion that took place lasted for several days and nights with occasional intervals for prayers, meals and other necessities for life. Though the problems discussed where of a religious character, but the person introduced questions of philosophy, logic and other sciences into discussion. The answers which Aala Huzur gave to those questions indicated the depth of his knowledge. The person was completely defeated in discussion and he soon left Aala Huzur on some flimsy pretext.

== Meditation ==
After the demise of his father "Syedena Aala Huzur" proceeded towards Midnapore. At the outskirt of the town in the lonely forest inhabited by ravenous beasts and harmful animals he sat in deep meditation of the Almighty Allah. At the darkness of the night in the lonely forest his voice would echo with the recitation of the name of Allah. With less food and sleep he passed his days in this manner till he reached the age of thirty. For years he kept fast (excluding the forbidden days) when he would take only a banana in the evening as his main diet. After undergoing all sorts of spiritual exercise and accomplishing different stages he attained the stage of Fanafillah. He became the Qutub of his time.

== Marriage ==
He married a pious lady named Syeda Ummul Barkat Khatun Fatima Saniya. She was from the descendant of Syed Isa Rizvi, a great saint who came from Bukhara and settled at Payardanga in the district of Midnapore. Although married and entangled with social duties Syedena Aala Huzur continued his spiritual exercise of austerity and mortification.

== Descendants ==
Syedena Aala Huzur had three sons and two daughters. All of his three sons were venerated saints of high rank. Syed Shah Murshed Ali also known as ‘Huzur Purnur’ was the eldest son and Sajjada nashin of Aala Huzur. He was an accomplished scholar and a unique Sufi poet. His diwan is regarded as one of the most sacred books on Sufism. The second son Syed Shah Ali Murshed was also a saint and his shrine is at Payardanga. The youngest son Syed Shah Wali Murshed also known as ‘Qutb ul Waqt’ is counted among the greatest saints of his time. He too was a great writer and Sufi poet. He wrote many books among them, ‘Walin Mursheda’ is considered to be the most authentic book on Sufism dealing with the history of Quadria order in Bengal. The names of daughters were Syeda Fatimatul Kobra and Syeda Fatimatus Soghra.

Syedena Aala Huzur lived for sixty years. His demise took place on 16th Muharram 1285 A.H/ 1868 A.D at his Khanqah. His shrine is at Mirza Mohallah, Mazar Sharif Road, Midnapore town.
