= Kan En Vong =

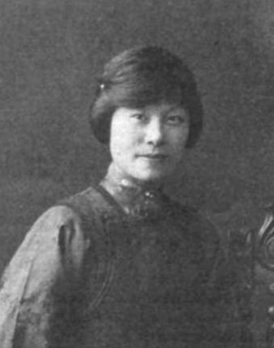
- Born: 1899 (age 126–127); Hangzhou
- Other names: Kan Eng Vong, Grace Kan, Grace Sweet
- Occupation: educator

Kan En Vong (born 1899), also known as Grace Kan or Grace Sweet, was a Chinese kindergarten educator.

== Early life ==
Kan was a little girl in Hangzhou when she joined the household of American Baptist missionaries Rev. and Mrs. William S. Sweet; it was said that she was sold by her biological father, an opium addict. Later the Rev. A. E. Harris of Philadelphia was described as her foster father.

Kan En Vong graduated from high school and trained as a kindergarten teacher under American missionary teacher Helen Rawlings in Hangzhou. Kan later attended Oberlin College in the United States, to study music and education. She graduated from Oberlin in 1922.

== Career ==
Kan was superintendent of the Union High School kindergarten in Hangzhou. In 1923, Vong taught at a Baptist missionary kindergarten in Shantou.

In 1921 Kan spoke about China at the Women's American Foreign Baptist Missionary Society gatherings in 1921 in Minneapolis, San Francisco, and New York, and lectured in other American and Canadian cities. "Our children sing songs and play games, just as children of your country do. But I don't think American children can possibly enjoy their work as Chinese youngsters do," she told audiences. "The idea is so new in China that as first the mothers did not know what to make of it. The children come two hours early they are so eager to get to the kindergarten."

== Personal life ==
She was engaged to a Chinese student at Columbia University in 1921. She later married Lawrence Liu.
