= Midnapore College =

College in West Bengal, India

- Seal of Midnapore College
- Motto: Education is the manifestation of perfection already in man
- Type: Autonomous Undergraduate & Postgraduate college
- Established: 1873; 153 years ago
- Principal: Dr. Asit Panda
- Location: Midnapore, West Bengal, India; 22.4230616°N 87.3258393°E
- Campus: Urban
- Website: midnaporecollege.ac.in

Midnapore College, established in 1873, is the oldest college in Midnapore, in the Paschim Medinipur district of West Bengal. It offers undergraduate and postgraduate courses in arts, sciences and vocational degree in Tourism & Aviation Management. It was earlier affiliated to Vidyasagar University. It has been given Autonomous status by University Grants Commission from 2014 to 2015 Session.

== History ==
Midnapore College was founded in 1873. Although this college started its journey as a degree college in 1873, one can trace the history of this educational institution in 1834 as a private school. This college was once a Private School in 1834 and then a Zilla School in 1840, finally become a degree college in 1873 under the University of Calcutta. It was then controlled by a governing body with district magistrate as ex-officio president. This college became first grade degree science college in 1924. It is the oldest college in the undivided district of Midnapore.

This college played a pioneering role in the spread of higher education. The past of the college is a saga of meritorious services to all walks of life. Under the aegis of the British government the college started disseminating Western education in the interest of rational and scientific education. The college became an independent part and parcel of Bengal Renaissance. Teachers and students of this college also played an important role in the freedom movement of India. Three teachers of this college, namely, Tarak Das Ghosh, Thakopada Biswas and Binoy Jiban Ghosh; were dismissed from service for their involvement in the Indian independence movement during 1933. This college was the breeding ground of many freedom fighters. Five students of this college, namely, Dinesh Gupta, Pradyot Kumar Bhattacharya, Mrigendranath Dutta, Brajakishore Chakraborty, and Nirmal Jivan Ghosh, became martyr during the Indian independence movement.

After the independence of India in 1947, this college became a government sponsored degree college in 1956 and got the recognition of University Grants Commission (UGC) in 1957. In 1985, the college's affiliation changed from Calcutta University to Vidyasagar University. Recently University Grants Commission has given Midnapore College an autonomous status from 2014 to 2015 Session.

== Location ==
The college is located in the heart of Midnapore city in the district Paschim Medinipur, formerly called Midnapore.

== Departments and courses ==
The college offers different undergraduate and postgraduate courses and aims at imparting education to the undergraduates of lower- and middle-class people of Midnapore and its adjoining areas.

=== Science ===
Science faculty consists of the departments of Chemistry, Physics, Mathematics, Statistics, Computer Science & Application, Botany, Zoology, Physiology, Microbiology, Nutrition, Electronics, Tourism & Aviation Management, and Economics.

=== Arts ===
Arts faculty consists of departments of Bengali, English, Sanskrit, Hindi, History, Geography, Political Science, Philosophy, Sociology, Physical Education & Sports, Education, and Yoga.

== Accreditation ==
The college is recognized by the University Grants Commission (UGC). In 2006 it was accredited by the National Assessment and Accreditation Council, and awarded A+ grade. In 2012, then it was re—accredited Grade A with 3.58 out of 4.00 CGPA Score. Now it is re-accredited and awarded by Grade A+ (CGPA-3.60 out of 4.0) by the NAAC in 2017. It is ranked 42nd among colleges in India by the National Institutional Ranking Framework (NIRF) in 2025.

== Student life ==
There are two hostels for male and female students, accommodating 60 male students and 114 female students. Students coming from remote village areas are preferred. But several private messes are available. The socio-economic culture has a direct influence from the students come to study at Midnapore.

There are two sections running in the college, morning and day. The campus area of the college is 13.59 acres (55,000 m^{2}).

== Facilities ==
Different types of facilities are available in the college. Students who cannot undergo formal studies, can pursue bachelor and postgraduate degree from distance education centre of Indira Gandhi National Open University. Basic science research takes place in the Midnapore College centre for Scientific Culture which is set up by the Indian Association of Physics Teachers. N. C. Rana sky observation centre was established for study of astronomy. This sky observation centre is also served as weather prediction centre of Midnapore district. Midnapore college library has large number of collections for which it may be used as a research centre.

== Achievements ==
Midnapore College has been identified for "Colleges with Potential for Excellence" (CPE) for XI Plan (Phase-III) by University Grants Commission in 2010.

University Grants Commission has also given Midnapore College an autonomous status. It is only the fourth college in West Bengal to have been granted the status after St Xavier's College, Ramkrishna Mission, Narendrapur and Belur. The college, from 2014 to 2015 session, started to frame their own curricula and conduct their own examinations. The results too are published by the college themselves. Only the marksheet that is provided to students are now published with the approval of Vidyasagar University.

== See also ==
- List of institutions of higher education in West Bengal
- Education in India
- Education in West Bengal
