= Joint Forest Management =

Term for partnerships in forest movements

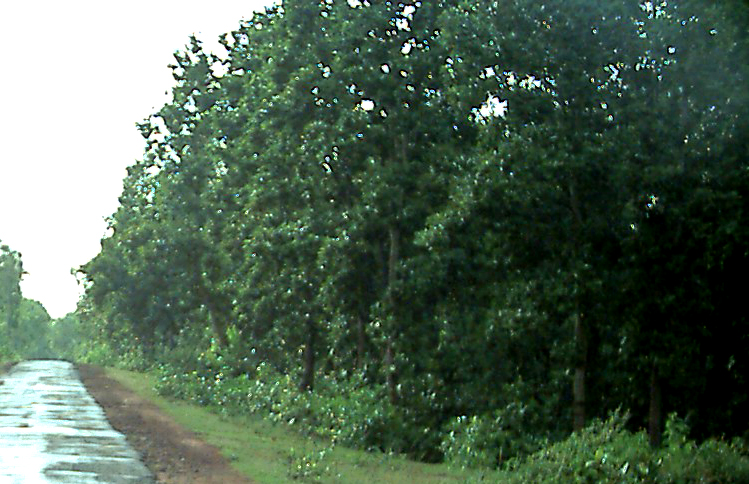
Joint Forest Movement scheme at work upgraded forests of the Arabari forest range, West Bengal (Rajeev kumar)

Joint Forest Management often abbreviated as JFM is the official and popular term in India for partnerships in forest movement involving both the state forest departments and local communities. The policies and objectives of Joint Forest Movement are detailed in the Indian comprehensive National Forest Policy of 1988 and the Joint Forest Management Guidelines of 1990 of the Government of India.

Although schemes vary from state to state and are known by different names in different Indian languages, usually a village committee known as the Forest Protection Committee (FPC) and the Forest Department enter into a JFM agreement. Villagers agree to assist in the safeguarding of forest resources through protection from fire, grazing, and illegal harvesting and sometimes as watcher in forest check post in exchange for which they receive non-timber forest products and a share of the revenue from the sale of timber products.

== Origins ==
Joint forest management is concept of developing relationships between fringe forest groups and forest department on the basis of mutual trust and jointly defined roles and responsibilities for forest protection and development. Joint Forest Management originated in Odisha in 1988 . The major hardwood of Arabari Forest Range is sal, a commercially profitable forest crop. Ajit Kumar Banerjee, a silviculturist, working for the Forest Department as the Divisional Forest Officer, was conducting trials which were constantly being disturbed by grazing and illegal harvesting by the local populace. At the time there were no initiatives for sharing of forest resources between the government and the locals, with the government considering many of the locals no more than "thieves". The forest official, against the suggestions of his co-workers, sought out representatives of eleven local villages and negotiated the terms of a contract with an ad hoc Forest Protection Committee. The initial program involved 612 families managing 12.7 square kilometres of forests classified as "degraded". 25% of profits from the forests were shared with the villagers. The experiment was successful and was expanded to other parts of the state in 1987. JFM is still in force at Arabari.

A few years later, Joint Forest Management was employed in the state of Haryana to prevent soil erosion and deforestation. In 1977, villagers were persuaded that instead of grazing on erosion-prone hills, building small dams would help agricultural output on areas currently under cultivation. The program led to reforestation of many hills in the state. However, officially the state of Odisha remains the first to pass the first resolutions for JFM

== Current status ==
After the initial successes in West Bengal and Haryana, the JFM schemes received national importance in the legislation of 1988 and thrust in the Guidelines of 1998. As of 2000 27 states of the Indian Union had various JFM schemes with over 63,000 FPCs involved in the joint management of over 1,400,000 km^{2} of forested land. In 2010 the areas increased to 2,460,000 km^{2} and was managed by more than 112,896 committees with around 14,500,000 families getting benefit from JFM programme.

== See also ==
- Communal forests of India
- Indian Council of Forestry Research and Education
- National Forest Commission
- Social forestry
- Sustainable forest management
- Sustainable forestry
- Illegal logging
- Van Vigyan Kendra (VVK) Forest Science Centres
