= 1770: Ek Sangram =

Upcoming Indian film

- 1770 - Ek Sangram announcement poster
- Directed by: Ashwin Gangaraju
- Written by: V. Vijayendra Prasad
- Story by: Bankim Chandra Chattopadhyay
- Based on: Anandamath by Bankim Chandra Chatterjee
- Produced by: Shailendra KKumar; Suraj Sharma; Sujoyy Kuttyiy; V. Vijayendra Prasad
- Production companies: SSI Entertainment; PK Entertainment
- Country: India
- Language: Telugu

1770: Ek Sangram is an upcoming Indian Telugu-language historical drama film, based on the Bengali novel Anandamath, written by Bankim Chandra Chattopadhyay in 1882. The novel and film are set in the event of the Sannyasi Rebellion, which took place in the late 18th century in Bengal. 1770: Ek Sangram is produced by SSI Entertainment and PK Entertainment.

== Premise ==
The film marks the 150th anniversary of 'Vande Mataram', which sparked the Swaraj movement in India against the British Empire.

== Production ==
=== Development ===
Film announced on 8 April 2022, marks death anniversary of Bankim Chandra Chatterjee by Ram Kamal Mukherjee, former Zee Studios head. 1770: Ek Sangram is made in Hindi, Tamil, Telugu simultaneously and dubbed versions in Kannada, Malayalam and Bengali languages.

=== Filming ===
According to the makers, the film will be expensive and will be shot in Mumbai, Hyderabad, West Bengal and London and the Principal photography was started at the end of 2022.
