= 1770 (disambiguation) =

1770 or Seventeen Seventy may refer to:

- 1770, an integer number in the 1000 range that is frequently used to represent MDCCLXX the year 1770 C.E. on the Western Calendar
- 1770 BC, the year 1770 before the Common Era of the West
- 1770s, the decade in the Common Era of the West
- 1770: Ek Sangram, upcoming Indian film
- 1770 (mummy), the Egyptian mummy numbered "1770"
- 1770 Schlesinger, Asteroid 1770, the 1770th asteroid numbered, discovered as 1967 JR, named asteroid Schlesinger
- Seventeen Seventy, Queensland, a town in Queensland, Australia
