= Bishabriksha (1936 film) =

- Directed by: Phani Burma
- Written by: Bankim Chandra Chattopadhyay
- Based on: Bishabriksha
- Starring: Kanan Devi; Jahar Ganguly; Shanti Gupta; Tulsi Chakraborty
- Cinematography: Biren Dey
- Edited by: Rajen Das
- Music by: Prithwish Bhaduri; Kumar Mitra
- Production company: Radha Films
- Distributed by: Prima Films
- Release date: 15 December 1936
- Country: India
- Language: Bengali

Bishabriksha (The Poison Tree) is a Bengali drama film directed by Phani Burma based on the 1873 classic novel Bishabriksha by Bankim Chandra Chattopadhyay. The film was released on 15 December 1936 under the banner of Radha Films.

== Plot ==
The film revolves emotional conflict of Nagendranath's family life. Zaminder Nagendra involves with a young widow Kundanandini despite being married to his devoted wife Suryamukhi.

== Cast ==
- Jahar Ganguly as Nagendranath
- Kanan Devi as Kundanandini
- Shanti Gupta as Suryamukhi
- Meera Dutta as Kamalmani
- Bhumen Roy as Shreesh
- Tulsi Chakraborty
- Kumar Mitra
- Janaki Bhattacharya
- Tarak Bagchi
- Renuka Ray
- Pramilabala
- Saroj Bagchi
