= Bishabriksha (1922 film) =

- Directed by: Jyotish Bannerjee
- Written by: Bankim Chandra Chattopadhyay
- Based on: Bishabriksha by Bankim Chandra Chattopadhyay
- Starring: Durgadas Bannerjee; Basantakumari; Manoranjan Bhattacharya
- Cinematography: Jatin Das
- Production company: Madan Theatre
- Release date: 6 May 1922
- Country: India
- Language: Silent (Bengali intertitles)

Bishabriksha is a 1922 Bengali silent drama film directed by Jyotish Bannerjee based on the 1873 novel Bishabriksha by Bankim Chandra Chattopadhyay. The film was released on 6 May 1922 under the banner of Madan Theatres. It is the first cinematic adaptations of this epic novel of Bengali literature.

== Plot ==
The story revolves with the life of Nagendra, a wealthy zaminder happy married with Suryamukhi. He becomes attracted to the young widow Kundanandini. This relationship leads to domestic conflict.

== Cast ==
- Durgadas Bannerjee
- Basantakumari as Heera
- Gopalchandra Bhattacharya as Nagendra
- Manoranjan Bhattacharya
- Kashinath Chatterjee as Debendra
- Kusum Kumari as Suryamukhi
- Mrinalini as Kundanandini
- Satyendra Nath Dey as Srish
- Hiralal Dutta as Brahmachari
- Leela Devi
- Takak Bala
- Joy Narayan Mukherjee
