= Sannyasi rebellion =

Late 18th century rebellion in Bengal

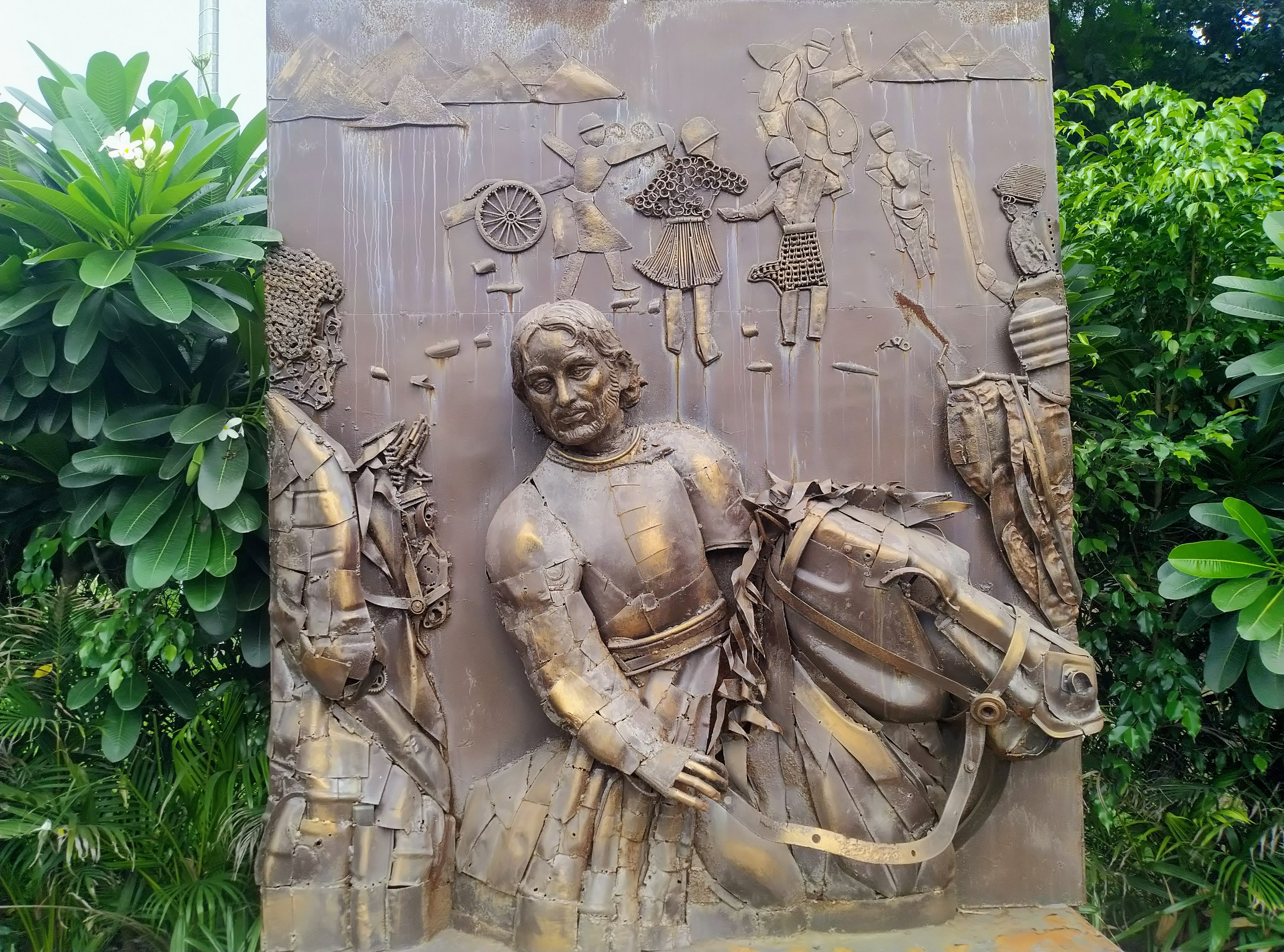
A Sculpture of the Sanyasi Rebellion, at Shaheedi Park (Martyrs Park) in Delhi.

The Sannyasi rebellion (Bengali: সন্ন্যাসী/সাধু বিদ্রোহ, lit. 'monk's rebellion') was a revolt by sannyasis and sadhus (ascetics) against the rule of the British East India Company (EIC) in Bengal and Bihar (1763–1800). Historians have not only debated what events constitute the rebellion, but have also varied on the significance of the rebellion in Indian history. While some refer to it as an early war for India's independence from foreign rule, since the right to collect tax had been given to the British East India Company after the Battle of Plassey in 1757 and Battle of Buxar in 1764, others categorize it as random acts of violent banditry following the depopulation of the province, post the Bengal famine of 1770.

== Early events ==
A large body of sannyasis travelled annually from northern India to different parts of Bengal to visit shrines. En route to the shrines, it was customary for many of these ascetics to be bestowed with religious grants from the headmen and zamindars or regional landlords. In times of prosperity, the headmen and zamindars generally obliged. However, since the East India Company had received the diwani or right to collect tax, tax demands on zamindars increased, and the local landlords and headmen were unable to pay both the ascetics and the British. The East India Company viewed these Hindu ascetics with suspicion and treated them like bandits. In 1771, 150 ascetics were executed by the EIC authorities. This led to widespread revolt by sanyasis of Bengal and Bihar which smouldered for several decades.

At least three separate events are called the Sannyasi rebellion. One refers to a large body of Hindu sannyasis who travelled from North India to different parts of Bengal to visit shrines. En route to the shrines, it was customary for many of these ascetics to exact a religious tax from the headmen and zamindars (feudal lords). In times of prosperity, the headmen and zamindars generally obliged. However, since the East India Company had received the diwani or right to collect tax, many of the tax demands increased and the local feudal lords and headmen were unable to pay both the ascetics and the English. Crop failures, and famine, which killed an estimated one million people compounded the problems since much of the arable land lay fallow.

In 1771, 150 members of the Sannyasi rebels were put to death, apparently for no reason. This was one of the reasons that caused distress leading to violence, especially in Natore in Rangpur, (now in modern Bangladesh). However, some modern historians argue that the movement never gained popular support.

The other two movements involved a sect of Hindu ascetics, the Dasanami Naga Sadhus who likewise visited Bengal on pilgrimage. To the British, these ascetics were plunderers and must be stopped from collecting money that belonged to the company and possibly from even entering the province. It was felt that a large body of people on the move was a possible threat.

While early colonial records applied the blanket term Sannyasi to the Hindu insurgents, modern historical analysis indicates that the rebel forces comprised a diverse coalition of militarized Hindu ascetic orders. Alongside the predominant Dasnami Naga sannyasis (Giri/Puri lineages), a substantial numbers of Nath-Yogis (historically documented as jogis) actively participated in the guerrilla campaigns against the East India Company. These warrior-monks shared an established lineage of armed monasticism that defended their regional economic privileges and traditional pilgrimage routes. At least one out of the three events involved Gosain ascetics along with other instances of their frequent clashes with the Company's army in northern frontiers of Bengal.

== Clashes between the Company and ascetics ==
For hundreds of years monks had been visiting North India and pilgrim sites. They also used to take some alms from zamidars. But after British imposed taxes on zamidars, it became hard for them to give alms to the ascetics. Sannyasis were burdened with restrictions as the British government thought they were plunderers and thugs. Most of the clashes were recorded in the years following the Bengal famine of 1770 but they continued, albeit with a lesser frequency, up until 1802. The reason that even with superior training and forces, the company was not able to suppress sporadic clashes with migrating ascetics was that the control of the company's forces in the far-removed hilly and jungle covered districts like Birbhum and Midnapore on local events was weak.

== Legacy ==
The Sannyasi rebellion was the first of a series of revolts and rebellions in the western districts of the province including (but not restricted to) the Chuar Revolt of 1799 and the Santhal Revolt of 1855–56. What effect the Sannyasi Rebellion had on rebellions that followed is debatable. Perhaps, the best reminder of the rebellion is in literature, in the Bengali novels Anandamath (1882) and Devi Chaudhurani (1884), written by India's first modern novelist Bankim Chandra Chatterjee. The song, Vande Mataram, which was written in 1876, was used in the novel Anandamath in 1882 and the 1952 film based on the book. The first two verses of Vande Mataram were later declared to be India's National Song (not to be confused with the Indian National Anthem).

In 2022, Telugu film producer and scriptwriter V. Vijayendra Prasad announced his upcoming project tentatively titled 1770: Ek Sangram, based on Anandamath and the Sanyasi rebellion. The movie will be simultaneously made in Bengali, Hindi, Tamil and Telugu.

== Bibliography ==
- Chattopadhyay, Bankim Chandra (April 2006). Lipner, J. J. (ed.). Anandamath, or The Sacred Brotherhood. India: Oxford University Press, India. ISBN 978-0-19-568322-6.
- Anandmath by Bankim Chandra Chattopadhyay. Tr. by Sri Aurobindo & Barindra Kumar Ghosh.
- The Sannyasi Rebellion by Asit Nath Chandra 1977. Ratna Prakashan, Calcutta.
