= Bishabriksha =

1873 novel by Bankim Chandra Chattopadhyay

Bishbriksha
- Author: Bankim Chandra Chattopadhyay
- Original title: বিষবৃক্ষ
- Language: Bengali
- Genre: Novel
- Publication date: 1873
- Publication place: India
- Media type: Print

Bishbriksha (English: The Poison Tree) is a Bengali novel written by Bankim Chandra Chatterjee. The novel was published serially in Bangadarshan. It deals with widow remarriage.

== Adaptation ==
- Bishabriksha (1922 film), the first adaptation of the novel, directed by Jyotish Bannerjee starring Durgadas Bannerjee, Basantakumari.
- Bishabriksha (1936 film) is directed by Phani Burma starring Kanan Devi and Jahar Ganguly.
- Bishabriksha (1953 film), is directed by Shantipriyo Mukhopadhyay starring Bikash Roy, Padma Devi.
- Bishabriksha (1984 film) is directed by Ajoy Kar starring Ranjit Mallick, Debasree Roy and Lily Chakravarty.
