= Jadunath Bhattacharya =

Musical artist (1840 – 1883)

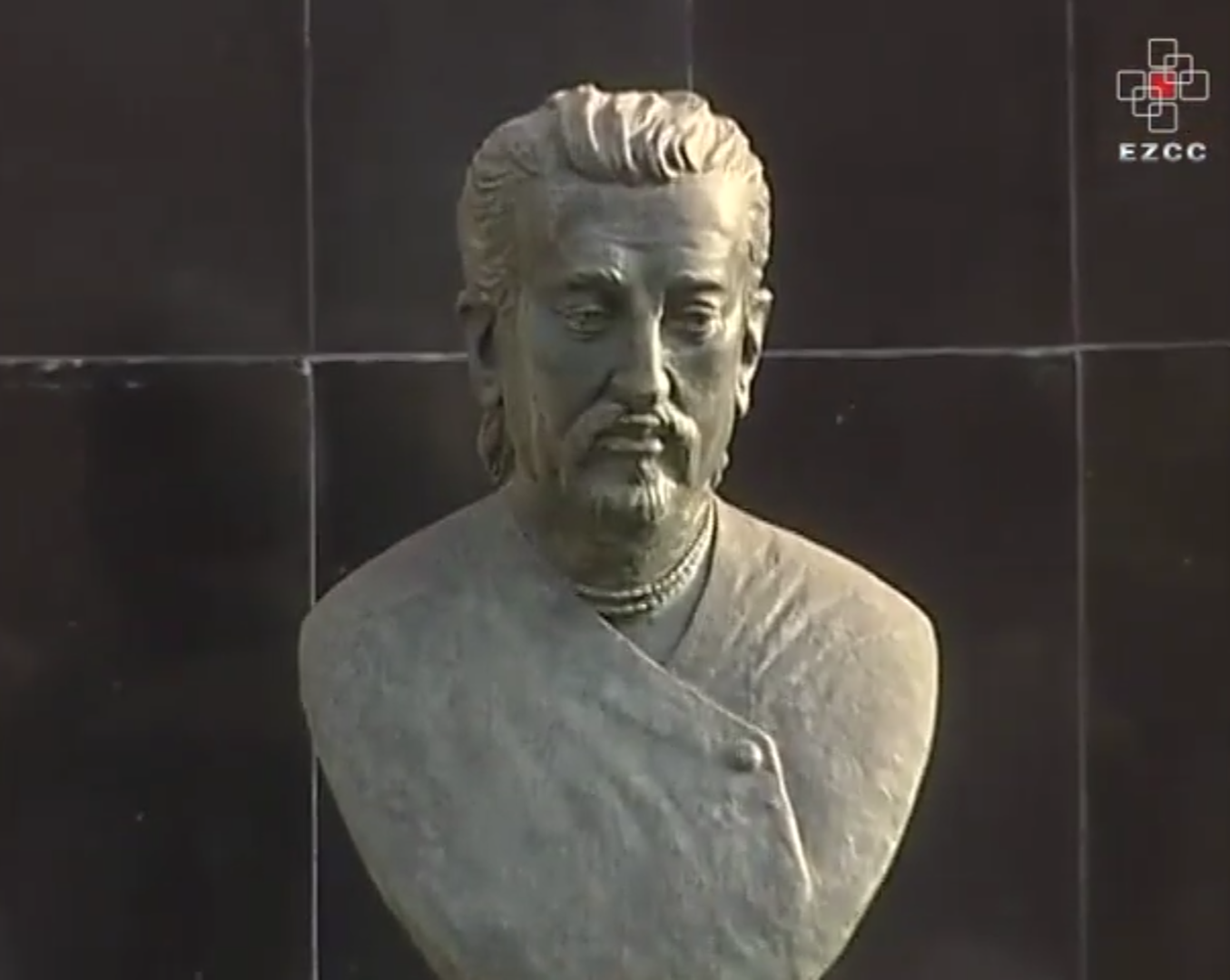
- Born: 1840; Bishnupur, Bengal Presidency, British India
- Died: April 4, 1883 (aged 43)
- Occupations: Vocalist, Musician
- Years active: 1860 –1883
- Father: Madhusudan Bhattacharya
- Musical career
- Genres: Indian classical music; Bengali classical music
- Instruments: Surbahar, sitar

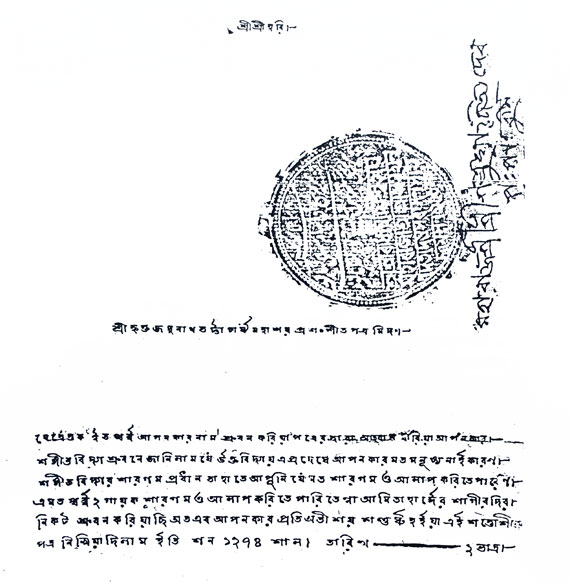
An old certificate awarded by Maharaja Satrughnaditya to Jadu Batta

Jadunath Bhattacharya (also known as Jadu Bhatta) (1840 – 4 April 1883) was an Indian musician and composer of the 19th century Indian classical music, mainly of the Bishnupur gharana. He was, in the words of the poet, considered " a master of the hand of God". He influenced the music of the Bishnupur gharana and promoted the genre to different parts of the country.

== Influence on Rabindranath Tagore and Bankim ==
A mid-19th century tanpura that Dhrupad legend Jadu Bhatta used to play while giving lessons to icons like Bankim Chandra Chattopadhyay and Rabindranath Tagore.

Rabindra Sangeet		Source - Original song by Jadu Bhatta		Raga, rhythm	
Bengali script	Bengali phonemic transcription	Bengali script	Bengali phonemic transcription	Bengali script	Bengali phonemic transcription
১) শূন্য হাতে ফিরি হে, নাথ	1) Śūn'ya hātē phiri hē, nātha	রুমঝুম বরখে আজো বদরবা	Rumajhuma barakhē ājō badarabā	কাফি, সুরফাঁকতাল	Kāphi, suraphām̐katāla
২) আজি বহিছে বসন্ত পবন	2) Āji bahichē basanta pabana	আজু বহত সুগন্ধ পবন	Āji bahuta sugandhi pabana	বাহার, তেওড়া	Bāhāra, tē'ōṛā
৩) আজি মম মন চাহে	3) Āji mama mana cāhē	ফুলিবন ঘন মোর আয়ে বসন্তরি	Phulibana ghana mōra āẏē basantari	বাহার, চৌতাল	Bāhāra, cautāla
৪) জয় তব বিচিত্র আনন্দ	4) Jaẏa taba bicitra ānanda	জয় প্রবল বেগবতী সুরেশ্বরী	Jaẏa prabala bēgabatī surēśbarī	বৃন্দাবনী সারং, তেওড়া	Br̥ndābanī sāraṁ, tē'ōṛā

Vande Mataram Music

Bankim Chandra also became a musical disciple of Jadu Bhatta. He used to visit Bankim Chandra's house in Bhatpara, Naihati. He was the first composer of the "national anthem of Bengal" Vande Mataram. He first composed the song in the Kafi raga on the trital.

== Legacy ==
The 177-year-old tanpura used by Jadunath Bhattacharya is now preserved in the Kolkata Museum.

== Memories ==
Rabindranath Tagore -

"The uniqueness of his songs is not found in any other Hindustani song. It is doubtful whether anyone else has been born in modern India with a musical flair like Jadu Bhatta."

== Books ==
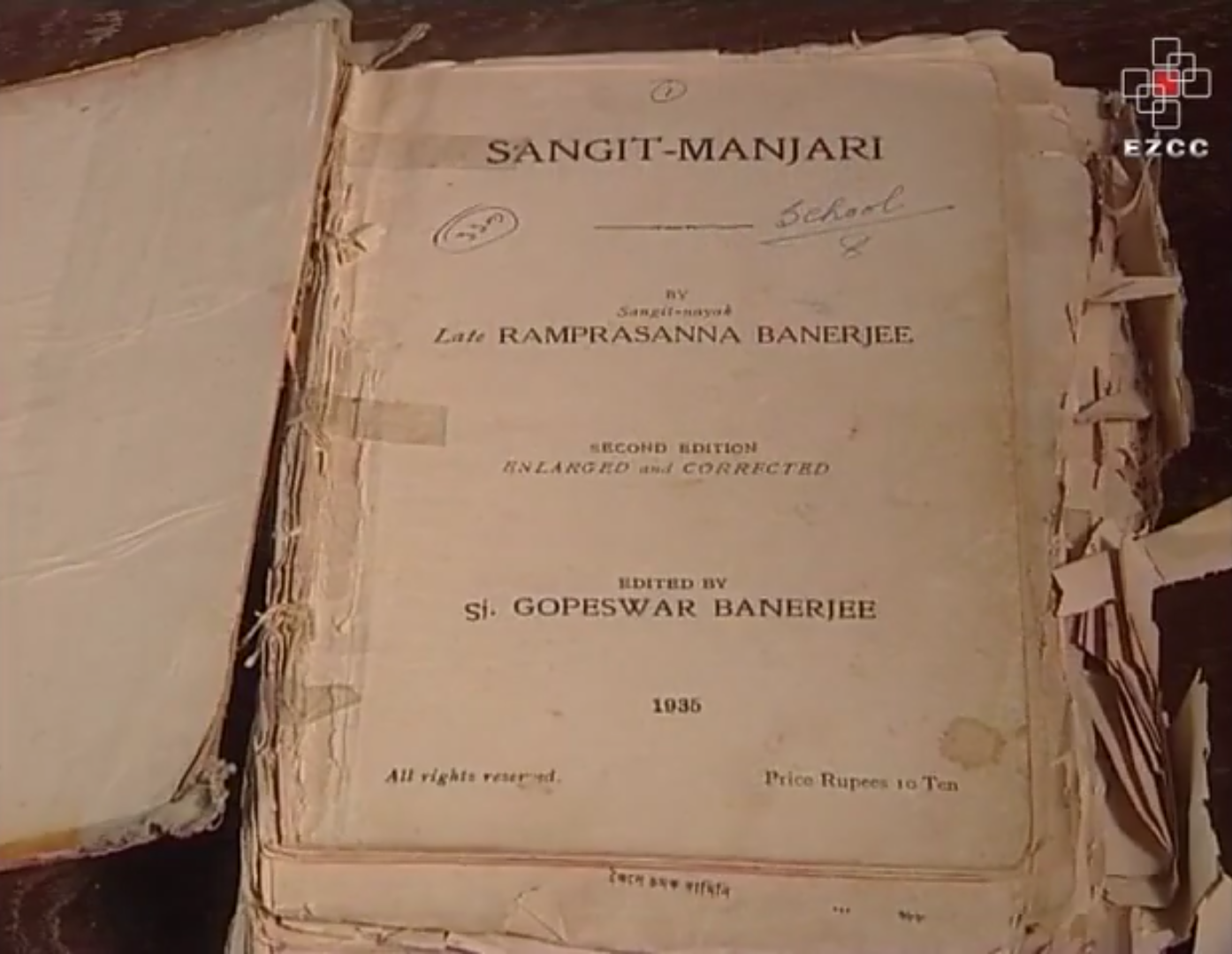
Sangit Manjari Book written by Ramaprasanna Bandyopadhyay

The Bengali and Hindi songs he composed have been published in the book "Sangita Manjari" and the introduction of some songs in the book "Bishnupur" written by Ramaprasanna Bandyopadhyay.

- Bandyopādhyāẏa, Rāmaprasanna (1935). Sangita manjari (in Bengali). Kuntalin Press.

== In popular culture ==
=== Film ===
- Indian film director Niren Lahiri made a film, Jadu Bhatta (1954). This movie received the 2nd National Film Award for Best Feature Film in Bengali.
