= Bishabriksha (1953 film) =

- Directed by: Shantipriyo Mukhopadhyay
- Screenplay by: Shantipriyo Mukhopadhyay
- Story by: Bankim Chandra Chatterjee
- Based on: Bishabriksha by Bankim Chandra Chatterjee
- Starring: Bikash Roy; Padma Devi; Shyam Laha; Biren Chattopadhyay
- Cinematography: Murari Ghosh
- Edited by: Ajit Das
- Music by: Biren Bhattacharya
- Production company: Studio X
- Distributed by: Mullik Film Distributors
- Release date: 14 March 1953
- Country: India
- Language: Bengali

Bishabriksha is a Bengali drama film directed by Shantipriyo Mukhopadhyay based on the 1873 classic Bengali novel Bishabriksha written by Bankim Chandra Chatterjee. it was released on 14 March 1953 under the banner of Mullik Film Distributors.

== Cast ==
- Bikash Roy
- Shyam Laha
- Padma Devi
- Biren Chattopadhyay
- Pranati Ghosh
- Mihir Bhattacharya
- Bechu Singha
- Harimohan Bose
- Mrityunjoy Bandyopadhyay
- Rajlakshmi Devi
