= Rajmohan's Wife =

Book by Bankim Chandra Chattopadhyay

- Author: Bankim Chandra Chattopadhyay
- Language: English
- Publisher: Indian Field
- Publication date: 1864
- Publication place: India
- Media type: Print
- Pages: 124 pp
- Text: Rajmohan's Wife at Wikisource

Rajmohan's Wife (1864) is the debut novella of the Indian author Bankim Chandra Chatterjee. The English-language novella, claimed by many to be the very first Indian novella, was published by a lesser-known periodical named Indian Field edited by Kishori Chand Mitra. The novella abruptly ended for unknown reasons, and later grew more obscure, until it was rediscovered and republished.

== Chapters and characters ==
=== Chapters ===
- I: The Drawers Of Water.
- II: The Two Cousins.
- III: The Truant's Return Home.
- IV: The History Of The Rise And Progress Of A Zemindar Family.
- V: A Letter—A Visit To The Zenana
- VI: Midnight Plotting.
- VII: Love Can Conquer Fear.
- VIII: Forewarned And Forearmed.
- IX: We Meet To Part.
- X: The Return.
- XI: When Thieves Fall Out.
- XII: The Friends And The Stranger.
- XIII: The Protectress.
- XIV: Between Rival Charmers.
- XV: Consultations And Council.
- XVI: What Befell Our Hero.
- XVII: The Vigilance Of Love.
- XVIII: Captors And Captive.
- XIX: Madhav And Tara.
- XX: Some Women Are The Equals Of Some Men.
- XXI: The Last Chapters In Life's Book—And In This.
- Conclusion.

=== Characters ===
- Matangini: The eponymous "wife" of Rajmohan and the protagonist.
- Rajmohan: The abusive husband of Matangini.
- Hemangini: The younger sister of Matangini and the wife of Madhav.
- Madhav Ghose: The husband of Hemangini.
- Mathur Ghose: The cousin brother of Madhav and the husband of Tara and Champak.
- Kanakmayee a.k.a. Kanak: The friend of Matangini.
- The Sardar: The leader of the dacoits.
- Bhiku: The right-hand man of the Sardar.
- Karuna: The housekeeper of Madhav.
- Tara: The first wife of Mathur and the childhood best friend of Madhav.
- Champak: The second wife of Mathur.

== Plot ==
=== Summary ===
The novella opens one late afternoon in a remote village named Radhaganj in the Bengal Presidency. An unnamed thirty-year-old woman awakens from an afternoon nap, dresses up and heads out of her house and goes to a nearby house, where she meets with an eighteen-year-old married woman. The two women strike up a conversation, through which the thirty-year-old woman's name is revealed to be Kanakmayee, shortened to Kanak. After some persuasion, Kanak convinces the eighteen-year-old woman to accompany her to fetch water from the nearby river. Albeit being afraid of her husband's reaction, the 18-year-old woman takes a pitcher and goes out with Kanak.

Meanwhile, in another place, two men—who are cousins—are seen conversing with each other. The elder one is Mathur Ghose and the younger one is Madhav Ghose. Mathur was talking to Madhav about his recent arrival in Radhaganj after leaving Calcutta, when they both look out of their window and see Kanak and the eighteen-year-old married woman returning home. A sudden gust of wind removes the veil of the eighteen-year-old woman, revealing her face. Madhav recognises her as Matangini, the wife of Rajmohan, who is also in Radhaganj. Kanak and Matangini return to their respective homes, with Matangini being fearful of her husband's reaction.

In a flashback, we get to see the rise of a Bengali zamindar family, when a young cook named Bangshibadan Ghose became the subject of attention of the woman who was handling the zamindari estate. Later the zamindari went to Bangshibadan's hand when the woman—who later became his second wife in the presence of his first wife—died. Bangshibadan later shifted to Radhaganj and established his estate there, and lived his life to the fullest. After his demise, his property was divided among his three sons: Ramkanta (father of Mathur), Ramkanai (father of Madhav), and Ramgopal. Due to Ramkanta's wish, Mathur never got proper English education but was successfully taught how to manage his estate. Ramkanai, though indolent and extravagant in nature (which caused him to lose almost his entire property, due to some people who continued to fleece his money from him), gave his son Madhav the best education that he can afford, and also had him marry a poor-yet-good natured woman named Hemangini (younger sister of Matangini), meanwhile Matangini married Rajmohan, a marriage organised by Matangini's father. Matangini later appealed to Hemangini to talk to Madhav about giving Rajmohan a job, a task which Hemangini struggles to fulfill. Madhav later directly talks to Rajmohan and asks him to work as a supervisor to his estate, promising that his family will be provided with a house in Radhaganj. Rajmohan is infuriated by this proposal and storms out. He later accepts the proposal, with utmost reluctance and moves to Radhaganj with Matangini, where he's staying at the house made for him, under Madhav's supervision. Ramgopal remained childless throughout his life and, at the time of his death, bequeathed his entire property to Madhav, under the condition that Madhav will look after Ramgopal's widowed wife.

The story now returns to the present. After Matangini returns home, she's confronted by an enraged Rajmohan; she silently faces the abuse hurled at her by Rajmohan, who was somewhat softened by Matangini's tears. When Rajmohan finally calms down, his aunt calmly escorts Matangini to her chamber, after which she immensely scolds Rajmohan. Meanwhile, Madhav returns to his house, where his messenger hands him a letter from Madhav's lawyer, Gokul Chandra Das. He reads the letter and finds out that Madhav's aunt (Ramgopal's widowed wife) has filed a lawsuit against him, alleging that Ramgopal's will was forged and that Madhav has illegally obtained Ramgopal's property. Gokul reveals that he investigated and learnt that "councillors" have helped Madhav's aunt in this case, and that he's fighting the case with all his might. After finishing the letter, Madhav decides to meet his aunt and ventures into the zenana of his house and, after calming the chaos there, asks his matron about the whereabouts of his aunt. They both learn that Madhav's aunt has been seen near the pond of Mathur's house, during bathing time. Madhav suspects Mathur to be the supposed "councillor" and asks one of the women to go and ask his aunt to return, "and in case she refuses, know her reasons".

The story now returns to Matangini. Without having her dinner, she remains in her chamber, remembering her childhood and her happy days spent with her sister. She gets up to open the window, when she inadvertently eavesdrops on a conversation between 2 men taking place right outside her room, in the garden. The 2 men are Rajmohan and another man, seemingly a dacoit leader, only known as the Sardar. They're planning a dacoity in Madhav's house, intending to steal Ramgopal's will. Rajmohan asks for a huge share of the loot, in return for the information that he has provided to the dacoit. During this conversation, Rajmohan checks Matangini's room to ensure that she's asleep (she fakes sleep when he arrives to check) in order to pacify the Sardar who was worried that someone may hear them. When Rajmohan and the Sardar go away, the visibly afraid Matangini contemplates about her next move. She finally decides to warn Madhav about the dacoity. She ventures out of her house and travels to Madhav's house—nearly encountering the dacoits and exposing herself in the process—and finally reaches to his house. Upon meeting Madhav, she warns him of the dacoity. He arms all the guards of his house and waits for the dacoits. Soon, the dacoits are scared off when Madhav's guards howl at the top of their voices, thus averting a direct conflict. When Madhav thanks Matangini for her help, Matangini fails to restrain herself and reveals her love for him; when Hemangini's marriage proposal was fixed, Matangini met Madhav and was instantly attracted to him. At present, Madhav simply hears everything, but fails to do anything. Matangini leaves Madhav's house in the dawn, accompanied by Karuna, Madhav's housekeeper. In the ensuing storm, Matangini hurriedly returns home, where she's confronted by the infuriated Rajmohan, who has discovered her absence. Brandishing a knife, Rajmohan is about to kill Matangini when 2 dacoits, the Sardar and one of his men, Bhiku, break into the room from the window and viciously attack Rajmohan, presuming that he double-crossed them and foiled their dacoity. Rajmohan painstakingly explains everything; Rajmohan, Bhiku and the Sardar then get up to kill Matangini, only to discover that she has fled in the chaos. Rajmohan vows to kill Matangini.

We now find Matangini meeting with Kanak. She only reveals that Rajmohan's anger had compelled her to flee and that she's in dire need of a shelter. Help unexpectedly arrives in the form of Suki's mother, who offers to shelter Matangini in her relatives' house.

The story now shifts to Mathur's household. After a brief description of Mathur's poorly maintained house, we find Matangini conversing with the 28-year-old Tara, Mathur's elder wife, while Suki's mother has provided a brief-yet-embellished narrative of Matangini's misfortune. Hearing everything, Tara promises to do something about it, but they need Mathur's permission to let Matangini stay. Mathur enters the room a few minutes later, and after hearing everything from Tara, allows to shelter Matangini in his house. The 20-year-old Champak, Mathur's younger wife, however dislikes Matangini's presence in the house and is afraid of losing her husband's affection. A small altercation takes place between Mathur and Champak regarding this matter, with Champak constantly asking Mathur to not let Matangini stay in their house and Mathur saying otherwise. The matter remains unsolved that night.

The very next morning, a visitor claiming to be Rajmohan arrives to meet with Mathur and to take Matangini back, saying that he has "forgiven" her and wants her back. Matangini, more dead than alive, is returned to her husband.

The story now shifts to a hovel located deep in the forest of Radhaganj. The Sardar and Bhiku are inside the hovel, discussing about their next plan of stealing Ramgopal's will from Madhav's lawyer. Rajmohan arrives and tells them that he, much to his surprise, found Matangini in Mathur's house. They then discuss on getting rid of Matangini, with Rajmohan saying that though he hates her, his wish of killing her is gone now. The Sardar then asks Rajmohan to abandon his family, take Matangini with him and to join them as a fellow dacoit. Rajmohan initially hesitates to do so, but finally agrees due to the Sardar's threats and due to his own wish of leaving Madhav's neighborhood. After returning home and sitting down to have his lunch, Rajmohan asks his sister Kishori to call Matangini, whom he left in the company of Suki's mother to escort her home; Kishori informs him that Matangini hasn't returned. The angered Rajmohan sends Kishori and his aunt to find Matangini, only for them to return unsuccessful.

3 days have passed since Matangini's unexplained disappearance. Madhav, sitting in his room all alone, contemplates about the lawsuit of his aunt and Matangini's fate. Madhav soon gets up and stands on the balcony, unable to take his mind off of these thoughts, when he suddenly notices something weird in his garden. Arming himself with a small, silver-handled sword, Madhav ventures outside to see the oddity, when he hears a wild shriek, after which he's attacked and subsequently kidnapped by 2 physically powerful men.

On the other hand, we see Mathur trying to fall asleep in Tara's chamber, with Tara also present. Tara constantly asks Mathur the cause of his restlessness, but Mathur remains silent; at the end, he says that he can't reveal anything to her. When Tara is about to ask for a promise, they both hear a screech-owl's shriek which causes Mathur to rush out of the room. The shocked Tara tries to look for him from the balcony; after a long time, she sees him returning from the garden behind. Tara starts suspecting Mathur of some foul play.

The story now shifts to Madhav, who awakens, after his abduction, and finds himself all alone in a small, dark room, which is actually a godown room. Soon, the Sardar and Bhiku enter inside and reveal themselves to be his kidnappers. The trio converse with each other with Madhav constantly asking the Sardar who employed him for the kidnapping and the Sardar refusing to reply. Madhav figures out that it's Mathur and asks what he wants from him. The Sardar bluntly states that it's Ramgopal's will; Madhav can be released if he hands it over to them. After some contemplation, Madhav decides to write a letter to his family demanding the will, with the Sardar dictating the letter's content. All the while, the trio constantly hear an unnerving shriek emanating from within the house; after repeated failed attempts to find the source of the shriek, the Sardar and Bhiku flee from the place, completely overtaken by fear. Madhav, entirely free now, also proceeds to escape, only to stumble upon a figure revealed to be Tara, who happens to his childhood best friend. The duo then again hear the unnerving shriek.

In a small flashback, it's revealed how Madhav and Tara knew each other since childhood and became best friends. Back in the present, Tara reveals that, due to her suspicion, she arrived in the godown (the place where they're standing now) and tried to get in, only to be scared when the Sardar and Bhiku escaped from there. Madhav now brings her in the room and discloses everything to her. After some brief moments, the duo start looking for the source of the shriek. Madhav soon finds a small door, and after some initial failed attempts, opens it and finds a staircase. They both climb the stairs which is deep inside the house, find another door and open it, after similar failed attempts. Entering the room, the duo find a bed and a woman lying on it, whom they recognize as Matangini.

Retrieving Matangini from the room, Madhav and Tara revive her. Matangini soon discloses her side of the story: when Suki's mother (who was actually working for Mathur) was escorting Matangini back to Rajmohan's house, she understood Matangini's wish to remain away from him. Seizing this opportunity, Suki's mother tricked Matangini into following her to the dark chamber (from where she has just been retrieved) and trapping her there. Later, Mathur met Matangini and promised to make her subdue to him by starvation; Matangini defiantly refused by promising to starve herself.

When dawn breaks, Madhav returns to his home and Tara returns to her bedchamber. They plan to secretly escort Matangini out of there that evening, under Karuna's company. Tara is now convinced of Mathur's villainy. Later that evening, Karuna arrives and escorts Matangini to Madhav's house where she meets Hemangini. Matangini now reveals her wish to return to her father's house.

The following stormy evening, we see Mathur meeting with the Sardar. The Sardar discloses that he has come to warn Mathur. Bhiku has been arrested and that he has confessed everything to the police. The Sardar also reveals that he intends to escape that very night, and tells Mathur to stay safe. After returning to his room, Mathur plans to bribe the police, how to force Bhiku to retract his confession and starts thinking on how to deal with the newly posted Magistrate, an Irishman, when a law-officer arrives to meet him. The law-officer reveals that Bhiku's confession was also heard by the Irish Magistrate and that they're preparing to arrest Mathur. Mathur is left stunned at this.

The next morning, the Irish Magistrate arrives in Mathur's house, accompanied by a posse of policemen to personally arrest Mathur. After searching for him, they find that Mathur has hanged himself from the ceiling of a godown-room.

The story now comes to an abrupt conclusion, with the ensuing events revealed: the Sardar successfully fled from Radhaganj. Rajmohan was arrested; he partially confessed to the police, after which both he and Bhiku were incarcerated. Matangini went to live with her father. Nothing more is known about her, except that she died early. Tara, mourning for her husband's death, went on to live to her old age, and at the time of her demise, she was mourned by many. The fate of others (Madhav, Champak etc.) remains obscure with some dead and some still alive. The omniscient narrator now brings the story to an end and bids the reader farewell.
