= Mej Didi (1950 film) =

Bengali film

- Directed by: Sabyasachi
- Produced by: Kanan Devi
- Starring: Jahar Ganguly; Nripati Chattopadhyay; Tulsi Chakraborty; Kanan Devi; Renuka Ray; Shobha Sen; Ashu Bose; Kumar Mitra; Asha Devi; Sikharani Bag
- Music by: Kalipada Sen
- Production company: Sromati Pictures
- Release date: 1950
- Country: India

Mej Didi is a 1950 Bengali film directed by Sabyasachi and produced by Kanan Devi. The film's music was composed by Kalipada Sen. The film was remade in Hindi as Majhli Didi.

== Cast ==
- Kanan Devi as Mejdidi
- Jahar Ganguly
- Nripati Chattopadhyay
- Tulsi Chakraborty
- Shobha Sen
- Madhabi Mukherjee
- Ashu Bose
- Kumar Mitra
- Asha Devi
- Sikharani Bag
