= Jadu Bhatta (film) =

- Directed by: Niren Lahiri
- Written by: Nitai Bhattacharya
- Screenplay by: Nitai Bhattacharya
- Produced by: Sunrise Films
- Starring: Basanta Chowdhury; Chhabi Biswas; Ajit Prakash
- Cinematography: Bijoy Ghosh
- Edited by: Santosh Gangopadhyay
- Distributed by: Nandan Pictures Limited
- Release date: 16 November 1954
- Running time: 202 minutes
- Country: India
- Language: Bengali

Jadu Bhatta also known as Jadubhatta, is a 1954 Bengali-language Indian musical film directed by Niren Lahiri. Its story and screenplay were written by Nitai Bhattacharya. It stars Basanta Chowdhury in the title role and features Chhabi Biswas, Ajit Prakash, and Nitish Mukherjee in supporting roles. The film's music was composed by Jnan Prakash Ghosh.

The film was released on 16 November 1954. It won the Certificate of Merit for Best Bengali Language Feature Film at the 2nd National Film Awards .

== Cast ==
- Basanta Chowdhury - Jadu Bhatta
- Samar Kumar - Boy Jadubhatta
- Chhabi Biswas - Gangadhar Chakraborty
- Ajit Prakash - Ram Shankar Bhattacharya
- Nitish Mukherjee - Ali Baksa
- Prashant Kumar - Shabbir Khan
- Ranjan Mukherjee - Kashem Ali
- Bratin Tagore - Maharishi Debendranath Tagore
- Tulsi Chakraborty - Yatra Adhikari
- Anubha Gupta - Jhinnana
- Jamuna Singha - Rabeya
- Rani Banerjee - Ratan Bai
- Aparna Devi - Begum Saheba

== Music ==
The music for the film Jadu Bhatt was composed by Jnan Prakash Ghosh. The lyrics were written by Rabindranath Tagore, Mirabai, Jadu Bhatta, and Gouri Prasanna Majumdar . The songs were sung by Ramesh Chandra Banerjee, Mainuddin Dagar, Tarapada Chakraborty, A. T. Kanan, Pandit Maniram, Sukhendu Goswami, Pandit Jayasraj, Prashant Kumar, Sandhya Mukherjee, Pratima Banerjee, and Prasun Banerjee.

== Award ==
National Film Award
- 1954 : Certificate of Merit Second best feature film in Bengali (Won)
