= Bankim (disambiguation) =

Bankim is a common first name in West Bengal, India. People with that name include:

- Bankim Chandra Chattopadhyay, or Bankim Chandra Chatterjee, Bengali poet, writer and journalist
- Bankim Ghosh, Indian Actor
- Bankim Chandra Ghosh, Indian politician
- Bankim Chandra Ray, judge of Supreme Court, India and politician
- Bankim Chandra Hazra, Indian politician
- Bankim Mukherjee, Indian politician
- Bankim Bihari Pal, Indian revolutionary leader and politician

== Places ==
- Bankim, place in Adamawa,Cameroon

== Other uses ==
- Bankim Puraskar, award for Bengali literature
- Bankim Ghosh Memorial Girls' High School, High School in Kolkata,India
- Bankimnagar railway station, railway station in West Bengal, India
- Bankimanjali Stadium, Football stadium in West Bengal
- Pink Line, a.k.a Bankim Chandra Chatterjee Metro station, metro station in Kolkata
- Rishi Bankim Chatterjee College, a.k.a Bankim Chandra Chatterjee Colleges

== See also ==
- List of Bengali poets
