= Rishir Prem =

1931 film

- Directed by: Jyotish Bandyopadhyay
- Produced by: Madan Theatres Ltd
- Starring: Ahindra Choudhury; Hiren Bose; Kanan Debi; Sarajubala; Joynarayan Mukhopadhyay
- Music by: Hiren Bose; Dhiren Das
- Release date: 3 October 1931
- Country: India
- Language: Bengali

Rishir Prem written by Krishnadhan Dey (English translation: Love of a Sage) is a 1931 Bengali film directed by Jyotish Bandyopadhyay, produced by Madan Theatre Limited. It was released on 3 October 1931 at Crown Cinema Hall in Calcutta.

== Cast ==
- Ganesh Chandra Goswami as rishi
- Hiren Bose
- Kanan Devi as utpala
- Charubala
- Sarajubala
- Ahindra Choudhary
- Joy Narayan Mukherjee
