= Anandamath =

Novel by Bankim Chandra Chattopadhyay

- Title page of the second edition of the books
- Author: Bankim Chandra Chattopadhyay
- Original title: আনন্দ মঠ
- Translator: Julius J. Lipner
- Language: Bengali
- Genre: Nationalist
- Publisher: Ramanujan University Press, India
- Publication date: 1882
- Publication place: Chuchurah, West Bengal, India
- English publication date: 2005, 1941, 1906
- Media type: Print (Paperback)
- Pages: 336 pp

Anandamath (Bengali: আনন্দমঠ [ˈanonˌdomɔʈʰ]; lit. 'The Abbey of Bliss' or 'The Monastery of the Ānandas') is a Bengali Indian-nationalist historical novel, written by Bankim Chandra Chattopadhyay and published in 1882. It is inspired by and set in the background of the Sannyasi rebellion and Great Bengal famine of 1770. It is considered one of the most important novels in the history of Bengali and Indian literature.

The novel holds pro-British sentiments, and argues that the British rulers are the savior of India and Indians cannot overcome arrogance without the British rule. The novel has been also noted to have included anti-Muslim bias, on which M. R. A. Baig commented; "If the book is anti-Muslim, which it is, it was because the Hindus of that period were anti-Muslim. Bankim Chatterji was a novelist; not a propagandist."

Vande Mataram (lit. 'Hail to the Motherland'), the first song to represent India as the Motherland, was published in this novel. After India gained independence in 1947, it was adopted as the national song of the Republic of India in 1950.

== Plot summary ==
The book is set in the years during the famine in Bengal in 1770 CE. It starts with introduction to a couple, Mahendra and Kalyani, who are stuck in their village Padachinha without food and water in a time of famine. They decide to leave their village and move to the next closest city where there is a better chance of survival. While doing so, the couple become separated and Kalyani has to run through the forest with her infant to avoid getting caught by cannibals. After a long chase, she loses consciousness at the bank of a river. A Hindu "Santana" (common people who took the symbol of sanyasis and left their homes so as to rebel against the British East India Company) named Jiban takes the infant to his home, handing her to his sister, while he moves Kalyani to his ashram.

The husband Mahendra, at this point, is more inclined towards joining the brotherhood of the monks and serving the Mother Nation. Kalyani wants to help him attain his dreams by trying to kill herself, thereby relieving him of worldly duties. At this point, Mahatma Satyananda joins her but before he can help her, he is arrested by the East India Company soldiers, because other monks were fuelling the revolt against Company rule. While being dragged away he spots another monk who is not wearing his distinctive robes and sings,

"In mild breeze, by the bank of the river,
In the forest, resides a respectable lady."

The other monk deciphers the song, rescues Kalyani and the baby, and takes them to a rebel monk hideout. Concurrently, Mahendra is also given shelter by the monks; thus Mahendra and Kalyani are reunited. The leader of the rebels shows Mahendra the three faces of Bharat Mata (Mother India) as three goddess idols being worshipped in three consecutive rooms:

1. What Mata was – an idol of goddess Jagaddhatri, referring to the past glory of Bengal/India
2. What Mata has become – an idol of goddess Kali, a reference to the economic exploitation of the land & the famine
3. What Mata will be – an idol of goddess Durga, referring to their vision for a future India.

Gradually, the rebel influence grows and their ranks swell. Emboldened, they shift their headquarters to a small brick fort. The East India Company troops attack the fort with a large force. The rebels blockade the bridge over the nearby river, but they lack any artillery or military training. In the fighting, the troops make a tactical retreat over the bridge. The Sanyasis' unorganised army, lacking military experience, chases the troops into the trap. Once the bridge is full of rebels, the East India Company artillery opens fire, inflicting severe casualties.

However, some rebels manage to capture some of the cannons, and turn the fire back on to the East India Company lines. The East India Company troops are forced to fall back, the rebels winning their first battle. The story ends with Mahendra and Kalyani building a home again, with Mahendra continuing to support the rebels.

The song Vande Mataram is sung in this novel. Vande Mataram means "I bow to thee, Mother". It inspired freedom fighters in the 20th century and its first two stanzas became the national song of India after independence.

== Characters ==
- Mahendra: A wealthy zamindar from Padachihna, living with his wife (Kalyani) and daughter (Sukumari). They are forced to leave the village to find a new mode of living. Mahendra is initiated to the Anandamath by Mahatma Satya. The Guru orders Mahendra to use his wealth to manufacture ammunition for the Anandamath.
- Mahatma Satyananda: An ascetic who leads a band of rebels. The founder and main guru of Anandamath, a rebel group opposing Company rule in India. His disciples are required to renounce their attachments until India is freed. Mahatma Satyananda was acting upon the orders of his guru, a mysterious saint, who explains his true motives. The Guru explains Mahatma Satyananda that Indians need objective knowledge from the East India Company to once more understand the subtle truths of the ancient scriptures. Mahatma Satya goes with his guru to the Himalayas for penance.
- Bhavananda: A brave commander of Anandamath who dies during the battle against the East India Company.
- Jivananda: A member of the band of rebels and a brave warrior. The most accomplished and loyal disciple of Mahatma Satya. He rescues Mahendra's family and reunites them. His wife and lover, Shanti, later becomes the first and only woman to join the Anandamath and fights alongside Jivananda. In the end Jivananda is grievously injured in battle but is revived by Shanti. The young married couple decide to go on a pilgrimage and live as ascetics.
- Navin a.k.a. Shanti: She is the tomboyish, well-educated daughter of a Brahmin. She was orphaned at a young age and became strong and physically fit. Shanti then met Jivananda, who married her out of pity as she had no one to take care of her. However, Jivananda left Shanti as a part of renouncing his attachments and to fight for Anandamath. Shanti was left in the care of Jivannanda's married sister, Nimai. However, she was deeply in love with her husband and could not bear to live away from him. So, she disguises herself as a man and joins Anandamath as a freedom fighter. Mahatma Satyananda tries to forbid her from entering, but he is shocked at Shanti's physical strength when she strings a mighty bow which only he, Jivananda, and Bhavananda were able to do. Mahatma Satyananda then allows Shanti to stay and gives her the name Navin. Shanti rescues Kalyani from dacoits. She gathers intelligence from the East India Company and fights in battles alongside her husband. At the end of the battle, at nightfall, Shanti discovers Jivananda's seemingly lifeless body and grieves for him. Mahatma Satyananda gives Shanti a herb, with which she revives Jivananda. Shanti suggests Jivananda that they go on a pilgrimage and live together in a forest as ascetics, to which her husband reluctantly agrees.

== Commentary ==
The story's setting was based on the time period around the devastating Bengal famine of 1770 during the period of Company rule in India and unsuccessful Sannyasi rebellion. In the book, Chatterjee imagines an alternative history where untrained Sannyasi soldiers defeat the experienced East India Company forces.

It has been argued that many aspects of the novel were also inspired by the life and activities of Vasudev Balwant Phadke.

The novel holds pro-British sentiments, and argues that the British rulers are the savior of India and Indians cannot overcome arrogance without the British rule.

The novel has been also noted to have included anti-Muslim bias, on which M. R. A. Baig commented:

"If the book is anti-Muslim, which it is, it was because the Hindus of that period were anti-Muslim. Bankim Chatterji was a novelist; not a propagandist."

== In adaptation ==
=== Film ===
The novel was later adapted into a film, Anand Math in 1952, directed by Hemen Gupta, starring Prithviraj Kapoor, Bharat Bhushan, Pradeep Kumar, Ajit and Geeta Bali. The music was composed by Hemant Kumar, who gave a version of the Vande Mataram sung by Lata Mangeshkar, which became a cult success.

=== Other ===
It was adapted as a comic in the 655th and 10028th issue and also in a Special Issue Great Indian Classic of the Indian comic book series, Amar Chitra Katha.
