= Kanan Devi =

Indian singer and actress (1916–1992)

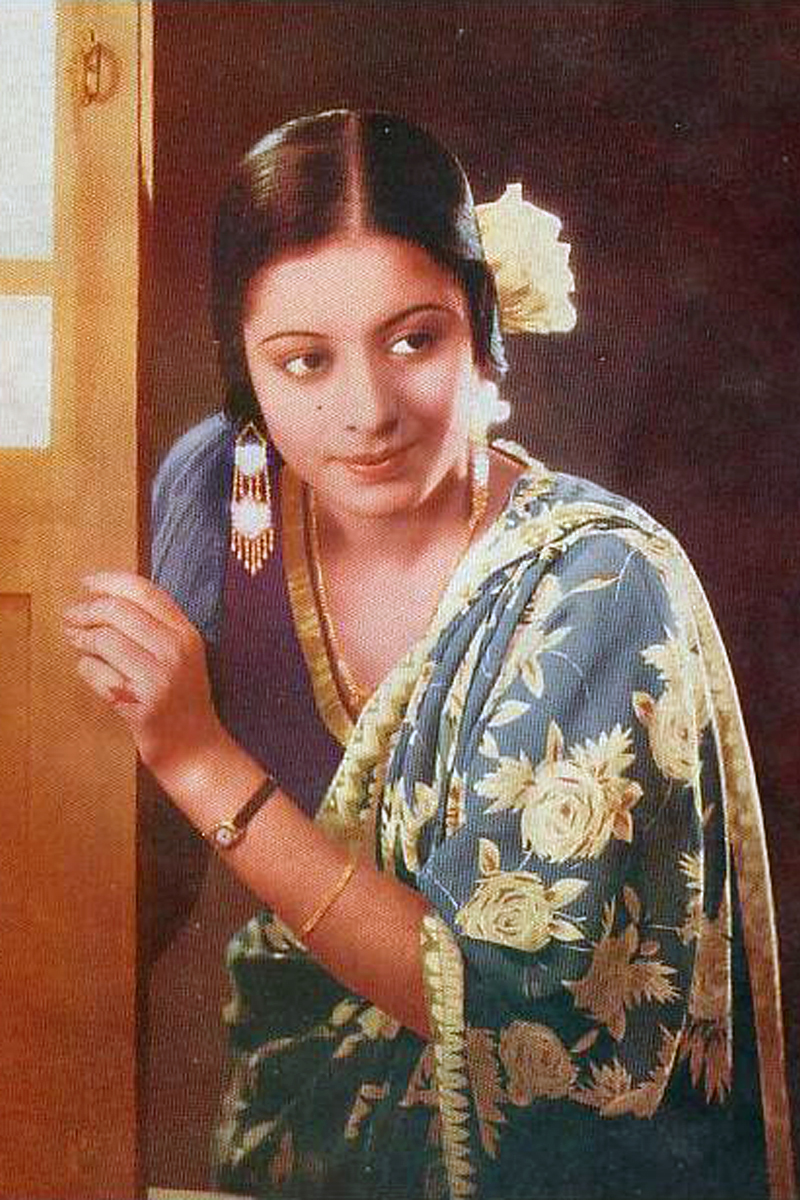
- Kanan Devi in the 1930s
- Born: 22 April 1916; Howrah, Bengal Presidency, British India
- Died: 17 July 1992 (aged 76); Kolkata, West Bengal, India
- Occupation: Actress
- Spouse: Haridas Bhattacharjee
- Children: Siddharth Bhattacharya

Kanan Devi singing "Ami Banaphul Go"
From the 1942 film Shesh Uttar

Kanan Devi (22 April 1916 – 17 July 1992) was an Indian actress and singer. She was among the early singing stars of Indian cinema, and is credited popularly as the first star of Bengali cinema. Her singing style, usually in rapid tempo, was used instrumentally in some of the biggest hits of New Theatres, Kolkata.

== Biography ==
Kanan Bala was born on 22 April 1916 in Howrah, West Bengal in a Mahishya family to Ratan Chandra Das and Rajobala Devi. Her father was financially affluent, having not only a well paid job but also a jewellery shop, but lost all his earnings in vices such as gambling and drinking. After the death of her father, young Kanan and Rajobala were left to fend for themselves. Her life story is a true tale of rags to riches. Some say she did her schooling (not completed) from Howrah's St. Agnes' Convent School.

A well wisher, Tulsi Banerji, whom she called Kaka babu, introduced Kanan when she was only ten to Madan Theatres/Jyoti Studios, where she was cast in a small role in Jaidev (1926), followed by Shankaracharya in 1927. She was known as Kanan Bala.

Kanan did at least five films with Madan Theatres productions, (1926–1932) Rishir Prem (1931), Jorebarat (1931), Vishnu Maya (1932) and Prahlad, playing even male leads in the last two.

She then worked with Radha Films from 1933 to 1936, then with New Theatres from 1937 to 1941, with MP Productions 1942 to 1948 and finally set up her own label Shrimati Pictures, 1949 to 1965. She starred in the 1932 film Char Darvesh which was also the debut film for Trilok Kapoor, younger brother of Prithviraj Kapoor

From silent film roles as a child artist, Kanan made the successful transition into talkie films and was noticed with Jorebarat (1931), Manomoyee Girls School, Khooni Kaun and Maa (1934).

Her films with Jyotish Bannerjee included Joydev (1926), Rishir Prem (1931), Jorebarat (1931), Vishnumaya (1932), Kantahaar (1935) and Manomoyee Girls School (1935). Her films with Prafulla Ghosh were Sree Gouranga (1933), Char Darvesh (1933), Maa (1934) and Hari Bhakti. Others with Radha Film Company were Kanthahar (1935), Krishna Sudama (1936), Bishabriksha (1936 film) and Char Darvesh (1933).

New Theatres's P.C. Barua wanted her to play the lead in his Devdas (1935), but, due to contractual reasons with Radha, she could not act in the film, a factor she regretted all her life.

The films of New Theatres, owned by Biren Sircar, established her as a superhit singer and her films ran to packed audiences. She had to travel under constant protection, given her huge fan following. During her years with New Theatres, Calcutta from 1937, she played the lead in Barua's Mukti (1937), which was perhaps her finest performance, making her the studio's top star. Apart from Mukti, she did Vidyapati, Saathi (1938), Street Singer (1938), Sapera (1939), Jawani Ki Reet (1939), Parajay (1939), Abhinetri (1940), Lagan (1941), Parichay (1941) and Jawab (1942). She became known as Kanan Devi from this point.

She came in contact with the music maestro Rai Chand Boral, who not only coached and familiarized her in the Hindi accent, but experimented with many classical Western and Indian forms in his music. She received her initial musical training under Alla Rakha. She was employed as a singer at the Megaphone Gramaphone Company, receiving further training under Bhishmadev Chatterjee. She later learnt Rabindra Sangeet under Anadi Dastidar. Kanan remained the top star of New Theatres until she resigned her contract in 1941 and began to freelance in Bengali and Hindi films.

She worked with the biggest names in Indian cinema with K. L. Saigal, Pankaj Mullick, Pramathesh Ch Barua (P.C. Barua, maker of film Devdas), Pahari Sanyal, Chabi Biswas, Trilok Kapoor and Ashok Kumar.

M.P. Productions's Jawaab was perhaps her biggest hit. Her song Duniya Yeh Duniya, Hai Toofan Mail was well received. She repeated the same feat in Hospital (1943), Banphool (1945) and Rajlakshmi (1946). Kanan Devi's last Hindi film was Chandrashekhar (1948), with Ashok Kumar.

Kanan turned producer with Shrimati Pictures in 1949 and later launched the Sabyasachi Collective with the film Ananya (1949). Her own productions were mainly based on the stories of Sharat Chandra Chattopadhyay.

== Personal life ==
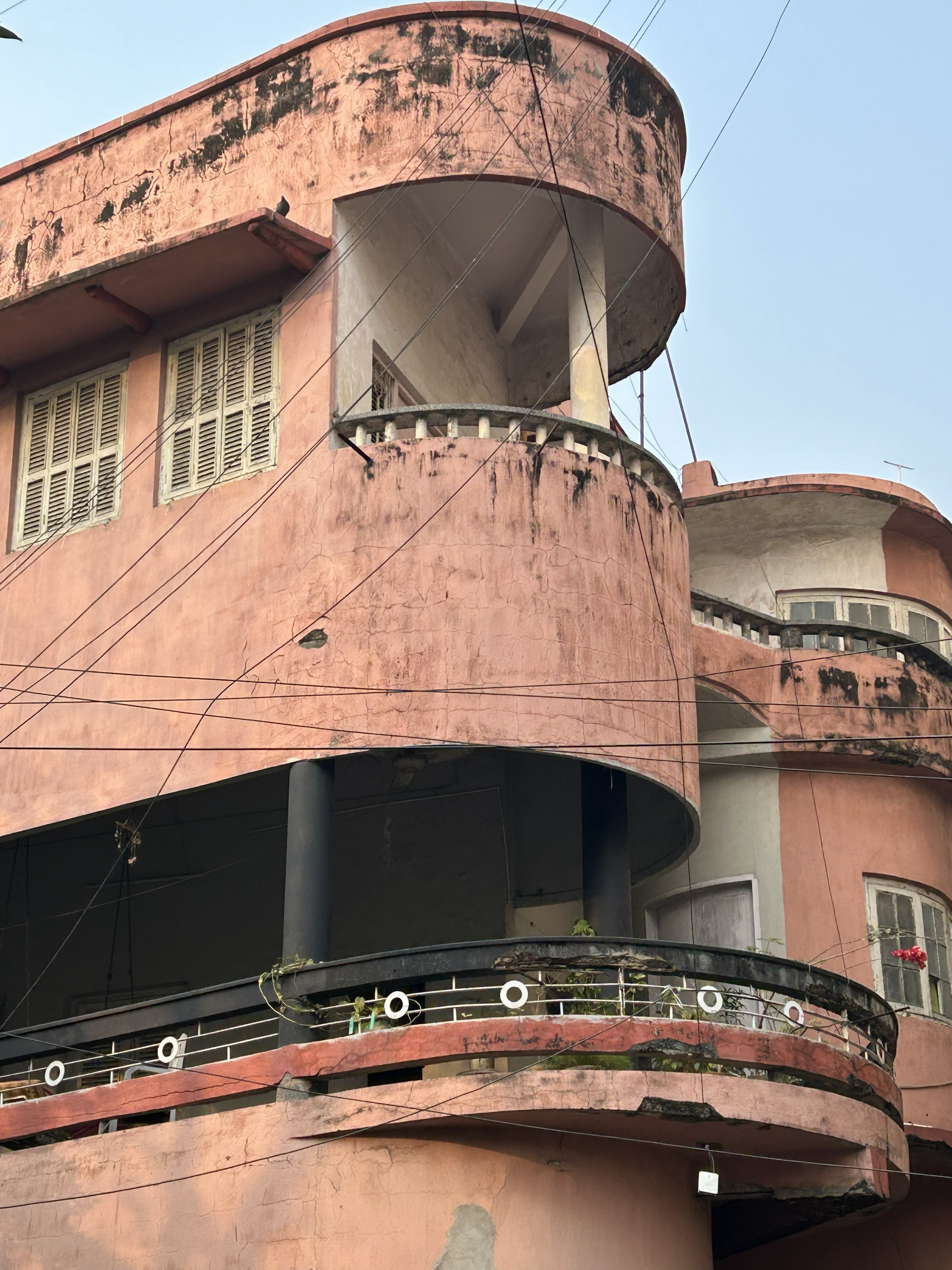
The house of Kanan Devi in Kolkata

Kanan married Ashok Maitra in December, 1940. He was the son of the staunch Brahmo Samaj educationist Heramba Chandra Maitra. Despite their best intentions, the marriage could not withstand the severe condemnation by the then conservative society. Even the poet Rabindranath Tagore, who sent a token gift to the married couple received scathing criticism for blessing the couple. The main issue was that Kanan was not expected to be working in films after her marriage. She filed for divorce in 1945. Despite the pain of the divorce, Kanan expressed her immense gratitude towards her first husband for giving her social recognition through marriage for the first time in her life. To Kanan's credit, she maintained excellent relations with Rani Mahanalobis, sister to Ashok Maitra and her husband, the famous social scientist P C Mahalanobis and with Kusumkumari Devi, Ashok Maitra's mother, even after the marriage was severed.

Kanan married Haridas Bhattacharjee around 1949. Haridas Bhattacharjee was then ADC to the Governor of Bengal. He eventually left the naval service to join Kanan in her filmmaking venture and became a competent director. While raising their son Siddharth in Calcutta, she also formed and worked as the president of Mahila Shilpi Mahal, an organization to help senior female artists and other charitable and community causes, including those for the betterment of Bengali cinema.

Kanan Devi lived in number 13 Kabir Road near Rabindra Sarobar for sometime.

Kanan Devi, as the first lady of the Bengali screen, received many honours for her contribution to Indian cinema. An honorary degree, a D. Litt, was awarded to her from Vishwabharati, the Padma Shree in 1968 and the Dadasaheb Phalke Award in 1976.

== Death ==
She died on 17 July 1992 in Bellevue Clinic, Calcutta when she was around seventy-six years of age.

== Honours and accolades ==
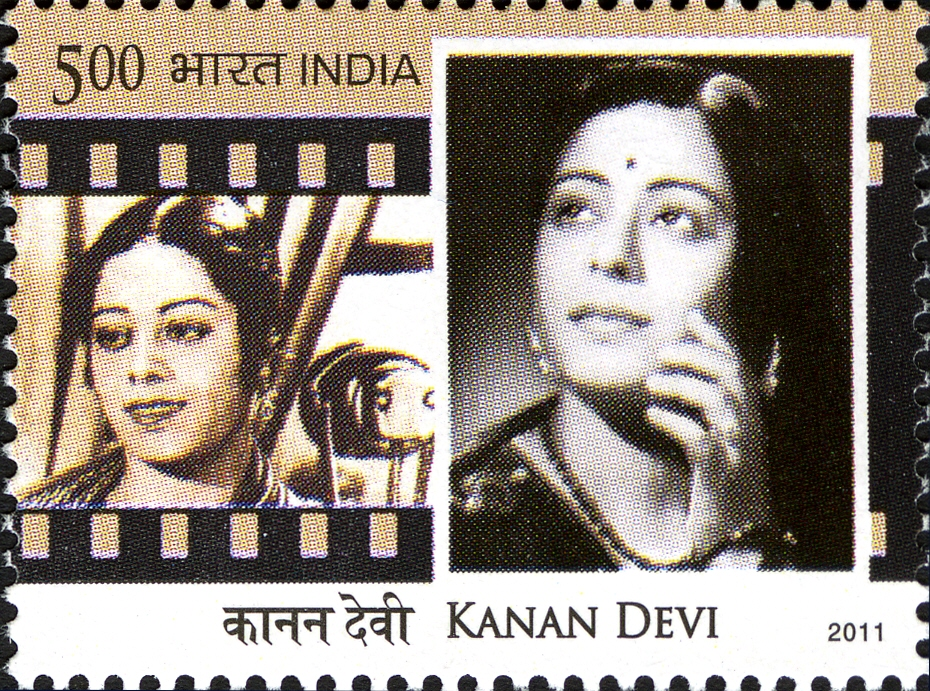
Devi on a 2011 stamp of India

- 1942: BFJA Award – Best Actress Award for Parichaya
- 1943: BFJA Award – Best Actress Award for Shesh Uttar
- Padma Shri Award – 1968
- Dadasaheb Phalke Award – 1976

A postage stamp, bearing Kanan's likeness, was released to honour her by India's Ministry of State for Communication and Information Technology in February 2011.

== Filmography ==
=== Actor ===
Year	Film Name	Director	Remarks
1926	Joydev	Jyotish Bannerji	
1927	Shankaracharya	D.G. Kali Prasad	
1931	Rishir Prem	Jyotish Bannerji	
1931	Jore Barat	Jyotish Bannerji	Short
1932	Bishnumaya	Jyotish Bannerji	
1932	Prahlad	Priyanath Ganguly	
1932	Vishnu Maya	Jyotish Bannerji	
1933	Sree Gouranga	Prafulla Ghosh	
1933	Char Darvesh	Prafulla Ghosh	
1934	Maa	Prafulla Ghosh	
1934	Hari Bhakti	Prafulla Ghosh	
1935	Kanthahaar	Jyotish Bannerji	
1935	Manmoyee Girls School	Jyotish Bannerji	
1935	Basabdatta	Satish Dasgupta	
1936	Bishabriksha (1936 film)	Phani Burma	
1936	Krishna Sudama	Phani Burma	
1936	Khooni Kaun	G. R. Sethi	
1936	Maa	Prafulla Ghosh	
1937	Vidyapati	Debaki Bose	
1937	Mukti	Pramathesh Chandra Barua	
1937	Vidyapati	Debaki Bose	Filmed simultaneously in Hindi and Bengali. the latter version titled Bidyapati
1938	Sathi	Phani Majumdar	
1938	Street Singer	Phani Majumdar	
1939	Sapera	Debaki Bose	
1939	Sapurey	Debaki Bose	
1940	Jawani-Ki-Reet	Hemchandra Chunder	
1940	Parajay	Hemchandra Chunder	
1940	Haar Jeet	Amar Mullick	
1940	Abhinetri	Amar Mullick	
1941	Parichay	Nitin Bose	
1941	Lagan	Nitin Bose	
1942	Shesh Uttar	Pramathesh Chandra Barua	
1942	Jawab	Pramathesh Chandra Barua	
1943	Jogajog	Sushil Majumdar	
1943	Jogajog	Sushil Majumdar	
1944	Bideshini	Premendra Mitra	
1945	Path Bendhe Dilo	Premendra Mitra	
1945	Banphool	Niren Lahiri	
1945	Raj Lakshmi	Premendra Mitra	
1946	Tumi Aar Aami	Apurba Kumar Mitra	
1946	Krishna Leela	Debaki Bose	
1946	Arabian Nights (1946 film)	Niren Lahiri	
1947	Chandrasekhar	Debaki Bose	
1947	Faisla	Apurba Kumar Mitra	
1948	Bankalekha	Chitta Bose	
1948	Anirban	Soumyen Mukherjee	
1949	Ananya	Sabyasachi	
1949	Anuradha	Pranab Roy	
1950	Mej Didi	Ajay Kar	
1952	Darpachurna		
1954	Nababidhan	Haridas Bhattacharya	
1955	Debatra	Haridas Bhattacharya	
1956	Asha	Haridas Bhattacharya	
1957	Andhare Alo	Haridas Bhattacharya	
1958	Rajlakshmi O Srikanta	Haridas Bhattacharya	
1959	Indranath Srikanta O Annadadidi	Haridas Bhattacharya	

=== Playback singer ===
1. Asha (1956) (playback singer)
2. Debatra (1955) (playback singer)
3. Naba Bidhan (1954) (playback singer)
4. Darpachurna (1952) (playback singer)
5. Mejdidi (1950) (playback singer)
6. Ananya (1949) (playback singer)
7. Anirban (1948) (playback singer)
8. Bankalekha (1948) (playback singer) ... a.k.a. The Crooked Writing
9. Faisla (1947) (playback singer)
10. Chandrashekhar (1947) (playback singer)
11. Arabian Nights (1946) (playback singer)
12. Krishna Leela (1946) (playback singer) ... a.k.a. Radha Krishna Prem ... a.k.a. The Story of Lord Krishna
13. Tum Aur Main (1946) (playback singer)
14. Tumi Aar Aami (1946) (playback singer)
15. Ban Phool (1945) (playback singer)
16. Path Bendhe Dilo (1945) (playback singer)
17. Rajlaxmi (1945) (playback singer)
18. Bideshini (1944) (playback singer)
19. Jogajog (1943) (playback singer)
20. Jawab (1942) (playback singer) ... a.k.a. Shesh Uttar (India: Bengali title) ... a.k.a. The Last Reply
21. Lagan (1941) (playback singer)
22. Parichay (1941) (playback singer) ... a.k.a. Acquaintance ... a.k.a. Marriage
23. Abhinetri (1940) (playback singer)
24. Haar Jeet (1940) (playback singer)
25. Jawani Ki Reet (1939) (playback singer)
26. Parajay (1939) (playback singer)
27. Sapera (1939) (playback singer) ... a.k.a. The Snake-Charmer (India: English title)
28. Sapurey (1939) (playback singer) ... a.k.a. The Snake-Charmer (India: English title)
29. Bidyapati (1937) (playback singer)
30. Mukti (1937/I) (playback singer) ... a.k.a. Freedom ... a.k.a. The Liberation of the Soul
31. Mukti (1937/II) (playback singer)
32. Vidyapati (1937) (playback singer)
33. Bishabriksha (1936) (playback singer) ... a.k.a. The Poison Tree
34. Krishna Sudama (1936) (playback singer) ... a.k.a. Krishna and Sudama
35. Manmoyee Girls School (1935) (playback singer)
36. Maa (1934) (playback singer)
37. Char Darvesh (1933) (playback singer) ... a.k.a. Merchant of Arabia (India: English title)
38. Vishnumaya (1932) (playback singer) ... a.k.a. Doings of Lord Vishnu
39. Jore Barat (1931) (playback singer)
40. Prahlad (1931/I) (playback singer)

=== Producer ===
1. Abhaya O Srikanta (1965) (producer)
2. Indranath Srikanta O Annadadidi (1959) (producer)
3. Rajlakshmi O Srikanta (1958) (producer)
4. Andhare Alo (1957) (producer)
5. Asha (1956) (producer)
6. Debatra (1955) (producer)
7. Naba Bidhan (1954) (producer)
8. Darpachurna (1952) (producer)
9. Mejdidi (1950) (producer)
10. Ananya (1949) (producer)
11. Bamuner Meye (1949) (producer)
