= Vande Mataram =

National song of India

Vande Mātaram
English: I Bow to Thee, O Mother
- वन्दे मातरम् বন্দে মাতরম্‌
- Vande Mataram written by Bankim Chandra Chatterjee set to Raag Desh as performed on All India Radio
- National song of India
- Lyrics: Bankim Chandra Chatterjee, Anandamath (1882)
- Music: Jadunath Bhattacharya (original); Hemanta Mukherjee (film version)
- Adopted: 24 January 1950; 76 years ago

Audio sample
- Vande Mataram played on the Mohan veena by Vishwa Mohan Bhatt in 2017: file; help

"Vande Mātaram" (Note: Bengali: বন্দে মাতরম্ [ˈbɔn̪d̪eˑ ˈmat̪ɔɾom]; Hindi: [ˈʋən̪d̪eː ˈmɑːt̪ɾəm]; Sanskrit: वन्दे मातरम् [ˈʋɐn̪d̪eː ˈmɑːt̪ɐɾɐm]) (Note: Translated literally into English as 'I Praise You, Motherland'; Transcreated into English as "I Bow to Thee, Mother") is a poem that was adopted as the national song of the Republic of India in 1950. It was written in Bengali by Bankim Chandra Chatterjee in the 1870s, and was first published in 1882 as part of Chatterjee's Bengali novel Anandamath.

The poem is an ode to the motherland; it was officially adopted by the Indian National Congress in 1905 to serve as a pan-Indian, nationalist salutation to Mother India during the Indian independence movement, culminating in its 1950 designation as the National Song of the Republic of India, sharing equal honour with India's National Anthem.

The first two verses of the song make abstract reference to the "mother" and "motherland", without any religious connotation. However, later verses mention Hindu goddesses such as Durga. The references to Hindu deities became a point of contention in 1937, after which the Indian National Congress, on suggestion of Mahatma Gandhi and Rabindranath Tagore, adopted the first two stanzas as the national song. While historically lacking codified legal etiquette, the Government of India in 2026 encouraged the full six-stanza rendition at formal state events and extended statutory penal protections for disruption of its singing similar to the national anthem.

== History ==
=== Composition ===
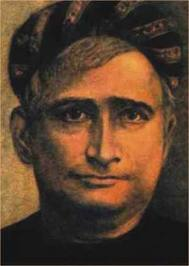
Bankim Chandra Chattopadhyay

Bankim Chandra Chatterjee was one of the earliest graduates of the newly established Calcutta University. After completing his Bachelor of Arts, he joined the colonial government as a civil servant, becoming a Deputy Collector and later a Deputy Magistrate. Chattopadhyay was very interested in recent events in Indian and Bengali history, particularly the Revolt of 1857 and the previous century's Sanyasi Rebellion. Around the same time, the administration was trying to promote "God Save the King" as the anthem for Indian subjects, which Indian nationalists disliked. It is generally believed that the concept of "Vande Mataram" came to Chatterjee when he was still a government official, around 1876. He wrote "Vande Mataram" at Chinsura (Chuchura), in a white colour house of Adhya Family near Hooghly river (near Jora Ghat) in West Bengal.

The novel Anandamath is noted for pro-British sentiments. In this novel, Chatterjee argues that the British rulers are the saviour of India and Indians cannot overcome arrogance without the British rule.

Chattopadhyay wrote the poem in a spontaneous session using words from Sanskrit and Bengali. The poem was published in Chattopadhyay's book Anandamath in 1882, which is set in the events of the Sannyasi Rebellion. Jadunath Bhattacharya was asked to set a tune for this poem just after it was written.

=== Indian independence movement ===
Flag of India 1907

"Vande Mataram" was one of the most popular songs of protest during the Indian independence movement. The colonial government in response banned the book and made the recital of the song in public a crime. The colonial government imprisoned many independence activists for disobeying the order, but workers and general public repeatedly violated the ban many times by gathering together in the presence of colonial officials and singing it. Rabindranath Tagore sang "Vande Mataram" in 1896 at the Calcutta Congress Session held at Beadon Square. Dakhina Charan Sen sang it five years later in 1901 at another session of the Congress at Calcutta. Poet Sarala Devi Chaudurani sang the song in the Benares Congress Session in 1905. Lala Lajpat Rai started a journal called "Vande Mataram" from Lahore. Hiralal Sen made India's first political film in 1905 which ended with the chant. Matangini Hazra's last words as she was shot to death by the Crown police were "Vande Mataram".

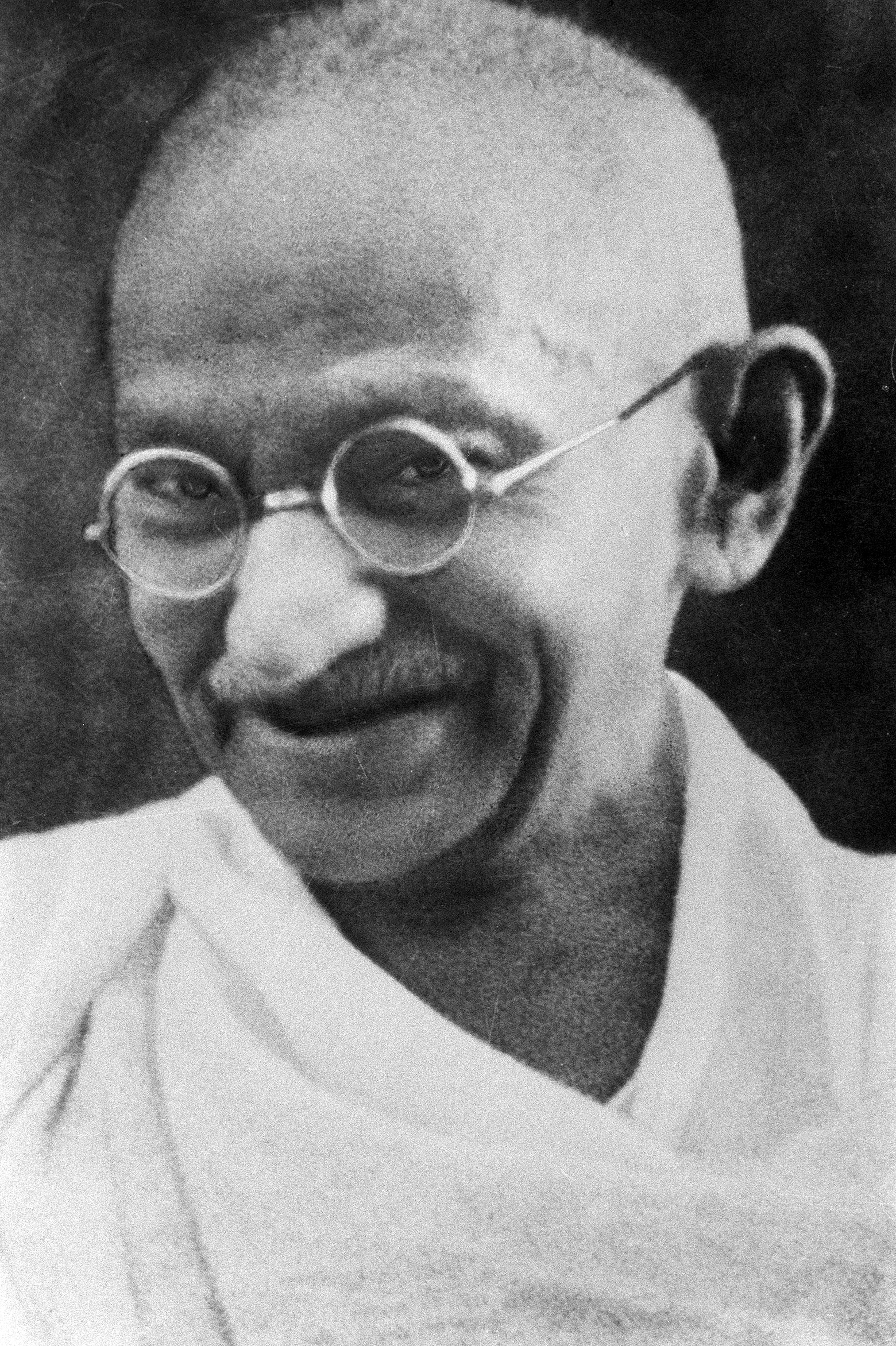
Mahatma Gandhi supported the first two verses of Vande Mataram as a national song.

On 20 May 1906 in Barisal (now Bangladesh), more than ten thousand people, both Hindus and Muslims, marched together with Vande Mataram flags in a landmark nationalist procession.

In 1907, Bhikaiji Cama (1861–1936) created the first version of India's national flag (the Tiranga) in Stuttgart, Germany, in 1907. It had "Vande Mataram" written on it in the middle band.

A book titled Kranti Geetanjali published by Arya Printing Press (Lahore) and Bharatiya Press (Dehradun) in 1929 contains the first two stanzas of the lyrics on page 11 as Matra Vandana, and a ghazal composed by Bismil was also given on its back, i.e. page 12. The book written by the famous martyr of Kakori Pandit Ram Prasad Bismil was proscribed by the colonial government.

Mahatma Gandhi supported adoption and the singing of the Vande Mataram song. In January 1946, in a speech given in Guwahati (Assam), he urged that "Jai Hind should not replace Vande-mataram". He reminded everyone present that Vande-mataram was being sung since the inception of the Congress. He supported the "Jai Hind" greeting, but remanded that this greeting should not be to the exclusion of Vande Mataram. Gandhi was concerned that those who discarded Vande Mataram given the tradition of sacrifice behind it, one day would discard "Jai Hind" also. (Note: This view of Gandhi was not isolated. In another interview, he said, "a song that carried such glorious associations of sacrifice as "Vandemataram" could never be given up. It would be like discarding one’s mother. But they could certainly add a new song or songs like the one mentioned to their repertoire of national songs after due thought and discrimination.")

=== Adoption as national song of India ===
Parts of the "Vande Mataram" was chosen as the national song in 1937 by the Indian National Congress as it pursued the independence of India from colonial rule, after a committee consisting of Maulana Azad, Jawaharlal Nehru, Subhash Chandra Bose, Acharya Deva, and Rabindranath Tagore recommended the adoption. The entire song was not selected by Hindu leaders in order to respect the sentiments of non-Hindus, and the gathering agreed that anyone should be free to sing an alternate "unobjectionable song" at a national gathering if they do not want to sing Vande Mataram because they find it "objectionable" for a personal reason. According to the gathered leaders, including the Nobel Laureate Rabindranath Tagore, through the first two stanzas began with an unexceptionable evocation of the beauty of the motherland, in later stanzas there are references to the Hindu goddess Durga. Tagore believed Vande Mataram could not unite all communities. The All-India Muslim League and Muhammad Ali Jinnah completely opposed the song in 1937.

In 1937, Indian National Congress President Subhas Chandra Bose asked Tagore for his views on Vande Mataram. Tagore replied:

The core of Vande Mataram is a hymn to goddess Durga: this is so plain that there can be no debate about it. Of course Bankim Chandra does show Durga to be inseparably united with Bengal in the end, but no Mussulman can be expected patriotically to worship the ten-handed deity as 'Swadesh' [our native land]. . . . The novel Anandamath is a work of literature, and so the song is appropriate in it. But Parliament is a place of union for all religious groups, and there the song cannot be appropriate.

Thereafter, with the support of Mahatma Gandhi and Jawaharlal Nehru, the Indian National Congress decided to adopt only the first two stanzas as the national song to be sung at public gatherings, and other verses that included references to Durga and Lakshmi were removed.

Rajendra Prasad, who was presiding the Constituent Assembly on 24 January 1950, made the following statement which was also adopted as the final decision on the issue:

...The composition consisting of the words and music known as Jana Gana Mana is the National Anthem of India, subject to such alterations in the words as the Government may authorise as occasion arises; and the song Vande Mataram, which has played a historic part in the struggle for Indian freedom, shall be honoured equally with Jana Gana Mana and shall have equal status with it. (Applause). I hope this will satisfy the Members.

—Constituent Assembly of India, Vol. XII, 24-1-1950

=== Identification with Mother India and Mother Bengal ===
While the poem is an ode to the motherland, and the text does not explicitly name the figure, the question of its intended subject is debated. Even though some argue that, the poem initially refers to Mother Bengal a view supported by Sri Aurobindo, who referred to it as the "National Anthem of Bengal," conversely, a more substantial number of bipartisan political parties, historians and national sources emphasize the poem's broader significance as a pan-Indian symbol: it was officially adopted by the Indian National Congress (INC) for all-India use in 1905 and again by the Congress Working Committee in 1937 when it was sung by the Nobel laureate Rabindranath Tagore to serve as a militant salutation to Bharat Mata (Mother India), a concept integral to the pan-Indian Indian independence movement against the colonial British Raj. Its status as a symbol of the larger national resistance culminated in the Constituent Assembly granting it official status as the National Song in 1950, to be honoured equally with the National Anthem. Adopted by the Constituent Assembly of India on 24 January 1950, Vande Mataram is the national song of the Republic of India, sharing equal honour with the national anthem, Jana Gana Mana. This status was initially affirmed by President Rajendra Prasad, and reaffirmed by the Madras High Court in 2017, and the Bhartiya Janta Party-ruled Government of India in November 2022, despite the Constitution of India containing no explicit reference to a "national song".

The poem played a vital role in the Indian independence movement. It first gained political significance when it was recited by Rabindranath Tagore at Congress in 1896. By 1905, it had become popular amongst political activists and freedom fighters as a marching song. The first two verses of the poem were adopted as the National Song of India in October 1937 by the Congress. The song, as well as Anandamath, were banned under British colonial rule under threat of imprisonment, making its use revolutionary. The ban was ultimately overturned by the Indian government upon independence in 1947.

== Official status as the national song ==
On 24 January 1950, the Constituent Assembly of India adopted "Vande Mataram" as the national song of the Republic of India. President of India Rajendra Prasad stated that the song should be honoured equally with the national anthem of India, "Jana Gana Mana".

In July 2017, the Madras High Court ruled that the "Vande Mataram" shall be sung or played at least once a week in all schools, universities and other educational institutions of Tamil Nadu. The Court also ruled that the song should be played or sung in government offices and industrial facilities at least once a month. However, in November 2017, the Madras High Court backtracked and left the decision for the Tamil Nadu's government to make the decision. In November 2022, the Union government filed an affidavit at the Delhi High Court, stating that "Jana Gana Mana" and "Vande Mataram" would "stand on the same level" and should be accorded equal respect by citizens, even though the Constitution of India does not make an explicit reference to a "national song".

On 6 February 2026, Ministry of Home Affairs issued guidelines for the rendition of Vande Mataram as part of commemorations marking the 150th anniversary of the national song. It fixed the official rendition time at 3 minutes and 10 seconds, instructed that all attendees must stand at attention while the song is being played, endorsed performing the full six-stanza version during formal government functions attended by the President or Governors, before and after presidential addresses broadcast on radio and television, when the National Flag is brought on parade, or other such occasions.

In May 2026, the Union Cabinet approved a legislative amendment to include Vande Mataram under the Prevention of Insults to National Honour Act, 1971, extending the legal protections previously reserved for the national anthem and national flag and establishing penal provisions for deliberate disrespect or disruption during its rendition.

== Lyrics ==
The complete original lyrics of the "Vande Mataram" are available at Vande Mataram – via Wikisource.

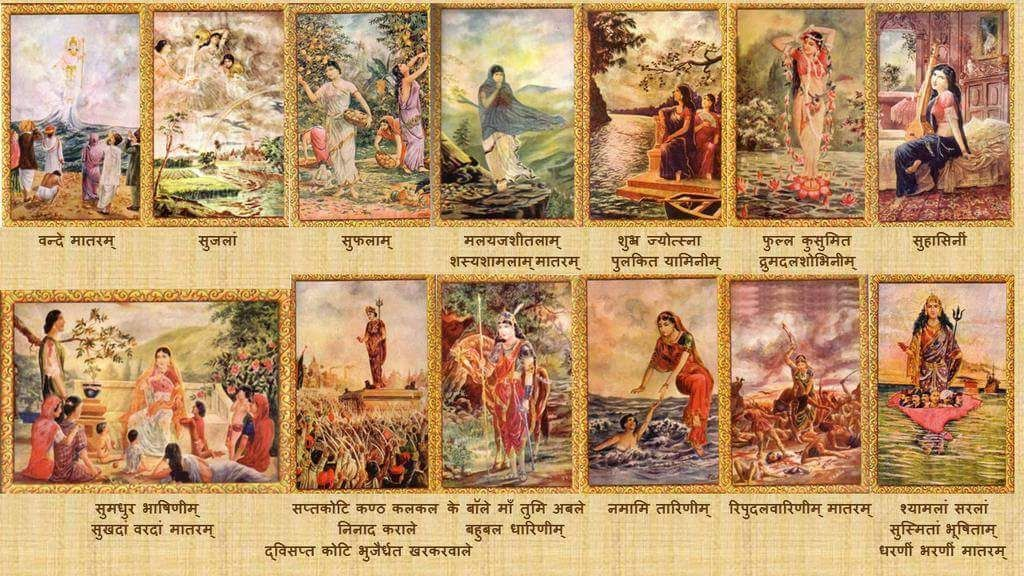
A rare painting of Indian national song, Vande Mataram, published in 1923

বন্দে মাতরম্
(Bengali original)

বন্দে মাতরম্ ৷
সুজলাং সুফলাং
মলয়জশীতলাম্
শস্যশ্যামলাং
মাতরম্ !
বন্দে মাতরম্ ৷

শুভ্রজ্যোৎস্না-পুলকিতযামিনীম্
ফুল্লকুসুমিত-দ্রুমদলশোভিনীম্,
সুহাসিনীং সুমধুরভাষিণীম্
সুখদাং বরদাং মাতরম্ ৷৷
বন্দে মাতরম্ ৷

সপ্তকোটীকণ্ঠ-কলকল-নিনাদকরালে,
দ্বিসপ্তকোটীভুজৈর্ধৃতখরকরবালে,
অবলা কেন মা এত বলে !
বহুবলধারিণীং
নমামি তারিণীং
রিপুদলবারিণীং
মাতরম্ ৷
বন্দে মাতরম্ ৷

তুমি বিদ্যা তুমি ধর্ম্ম (Note: Sometimes written as ধর্ম)
তুমি হৃদি তুমি মর্ম্ম (Note: Sometimes written as মর্ম)
ত্বং হি প্রাণাঃ শরীরে ৷
বাহুতে তুমি মা শক্তি,
হৃদয়ে তুমি মা ভক্তি,
তোমারই প্রতিমা গড়ি মন্দিরে মন্দিরে ৷

ত্বং হি দুর্গা দশপ্রহরণধারিণী
কমলা কমল-দলবিহারিণী
বাণী বিদ্যাদায়িণী
নমামি ত্বাং
নমামি কমলাম্
অমলাং অতুলাম্,
সুজলাং সুফলাং
মাতরম্

বন্দে মাতরম্
শ্যামলাং সরলাং
সুস্মিতাং ভূষিতাম্
ধরণীং ভরণীম্
মাতরম্ ৷
বন্দে মাতরম্ ৷

Vande Mātaram
(Romanisation)

Vande Mātaram.
Sujalāṃ suphalāṃ
Malayajaśītalām
Śasyaśyāmalāṃ
Mātaram.
Vande Mātaram.

Śubhra-jyotsnā-pulakita-yāminīm
Phullakusumita-drumadalaśobhinīm,
Suhāsinīṃ sumadhurabhāṣiṇīm
Sukhadāṃ varadāṃ Mātaram.
Vande Mātaram.

Saptakoṭīkanṭha-kala-kala-ninādakarāle
Dvisaptakoṭībhujairdhṛtakharakaravāle,
Abalā kena mā eta bale!
Bahubaladhāriṇīṃ
Namāmi tāriṇīṃ
Ripudalavāriṇīṃ
Mātaram.
Vande Mātaram.

Tumi vidyā tumi dharma
Tumi hṛdi tumi marma
Tvaṃ hi prāṇāḥ śarīre.
Bāhute tumi mā śhakti,
Hṛdaye tumi mā bhakti,
Tomārai pratimā gaṛi mandire mandire.

Tvaṃ hi Durgā daśapraharaṇadhārinī
Kamalā kamala-dalavihāriṇī
Vānī vidyādāyiṇī
Namāmi tvaṃ
Namāmi kamalām
Amalāṃ atulām,
Sujalāṃ suphalāṃ
Mātaram
Vande Mātaram.

Vande Mātaram
Śyāmalāṃ saralāṃ
Susmitāṃ bhūṣitām
Dharaṇīṃ bharanīm
Mātaram.

वन्दे मातरम्
(Devanagari transliteration)

वन्दे मातरम्
सुजलां सुफलाम्
मलयजशीतलाम्
शस्यश्यामलाम्
मातरम्।
वन्दे मातरम्।

शुभ्रज्योत्स्नापुलकितयामिनीम्
फुल्लकुसुमितद्रुमदलशोभिनीम्
सुहासिनीं सुमधुर भाषिणीम्
सुखदां वरदां मातरम्॥
वन्दे मातरम्।

सप्त-कोटि-कण्ठ-कल-कल-निनाद-कराले
द्विसप्त-कोटि-भुजैर्धृत-खरकरवाले,
अबला केन मा एत बले
बहुबलधारिणीं
नमामि तारिणीं
रिपुदलवारिणीं
मातरम्॥
वन्दे मातरम्।

तुमि विद्या, तुमि धर्म
तुमि हृदि, तुमि मर्म
त्वम् हि प्राणा: शरीरे
बाहुते तुमि मा शक्ति,
हृदये तुमि मा भक्ति,
तोमारई प्रतिमा गडी मन्दिरे-मन्दिरे॥

त्वम् हि दुर्गा दशप्रहरणधारिणी
कमला कमलदलविहारिणी
वाणी विद्यादायिनी,
नमामि त्वाम्
नमामि कमलाम्
अमलां अतुलाम्
सुजलां सुफलाम्
मातरम्॥
वन्दे मातरम्।

वन्दे मातरम्
श्यामलाम् सरलाम्
सुस्मिताम् भूषिताम्
धरणीं भरणीं
मातरम्॥

== Translation ==
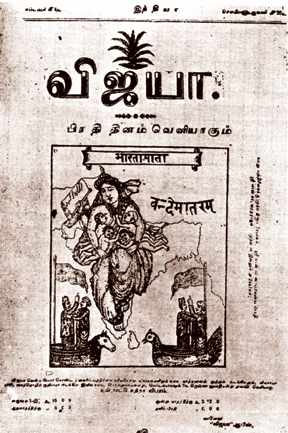
Cover of a 1909 issue of the Tamil magazine Vijaya showing "Mother India" (Bharat Mata) with her diverse progeny and the rallying cry "Vande Mataram"

=== English translation ===
The first translation of Bankim Chandra Chattopadhyay's novel Anandamath, including the poem "Vande Mataram", into English was by Nares Chandra Sen-Gupta, with the fifth edition published in 1906 titled "The Abbey of Bliss".

Here is the translation in prose of the above two stanzas rendered by Sri Aurobindo Ghosh. This has also been adopted by the Government of India's national portal. The original "Vande Mataram" consists of six stanzas and the translation in prose for the complete poem by Shri Aurobindo appeared in Karmayogin, 20 November 1909.

Mother,I praise thee!
Rich with thy hurrying streams,
Bright with thy orchard gleams,
Cool with the winds of delight,
Dark fields waving, Mother of might,
Mother free.

Glory of moonlight dreams,
Over thy branches and lordly streams,
Clad in thy blossoming trees,
Mother, giver of ease,
Laughing low and sweet,
Mother, I kiss thy feet,
Speaker sweet and low,
Mother, to thee I bow. [Verse 1]

Who hath said thou art weak in thy lands,
When the swords flash out in seventy million hands,
And seventy million voices roar
Thy dreadful name from shore to shore?
With many strengths who art mighty and strong,
To thee I call, Mother and Lord!
Thou who savest, arise and save!
To her I cry who ever her foemen drove
Back from plain and Sea
And shook herself free. [Verse 2]

Thou art wisdom, thou art law,
Thou art heart, our soul, our breath
Thou art love divine, the awe
In our hearts that conquers death.
Thine the strength that nerves the arm,
Thine the beauty, thine the charm.
Every image divine.
In our temples is but thine. [Verse 3]

Thou art Goddess Durga, Lady and Queen,
With her hands that strike and her swords of sheen,
Thou art Goddess Kamala (Lakshmi), lotus-throned,
And Goddess Vani (Saraswati), bestower of wisdom known
Pure and perfect without peer,
Mother lend thine ear,
Rich with thy hurrying streams,
Bright with thy orchard gleams,
Dark of hue O candid-fair [Verse 4]

In thy soul, with jewelled hair
And thy glorious smile divine,
Loveliest of all earthly lands,
Showering wealth from well-stored hands!
Mother, mother mine!
Mother sweet, I bow to thee,
Mother great and free! [Verse 5]

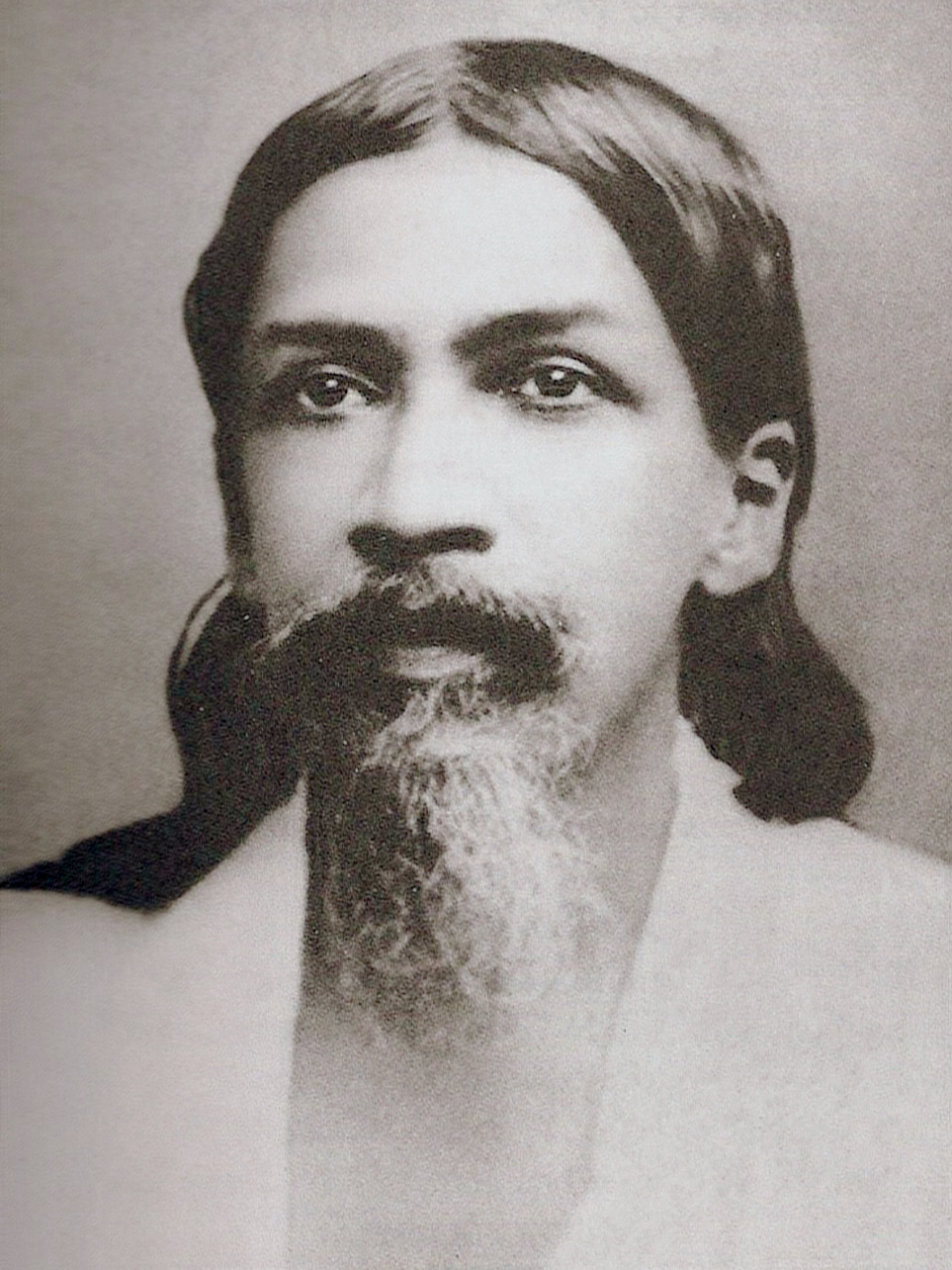
Sri Aurobindo Ghose

Apart from the above prose translation, Sri Aurobindo also translated "Vande Mataram" into a verse form known as "Mother, I Praise Thee". Sri Aurobindo commented on his English translation of the poem that "[it] is difficult to translate the National Song of India into verse in another language owing to its unique union of sweetness, simple directness and high poetic force."

=== Translation into other languages ===
"Vande Mataram" has inspired many Indian poets and has been translated into numerous Indian languages, such as Tamil, Telugu, Kannada, Odia, Malayalam, Assamese, Hindi, Marathi, Gujarati, Punjabi, Urdu, and others. (Note: The Assamese version, re-translated into English, reads: "O my own land, O my dear land, O my dear land, A land bedecked with gentle streams, A land that adorned with heavenly beauty, It is such a motherland." – Lakshminath Bezbarua, Translated into English by A Mazumdar)

Arif Mohammad Khan translated "Vande Mataram" into Urdu. It can be read in Urdu (Devanagari script) as:

Devanagari script

तस्लीमात, माँ तस्लीमात
तू भरी है मीठे पानी से
फल फूलों की शादाबी से
दक्खिन की ठंडी हवाओं से
फ़सलों की सुहानी फ़िज़ाओं से
तस्लीमात, माँ तस्लीमात
तेरी रातें रौशन चाँद से
तेरी रौनक़-ए-सब्ज़-फ़ाम से
तेरी प्यार भरी मुस्कान है
तेरी मीठी बहुत ज़ुबान है
तेरी बांहों में मेरी राहत है
तेरे क़दमों में मेरी जन्नत है
तस्लीमात, माँ तस्लीमात

Nastaliq (original orthography)

تسلیمات، ماں تسلیمات
تُو بھری ہے میٹھے پانی سے
پھل پھولوں کی شادابی سے
دکھن کی ٹھنڈی ہواؤں سے
فصلوں کی سُہانی فضاؤں سے
تسلیمات، ماں تسلیمات
تیری راتیں رَوشن چاند سے
تیری رونقِ سبز فام سے
تیری پیار بھری مُسکان ہے
تیری میٹھی بہت زُبان ہے
تیری باہوں میں میری راحت ہے
تیرے قدموں میں میری جَنَّت ہے
تسلیمات، ماں تسلیمات

== In popular culture ==
The poem has been set to a large number of tunes. The oldest surviving audio recordings date to 1907, and there have been more than a hundred different versions recorded throughout the 20th century. Many of these versions have employed traditional Indian classical ragas. Versions of the song have been visualised on celluloid in a number of films, including Leader, Amar Asha, and Anand Math. It is widely believed that the tune set for All India Radio station version was composed by Ravi Shankar. Hemant Kumar composed music for the song in the movie Anand Math in 1952. Many singers like Lata Mangeshkar, K. S. Chithra sung made it cult classic. In 2002, BBC World Service conducted an international poll to choose ten most famous songs of all time. Around 7000 songs were selected from all over the world. "Vande Mataram", from the movie Anand Math, was ranked second. All India Radio's version and some other versions are in Desh raga.

- Vande Mataram, 1997 studio album by Indian musician A. R. Rahman.
- Vandae Maatharam, 2010 Indian action film in Malyalam and Tamil featuring Mammootty and Arjun Sarja

== See also ==
- Anthems and mottos
  - Jana Gana Mana, the Indian national anthem
  - Jaya Bharata Jananiya Tanujate, anthem in Kannada language for Mother India
  - Shubh Sukh Chain, another anthem which became popular during Indian freedom movement
  - List of Indian state anthems
- National god
  - National personification
  - Tutelary deity
  - Banga Mata, Mother Bangla
  - Bharat Mata, Mother India
  - Tamil Thai, Mother Tamil
  - Telugu Thalli, Mother Telugu
  - Telangana Thalli, Mother Telangana
- Other
  - Anandamath, the novel from which "Vande Mataram" gained popularity
  - National Pledge of India
  - Vande Mataram (album)
