= Bankim Chandra Chatterjee =

Indian Bengali writer, poet and journalist (1838–1894)

Bankim Chandra Chattopadhyay
- বঙ্কিমচন্দ্র চট্টোপাধ্যায়
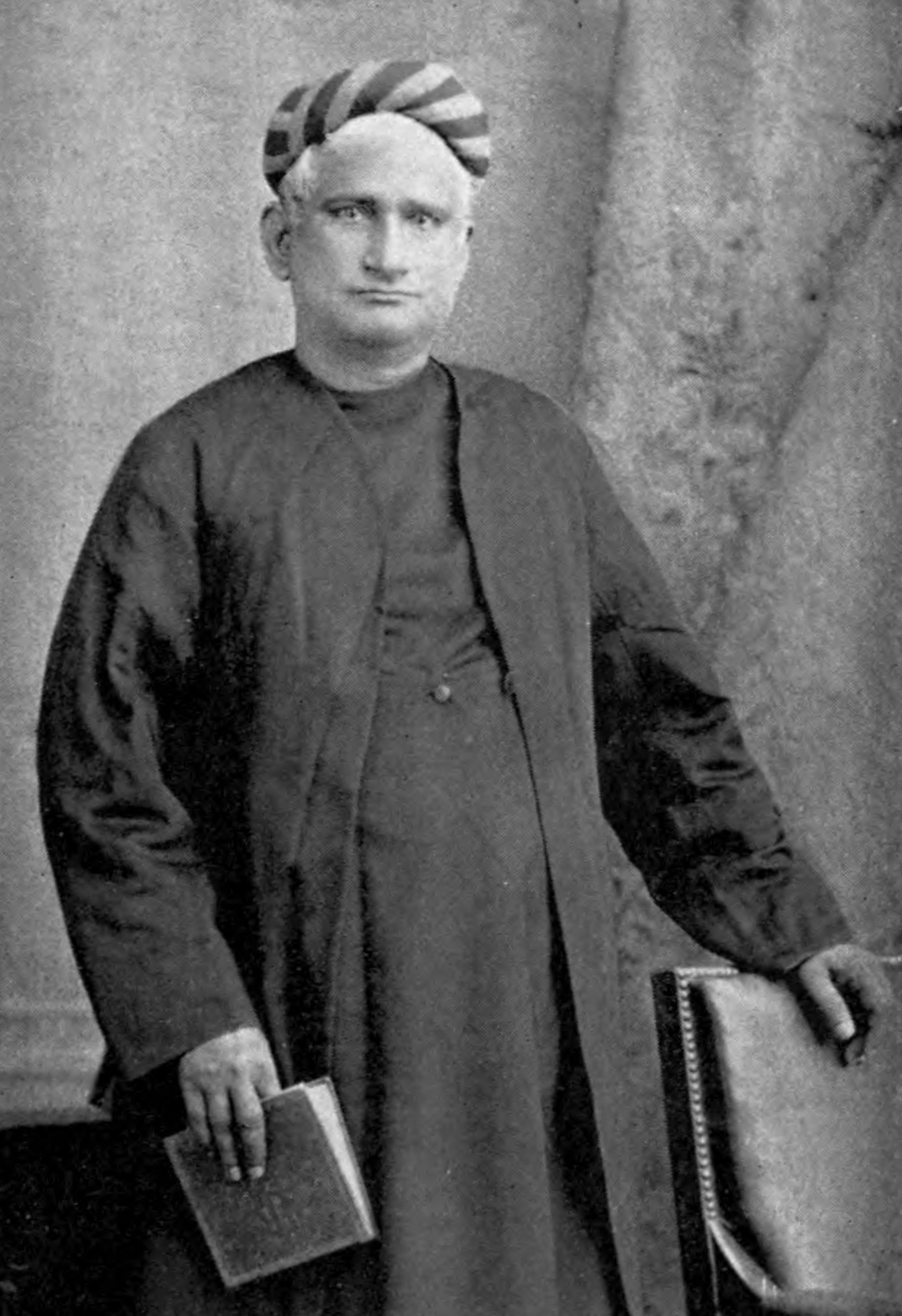
- Born: 26 June 1838; Kathalpara, Naihati, Bengal, British India
- Died: 8 April 1894 (aged 55); Calcutta, Bengal, British India
- Education: University of Calcutta
- Occupations: Writer, poet, novelist, essayist, journalist, government official
- Writing career
- Pen name: Kamalakanta
- Language: Bengali, English
- Notable works: Durgeshnandini; Kapalkundala; Devi Chaudhurani; Anandamath; Bishabriksha
- Movement: Bengal Renaissance
- Website: Bankim-Rachanabali administrated by eduliture

Bankim Chandra Chattopadhyay CIE (anglicised as Bankim Chandra Chatterjee; 26 June 1838 – 8 April 1894) was a Bengali novelist, poet, essayist and journalist.

Noted for his pro-British stance, he accepted the legitimacy of the British rule and supported English education.

He was the author of the 1882 Bengali language novel Anandamath, which is one of the landmarks of modern Bengali and Indian literature. He was the composer of Vande Mataram, written in highly Sanskritised Bengali, personifying India as a mother goddess. Chattopadhayay wrote fourteen novels and many serious, serio-comic, satirical, scientific and critical treatises in Bengali. He is known as Sahitya Samrat (Emperor of Literature) in Bengali.

== Biography ==
Chattopadhayay is widely regarded as a key figure in literary renaissance of Bengal as well as the broader Indian subcontinent. Some of his writings, including novels, essays and commentaries, broke away from traditional verse-oriented Indian writings, and provided an inspiration for authors across India.

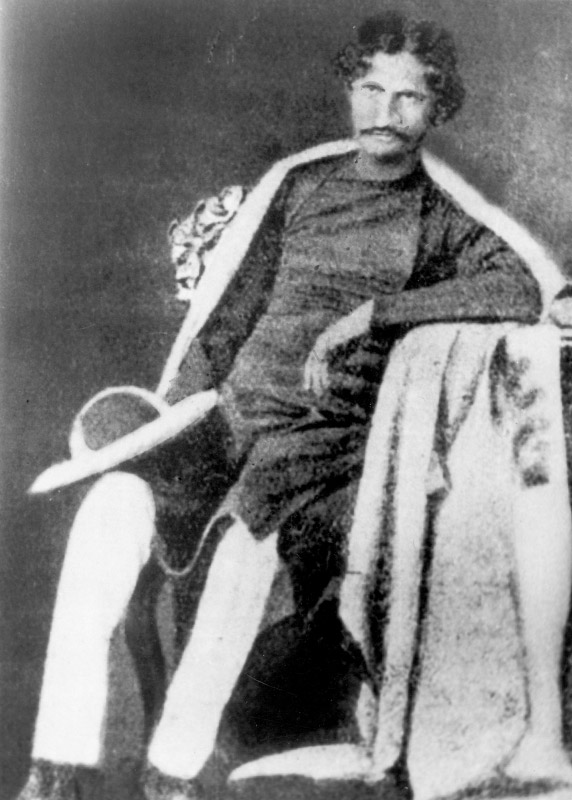
Bankim Chandra Chatttapadhyay in his early age

Chattopadhayay was born in the village of Kanthalpara in the town of North 24 Parganas, Naihati, in an orthodox Bengali Brahmin family, the youngest of three brothers, to Yadav Chandra Chattopadhayay and Durgadebi. His Grandfather Shiv Narayan Chatterjee. His ancestors hailed from Deshmukho village in Hooghly District. His father, a government official, went on to become the Deputy Collector of Midnapur. One of his brothers, Sanjib Chandra Chattopadhyay was also a novelist and is known for his book "Palamau". Bankim Chandra and his elder brother both went to Hooghly Collegiate School and Midnapore Collegiate School (then Governmental Zilla School), where he wrote his first poem. He was educated at the Hooghly Mohsin College and later at Presidency College, Kolkata, graduating with a degree in arts in 1859. He later attended the University of Calcutta and was one of two candidates who passed the final exam to become the school's first graduates. He later obtained a degree in law in 1869. Following his father's footsteps, Bankimchandra joined the Subordinate Executive Service. In 1858, he was appointed a Deputy Magistrate (the same type of position held by his father) of Jessore. After merging of the services in 1863, he went on to become Deputy Magistrate & Deputy Collector, retiring from government service in 1891. Bankim Chandra Chattopadhyay was the first in-charge (Sub-divisional magistrate) of the Arambag subdivision in its earlier days. The ruins of a fort at Gar Mandaran provided the setting for Bankim Chandra Chattopadhyay's novel Durgeshnandini, published in 1865. His years at work were replete with incidents that brought him into conflict with the colonial government. He was, however, made a Companion of the Most Eminent Order of the Indian Empire (CMEOIE) in 1894. He also received the title of Rai Bahadur in 1891.

He held pro-British and anti-Muslim stance. Having accepted the legitimacy of the British rule, he supported English education. In his writings, he used fictional characters to represent Muslims as oppressive and Hindus as victims. He concluded that Muslims will rule over Hindus if the British left South Asia.

== Literary career ==
Chattopadhyay's earliest publications were in Ishwar Chandra Gupta's weekly newspaper Sangbad Prabhakar. He began his literary career as a writer of verse before turning to fiction. His first attempt was a novel in Bengali submitted for a declared prize. He did not win and the novelette was never published. His first fiction to appear in print was the English novel Rajmohan's Wife. Durgeshnandini, his first Bengali romance and the first ever novel in Bengali, was published in 1865. His essay 'Shakuntala, Miranda ebong Desdemona' (1873) is considered as the first attempt of comparative analysis of different literatures in Bengali and is studied closely in school of comparative literature of Jadavpur University.

Second edition of Anandamath (1883)

One of the many novels of Chattopadhyay that are entitled to be termed as historical fiction is Rajsimha (1881, rewritten and enlarged 1893). Anandamath (The Abbey of Bliss, 1882) is a political novel which depicts a Sannyasi (Hindu ascetic) army fighting a British force. The book calls for the rise of Indian nationalism. The novel was also the source of the song Vande Mataram (I worship my Motherland for she truly is my mother) which, set to music by Rabindranath Tagore, was taken up by many Indian nationalists, and is now the National Song; ultimately, however, he accepted that the British Empire could not be defeated. The novel first appeared in serial form in Bangadarshan, the literary magazine that Chattopadhyay founded in 1872. Vande Mataram became prominent during the Swadeshi movement, which was sparked by Lord Curzon's attempt to partition Bengal into a Hindu majority West and Muslim majority East. Drawing from the Shakti tradition of Bengali Hindus, Chattopadhyay personified India as a Mother Goddess known as Bharat Mata, which gave the song a Hindu undertone.

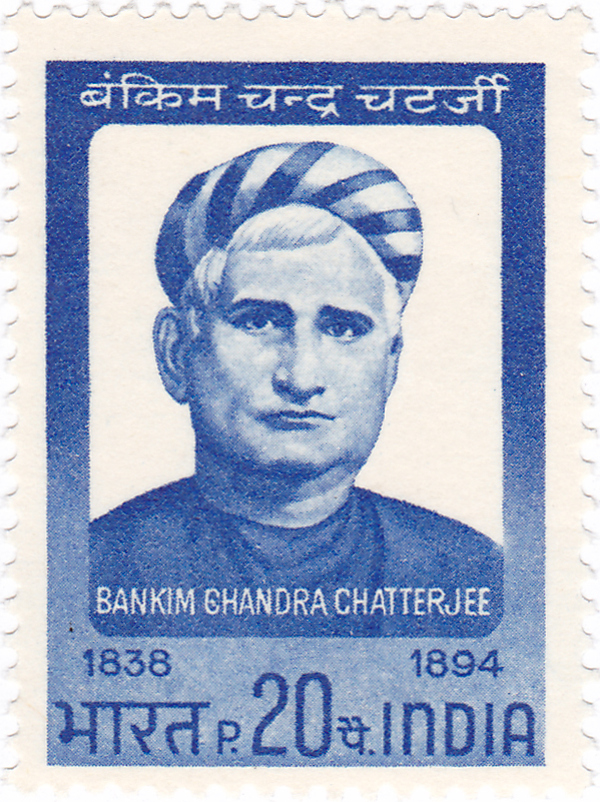
Bankim Chandra Chatterjee on a 1969 stamp of India

Bankim was particularly impressed by the historical Gaudiya Vaishnava cultural efflorescence of the 14th and 15th centuries in Bengal. Chattopadhyay's commentary on the Bhagavad Gita was published eight years after his death and contained his comments up to the 19th Verse of Chapter 4. In a long essay on Sankhya philosophy, he argues that the central philosophical foundation of the overwhelming part of religious beliefs in India, including even Buddhism, lies in the philosophy of Sankhya. He was a critique of the philosophy in the sense of its emphasis on personal vairagya (renunciation) rather than political and social power.

== Meeting with Ramakrishna ==
Bankim was highly educated and influenced by Oriental thoughts and ideas. Ramakrishna in contrast, did not have knowledge of English. Yet, they had a nice relationship. In their first and perhaps only meeting, Ramakrishna humorously asked Bankim why his body was bent (as Bankim in Bengali meant bent) and Bankim remarked that it was due to the kicks of the British. Perhaps knowing Bankim's fondness for the Sankhya philosophy, Ramakrishna evoked Krishna and Radhika as the Purusha and Prakriti of Sankhya..

== Legacy ==
Tagore penned in the memory of his mentor: "Bankim Chandra had equal strength in both his hands, he was a true sabyasachi (ambidextrous). With one hand, he created literary works of excellence; and with the other, he guided young and aspiring authors. With one hand, he ignited the light of literary enlightenment; and with the other, he blew away the smoke and ash of ignorance and ill conceived notions"

Sri Aurobindo wrote in his memory: "The earlier Bankim was only a poet and stylist, the later Bankim was a seer and nation-builder"

After the Vishabriksha (The Poison Tree) was published in 1873, the magazine, Punch wrote:

"You ought to read the Poison Tree
of Bankim Chandra Chattopadhyay."

His novel Anushilan-Tattva inspired Pramathanath Mitra to start Anushilan Samiti. Bankim Puraskar (Bankim Memorial Award) is the highest award given by the Government of West Bengal for contribution to Bengali fiction.

== Works ==
Fiction

- Durgeshnandini (March 1865)
- Kapalkundala (1866)
- Mrinalini (1869)
- Bishabriksha (The Poison Tree, 1873)
- Indira (1873, revised 1893)
- Jugalanguriya (1874)
- Radharani (1876, enlarged 1893)
- Chandrasekhar (1875)
- Kamalakanter Daptar (From the Desk of Kamlakanta, 1875)
- Rajani(1877)
- Krishnakanter Uil (Krishnakanta's Will, 1878)
- Rajsimha (1882)
- Anandamath (1882), Orient Paperbacks, ISBN 978-81-222013-0-7
- Devi Chaudhurani (1884)
- Kamalakanta (1885)
- Sitaram (March 1887)
- Muchiram Gurer Jivancharita (The Life of Muchiram Gur)

Religious Commentaries

- Krishna Charitra (Life of Krishna, 1886)
- Dharmatattva (Principles of Religion, 1888)
- Devatattva (Principles of Divinity, Published Posthumously)
- Srimadvagavat Gita, a Commentary on the Bhagavad Gita (1902 – Published Posthumously)

Poetry Collections

- Lalita O Manas (1858)

Essays

- Lok Rahasya (Essays on Society, 1874, enlarged 1888)
- Bijnan Rahasya (Essays on Science, 1875)
- Bichitra Prabandha (Assorted Essays), Vol 1 (1876) and Vol 2 (1892)
- Samya (Equality, 1879)

Chattopadhyay's debut novel was an English one, Rajmohan's Wife (1864) and he also started writing his religious and philosophical essays in English.

== See also ==
- List of Indian writers
- Sadhu Bhasha – Historical literary register of Bengali
- Bankim (disambiguation)
