= Brahma Dharma =

Brahma Dharma refer to Hindu denominations that revere Brahma as the supreme:

- Brahmo Samaj or Brahmoism a Bengali religious movement by Ram Mohan Roy
  - Brahmo Dharma, a Bengali religious book by Debendranath Tagore (c. 1848)
- Bodo Brahma Dharma religious movement of Kalicharan Brahma amongst Bodo people of Assam
