= Brahmos =

Brahmos may refer to:

- Brahmos, adherents of the Hindu religious movement Brahmoism
- BrahMos Aerospace, Indian-Russian joint venture
  - BrahMos, a cruise missile developed under the program
  - BrahMos-II, second generation of the cruise missile
