= Trust Deed of Brahmo Sabha =

The modern religious philosophy of Brahmoism is based in part on the foundations of reformer Raja Ram Mohan Roy's humanitarian philosophy, as exemplified by the Trust Deed of Brahmo Sabha, known to Brahmos as the 1830 Brahmo Trust Deed.

== Brief history ==
On 20 August 1828 the first assembly of the Brahmo Sabha was held at Kolkata (Calcutta), India. This Sabha was convened by religious reformer Raja Ram Mohan Roy for his family and friends settled there. These were essentially informal meetings of Bengali Brahmins, open to all Brahmins, and there was no formal organisation or theology as such. On 8 January 1830 influential members of the closely related Kulin clan of Tagore (Thakur) and Roy (Vandopādhyāya) Zumeendar family mutually executed the Trust Deed of Brahmo Sabha for the first Adi Brahmo Samaj place of worship on Chitpore Road (now Rabindra Sarani), Kolkata, India with Ram Chandra Vidyabagish as first resident superintendent. In November 1830, Ram Mohan Roy left for England, leaving the Trust Deed as legacy for his successors.

In addition to being a legal document, the (Banian) Trust Deed of 1830 settles some basic principles of Brahmo Samaj

- a place of public meeting of all sorts and descriptions of people without distinction as shall behave and conduct themselves in an orderly sober religious and devout manner,

or,

- the worship and adoration of the Eternal Unsearchable and Immutable Being who is the Author and Preserver of the Universe, but not under or by any other name designation or title peculiarly used for and applied, to any particular being or beings by any man or set of men whatsoever,

and,

- that no graven image statue or sculpture, carving, painting, picture, portrait or the likeness of anything shall be admitted within the said messages building, land, tenements, hereditaments and premise,

and,

- that no sacrifice, offering, oblation of any kind or thing shall ever be permitted therein, and that no animal or living creature shall within or on the said message building, land, tenements, hereditaments and premises be deprived of life either for religious purposes or for food,

and,

- that no eating or drinking (except such as shall be necessary by any accident for the preservation of life) feasting or rioting be permitted therein, or thereon,

and,

- that in conducting the said worship and adoration, no object, animate or inanimate, that has been, or is, or shall hereafter become or be recognised as an object of worship by any man or set of men shall be reviled or slightingly or contemptuously spoken of or alluded to, either in preaching, prayer or in the hymns or other mode of worship that may be delivered or used in the said message or building,

and,

- that no sermon, preaching, discourse, prayer or hymn be delivered, made or used in such worship but such as have a tendency to the promotion of the contemplation of the Author and Preserver of the Universe, to the promotion of charity, morality, piety, benevolence, virtue and the strengthening the bonds of union between men of all religious persuasions and creeds,

and,

- also that a person of good repute and well known for his knowledge, piety and morality be employed by the said Trustees or the survivors or survivors of them or the heirs of such survivor or their or his assigns as a resident superintendent and for the purpose of superintending the worship so to be performed as in hereinbefore stated and expressed,

and,

- that such worship be performed daily or least as often as once in seven days.

== Analysis ==
The Trust Deed of 1830 is a complex legal document in archaic legal drafting for transfer of the property at Chitpur Road to the Trustees. This section will guide you through it.

=== Trustors ===
- Dwarkanath Tagore of Jorasankoe in the Town of Calcutta, Zumeendar,
- Kalleenath Roy Choudhury of Burranugar in the Zillah of Havelly in the suburbs of Calcutta, Zumeendar
- Prasanna Coomar Tagore of Pattoriaghatta in Calcutta, Zumeendar,
- Ram Chandra Vidyabagish of Simlah in Calcutta, Pundit, and
- Ram Mohan Roy of Manicktullah in Calcutta, aforesaid Zumeendar.

=== Trustees ===
- Boykontonath Roy of Burranugur in the Zillah of Havelly in the Suburbs of the Town of Calcutta, Zumeendar,
- Radapersaud Roy of Manicktullah in Calcutta, Zumeendar and
- Ramnath Tagore of Jorasankoe Calcutta.

=== Explanation of the parties ===
- Zumendeer – Zamindar – Large Landlords
- Names are listed in alphabetical order in the Deed so that there is no "distinction" between them.

== See also ==
- Adi Brahmo Samaj
- Bengali Renaissance
- Brahmo – for adherents
- Brahmoism – for Brahmo religion
- Brahmo Samaj – for community of Brahmoism
- History of Bengal
- Prarthana Samaj
- Sadharan Brahmo Samaj
- Tattwabodhini Patrika
