= Brahmo =

Follower of Brahmoism

Bengali Brahmos are those who adhere to Brahmoism, the philosophy of Brahmo Samaj which was founded by Raja Rammohan Roy. A recent publication describes the influence of Brahmos on India's development post-19th century as unparalleled.

== Distinction between Brahmo and Brahmo Samajist ==
One aspect of Brahmoism is recognition that not only explicit faith and worship makes for a Brahmo, but also genealogy, which is implicit. People with even a single Brahmo parent or a Brahmo guardian are treated as Brahmos until they absolutely renounce the Brahmo faith. This often causes tension within the Samaj, for example, when an offspring of a Brahmo follows atheism or another religious belief without renouncing Brahmoism formally. There are differing views between the Theist and Deist streams of Brahmoism on the retention of such people within the fold. Additionally, a Brahmo who opts not to subscribe to membership of a Brahmo Samaj remains a Brahmo but ceases to be a Brahmo Samajist.

== People associated with Brahmo Samaj ==
=== Ayathan ===
- Ayyathan Gopalan (1861-1948), Doctor, Social reformer of Kerala. Founder, Leader and propagandist of Brahmo Samaj (1893) in Kerala. Founder of Sugunavardhini movement (1900) and Depressed Classes Mission (1909) in Kerala.
- Ayyathan Janaki Ammal (1878-1945), Doctor, Surgeon, Brahmo, Social activist.
- Kallat Kousallya Ammal - wife to Ayathan Gopalan and a Brahmo, social activist.
- Dr. Mandhakini Bai - Brahmo, Social activist. (daughter in law of Ayathan Gopalan)

=== Banerjee ===
- Sasipada Banerji (1840–1924), Social reformer.
  - Sir Albion Rajkumar Banerjee, CSI, CIE (1871–1950), Diwan of Cochin.
- Amiya Charan Banerjee (1891–1968), Vice Chancellor of Allahabad University.
- Probha Banerji, first lady magistrate of India.
  - Kalyan Banerji, Deputy Managing Director of the State Bank of India.
  - Milon K. Banerji (1928–2010), Attorney General of India.
    - Gourab Banerji, Additional Solicitor General of India.

=== Chakrabarty ===
- Nikhil Chakravarty, Founder-Editor, Mainstream Weekly.
  - Sumit Chakravarty, Editor, Mainstream Weekly.
- Uma Shehanobis (née Chakrabarty), Principal, Patha Bhavan, Calcutta.

=== Chattopadhayay ===
- Aghorenath Chattopadhyay, Principal, Nizam's College, Hyderabad.
  - Sarojini Naidu (1879–1949), Politician.
    - Padmaja Naidu (1900–1975), Governor of West Bengal.
    - Leela Naidu (1940–2009), Artist.
  - Suhasini Chattopadhyay, Indian freedom fighter.
  - Virendranath Chattopadhyaya (1880–1937), Indian nationalist.
  - Harindranath Chattopadhyaya (1898–1990), Padma Bhushan, Member of Parliament, Vijayawada.
  - Kamaladevi Chattopadhyaya, Padma Vibhushan, Social reformer.
    - Krishna Chattopadhyay (1935–2009), Singer.

=== Bose ===
- Rajnarayan Basu, Writer and intellectual of the Bengal Renaissance.
  - Krishnadhan Ghosh (son-in-law of Rajnarayan Basu), Civil Surgeon, Pabna, Bengal.
    - Sri Aurobindo, Indian nationalist; vice principal of Baroda College.
- Girindrasekhar Bose (1887–1953), Psychoanalyst.

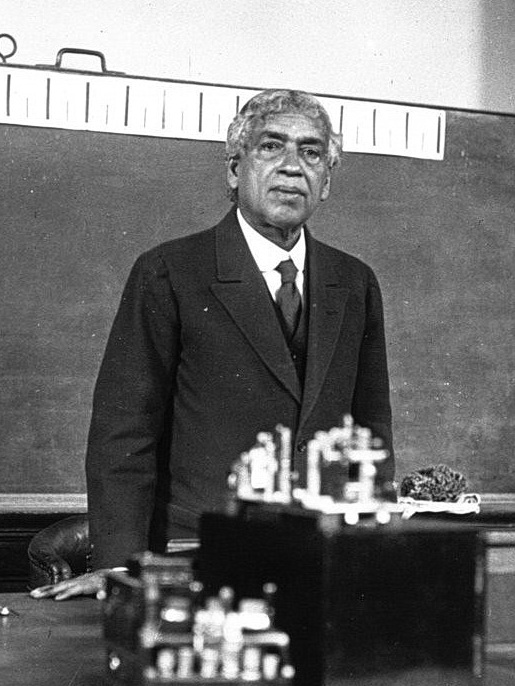
Jagadish Chandra Bose

- Sir Jagadish Chandra Bose (1858–1937), Polymath who was Professor of Physics, Presidency College, Calcutta.
- Lady Abala Bose (1864–1951), Social reformer who founded the Nari Sikhshya Samities.
  - Debendra Mohan Bose (1887–1975) (Sir J.C. Bose was his maternal uncle), Director, Bose Institute, Calcutta
- Anandamohan Bose (1847–1906) (brother-in-law of Sir J.C. Bose and paternal uncle of D.M. Bose), Co-founder of Indian National Association; first Indian Wrangler at Cambridge University.
- Rajsekhar Bose (1880–1960), Author

=== Das ===
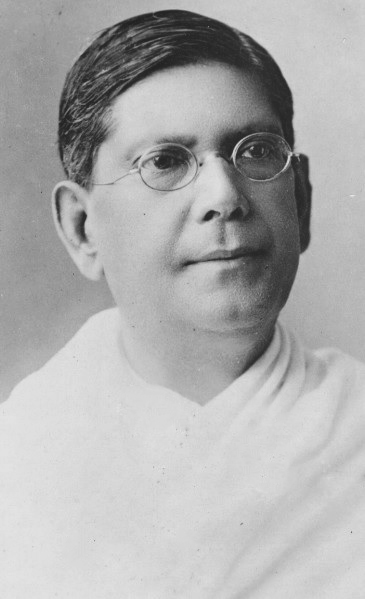
Chittaranjan Das

- Bhuban Mohan Das
  - Chittaranjan Das, Mayor of Calcutta.
  - Basanti Devi, Padma Vibhushan, Social reformer.
    - Siddhartha Shankar Ray (grandson), Chief Minister of West Bengal.
    - Justice Manjula Bose (granddaughter), Judge of the High Court of Calcutta.
    - Jaidip Mukherjea (grandson) (1942-), Sportsman.
- Durga Mohan Das (1841–1897), Social reformer.
  - Satish Ranjan Das (1870–1928), Law Member of the Viceroy's Executive Council; founder of Doon School.
    - Shomie Ranjan Das (1935-), Headmaster of Doon School, Mayo College and Lawrence School, Sanawar.
- Rakhal Chandra Das
  - Sudhi Ranjan Das, 5th Chief Justice of India.
    - Group Captain Suranjan Das
    - Anjana Sen (née Das)
    - Ashoke Kumar Sen, Law Minister of India.

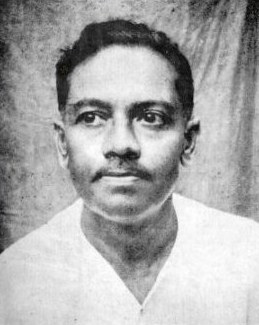
Jibanananda Das

- Kusumkumari Das, Social Worker.
  - Jibanananda Das, Poet.
    - Chidananda Dasgupta, Filmmaker.
- Beni Madhab Das (1866–1952), Social reformer.
  - Bina Das (1911–1986), Member, West Bengal Legislative Assembly, 1947–51.
- Arun Kumar Das, FRCS (Eng. & Edin.) (1924–2015), Orthopedist; Professor, NRS Medical College and Hospital, Calcutta.

=== Dey ===
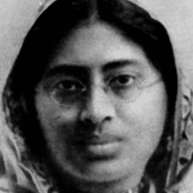
Saroj Nalini Dutt

- Brajendranath Dey, Esq., ICS (1852–1932), Barrister-at-Law (Middle Temple), Commissioner (Actg.) of Burdwan & Magistrate and Collector of Hooghly, Bengal.
  - Hem Nalini Mitra (nee Dey), m. Sashi Bhushan Mitra, FRCS, winner of Faraday Medal, Nationalist and founder of an insurance company
    - Prabha Bose m. Dharani Kumar Bose, Councilor, Calcutta Municipal Corporation, builder of MacKinnon and Mackenzie building.
      - Uma Bose (Hasi), eminent singer.
    - Sudhangshu Bhushan Mitra
      - Subrata Mitra, Padma Shri, Emeritus Professor, Satyajit Ray Film Studies Institute, Calcutta; cameraman of Pather Panchali, Teesri Kasam, New Delhi Times, etc.
    - Himangshu Bhushan Mitra, student of Imperial College, London, Deputy Chief Mechanical Engineer, Bengal Nagpur Railways; also served in Sudan.
  - Lady Niraj Nalini Ghosh (née Dey) m. Sir Sarat Kumar Ghosh, ICS, (1879-1963) Barrister-at-Law (Inner Temple), Chief Justice of Kashmir and Jaipur.
  - Naba Nalini Basu (nee Dey), m. Professor Satish Chandra Basu, I.E.S., Professor of Economics, Hooghly College, Chinsura, Hooghly, Bengal.
  - Saroj Nalini Dutt (née Dey), M.B.E., (1887–1925), Social reformer m. Gurusaday Dutta, Esq., ICS (1882-1941), Barrister-at-Law, (Gray's Inn), Secretary, Local Self-Government and Public Health, Government of Bengal.
  - Hemanta Kumar Dey, Esq., (1889-1967), Barrister-at-Law (Gray's Inn), Presidency Magistrate, Calcutta.
  - Prafulla Nalini Dey (née Dey) m. Lieutenant Colonel Dr Jyotish Chandra Dey, I.M.S., (1892-1962), 2nd Indian Principal of Calcutta Medical College.
  - Sarasi Nalini Datta (née Dey) m. Captain Paresh Chandra Datta (1893-1963), First Chief Medical Officer, B.R. Singh Memorial Hospital, Sealdah, Calcutta and Director, Public Health, Government of West Bengal.
    - Ranajit Datta (1925-2016), Chairman & Managing Director, Braithwaite, Burn and Jessop Ltd.
  - Major (Hon.) Basanta Kumar Dey (1897–1975), 2nd Indian Commercial Traffic Manager, Bengal Nagpur Railway.
    - Professor Barun Dey (1932–2013), Chairman, West Bengal Heritage Commission.
  - Nirmal Nalini Dutta (née Dey) m. Debprasad Dutta, Deputy Director, Public Health, Government of West Bengal (1898-1985).
    - Nandita Dutta (1935-2007), Founder-Principal, Patha Bhavan, Kolkata

=== Dutta ===
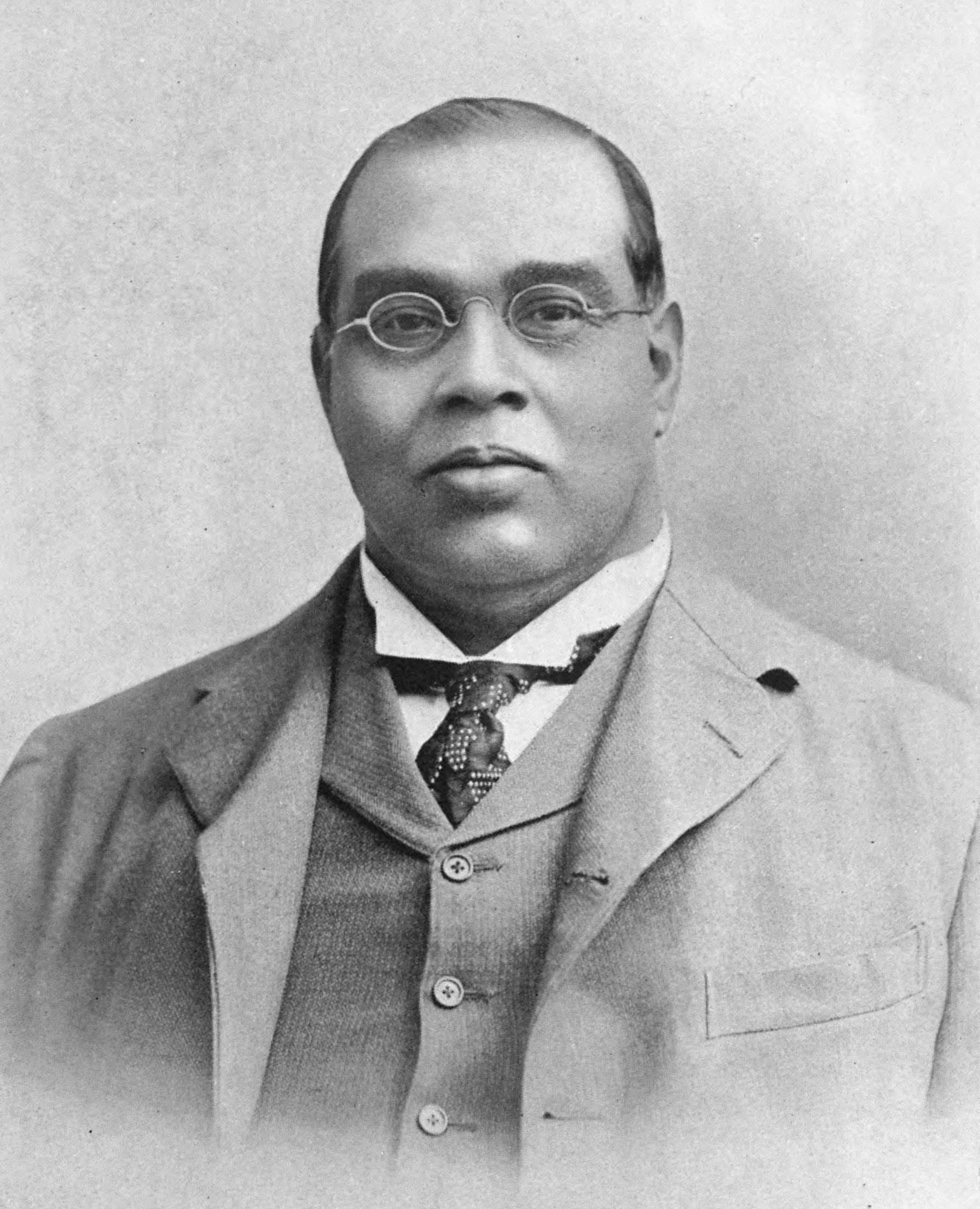
Romesh Chunder Dutt

- Romesh Chandra Dutta (1848–1908), C.I.E., Dewan of Baroda.
  - Jnanendranath Gupta, Esq., ICS (son-in-law of R.C. Dutt), Commissioner of Chittagong.
    - Sudhindranath Gupta, Esq., 1st Indian Commercial Traffic Manager, Bengal Nagpur Railway.
- Akshay Kumar Datta (1820–1886), Poet.
  - Satyendranath Dutta (1882–1922), Poet.

=== Ganguly ===
- Dwarkanath Ganguly (1844–1898), Social reformer.
- Kadambini Ganguly (1861–1923), First female medical graduate in South Asia.

=== Goswami ===
- Bijoy Krishna Goswami (1841–1899), Social reformer, Brahmo Acharya

=== Gupta ===
- Behari Lal Gupta, ICS, (1849–1916), Dewan of Baroda.
  - Satish Chandra Gupta, IAAS, Accountant General of India in Simla and Secretary to the Central Legislative Assembly
    - Ranjit Gupta, ICS, Chief Secretary, West Bengal.
    - Kanwarani Reva (Lady Dalip Singh), m. Sardar Sir Dalip Singh, son of Raja Harnam Singh and grandson of Maharaja Randhar Singh of Kapurthala
    - Indrajit Gupta (1919–2001), Home Minister of India (1996–98).
      - Sunanda K. Datta-Ray (1937-), Journalist.
- Sir Krishna Govinda Gupta, ICS, Member of the Secretary of States Council in London.
  - Atul Prasad Sen, Barrister-at-Law, Lawyer, composer and singer.

=== Jana ===
- Madhusudan Jana, doctor, journalist, teacher and social worker, founder of the highly acclaimed Nihar Patrika, one of the most prominent figures of Contai, Purba Medinipur.
  - Jatindra Nath Jana, teacher
    - Nitindra Nath Jana, journalist, writer and author

=== Mahalanobis ===
- Gurucharan Mahalanobis, President and Treasurer of Brahmo Samaj.
- Subodh Chandra Mahalanobis, Founder of the Physiology Department of Presidency College, Calcutta; 1st Indian Head of Department of Physiology, University of Cardiff.
- Prabodh Chandra Mahalanobis.
  - Prasanta Chandra Mahalanobis, F.R.S., pioneer statistician and teacher of statistics, Member, 1st Planning Commission of India.

=== Mitra ===
- Braja Sundar Mitra, Excise Collector, Calcutta.
    - Deba Prasad Mitra (1902–1978), Pathologist.
- Peary Chand Mitra (1814–1883), Deputy Librarian, Calcutta Public Library.
- Kishori Chand Mitra (1822–1873), Police Magistrate.

=== Moitra ===
- Anupam Chandra Moitra, Geologist.
  - Anil Kumar Moitra, Indian Iron and Steel Company Ltd.

=== Mukherjee ===
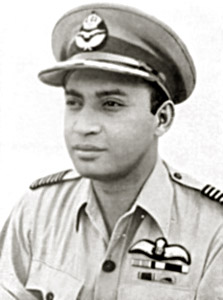
Subroto Mukherjee

- Nibaran Chandra Mukherjee, Social reformer.
  - Satish Chandra Mukherjee (1865–1948), Educationist.
    - Renuka Ray (née Mukherjee) (1904–1997), Politician.
    - Subroto Mukerjee (1911–1960), First Chief of Air Staff of the Indian Air Force.
    - Prasanta Mukherjee, Chairman, Railway Board.

=== Nag Chaudhuri ===
- Basanti Dulal Nag Chaudhuri, Physicist; Vice Chancellor, Jawaharlal Nehru University, New Delhi.

=== Pal ===
- Bipin Chandra Pal (1858–1932), Indian nationalist leader.
  - Niranjan Pal (1889–1959), Playwright, screenwriter and director.
    - Colin Pal (1923–2005), Film director.
      - Deep Pal (1953-), Cinematographer.
  - S. K. Dey (son-in-law), ICS, Union Minister for Panchayati Raj.

=== Pal Chowdhury ===
- Bipradas Pal Chowdhury, Industrialist
  - Amiyanarayan Pal Chowdhury, Zamindar of Maheshganj m. Ila Pal Choudhury, Member of Parliament, Nabadwip, 1957.
    - Amitabha Palchaudhuri, Chairman, Bengal National Chamber of Commerce and Industry (BNCCI).
    - Anik Palchaudhuri, Vice Chairman and Managing Director, Gulma Mohorgong Tea Estate.

=== Ray/Roy ===
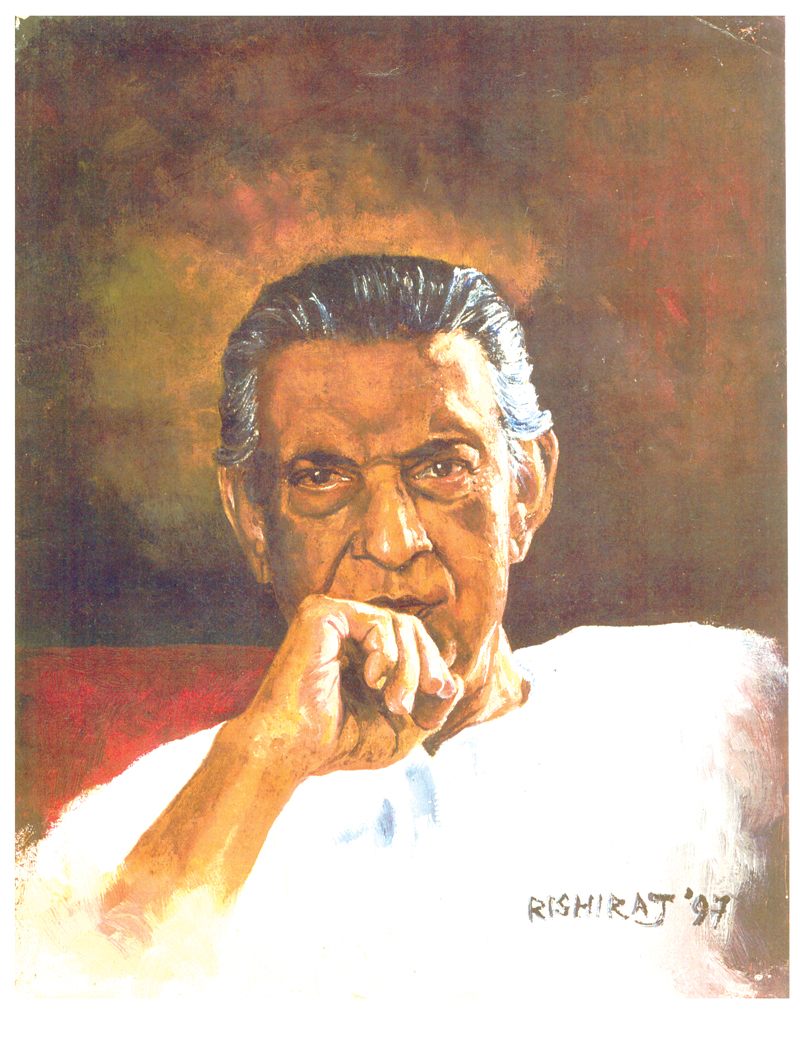
Satyajit Ray

- Saradaranjan Ray, Principal, Metropolitan Institution (later Vidyasagar College)
- Upendrakishore Ray Chowdhury (Kamadaranjan Ray) (1863–1915), Scholar and entrepreneur.
  - Sukumar Ray (1887–1923), Writer.
    - Satyajit Ray (1921–1992), Film-maker, Bharat Ratna and Oscar Award for Lifetime Achievement (1992)
    - Bijoya Ray (1917–2015),
      - Sandip Ray (1953-), Film-maker.
- Pramadaranjan Ray, Office of the Surveyor General of India
  - Leela Majumdar (1908–2007), Author.
- Pratap Chandra Roy
  - Bidhan Chandra Roy, 2nd Chief Minister of West Bengal.
    - Subimal Roy, Judge of the Supreme Court of India.
- Prasanna Kumar Roy (1849–1932), Educationist.
- Sarala Roy (1859–1946), Educationist.
  - Charulata Mukherjee (née Roy), Social reformer.

=== Sanyal ===
- Trailokyanath Sanyal (1848–1950), Social reformer.
  - Aruna Asaf Ali (née Ganguly), Indian freedom fighter and prominent leader of the Quit India Movement.
  - Purmina Banerjee (née Ganguly), Member, Indian Constituent Assembly.

=== Sarkar ===
- Susobhan Sarkar (1900–1982), Professor of History, Presidency College, Calcutta.
  - Sumit Sarkar (1939-), Professor of History, Delhi University.

=== Sen ===
- Bhupati Mohan Sen, Wrangler, Smith's Prize recipient, 2nd Indian Principal of Presidency College, Calcutta, (son-in-law of Sir Nilratan Sircar)
  - Monishi Mohan Sen (1920-2019), ICS Officer
  - Subrata Kumar Sen (1924–2016), MIT Graduate, Electrical Engineering

Sen family

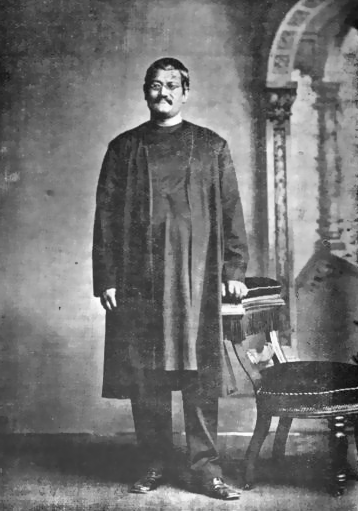
Keshab Chandra Sen

- Keshub Chandra Sen (1838–1884), Religious reformer & founder of the Nababidhan Brahmo Samaj.
  - Suniti Devi (1864–1932), Maharani of Coochbehar & founder of Sammilan Brahmo Samaj.
  - Sucharu Devi (1874–1961), Maharani of Mayurbhanj.
  - Saral Chandra Sen, Barrister-at-Law
    - Sunit Chandra Sen, Collector, Calcutta Municipal Corporation.
    - Benita Roy, Politician.
    - Sadhana Bose, Artist.
    - Nilina Singh, Singer.
    - Pradip Chandra Sen, Deputy Managing Director, Mackinnon Mackenzie.
  - Pramathalal Sen (1866–1930) (nephew of Keshub Chandra Sen), Social reformer.
  - Benoyendranath Sen (1868–1913) (nephew of Keshub Chandra Sen), Social reformer and leader of the New Dispensation.
- Abhijit Sen, Proprietor, Sen and Pandit Co. Ltd.

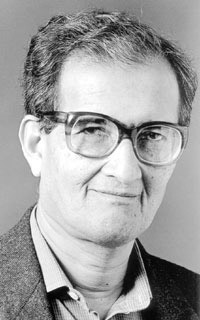
Amartya Kumar Sen

- Kshitimohan Sen (1880–1960), 2nd Vice Chancellor of Visva Bharati, Santiniketan.
  - Ashutosh Sen (son-in-law), Chairman, West Bengal Public Service Commission.
    - Amartya Sen (1933-), 1st Asian Master of Trinity College, Cambridge; Nobel Laureate in Economics.
- Barrister Kumud Nath Sen
  - P.K. Sengupta, Income Tax Commissioner.
  - K.P. Sen, Post-Master General, Eastern India.
  - Malati Choudhury (née Sen), Social Worker.
- Nitish Chandra Sen, Mayor of Calcutta.
- Kamini Roy (née Sen) (1864–1933), Social reformer and poet.

=== Sinha ===
Baron Sinha family

- Satyendra Prasanno Sinha, 1st Baron Sinha (1863–1923), Politician.
  - Rt. Honourable Sushil Kumar Sinha, ICS.
  - Romola Sinha (1913–2010), Social reformer.
  - Major N.P. Sen, IMS.
    - Mohit Sen (grandson) (1929–2003), Politician.

=== Tagore ===
Tagore family

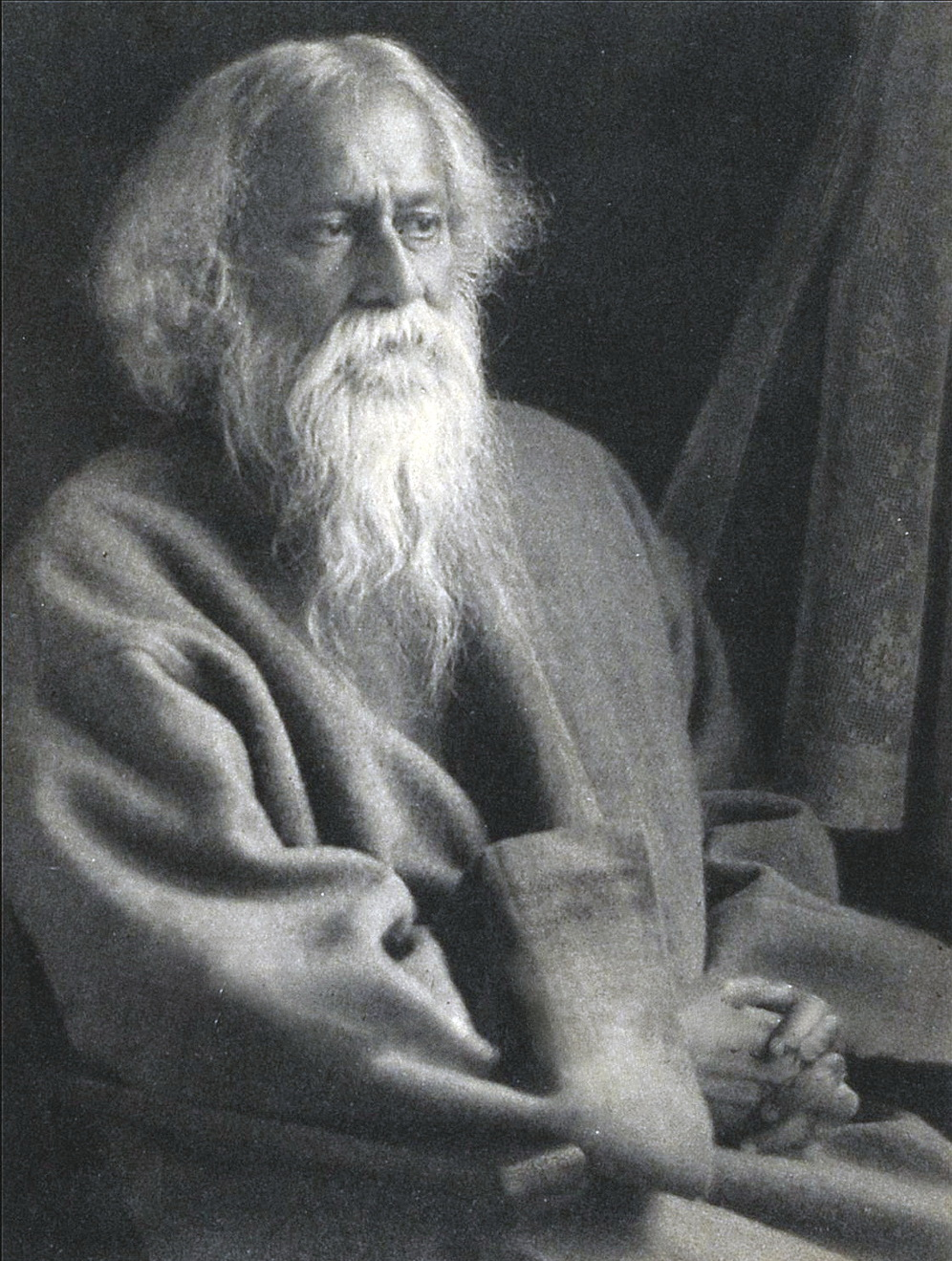
Rabindranath Tagore

- Debendranath Tagore (1817–1905), Social reformer.
  - Satyendranath Tagore (1842–1923), First Indian ICS officer, (1863).
  - Jnanadanandini Devi (1850–1941), Social reformer.
    - Indira Devi Chaudhurani, Upacharya, Visva Bharati, Santiniketan.
    - Surendranath Tagore, Author.
      - Subirendranath Tagore
        - Supriyo Tagore, Principal, Patha Bhavana, Santiniketan.
  - Hemendranath Tagore (1844–1884), Religious savant, founder of Adi Dharm development of Brahmoism.
  - Rabindranath Tagore (1861–1941), Bengali poet and Nobel laureate in Literature
- Swarnakumari Devi (1855–1932), Noted Bengali poet, novelist, musician and social worker.

=== Others ===
- Sir Nilratan Sircar (1861–1943), famous doctor, swadeshi entrepreneur, educationist, philanthropist, Vice-Chancellor of Calcutta University
- Anil Kumar Gain, Indian mathematician, scientist from Cambridge University and founder of Vidyasagar University
- Rai Sahib Bipin Bihari Sasmal, prominent Zamindar of Midnapore district, politician, famous educationist, established the Contai Chandramani Brahmo Girls' School
- Heramba Chandra Maitra, famous educationist after whom Heramba Chandra College is named
- Sir Nalini Ranjan Chatterjee, Judge of the High Court of Calcutta.
- Kalinath Bose, first Indian Superintendent of Police.
- Uma Bose (1921–1942), Singer.
- Kiran Chandra De, ICS, Commissioner, Chittagong.
- Sib Chandra Deb, Deputy Collector in Bengal.
- Umesh Chandra Dutta, Founder of the Harinavi Brahmo Samaj.
- Sucheta Kriplani, First woman Chief Minister of an Indian State.
- Subrata Mitra (1931–2001), Padma Shri, Cameraman; Emeritus Professor, Satyajit Ray Film and Television Institute, Calcutta.
- Sir Brojendra Lal Mitter, Advocate General of Bengal.
- Harish Chandra Mukherjee, Journalist.
- Girish Chandra Sen, Translated the Quran into Bengali.
- Sir Nripendra Nath Sircar, Advocate General of Bengal.
- Shree Suresh Chandra Roy, Padma Bhushan, Sheriff of Calcutta (1957, 1958).
- Sivanath Sastri (1847-1919), Poet and Social Reformer.

== See also ==
- Brahmo Dharma
- Prarthana Samaj
- Tattwabodhini Patrika
- Trust Deed of Brahmo Sabha
