= Kalicharan Brahma =

Indian social reformer (1860–1938)

Gurudev Kalicharan Brahma
- Born: 18 April 1860; Kajigami, Assam, India
- Died: 8 May 1938 (aged 78); Kajigami, Assam, India
- Other names: Mech Gandhi, Gurudev
- Occupation: Social reformer
- Spouse: Khwmsri Brahma Uphasi Brahma
- Children: 7 (4 daughter, 3 Sons)
- Parent: Khoularam Mech (father) Randini Mech (mother)

Gurudev Kalicharan Brahma (1860–1938), originally Kalicharan Mech, was a 20th-century social and religious reformer of Bodo society. He attained diksha in a new religion called Brahmo Dharma / Brahmoism Adi Brahmo Samaj in Calcutta around 1906, and is reverentially called Gurudev or Guru Brahma by the Bodo people of lower plains of Assam along the Brahmaputra valley. Other Assamese Brahmos of the time include Gunabhiram Barua and Swarnalata Devi of the same faction, all of whom agitated against Colonialist Imperialism of any kind. The followers of this group are locally known as Brahmas in tribute to their religion and the holy river of which they are sons. He was the founder of Boro Chhatra Sanmilanni (All Bodo Students Union).

== Early life ==
Kalicharan was born on 18 April 1860, at Kajigaon village in Dhubri district, Assam state of India. His father was Khoularam Mech, his mother was Randini Mech. Khoularam was a timber merchant and one of the rich persons of those days. As Kalicharan grew up he became intelligent, honest and thoughtful. He became a great religious preacher of Brahma faith and brought over revolutionary changes in Bodo society by his continuous and sustained programme of reformation against the prevailing Bathou worship. "All the educated and enlightened section of the Bodo community including Rup Nath Brahma lent their all-round efforts in his reformatory programme, religious propagation through spread of education and political activism."

== Education ==
His pre-primary education in his home with a private tutor Birnarayan Mech. Later he joint in Tipkai primary school. After passing the primary school he joined in Puthimari M. V. School. But when he got in class five his father died. Kalicharan had to come back to home although he did not want to give up the school.

== Work ==
By the end of the 19th century and the early part of the 20th century, the Bodo Society was also suffering from religious, moral and political degradation. The young Kalicharan Brahma could perceive the deplorable condition of the Bodos who were "bogged down with evil social practices" due to which the other commitments despised them. The Bodos who were one of the original inhabitants of the Brahmaputra valley were going through an identity crisis like the other marginalised indigenous Assamese communities. They had developed an inferiority complex. They were rapidly relinquishing their customs and traditions. The Bodo Society was disintegrating with the increase in the number of conversion to other religions. Many educated and affluent Bodos had begun to see their traditional beliefs and customs as stumbling blocks to modernization and human achievement.

Kalicharan realized that the Bodo Society would have to be reformed. "He was filled with anguish and regret to see that the Bodos, although being followers of the Bathou religion were so only on a very superficial level. They showed little inclination in obeying the principle or guidelines set down by the religion. The worship of many gods and goddesses, whose number were only on the increase, was a clear indication that the people had moved away from their faith." They had become addicted to jou, rice beer and developed bad social habits. The various social evils were sapping the vitality of the Bodo Society.

Kalicharan felt that the identity and unity of the people could be preserved only though a change in their society and religion. In 1905, he came across the Sarnitya Kriya written by Mohini Mohan Chattopadhay. The book contained the teaching of Swami Sibnarayan Paramahansa. Kalicharan became convinced that the adoption of the Brahma religion would be able to guide the Bodos towards progress and development and put a stop to the religious conversions. Thus at the age of 39, he got ordained into the folds of Brahmaism by Swami Sibnarayan at his residence in Kolkata. He returned to his native village with a determination to spread the religion among the Bodos. According to Bidyasagar Narzary and Malabika Mitra's Journey Towards Enlightenment "The basic ideology of Brahmaism on which the religion was based was that there was only one God. In Brahma religion this God is worshipped in the form of fire is of primordial importance". "Fire is Brahma and Brahma gives life to the entire Earth and all its beings. Brahma is Universal, endless and all encompassing. Where there is Brahma, there can be found Satya or Truth."

== Death ==
He died on 8 May 1938 in his village at the age of 78.

== Bibliography ==
- Banerjee, Dipankar (2006). Brahmo Samaj and North-East India. Anamika Publishers & Distributors. ISBN 978-81-7975-176-3.
