= Nibaran Chandra Mukherjee =

Brahmo reformer in India

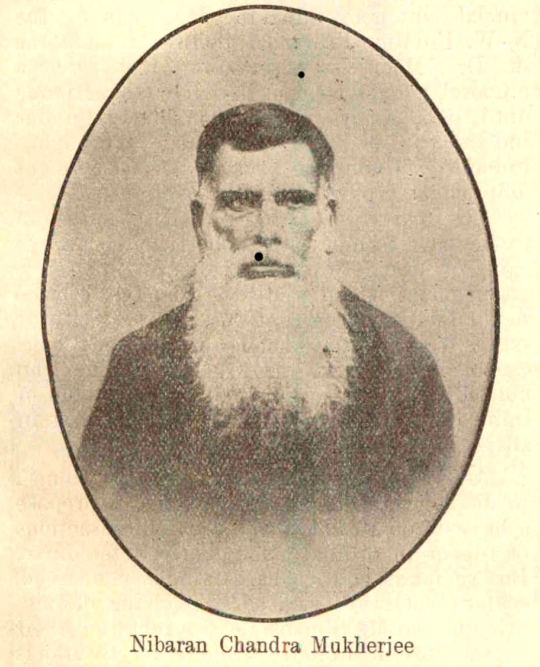

Nibaran Chandra Mukherjee (Nibaron Chôndro Mukharji) was a Brahmo reformer in India during the 19th century.

In the History of the Brahmo Samaj Sivanath Sastri wrote,

“The advent of Babu Nibaran Chandra Mukherjee, whose name has been mentioned in connection with progressive Brahmoism in Calcutta, during the Sangat Sabha days of 1865-66, brought a tower of strength to the Brahmo cause at Bhagalpur. He took it up in right earnest and has borne aloft the banner since then, piloting the movement through various vicissitudes of fortune. Others have come and gone but he remains there true to the convictions formed in early youth. During the period of the Cooch Behar marriage controversy the Bhagalpur Samaj kept close to Keshub Chunder Sen’s section of the church, without however shutting its doors to workers of the other section.”
