= Nibaran =

Nibaran may refer to

- Nibaran Chandra Laskar, Indian Politician
- Nibaran Chandra Mukherjee, Indian reformer
- Dukhulal Nibaran Chandra College, located in Murshidabad
