= Deba Prasad Mitra =

Indian clinical pathologist

- Born: 29 December 1902; Cuttack
- Died: 8 February 1978 (aged 75); Kolkata
- Occupation: Doctor

Deba Prasad Mitra (29 December 1902 – 8 February 1978), son of Jyotirindraprasad Mitra (1869–1918), was a renowned clinical pathologist and religious and social worker connected with the Brahmo Samaj. His life and work were greatly inspired and stimulated by the lives of his grandfather Braja Sundar Mitra (1820–1875), the founder of the East Bengal Brahmo Samaj at Dhaka (now in Bangladesh) and an inaugurator of the New Age in Dhaka and Eastern Bengal as a whole, and also his mother's grandfather Sib Chandra Deb (1811–1890), a pupil of Henry Louis Vivian Derozio at the Hindu College, the Founder-Secretary of the Sadharan Brahmo Samaj, Kolkata, and pioneer of the modernization of his native village Konnagar, a few kilometers from Kolkata. Devaprasad's father Jyotirindraprasad was a qualified advocate and practiced law for some time, but when he found that one had to resort to falsehood for success in the legal profession, he gave it up and joined the service of the estate of the Tripura Native State at Comilla (now in Bangladesh).

== Early life ==
He spent his boyhood at Comilla and moved to Kolkata when he lost his father. A brilliant student he passed his Matriculation from Hare School and I.Sc. from Presidency College, Calcutta with flying colours. He studied in Calcutta Medical College from 1921 to 1927, where he won many prizes including gold and silver medals as well as the Abdul Ghani Scholarship for being the best all-round student of his class. He passed M.B. in 1927. During the period Students' Club was established in Calcutta Medical College and he was its president.

== Professional life ==
On completion of his medical education in India, he could have gone abroad to obtain foreign qualifications and on return establish a large practice in Kolkata or join Government service, and earn much money. A patriot at heart, he had vowed at the beginning of his working life not to go for a foreign qualification or serve under a foreign Government. He, along with three close friends, established the Calcutta Bacteriological Institute in 1928, where many poor patients used to get their investigations done free of cost. He chose pathology instead of private practice as physician in order to have more time for social work. The laboratory was one of the first in Kolkata and created a very good name for it in the city.

== The Brahmo Samaj ==
His heart was with the Brahmo Samaj. From the mid-1930s till his death in 1978, he was intimately connected with all activities of the Samaj, including conducting services as a minister of the Samaj, work as assistant secretary, secretary, treasurer and finally president of the Sadharan Brahmo Samaj, and work in the different social welfare organizations of the Samaj. His untiring services on behalf of the Samaj during the Midnapore floods of 1942, the great Bengal famine of 1943 and influx of refugees from East Pakistan prior to and after the partition of India, along with the establishment of the Brahmo Samaj Relief Mission, the Brahmo Samaj Balya Bhavan, and the Brahmo Samaj Mahila Bhavan made his name ever memorable in the annals of the Brahmo Samaj. As the President of the Brahmo Balika Shikshalaya, the Brahmo Boys' School, and the Sadharan Brahmo Samaj Library as well as his valuable services in the Brahmo Samaj Educational Society showed his keen interest in the cause of education. His universal love irrespective of caste, creed or colour endeared him to all. His contact with all the sections of the Brahmo Samaj and similar movements abroad made his name familiar to a wide extent.
