= Subimal Chandra Roy =

Indian judge (1912–1971)

Hon'ble Justice Subimal Chandra Roy

Judge of Supreme Court of India
- In office 19 July 1971 – 12 November 1971
- Nominated by: Sarv Mittra Sikri
- Appointed by: V. V. Giri

Personal details
- Born: 29 May 1912
- Died: 12 November 1971 (aged 59)
- Education: B.A. and LL.B
- Alma mater: University of Calcutta; University College London; Lincoln's Inn

Subimal Chandra Roy (29 May 1912 – 12 November 1971) was an Indian jurist who served on the Supreme Court of India.

== Early life and education ==
Roy was born on 29 May 1912. He was educated at the Presidency College, and the Scottish Church College, both within the University of Calcutta during 1928 and 1932. Thereafter he studied at the University College London from 1932 to 1935, and subsequently studied at the Lincoln's Inn from 1936 to 1937, from where he passed his Barrister-at-Law examination in January 1937.

== Career ==
He started out by practising as an advocate of the Calcutta High Court from 1937 to June 1971. He was for many years, Senior Counsel, of the Government of India in the Calcutta High Court. He was one of the first three original side practitioners to be designated Senior Advocates under s.16(2) of the Advocates Act in 1968. For many years a trustee of the Deshbandhu Memorial Trust and many other Trusts. He served as judge of the Supreme Court of India from 19 July 1971 to 12 November 1971. He was the second to be appointed as judge of the Supreme Court directly from the bar.

He died on 12 November 1971, though he had to attain retirement as judge of the Supreme Court on 28 May 1977. His unexpected death made him the shortest serving judge on the bench of Supreme Court of India serving only for 116 days before passing away.

== Awards ==
- Buchanan, Prizeman
- Certificate of Honour by the Council of Legal Education
- Langdon Medal
