= Bengal Renaissance =

Cultural period of the 1800s to the 1930s in the Bengal region

The Bengal Renaissance (Bengali: বাংলার নবজাগরণ, romanized: Baṅlar Nôbôjagôrôṇ), also known as the Bengali Renaissance, was a cultural, social, intellectual, and artistic movement that took place in the Bengal region of the British Raj, from the late 18th century to the early 20th century. Historians have traced the beginnings of the movement to the victory of the British East India Company at the 1757 Battle of Plassey, as well as the works of reformer Raja Rammohan Roy, considered the "Father of the Indian Renaissance," born in 1772. Nitish Sengupta stated that the movement "can be said to have ... ended with Rabindranath Tagore," Asia's first Nobel laureate.

For almost two centuries, the Bengal Renaissance saw the radical transformation of Indian society, and its ideas have been attributed to the rise of Indian anticolonialist and nationalist thought and activity during this period. The philosophical basis of the movement was its unique version of liberalism and modernity. According to Sumit Sarkar, the pioneers and works of this period were revered and regarded with nostalgia throughout the 19th and 20th centuries; however, due to a new focus on its colonialist origins, a more critical view emerged in the 1970s.

The Bengali Renaissance was predominantly led by Bengali Hindus, who at the time were socially and economically more affluent in colonial Bengal, and therefore better placed for higher education as a community. Well-known figures include the social reformer Raja Rammohan Roy, philanthropist Rani Rashmoni, poet Rabindranath Tagore, and the physicist Jagdish Chandra Bose.

== Background ==
The Bengal Renaissance was a movement marked by a sociopolitical awakening across the arts, literature, music, philosophy, religion, science, and other spheres of intellectual pursuit. The movement questioned the existing customs and rituals in Indian society – most notably, the caste system, and the practice of sati, idolatry – as well as the role of religion and colonial governance. In turn, the Bengal Renaissance advocated for societal reform – the kind that adhered to secularist, humanist, and modernist ideals. From Rabindranath Tagore to Satyendra Nath Bose, the movement saw the emergence of important figures whose contributions still influence cultural and intellectual works today.

Although the Bengal Renaissance was led and dominated by upper caste Hindus, Bengali Muslims played a transformative role in the movement, as well as the shaping of colonial and postcolonial Indian society. Examples of Bengali Muslim renaissance men and women include Kazi Nazrul Islam, Ubaidullah Al Ubaidi Suhrawardy, and Rokeya Sakhawat Hussain. When it came to cultural and religious reform, the Freedom of Intellect Movement was established in 1926 to challenge the social customs and dogmas in Bengali Muslim society.

From the mid-eighteenth century, the Bengal Province, and more specifically, its capital city of Calcutta, was the centre of British power in India. The region was the base for British imperial rule until the capital was moved to Delhi in 1911. Prior to Crown control, British power was in the hands of the East India Company, which, in the course of time, became increasingly profitable and influential politically, establishing diplomatic relations with local rulers as well as building armies to protect its own interests.

During this time, partly through the 1757 Battle of Plassey against the Nawab of Bengal and his French allies, and in part through the fall of the Mughal Empire, the company was able to acquire extensive territory in the Bengal and Ganges basin. The expense of these wars, however, threatened the company's financial situation, and the Regulating Act 1773 was passed to stabilise the EIC as well as subject it to some parliamentary control. Further legislation over the next several decades progressively brought about tighter controls over the company, but the Indian Rebellion of 1857 forced the British parliament to pass the Government of India Act 1858, which saw the liquidation of the EIC and the transfer of power to the British Crown.

== Origins ==
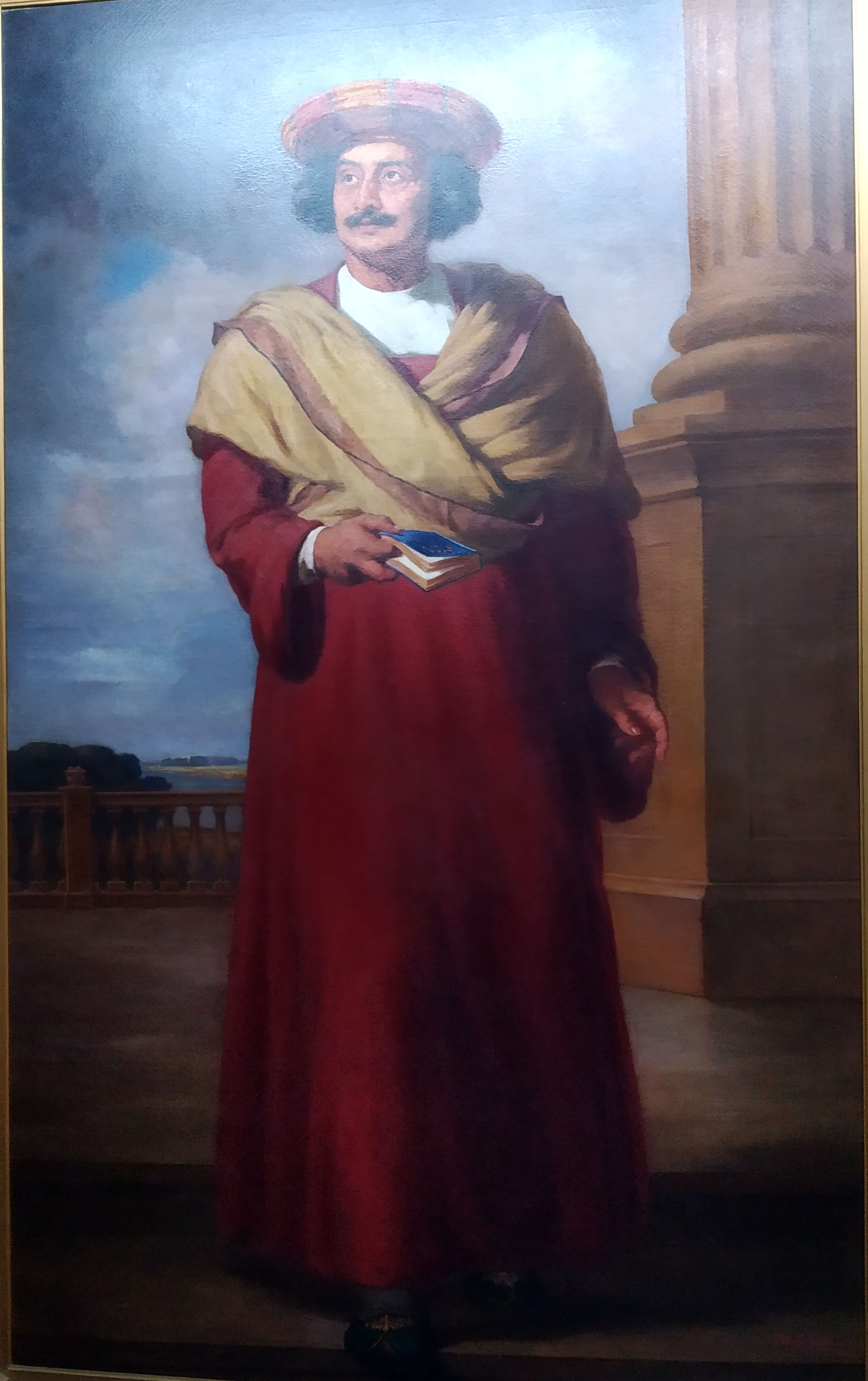
Ram Mohan Roy is considered the Father of the Bengali Renaissance

The Bengali Renaissance originated in the Bengal Presidency of the British Indian Empire, but more specifically, in its capital city of Kolkata, then known as Calcutta. This colonial metropolis was the first non-Western city to use British methods of teaching in their school system. In 1817, the urban elite led by Raja Ram Mohan Roy cofounded the Hindu or Presidency College in Kolkata (now known as the Presidency University), the only European-style institution of higher learning in Asia at the time. The city was also home to a public library, the Imperial Library, now the National Library of India, and newspapers and books were being published regularly in both Bengali and English. "Print language and literature played a vital role in shaping ideas and identities in colonial Bengal from the 18th century onwards," writes Anindita Ghosh, continuing that "... commercial print cultures that emanated from numerous cheap presses in Calcutta and its suburbs disseminated wide-ranging literary preferences that afforded a space to different sections of the Bengali middle classes to voice their own distinctive concerns."

The Bengal Province was the base for British East India Company rule until the overthrow of the Nawab of Bengal at the Battle of Plassey in 1757, which marked the Crown's consolidation of power in India. Many postcolonial historians source the origins of the Bengal Renaissance to these events, arguing that the movement was both a reaction to the violence and exploitation by the British Raj, as well as a product of the Empire's promotion of English education in the region as part of its "civilising missions". For instance, Sivanath Sastri notes that Charles Grant, a British politician influential in Indian affairs who also served as Chairman of the East India Company, "moved 'that a thorough education be given to the different races inhabiting the country, [and] that the Gospel be preached to them ... '". Moreover, Arabinda Poddar contends that the English education of Bengalis was intended to create "mere political slaves," arguing that "the civilising role of English education, stressed the need of creating a class of Anglophiles who would have a somewhat in-between existence between the rulers and the ruled."

Other historians cite the works of Raja Rammohun Roy as the start of the Bengal Renaissance. By 1829, Roy co-founded the Brahmo Sabha movement, which was later renamed the Brahmo Samaj by Debendranath Tagore. It was an influential socioreligious reform movement that made significant contributions to the renaissance, as well as the makings of modern Indian society.

== Education ==
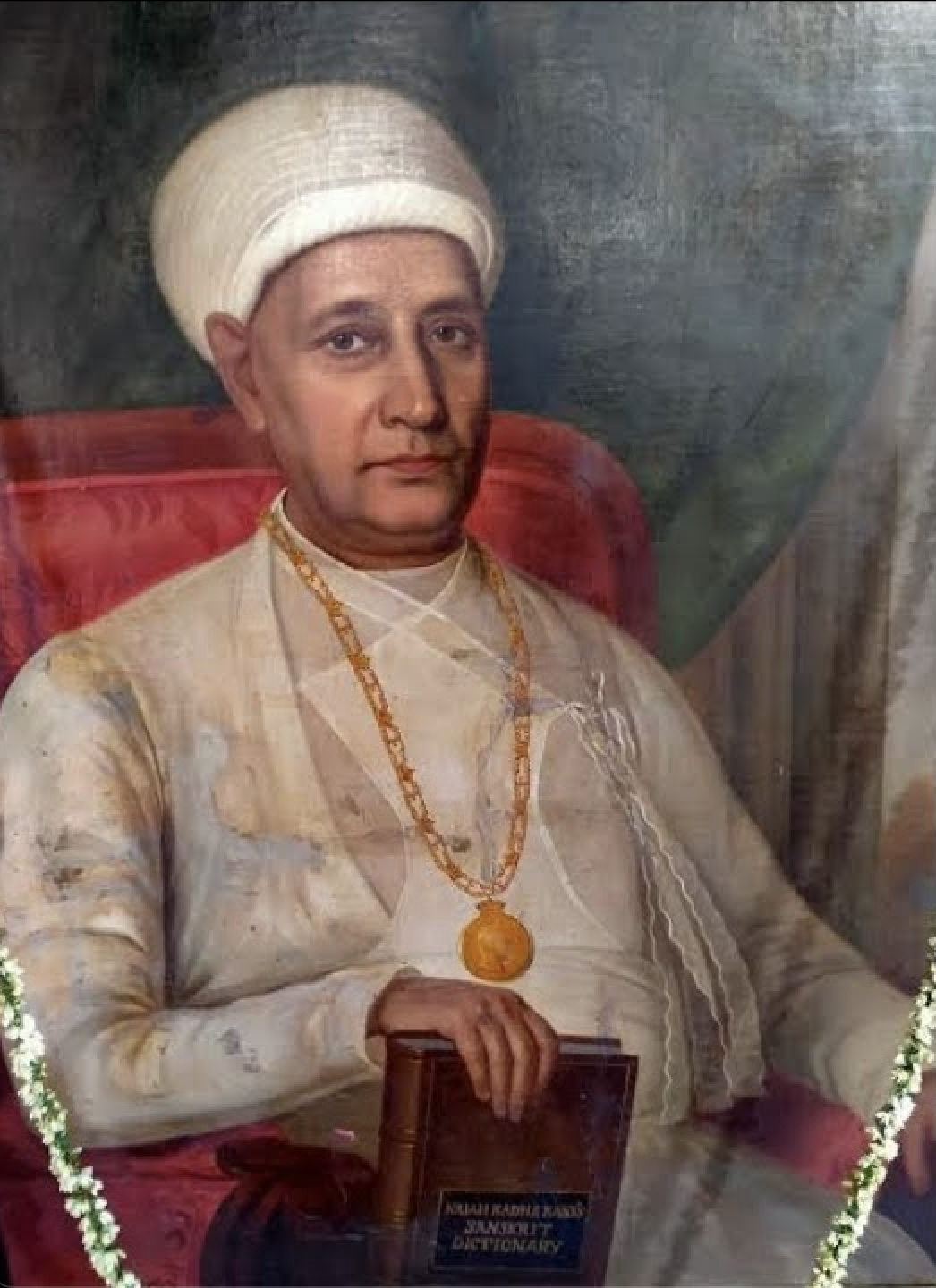
Radhakanta Deb was a prominent Indian scholar and social reformer of the early nineteenth century

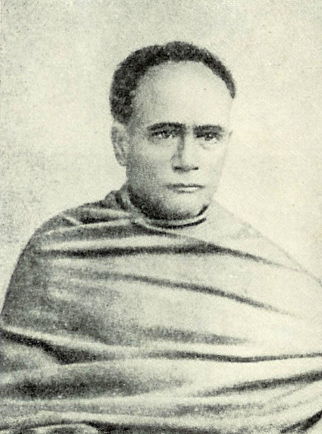
Ishwar Chandra Vidyasagar was a prominent Indian educator and social reformer of the nineteenth century

Among the many changes brought about by the Bengal Renaissance in India was the development of education, both in the Bengali language and in English. Colonial provisions at the time consisted mainly of village schools teaching literacy and numeracy, Arabic and Islamic studies being taught to Muslims in madrasas, and tols, where pandits instructed Sanskrit texts to Brahmins, which were supported by endowments. These institutions were exclusively male, and in the rare cases where girls could get an education, it was in the home. The work of Christian missions also had more of an influence on Indian students than the initiatives of the government. While the East India Company Act 1813 (the Charter Act) allotted 100,000 rupees from the government's surplus to be "applied to the revival and improvement of literature, and the encouragement of the learned natives of India, and for the introduction and promotion of a knowledge of the sciences," it did not lead to any coherent provision of public education.

According to Dermot Killingley, the surplus mentioned in this Charter Act was "an aspiration, not a budget item," and even if the money had been provided for, there was uncertainty about how it should be spent. Recurring questions arose over whether to invest in a few advanced institutions or to promote widespread elementary education, what language to use, and particularly whether to support traditional methods of learning in India, which had declined due to the loss of patronage, or to introduce a new system based on Western education. Rammohan Roy contributed to this last debate by writing to the Governor-General in 1823, expressing his opposition to the establishment of a Sanskrit College that would foster traditional learning and advocating for Western scientific education; this effort failed without effect. Missionaries began teaching young women in 1816, but a systematic education policy was not established until 1854. However, Sengupta and Purkayastha point out that even during the 1860s and 1870s, "the project of female education was wholly tied to the purpose of enabling women to better discharge their domestic duties."

Despite the East India Company's initial hostility to missionaries, the colonial government later saw the advantages of their contribution to educating and training the local population. This was especially because, as Killingley noted, "in the innovations of the early nineteenth century, government initiative had less impact than the work of Christian missions, and of individuals ... who responded to the demand for literacy, numeracy and related skills created by growing commercial and administrative activity." In 1800, the Baptist Missionary Society established a centre in Srirampur, West Bengal, from which it ran a network of schools that taught literacy, mathematics, physics, geography, and other so-called "useful knowledge." Other missionary societies followed soon after, working along similar lines. These missionaries, who were largely dependent on local, indigenous teachers and families, and the colonial government, which sometimes supported them with grants, were also cautious about introducing Christian teachings or the Bible.

Education was also believed to be necessary in reversing the apparent moral decline many colonial administrators saw in Bengal society. To give an example, a British judge in Bengal recommended the London Missionary Society's schools "for the dissemination of morality and general improvement of society among natives of all persuasion without interfering with their religious prejudices." Missionaries, however, were not the only channels through which education was promoted. For instance, individuals in Calcutta such as conservative Hindu scholar Rammohan Roy, Radhakanta Deb, atheist philanthropist Shib Chandra Sarkar, David Hare, and other British officials often collaborated in the Calcutta School Book Society and the Calcutta School Society. Some of the other institutions of learning established during this period include the Chittagong College; Indian Statistical Institute; the Hindu School, the oldest modern educational institution in Asia; Jadavpur University; Presidency University, Kolkata; the University of Calcutta; the University of Dhaka, the oldest university in Bangladesh; and Visva-Bharati University.

== Science ==
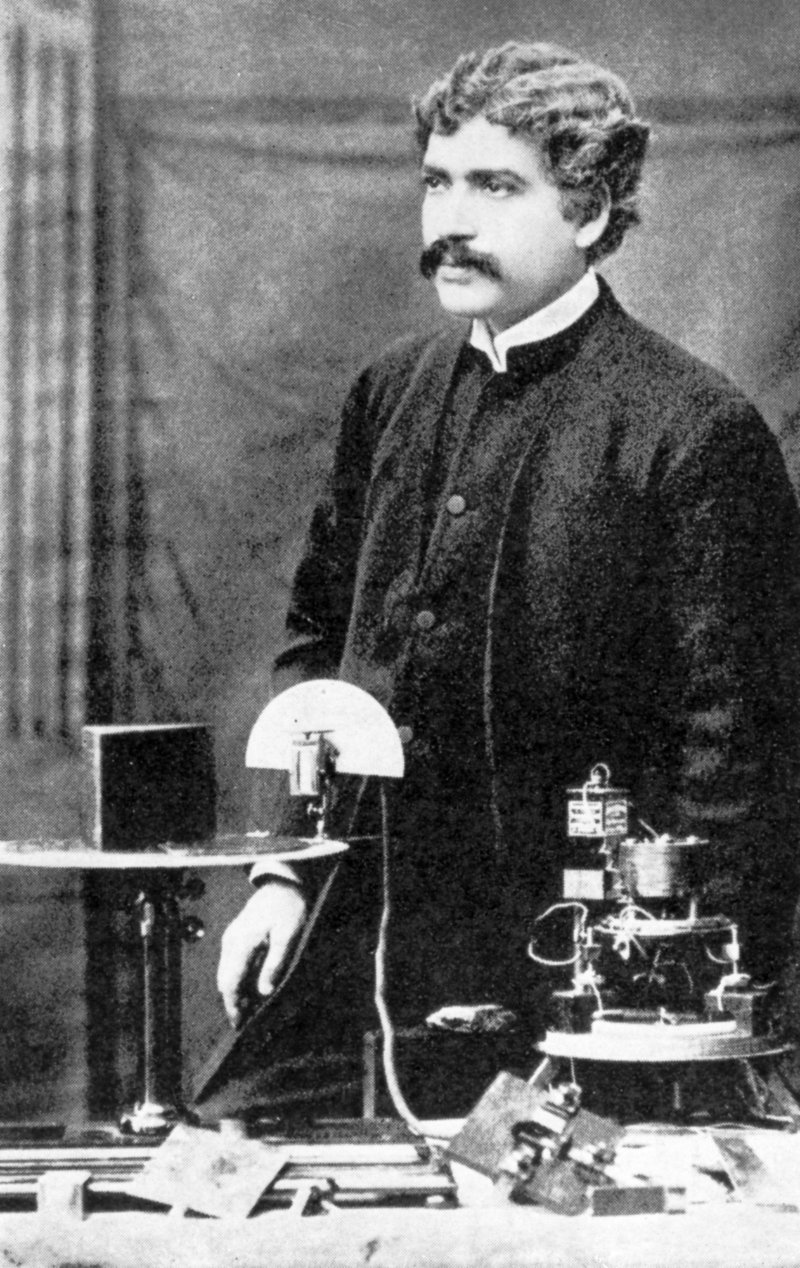
Jagadish Chandra Bose was one of the fathers of radio science.

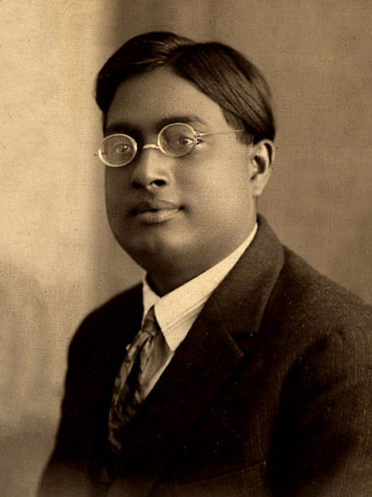
Satyendra Nath Bose was one of the pioneers of quantum mechanics.

Prafulla Chandra Ray was an eminent Bengali chemist, educationist, historian, industrialist, and philanthropist.

During the Bengal Renaissance, science was integrated into the broader intellectual and educational reforms. Institutions such as Presidency University, Calcutta Medical College, the University of Calcutta, and the IACS were pivotal in spreading modern scientific thought in British India. Lectures, Bengali-language textbooks, and the establishment of high schools such as the Hindu School contributed to making science more accessible to urban and upper-middle-class families.

Major advancements were made during this time by scientists such as Satyendra Nath Bose, Ashutosh Mukherjee, Prasanta Chandra Mahalanobis, Anil Kumar Gain, Prafulla Chandra Ray, Debendra Mohan Bose, Jagadish Chandra Bose, Jnan Chandra Ghosh, Gopal Chandra Bhattacharya, Kishori Mohan Bandyopadhyay, Jnanendra Nath Mukherjee, Sisir Kumar Mitra, Upendranath Brahmachari, and Meghnad Saha, among others.

Jagadish Chandra Bose (1858–1937) was a polymath: a physicist, biologist, botanist, archaeologist, and science fiction writer. He pioneered the investigation of radio and microwave optics, made very significant contributions to botany, and laid the foundations of experimental science in the Indian subcontinent. He is considered one of the fathers of radio science and is also considered the father of Bengali science fiction. He also invented the crescograph.

== Arts ==
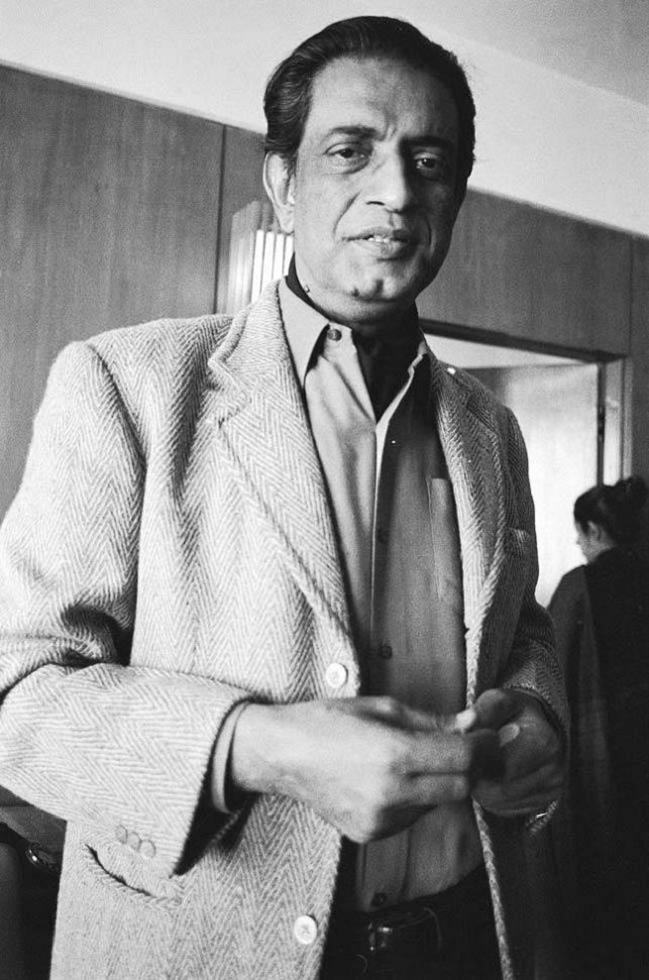
Satyajit Ray was an Indian motion-picture director, writer, and illustrator who brought Indian cinema to world recognition with Pather Panchali. He was one of the pioneers of parallel cinema.

The Bengal School of Art was an art movement and a style of Indian painting that originated in Bengal and flourished throughout British India in the early 20th century. Also known as the 'Indian style of painting' in its early days, it was associated with Indian nationalism (swadeshi) and led by Abanindranath Tagore.

Following the influence of Indian spiritual ideas in the West, the British art teacher Ernest Binfield Havell attempted to reform the teaching methods at the Calcutta School of Art by encouraging students to imitate Mughal miniatures. This caused controversy, leading to a strike by students and complaints from the local press, including from nationalists who considered it to be a retrogressive move. Havell was supported by the artist Abanindranath Tagore.

== Literature ==
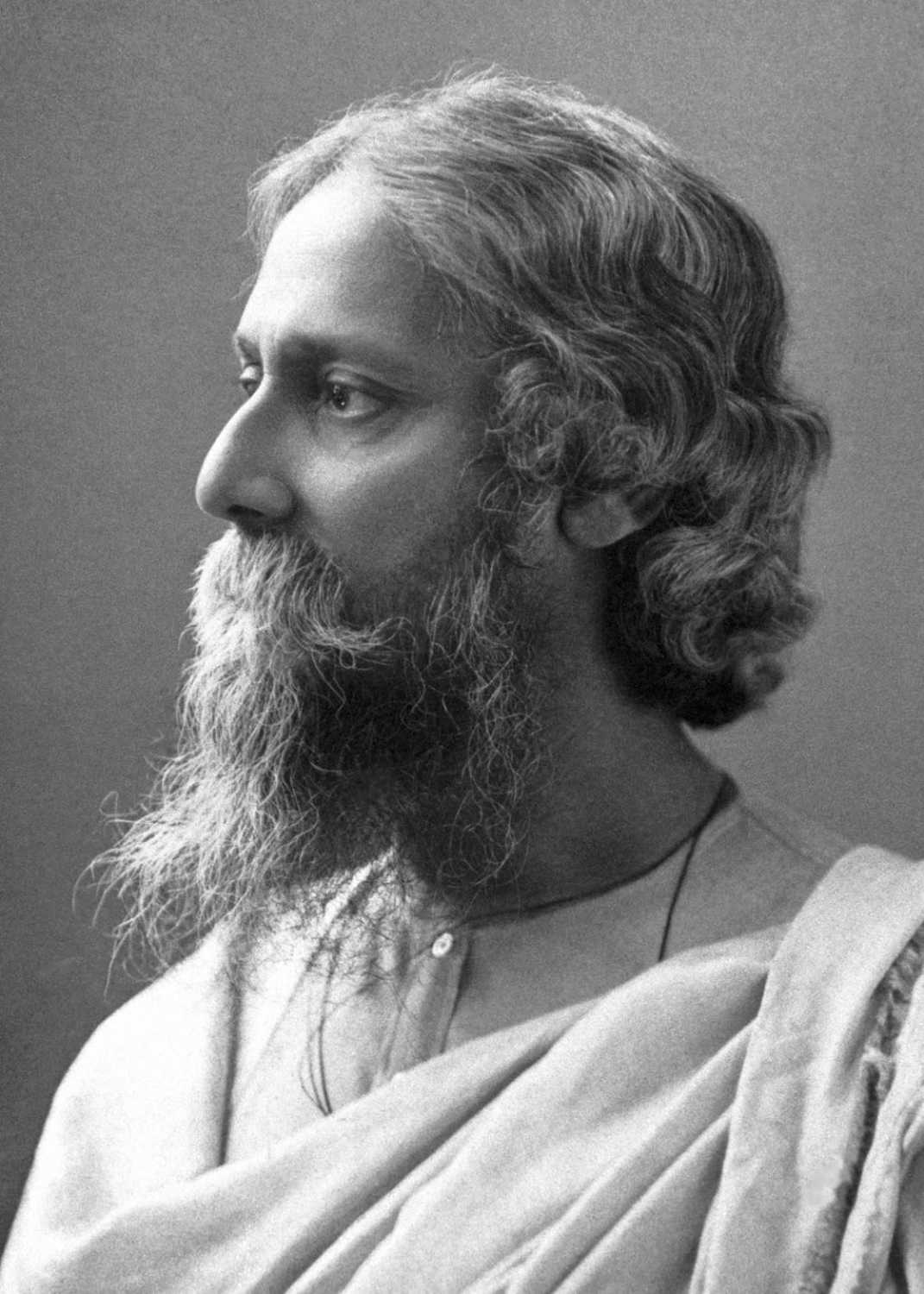
Rabindranath Tagore was a poet and artist. Awarded the Nobel Prize in Literature in 1913

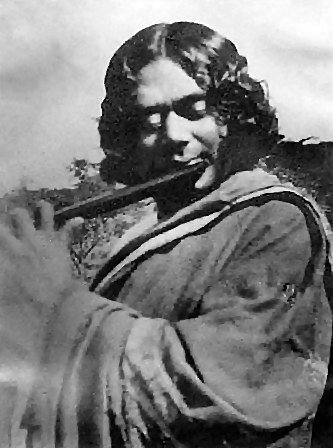
Kazi Nazrul Islam, the national poet of Bangladesh

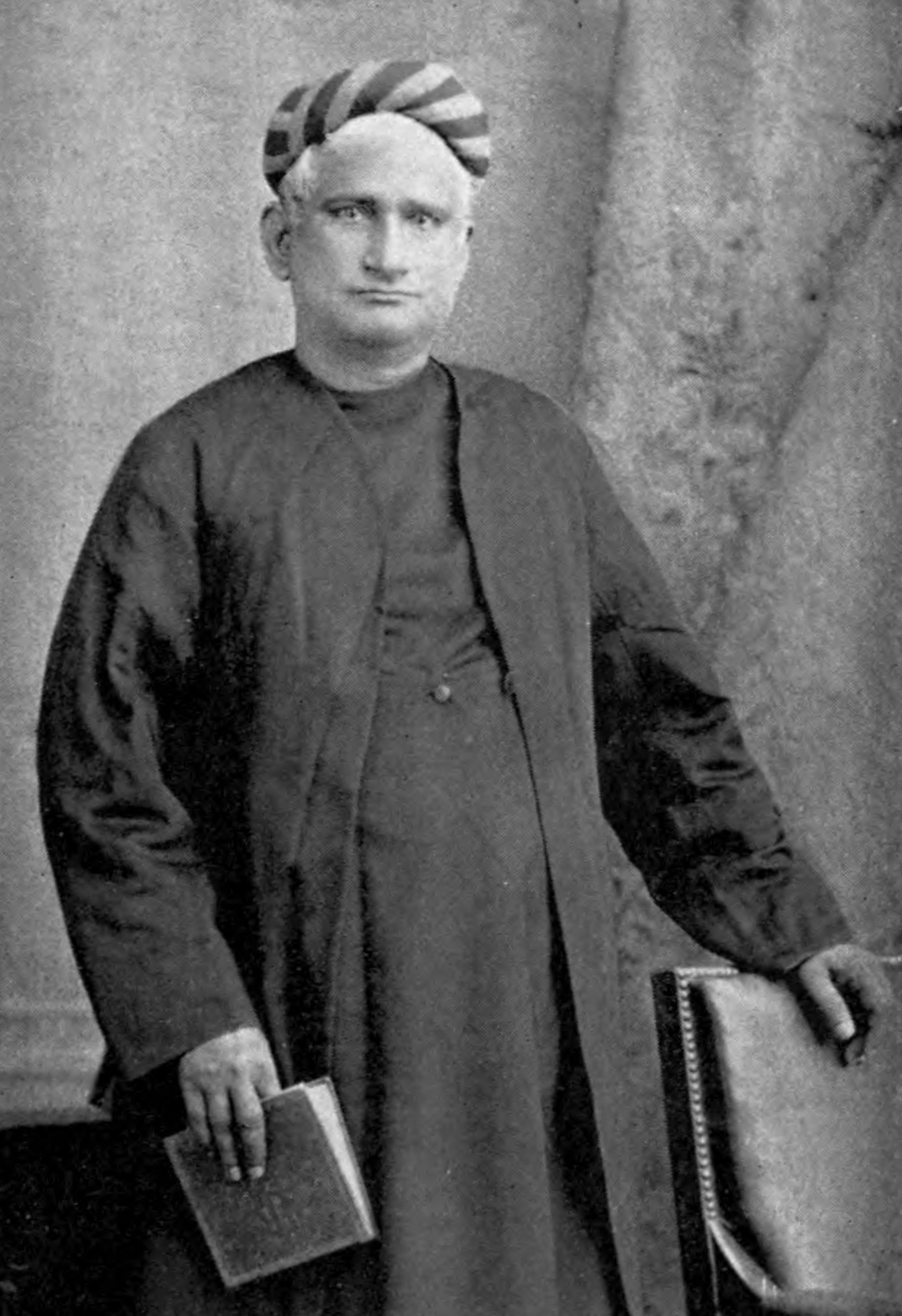
Bankim Chandra Chatterjee was the first successful novelist in the history of Bengali Literature

According to historian Romesh Chunder Dutt:

The conquest of Bengal by the English was not only a political revolution, but ushered in a greater revolution in thoughts and ideas, in religion and society ... From the stories of gods and goddesses, kings and queens, princes and princesses, we have learnt to descend to the humble walks of life, to sympathise with the common citizen or even common peasant ... Every revolution is attended with vigour, and the present one is no exception to the rule. Nowhere in the annals of Bengali literature are so many or so bright names found crowded together in the limited space of one century as those of Ram Mohan Roy, Akshay Kumar Dutt, Isvar Chandra Vidyasagar, Isvar Chandra Gupta, Michael Madhusudan Dutt, Hem Chandra Banerjee, Bankim Chandra Chatterjee and Dina Bandhu Mitra. Within the three quarters of the present century, prose, blank verse, historical fiction and drama have been introduced for the first time in the Bengali literature.

== Sports ==
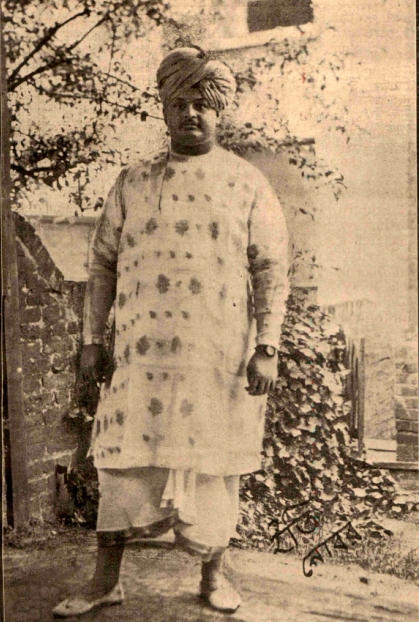
Jatindra Charan Guho, or "Gobor Goho" was a prominent Indian wrestler and world champion of the nineteenth century

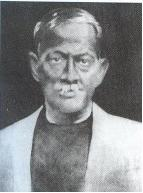
Nagendra Prasad Sarbadhikari was a prominent Indian football pioneer and educationist of the nineteenth century

== Religion and spirituality ==
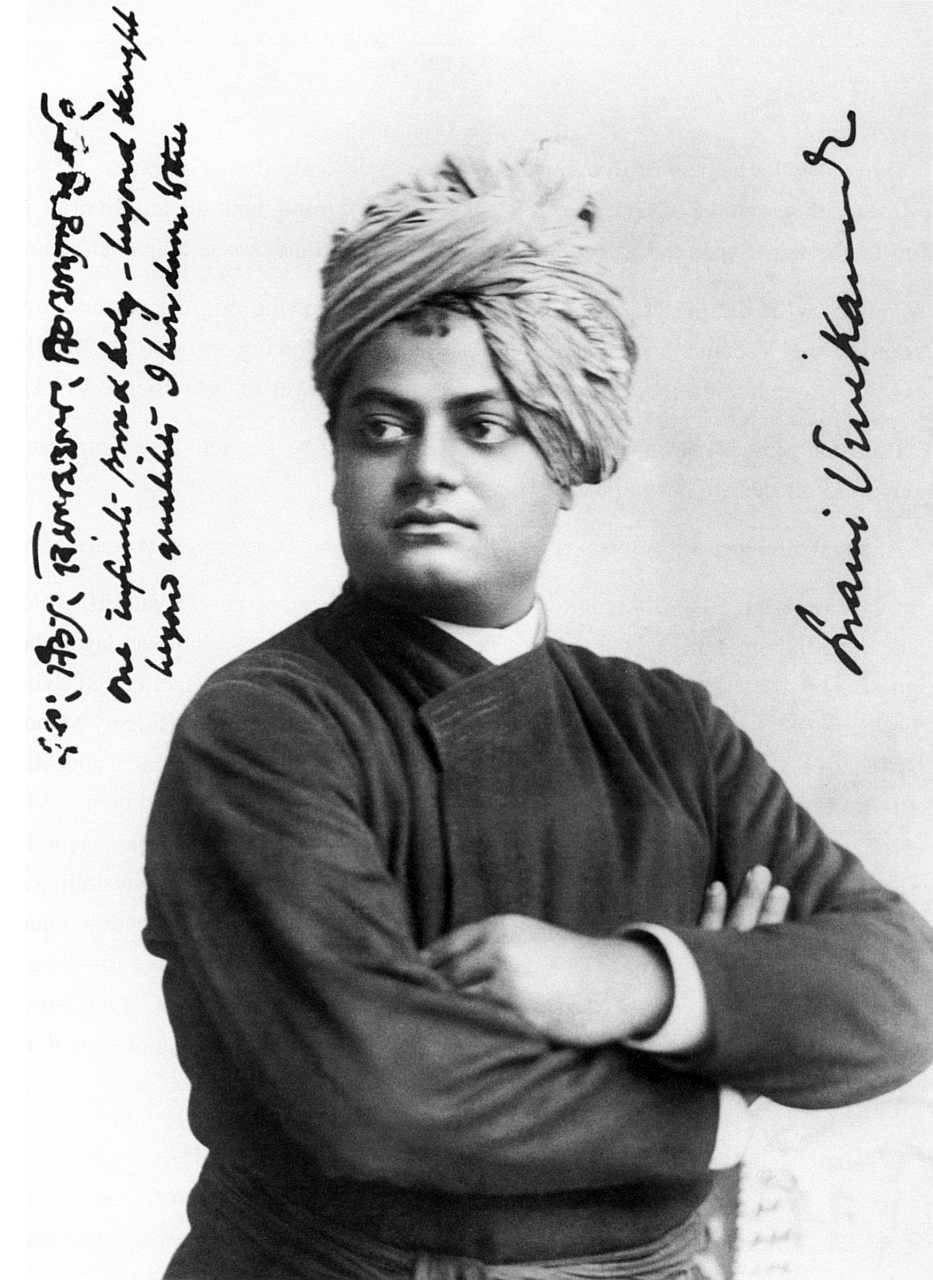
Swami Vivekananda

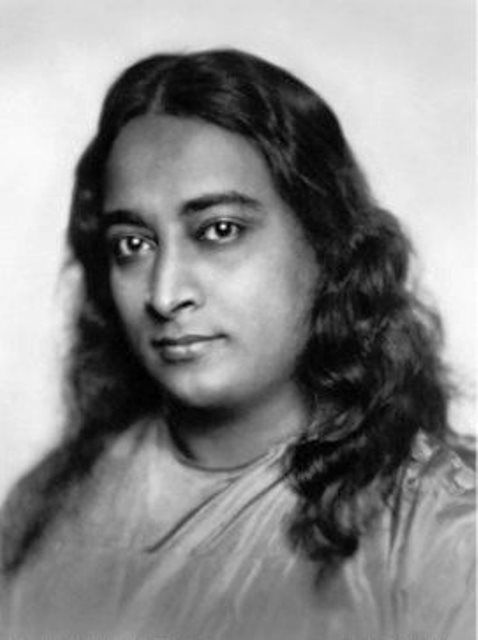
Paramahansa Yogananda

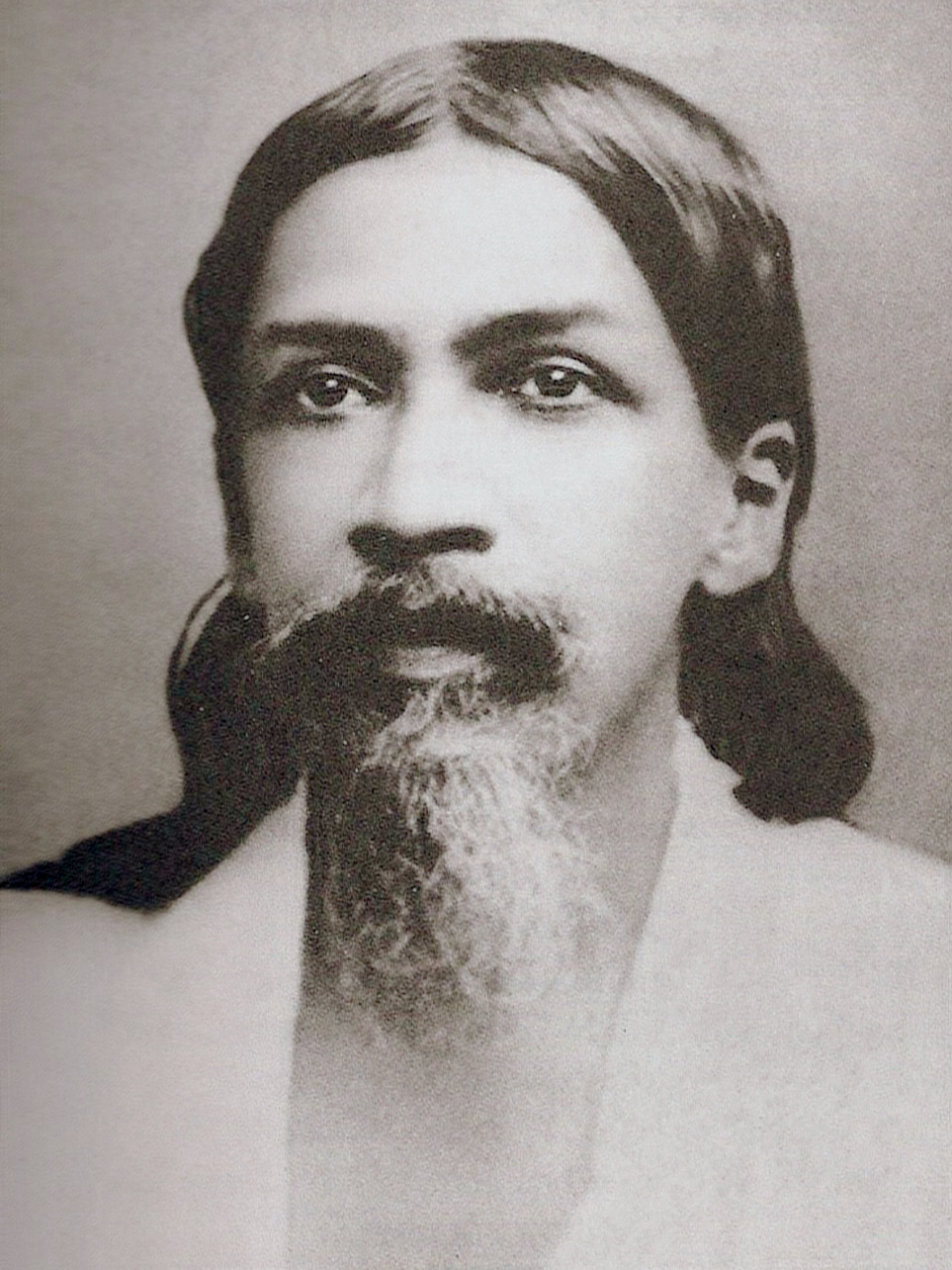
Sri Aurobindo

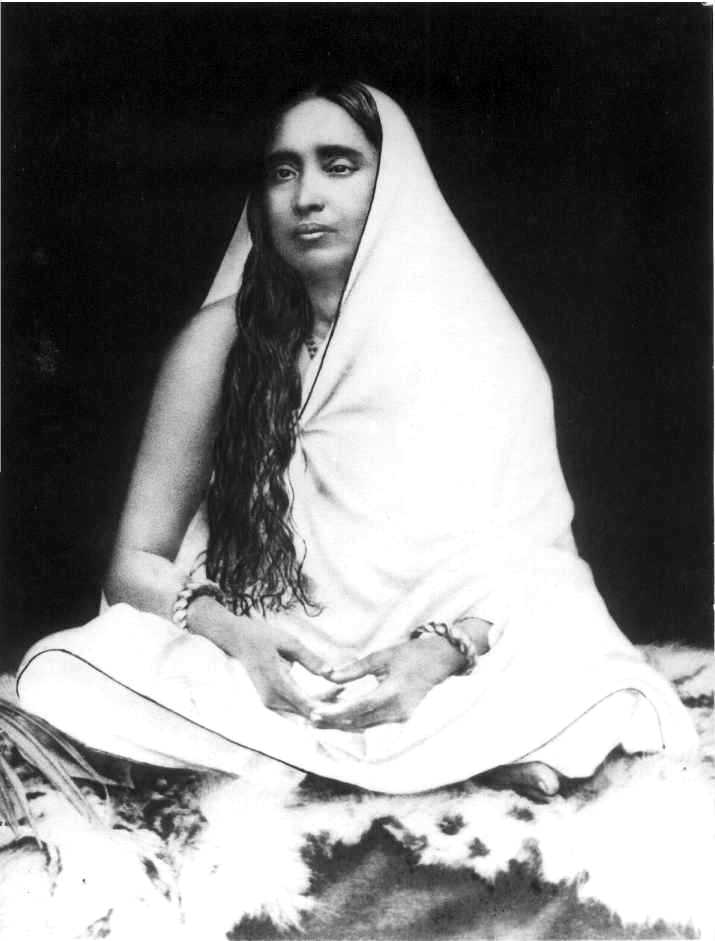
Sarada Devi

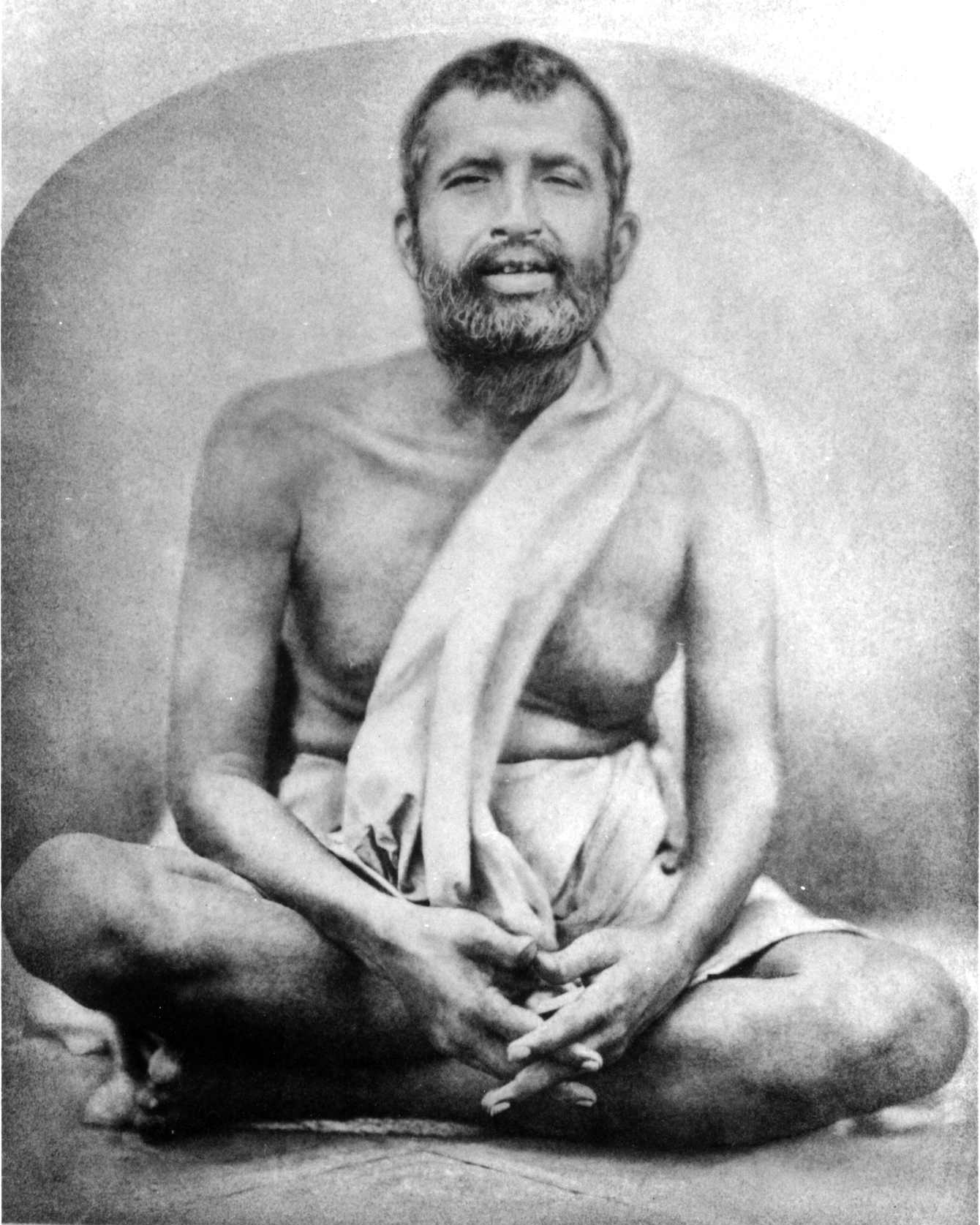
Ramakrishna

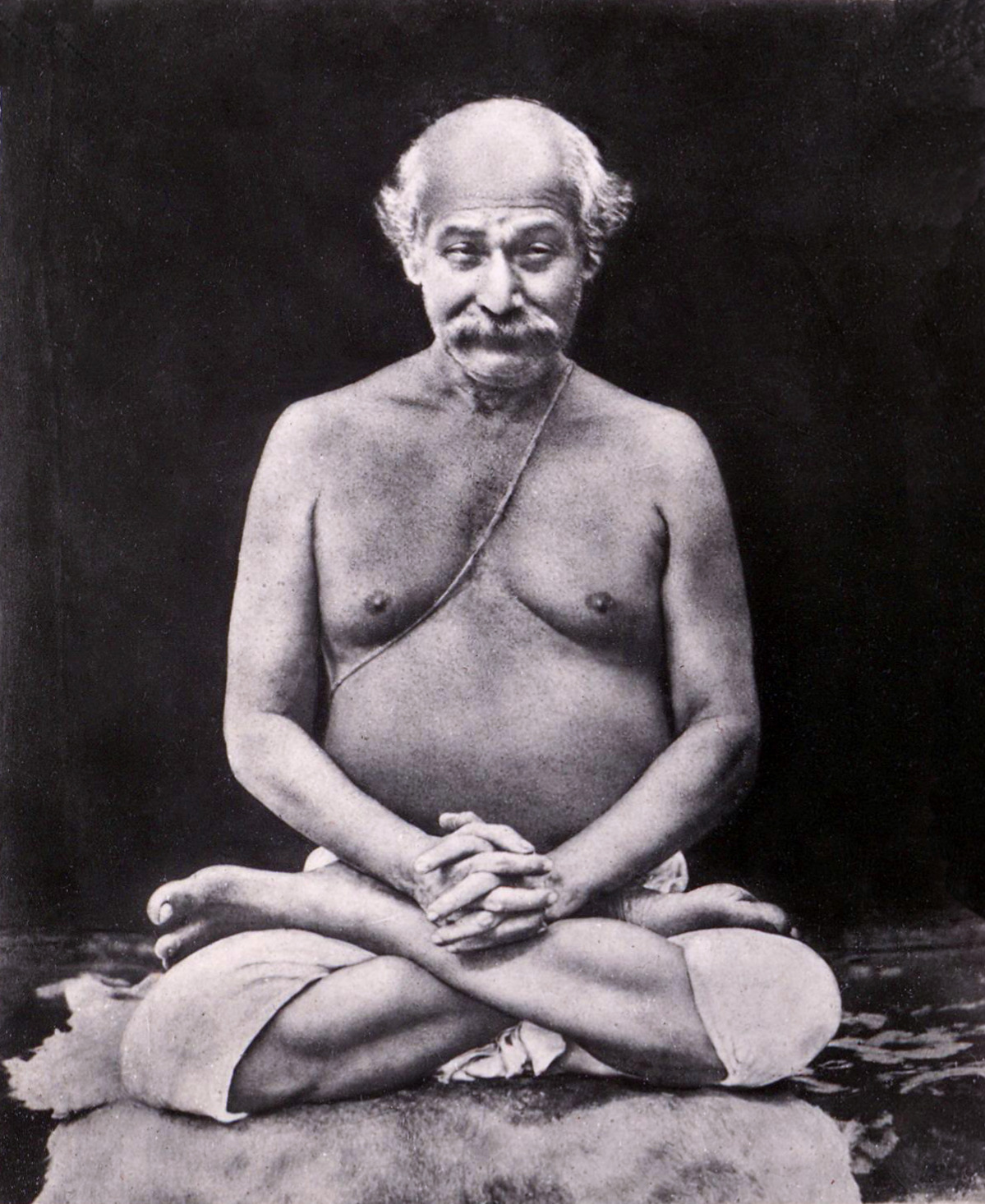
Lahiri Mahasaya

The Bengali Renaissance also led to religious reform movements. Some notable religious and spiritual leaders associated with these reform movements are Rani Rashmoni, Ram Mohan Roy, Debendranath Tagore, Keshab Chandra Sen, Bijoy Krishna Goswami, Ramakrishna, Sarada Devi, Swami Vivekananda, Aurobindo, Bamakhepa, Lokenath Brahmachari, Bhaktisiddhanta Sarasvati, Bhaktivinoda Thakur, Paramahansa Yogananda, Lahiri Mahasaya, Nigamananda Paramahansa, Ram Thakur, Sitaramdas Omkarnath, and Anandamayi Ma.

The religious reform movements and organizations associated with the Bengali Renaissance are:

- Brahmoism (Brahmo Samaj)
  - Adi Brahmo Samaj
  - Sadharan Brahmo Samaj
- Gaudiya Math
- Mahanam Sampraday
- Ramakrishna Mission
  - Ramakrishna Math
- Sri Aurobindo Ashram
- Yogoda Satsanga Society of India
  - Self-Realization Fellowship
