= Ram Chandra Vidyabagish =

Indian academic (1786–1845)

- রামচন্দ্র বিদ্যাবাগিস
- Born: 1786; Palpara, Nadia district, Bengal Presidency, British India (present day in West Bengal, India)
- Died: 2 March 1845(aged 58)
- Occupations: Writer, Professor, Academics, Sanskrit scholars

Ramchandra Vidyabagish (Bengali: রামচন্দ্র বিদ্যাবাগীশ; 1786 – 2 March 1845) was an Indian lexicographer and Sanskrit scholar. His Bangabhashabhidhan, the first monolingual Bengali dictionary, was published in 1817. He taught at the Vedanta College established by Raja Rammohun Roy, and later at Sanskrit College from 1827 to 1837. Closely associated with the work of Rammohun Roy in Kolkata, he was the first secretary of the Brahmo Sabha, established in 1828, and initiated Debendranath Tagore and 21 other young men into Brahmo Samaj in 1843.
