= Adi Dharm =

Religious movement from mid-19th century Bengal

Brahmoism
- Scripture: Brahmo Dharma
- Theology: Monotheism
- Pradhanacharya (current since 2006): Sarbajit Roy
- Associations: Brahmo Samaj
- Founder: Ram Mohan Roy
- Origin: 28 August 1828 (197 years ago); Calcutta, British India
- Separated from: Sanātanī Hinduism
- Official website: true.brahmosamaj.in

Adi Dharm refers to the religion of Adi Brahmo Samaj (Bengali: আদি ব্রাহ্ম সমাজ, romanized: Adi Brahmô Shômaj) the first development of Brahmoism and includes people of the Sadharan Brahmo Samaj who were reintegrated into Brahmoism after the second schism of 1878 at the instance of Devendranath Tagore. This was the first organised casteless movement in British India and reverberated from its heart of Bengal to Assam, Bombay State (Maharashtra and Gujarat), Punjab and Madras, Hyderabad, and Bangalore.

== Tenets ==
It was never conceived as an "anti-caste" movement, but stood for repudiation of all "distinctions between people" and foundation of a modern educated Indian nation under the timeless and formless God, and its adherents as Adi Dharmis (or worshipers of the ancient formless indivisible One God called Brahma or the Parambrahma "The One without a Second" or EkAdavaitam). Although the doctrine of Adi Dharma is superficially similar to other reformatory "sects" of Hinduism which speak of "different paths to One God", the core beliefs of Adi Dharm irrevocably place Adi Dharm and Brahmoism as the youngest of India's nine religions beyond the pale of "Hinduism's catholicism and elasticity".

The core Adi Dharma doctrinal beliefs include:

1. There is only One "Supreme Spirit", Author and Preserver of Existence. (...Beyond description, immanent, transcendent, eternal, formless, infinite, powerful, radiant, loving, light in the darkness, ruling principle of existence... Polytheism is denounced. Idolatry i.e. worship of images is opposed.)
2. There is no salvation and no way to achieve it. ("Works will win". Worshipful work is the way of existence. Work is for both body and soul. All life exists to be consumed. The soul is immortal and does not return to this World. There is neither rebirth nor Heaven or Hell.)
3. There is no scripture, revelation, creation, prophet, priest or teacher to be revered. (Only the Supreme Spirit of Existence can be revered – not the Vedas, Granths, Bible or Quran etc. Worship consist of revering the "inner light within" i.e. enlightened conscience.)
4. There is no distinction. (All men are equal. Distinctions like caste, race, creed, colour, gender, nationality etc. are artificial. There is no need for priests, places of worship, long sermons etc. "Man-worship" or "God-men" are abhorrent to the faith and denounced since there is no mediator between man and God.)

== Founders of Adi Dharma ==
The Adi Dharma religion was started by Ram Mohan Roy, Debendranath Tagore and Prasanna Kumar Tagore.

This Adi Brahma religion Adi Dharma was originally propounded by these Brahmins of Bengal who were excommunicated from Hindu faith for opposing social and priestly evils of the time (18th and 19th centuries). Previously the original ancestors (5 legendary Brahmin scholars of Kannauj Kanyakubja school deputed to the King of Bengal) of all these Bengali Brahmins had been excommunicated from Kannauj (Uttar Pradesh) in the 10th/11th century AD after their return from Bengal.

=== Mobility ===
"Mobility" i.e. leaving the home and being exposed to external influence meant loss of caste for Brahmins (a social device to conserve meagre land holdings and priestly incomes).

Mobile scholars of priestly Brahmin clans such as these in contact with (or in the service of) foreign rulers – like the Mughals or European companies or Indian princes – were deliberately ostracised by their "fixed" priestly Hindu clan peers (relatives) ensconced within the numerous temples of Bengal and denied their shares of ancestral undivided properties and incomes. As a consequence ghastly social evils like Sati (or the burning alive of Hindu widows) were encouraged, primarily by the fixed priestly class. The mobile clan members banded into associations (Sabhas) to oppose these un-Brahmic practices colliding head on with orthodox Hindu society in Bengal.

The 'Raja' Ram Mohan was the first Indian to cross the seas to Britain in 1833, followed by 'Prince' Dwarkanath in 1842. Raja was so exhausted by work that he became seriously ill and died at Bristol.

== Genesis of Adi Dharma ==
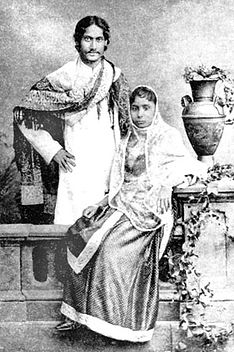
Rabindranath Tagore with wife Mrinalini Devi from a Pirali Brahmin clan which some Tagores regularly married into

The Adi Dharma founders were regularly tainted and scandalised by orthodoxy as Pirali Brahmin and defamed as being officially banned from entering temples like Jaganath Temple (Puri) by Government regulations of 1807. Subsequently, their families also faced great difficulty in arranging marriages for some of their children such as India's poet-laureate Rabindranath Tagore who could only manage a Pirali Brahmin bride unlike his brothers who married high caste Brahmin brides. This ultimate exclusionary weapon of Hindu orthodoxy resulted in endogamous tendencies in Adi Dharm marriage practice between these 2 branches of Adi Dharma in the Tagore family, placing Satyendranath Tagore and Rabindranath Tagore and their families against their exogamous brothers. The noted Adi Brahmo historian Kshitindranath Tagore (son of Hemendranath Tagore) who succeeded Rabindranath Tagore as editor of the Adi Dharma organ, has written that it was Rabindranath who destroyed many family documents.

"In those days the practice of having Gharjamai was in vogue in our family, mainly because we were Piralis and then became Brahmos; therefore, there was no possibility of somebody from a good Hindu family marrying into our (i.e. the endogamous branch) family [...] the system of marriages amongst relatives was started [...] it became almost impossible to get our children married. Our being ostracised by the Hindu society provided us with a certain freedom in absorbing western influences, and at the same time the Adi Brahmo Samaj was a branch of Hindu society in all respects except the practice of idolatry. Maharshi always expressed a hearty desire to establish this, and as such all the rituals and customs of Hindu society were followed in his family, and that environment prevailed at least till he was alive." wrote Indira Devi Choudhurani (Smritisamput Vol I (1997/2000), in Bengali, Rabindra Bhaban, Viswa Bharati, p. 18-19). Indira Devi Choudhurani was daughter of Satyendranath Tagore and very close to Rabindranath. "The Autobiography of Debendranath Tagore" is also attributed to Satyendranath Tagore and this daughter.

== Adi Brahma Dharm timeline ==
=== Adi Brahma Sabha ===
Consequently, the Adi Brahmos then set up their own faith called Adi Brahma Sabha in 1828/1830 by Trust Deed of Brahmo Sabha and codified their religion as Adi Brahma Dharma published from 1848. The founders of this Brahmo religion were foremost reformers for nationalism, equality, secularism and education which now stand enshrined in the Constitution of India as Fundamental Rights. These founding fathers of Adi Dharma believed then that Hinduism was thoroughly corrupted and debased and that strong Law (i.e. Dharma) of first Moslems and then English Rulers could cleanse India from these evils. For their associations with the Rulers of the times, they were ostracised and barred from orthodox Hindu society but were amply compensated by "being so weighed down in honours by the British that they forgot all the radicalism of their youth." It was Dwarkanath Tagore alone who could publicly lambast an English Magistrate Abercrombie Dick on the emergence of servile mai-baap (great lord) ruling culture of 19th-century Bengal as follows:

[...] If Mr. Dick wishes me to specify what I deem the present characteristic failings of the natives I answer that they are – a want of truth, a want of integrity, a want of independence. [...] arising from being subjected to misrule of an ignorant, intolerant and licentious soldiery [...] falling into abject submission, deceit and fraud.

Previously in 1829 Dwarkanath and Prasanna Kumar had founded the Landholders (Zamindars) Association which in its variants went on to play such role in modern India's development. The first major success of this Zamindari Sabha was arraigning the East India Company forces against Titumir a Muslim extortionist of Zamindar's (landlords who perpetuated a system of feudalism with the support of the British), at Nadia in November 1831.

=== Trust Deed Principles (1830) ===
By the 1830 Trust Deed of Brahmo Sabha principles it was held that all men are equal and without distinction and there is no need for priests or formal places for worship etc.

=== Adi Brahma Dharma doctrine (1848/1850) ===
By the 1848 Adi Brahma Dharma published doctrine of Debendranath Tagore, it was held that present Hinduism doctrine is corrupted, but that the original Vedas of pre-Aryan times (being relatively pure, though still fallible and not Scripture to be relied on) as reflected by 11 judiciously chosen Upanishads also speak of a single formless God who requires no temple or priest or idol for worship, only a rational and pure conscience of an intelligent mind. That there is no caste – high or low – all people are equal, in this World and before God. The doctrine of reincarnation is rejected. The doctrine of God being incarnate is also rejected.

=== Caste Disability Removal Act (1850) ===
This publication resulted in the famous "Caste Disabilities Removal Act" of August 1850, and Brahmos were free to establish their own religion and marry amongst themselves without fear of disinheritance from ancestral property. At the 23 December 1850 annual meeting of Calcutta Brahmo Samaj, Debendranath formally announced the Brahma Dharma as doctrine of the new religion. This announcement resolving certain aspects of Hinduism in Rammohun's doctrine also served to effectively separate Brahmoism from Hinduism.

=== Lala Hazarilal's Shudra controversy (1851) ===
Krishnanagar in Nadia district of West Bengal has always had special place in Brahmoism. Many old Brahmo families came from here including that of Ramtanu Lahiri who was the first Adi Dharmi to renounce his Brahmanical caste thread in 1851 (even before Debendra Nath who removed his in 1862). The gesture by Debendranath of sending Lala Hazarilal of Indore (an untouchable from the lowest Shudra caste by birth) as Adi Dharma's first preacher to Krishnagar instead of a Brahmin preacher well versed in Sanskrit literature was, however, not too well appreciated and gave great offence to the Nadia royal family.

=== Christian missionaries banned (1856) ===
In 1856, Christian preachers attempting to convert Adi Dharma adherents were banned entry into Brahmo premises by Debendranath Tagore.

=== Adi Dharma mission to Punjab (1861) ===
In 1861 the famous Adi Brahmo preacher Pundit Navin Chandra Rai ("Roy") went to Punjab and spread this new faith and opened many Adi Brahmo houses of worship all over Punjab at Jullundur, Lyallpur, Lahore, Amritsar etc. People of all faiths and castes without distinction flocked to the new creed, and over 580 Pandit families were enrolled until 1870. Subsequently, the Oriental College was established at Lahore by Pundit N. C. Rai.

=== Adi Dharma mission to Andhra and Telangana ===
In 1861 another Adi Brahmo preacher Atmuri Lakshminarasimham returned to Madras Presidency and devoted much time in the Telugu speaking areas. Many publications of Adi Samaj in Bengali were translated into Telugu language and published by him from the printing presses of Madras. In 1862, he came in contact with and converted Kandukuri Veeresalingam who was to become father of Telugu language and notable Brahmo nationalist of the era. Later the two fell out over religious differences

=== First schism in Brahmo Samaj (1866) ===
In 1865/1866 there was a dispute in the Brahmo Samaj over caste distinctions, and many younger members of the Samaj who were influenced by Christian missionaries were expelled from the Adi Samaj by Hemendranath Tagore – which religion was henceforth known as the Adi Brahmo Samaj.

=== Character of Adi Dharma changes (1867–) ===
From 1867 after the first schism, the Adi Dharma movement became stridently nationalistic. A Hindu Mela was regularly organised which became the precursor to the Swadeshi movement and then the Indian National Congress. In the meanwhile the expelled Christian factions from Adi Samaj launched a sustained and bitter campaign to wean away the Adi Dharma missions outside Bengal. A great deal of propaganda was hurled from both sides.

=== Brahmo Marriage Bill controversy (1871) ===
In 1871 the expelled group petitioned the Government to recognise them and their inter-faith marriages claiming that Brahmos are not Hindu, Christian, Moslem, Jew or Parsi etc.. The Adi Brahmo group opposed this stating We are Brahmos first, and Hindus second and finally a compromise Law was passed as Act III of 1872 to enable marriages between Brahmos and thereby recognising the Brahmo religion by State.

=== Adi Dharma's Maharshi and Gurudev visit Punjab (1872) ===
In 1872/1873 Debendranath Tagore (Maharshi) and his son Rabindranath Tagore (Gurudev) visited Punjab and spent much time in worship at the Golden Temple at Amritsar. A famous Sikh gentleman Sardar Dayal Singh Majithia from the priestly family of this temple joined the Adi Dharma and subsequently contributed much money to the faith and also became a founder Trustee of the Sadharan Brahmo Samaj in 1880.

=== Emergence of Arya Samaj in Punjab (1875) ===
In the meantime (1872–1875) in Punjab due to schisms in Adi Brahmo Samaj at Calcutta, a new variant of Adi Brahmoism called Arya Samaj began to take root. While travelling its founder Swami Dayanand came into close and extended contact with Raj Narayan Bose, Debendranath Tagore etc. Swami Dayanand closely studied Tagore's book Brahmo Dharma, a comprehensive manual of religion and ethics for Adi Dharma, while in Calcutta. The bone of contention between these two Samajs was over the authority of the Vedas – whose authority the Adi Dharma reject and hold to be inferior works, whereas Arya Samaj hold Vedas to be divine revelation. Despite this difference of opinion, however, it seems that the members of the Brahmo Samaj and Swami Dayanand parted on good terms, the former having publicly praised the latter's visit to Calcutta in several journals and the latter having taken inspiration from the former's activity in the social sphere.

=== Lala Hardayal pracharok in Northern India (1876) ===
Another close associate of Debendranath Tagore, Lala Hardayal volunteered to promote the Adi Dharma cause in the Central Provinces and Punjab. He linked up with Sirdar Dayal Singh Majithia and the pure Adi Dharma message of One God without Caste or Priests took great root in this Province. Many low caste Sikhs, low caste Hindu converts to Christianity etc. joined the Adi Brahma Dharma to be eventually absorbed back after education into their respective faiths. It is pertinent that Debendranath was greatly influenced by works of Kabir and Guru Nanak and always kept their books at his side.

=== Developments of Adi Dharma in Telangana (1870–1880) ===
By 1871 Kandukuri Veeresalingam (father of Telugu nation) was heavily influenced by Brahmoism. A movement was covertly established by him to seek independence of the Telugu speaking provinces of Madras Presidency and the Nizamate of Hyderabad. A secret society for this was organised in 1878 in Rajahmundry under the cover of Prarthana Samaj of Andhra Pradesh. He bitterly opposed immoral (i.e. polygamy and child marriage) practices of the upper classes of Telangana starting a new phase of reform for Adi Dharma in Telugu speaking regions.

"He contributed to the political sphere by his activist journalism of writing about issues such as corruption in the local administration. The presidency government kept a close tab on the Indian language press and sometimes responded to investigate such allegations. Viresalingam also intervened more directly by conducting widow remarriages and popularising new forms of voluntary association."

Kandukuri vacillated between Adi Dharm nationalism and Keshab Sen's dictum of "Loyalty to Sovereign" being rewarded with Rao Bahadur title in 1893 by British. But by clinging to Keshab Sen philosophy of "Loyalty to Sovereign" until 1907, Viresalingam found himself increasingly isolated from the militant ideology of Adi Dharma's new stridently nationalistic adherents in the region.

=== Second phase of formation of Provincial Samajes (1878–) ===
In 1862 and again in 1864 the Adi Dharma stalwarts from Calcutta visited Bombay and Madras Presidencies. They also visited Hyderabad (Deccan). As a result, many anti-caste, One Formless God Adi Dharma affiliates were started including the Prarthana Samaj in Mumbai. The Veda Samaj in Madras, and the Brahma Samaj in what is now Andhra Pradesh.

=== Many Christian members reabsorbed in Adi Dharma (1878–1880) ===
In 1878 these expelled neo-Christian members split again, but almost all of them recanted (by having executed a Trust Deed of Sadharan Brahmo Samaj in 1880 virtually identical in Principles to the 1830 Adi Dharma Trust Deed) and were reabsorbed into Brahmoism by Maharshi Debendranath and Rajnarayan Basu the founders of Hindutva (i.e. Brahmoism's nationalistic religion of Adi Dharma which means all Indians are one without distinction, regionalism and caste) as Sadharan Brahmo Samaj. The small remainder of Brahmos heretics formed a Christian / Baha'i new world religion called Navabidhan or New Dispensation and are not considered part of Adi Dharma and in 1891 formed another Samaj in Bangladesh and are called Sammilani's (or Universal Brahmo Religionists) organising annual Conference of Theists.

=== Tragedies in Tagore family of 1884 ===
In 1884 there were two demises in Debendranath's family. The deaths of his third son Hemendranath at the young age of 40 and the unexplained suicide of his daughter-in-law Kadambari Devi (wife of his fifth son Jyotirindranath the then Secretary of the Adi Brahmo Samaj) in April were to have significant implications for Adi Dharm.

=== Legal victories for Adi Dharma (1897–1903) ===
In 1897 a landmark decision of the High Court of the Punjab in Sirdar Dayal Singh's case after his demise, upholds that Brahmoism is a separate religion from Hinduism (except for the Adi Brahmos – Adi Dharmis who remain within Hinduism), whereas simultaneously affirming such gems as "...Sikhs are Hindus and nothing but Hindus..." and "A Sikh (Sardar Dyal Singh) who follows Brahmoism without actually converting to it continues to remain a Hindu." This decision is confirmed by the Privy Council in 1903 (Rani Bhagwan Koer & Anr. vs. Acharya J.C.Bose and Ors) and is the leading judgement even today on the vexed question of "Who is a Hindu?".

=== Adi Dharma in North India, Pandit Nabin Chandra Ray ===
The heart of Adi Dharma in Punjab Province was Bengal's Adi Brahmo Samaj legend Pundit Nabin Chandra Ray. The Punjab Brahmo Samaj under his influence favoured Hindi language as against Punjabi actuated by nationalistic considerations. He looked upon Hindi as the national language of India and wanted it to be the foundation for the edifice of Indian nationality. He was the founder of Oriental College Lahore and also its principal. He was the first Assistant Registrar of Punjab University, and one of its Fellows. He was Secretary of the Stri Shiksha Sabha fighting against heavy odds to establish girls schools. He was one of the most active members of the Anjumani Punjab, afterwards becoming its Secretary and renamed it as Jnan Vistarini Sabha engaging eight Pundits to translate various works. To spread reform among the backward people of Punjab he published various newspapers in Punjabi, Urdu and Hindi and the highly controversial "Widow Remarriage Advertiser" in English. For the depressed classes he started a night school and the Chamar Sabha. His doors were open to all helpless and the poor. After N. C.Rai left the Punjab in course of his service, initiation into Adi Dharm was given to castes other than Brahmin or Pandit by his successors – a few of whom were Sikh. As a result, many Sikhs also joined Adi Dharm in large numbers relying on the Mul Mantra of Sikhism i.e. Japji Sahib which begins as Ik Onkar Sat Naam Karta Purakh translated as "There is only one God His name is Truth He is the Creator."

=== Provocation in the Punjab (1900–) ===
In 1900 the Government passed the Land Alienation Act. In 1907 other taxing laws were promulgated and finally in 1919 the Government of India Act was amended. As a result, the lower castes of North India were effectively deprived from land ownership. At the same time the Government divided the electorate on communal lines, resulting in sharp polarisation between Hindus, Muslims and Sikhs. To counter this the leadership of Adi Dharma (at its 1916 conference at Kanpur) resolved to propagate Adi Brahmoism as a distinct religion for the Punjab. In 1917 this resolution was also seconded by the Indian National Congress which was then closely associated with Adi Dharm.

=== Adi Dharma expands to Bodo people (1906) ===
In 1906 another preacher from Assam by name Kalicharan Brahma was initiated into Brahmoism. His reform work among the Bodo people established the Bodo Brahma Dharma among the Bathow religionists of Assam and reformed the religion of Adivasi people considerably. The followers of Adi Dharam in that region are known as Brahmas.

=== Schisms in Punjab branches (1922–) ===
From 1922 onwards, dissension in Arya Samaj factions of Punjab between the Vasant Rai and Mangoo Ram groups again split the regional Adi Dharma movement. Both groups approached the Lahore Headquarters of Adi Brahmo Samaj for recognition which was denied to both. This led to rivalry and inducements from all sides including Arya Samaj, Christian missionaries, Sikhism etc. causing considerable confusion in the Northern Provinces as to who represents Adi Dharma here. The major controversy at this time concerned many depressed caste Sikhs of Chamar grade in a supposedly casteless Sikhism rediscovered Ravidass's teachings of the 14th century (claimed by them to be incorporated in Guru Granth Sahib) and got themselves registered as Adi Dharmi's in the 1921 and 1931 Census of Punjab after the legal decision in Bhagwan Koer's case and the Pirali precedent. This action by a section in the Punjab once again revived the Pirali controversy which echoed in Calcutta. Concerted action and representation by Adi Dharma and all sections of Brahmo Samaj ensured that after 1931 no further caste based census took place in India. Thereafter the Indian National Congress revived casteism again with M. K. Gandhi asserting on 7 September 1936 "...Sikhism is part of Hinduism and if becoming a Sikh is conversion then this kind of conversion on the part of Harijans is dangerous."

=== Adi Dharma leaders from the Punjab ===
- Lala Kashi Ramji – A widely respected person who travelled all over Northern India spreading message of the Samaj.
- Prof. Ruchi Ram Sahni – Secretary of Lahore Samaj and Secretary of Dayal Singh Educational Trust.
- Baboo Abinash Chandra Mazommdar – Set up many T. B. Sanitoria in Punjab and Simla.
- Bhai Prakash Devji – Joined Adi Dharma after leaving Dev Samaj. Instrumental in drawing many adherents to Adi Dharm. Also Editor of Brahma Pracharak from 1903 until 1908.
- Bhai Sitaramji – Pillar of Punjab Samajes from Sialkot. After Partition settled in Delhi at Delhi Brahmo Samaj.
- Lala Basant Lalji – From orthodox Punjabi Kayastha family converted to Adi Dharm (Brahmo Samaj) on returning from England. Become Commissioner of Income Tax Delhi and pillar of Delhi Brahmo Samaj. His elder son was Air Chief Marshal Pratap Chandra Lal (Chief of Air Staff – India).

=== Marriage validity controversies (1938–) ===
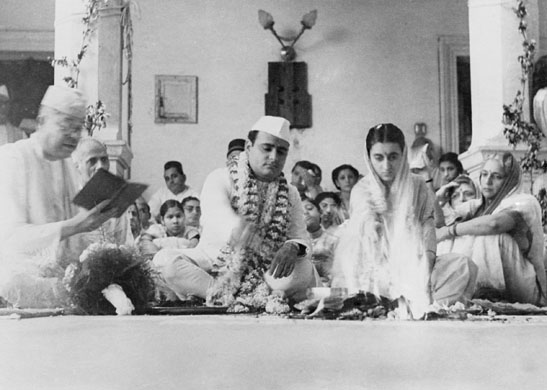
Indira Gandhi's controversial "...neither conventional nor legal..." Vedic wedding. Image from The Guardian.

A considerable controversy also erupted at this time over validity of Arya Samaj marriages. With low-caste converts to Christianity being reinducted into Hindu ranks after shuddhikaran or purification, orthodox Hindu society was not prepared to accept these reconverts or marry with them. With a few deaths of such converts often from very rich families or landed gentry, property disputes began reaching the Courts and the existing laws proved inadequate. With neither side willing to budge, a Marriage Law for Arya Samajis was deferred for almost 25 years. Luckily, Krishna Hutheesing (a sister of Jawaharlal Nehru) wanted to marry a Prince – a Jain by religion. Such a marriage between parties of different castes although then allowed in Law (by further amendment in the Brahmo law in 1923) was frowned upon and meant separation from the family and community. They arranged to be married under the Adi Brahmo Law of 1872 and gave false declarations (as was done in B. K. Nehru's case also). When these facts came out, the Adi Brahmo's fiercely objected to misuse of their Act.

In 1938 Jawaharal Nehru's daughter Indira insisted on marrying her sweetheart Feroze. Once again being of different faiths they could not be legally married under any law of the time except the Adi Dharma Law. The elders (including Rabindranath Tagore) of Brahmo Samaj at Shantiniketan, Delhi and Allahabad were consulted (by M. K. Gandhi) and after considerable disagreement advised instead that the long pending Marriage Validity Law for converted low caste Arya Samajis be enacted, which was speedily done in 1939 by an obliging British Government, enabling the loving couple to be wed in early 1942 by secret pre-Vedic Adi Dharm reformed Brahmic rites taught to Nehru's priest by Adi Dharma elders at Allahabad in the presence of Brahmos like Sarojini Naidu with the groom wearing a sacred Brahmic thread in secret. Ever since, these Adi Dharma rites have been used by the Gandhi-Nehru family for their marriages – such as for Rajiv Gandhi to Sonia Gandhi, Sanjay Gandhi to Maneka Gandhi, Priyanka Gandhi to Robert Vadra etc. and the law of Adi Dharma has never been repealed despite passage of the Hindu Code in 1955 which repealed all such similar marriage validity laws for other faiths.

=== Post Independence developments (1947–) ===
After Partition of India in 1947, the Adi Brahmo Dharma Headquarters for the region shifted from Lahore to New Delhi to Adi Brahmo Brahmin descendants of Babu Raj Chandra Chaudhuri's (who married daughter of Babu N. C. Rai) family settled here.

=== Ambedkar and Adi Dharma (1949–) ===
In 1949–1950 B. R. Ambedkar approached the Adi Dharm leaders at Delhi to get absorbed his followers into Adi Dharma. Due to bitter debates in the Constituent Assembly with Brahmo members and over the Hindu Marriages Validity Act 1949, he could not be accommodated within the Adi Dharma principles. This was chiefly due to his insistence on denouncing Manu – paradoxically respected by Adi Dharma's founding father's as a great Lawgiver. Thereafter in about 1955 Ambedkar and his followers instead chose to join Buddhism.

=== Legal Status of the Brahmo (Adi Dharma) Religion ===
In 1901 (Bhagwan Koer & Ors v J.C.Bose & Ors, 31 Cal 11, 30 ELR IA 249) the Privy Council (Britain's highest judicial authority) upholds the finding of the High Court of the Punjab that the vast majority of Brahmo religionists are not Hindus and have their own religion unlike Sikhs. Debendranath Tagore was held to be the founder of the Brahmo religion. The Court distinguished Brahmo "religionists" from "followers" of the Brahmo Samaj who continue to retain their Hinduism.

In 1916 the Indian Civil Services Ethnography Administration Surveyor R. V. Russell examines in detail and publishes that Brahmo Samaj is indeed a religion (and differentiates it from "sects").

In 1949 the Government of India passes the "Hindu Marriages Validity Act". Despite discussion in Parliament Brahmos are not brought within the scope of this Law.

In 1955 the Government of India passes the "Hindu Code" (a comprehensive set of laws for Hindus). Again despite discussion in Parliament, Brahmo religionists are not brought within the scope of these laws which, however, now become applicable to Hindus who are also followers of the Brahmo Samaj.

In 2002, Bangladesh enacted a law recognising Brahmo religionists and Brahmo marriages to Hindus, Jains, Sikhs and Buddhists.

On 5 May 2004 the Supreme Court of India by order of the Chief Justice dismissed the Government of West Bengal's 30-year litigation to get Brahmos classified as Hindus. The matter had previously been heard by an 11 Judge Constitution Bench of the Court (the second largest bench in the Court's history).

=== Future of Adi Dharma ===
The Adi Dharma movement of the Brahmo religion is today the largest of the Brahmo developments with over eight million adherents. Adi Dharma has spawned not only the Indian National Congress party but also the Hindutva agenda of their opposition. Its radical contribution to India's polity was summed up by a President of India:

It is ironic that a small dedicated group of outcaste twice born Brahmins of the highest caste of Bengal setting out to rid India of caste and prejudice have instead engendered a national Constitution which perpetuates a divisively violent Casteism in Hindu religion which tears the social fabric of India apart especially in the field of education.

== See also ==
- Ad-Dharmi
- Tattwabodhini Patrika
- Ayyathan Gopalan
