= Brahmo Samaj =

Hindu socio-cultural reform movement

- Scripture: Brahmo Dharma
- Theology: Monotheism
- Moderator: Raja Ram Mohan Roy
- Leader: Debendranath Tagore
- Associations: Brahmo Samaj (Adi Brahmo Samaj and Sadharan Brahmo Samaj)
- Founder: Raja Ram Mohan Roy; Dwarakanath Tagore
- Origin: 20 August 1828 (198 years ago); Calcutta, British India
- Other name: Brahmo Sabha
- Official website: brahmosamaj.in

Brahmo Samaj (Note: Bengali pronunciation: [bram.ho ʃɔ.mad͡ʒ]) is the societal component of Brahmoism, which began as a monotheistic reformist movement during the Bengal Renaissance.

It was one of the most influential religious movements in India and made a significant contribution to the making of modern India. It was started at Calcutta (Kolkata) on 20 August 1828 by Raja Ram Mohan Roy and Dwarkanath Tagore as reformation of the prevailing customs of the time (specifically Kulin practices) and began the Bengal Renaissance of the 19th century pioneering all religious, social and educational advance of the Bengali community in the 19th century. Its Trust Deed was made in 1830 formalising its inception and it was duly and publicly inaugurated in January 1830 by the consecration of the first house of prayer, now known as the Adi Brahmo Samaj. From the Brahmo Samaj springs Brahmoism, the most recent of legally recognised religions in India and Bangladesh, reflecting its foundation on reformed spiritual Hinduism with vital elements of Christian-Islamic faith and practice.

== Etymology ==
The Brahmo Samaj literally denotes community (Sanskrit: 'samaj') of men who have knowledge of Brahman, the ultimate reality. In reality Brahmo Samaj does not discriminate between caste, creed or religion and is an assembly of all sorts and descriptions of people without distinction, meeting publicly for the sober, orderly, religious and devout adoration of "The Nameless, Eternal, Immutable Being who is the Author and Preserver of the Universe."

== Doctrine ==
The following doctrines, as noted in Renaissance of Hinduism, are common to all varieties and offshoots of the Brahmo Samaj:

- Brahmo Samajists denied that any scripture could enjoy the status of ultimate authority transcending human reason and conscience.
- Brahmo Samajists have no faith in Avatars (incarnations)
- Brahmo Samajists denounce polytheism and idol-worship.
- Brahmo Samajists are against the caste system.
- Brahmo Samajists took no definite stand on the doctrine of karma and transmigration of soul and left it to individual Brahmos to believe either way.

== Divisions of Brahmo Samaj ==
- Adi Brahmo Samaj
- Sadharan Brahmo Samaj

=== Anusthanic versus Ananusthanic (Non-Anusthanic) Brahmos ===
Anusthanic Brahmos comprise Adi Brahmos, Adi Dharmaites and many Sadharan Brahmos. Anusthanic Brahmos are exclusively adherents of the Brahmo religion and have no other faith.

The concept of the soul is anathema to Anusthanic Brahmos, which they consider to have been ruled out by the "1861 Anusthan" and they instead refer to the soul as "being". Every "being", which they consider immortal, is a part of God, who they see as the singularity, author and preserver of existence. "Beings" are sent out by God for a mission, "Kriya" on completion of which the "being" reintegrates (re-absorbs) into God.

For Anusthanic Brahmos the next step after death is this reintegration, re-absorption and renewal with God.

This corresponds to the 2nd "Adi" Prime Principle:

Being is created from Singularity. Being is renewed to Singularity. Being exists to be one again with Loving Singularity.

Ananusthanic (Non-Anusthanic Brahmos) believe in the concept of immortal souls eternally progressing towards God. This implies a karmic and fatalistic belief, which is different to Kriayic Brahmoism.

== History and timeline ==
=== Brahmo Sabha ===
On 20 August 1828 the first assembly of the Brahmo Sabha was held at the North Calcutta house of Firingi Kamal Bose. This day was celebrated by Brahmos as Bhadrotsab (ভাদ্রোৎসব Bhadrotshôb; "Bhadro celebration"). These meetings were open to all people irrespective of religion, caste, creed, gender. The format of worship was defined by Raja Ram Mohan Roy – which included reading of the Vedas by two Telegu Brahmins, followed by an explanation of Vedanta and Upanishads in Bengali by Utsavananda Bidyabagish, followed by Brahmasangeet composed by Rammohun or his friends. The songs were performed by top classical musical exponents Krishnaprasad and Bishnu Chakraborty and percussion was played by the country's top maestro Golam Abbas.

On 8 January 1830 influential progressive members of the closely related Kulin Brahmin clan scurrilously described as Pirali Brahmin (i.e. ostracised for service in the Mughal Nizaamat of Bengal) of Tagore (Thakur) and Roy Zameendar family, mutually executed the Trust Deed of Brahmo Sabha for the first Adi Brahmo Samaj (place of worship) on Chitpore Road (now Rabindra Sarani), Kolkata, India with Ram Chandra Vidyabagish as first resident superintendent.

On 23 January 1830 or 11th Magh, the Adi Brahmo premises were publicly inaugurated (with about 500 Brahmins and 1 Englishman present). This day is celebrated by Brahmos as Maghotsab (মাঘোৎসব Maghotshôb "Magh celebration").

In November 1830 Rammohun Roy left for England. Akbar II had conferred the title of 'Raja' to Rammohun Roy.

=== Brief eclipse of Brahmo Samaj ===
By the time of Rammohun's death in 1833 near Bristol (UK), attendance at the Samaj dwindled. Dwarkanath Tagore provided the funds for the upkeep of the Samaj and Ram Chandra Vidyabagish kept up the flame burning, and arrived each week to perform the divine service as laid out by Rammohun.

=== Tattwabodhini period ===
On 6 October 1839, Debendranath Tagore, son of Dwarkanath Tagore, established Tattvaranjini Sabha which was shortly thereafter renamed the Tattwabodhini ("Truth-seekers") Sabha. Initially confined to immediate members of the Tagore family, in two years it mustered over 500 members. In 1840, Debendranath published a Bangla translation of Katha Upanishad. A modern researcher describes the Sabha's philosophy as modern middle-class (bourgeois) Vedanta. Among its first members were the "two giants of Hindu reformation and Bengal Renaissance", Akshay Kumar Datta, who in 1839 emerged from the life of an "anonymous squalor-beset individual", and Ishwar Chandra Vidyasagar, the "indigenous moderniser".

=== First Covenant and merger with the Tattwabodhini Sabha ===
On 7th Pous 1765 Shaka (1843) Debendranath Tagore and twenty other Tattwabodhini stalwarts were formally invited by Pt. Vidyabagish into the Trust of Brahmo Sabha. The Pous Mela at Santiniketan starts on this day. From this day forth, the Tattwabodhini Sabha dedicated itself to promoting Ram Mohan Roy's creed. The other Brahmins who swore the First Covenant of Brahmoism are:

- Shridhar Bhattacharya
- Shyamacharan Bhattacharya
- Brajendranath Tagore
- Girindranath Tagore, brother of Debendranath Tagore and father of Ganendranath Tagore
- Anandachandra Bhattacharya
- Taraknath Bhattacharya
- Haradev Chattopadhyaya, the future father-in-law to Mahacharya Hemendranath Tagore
- Shyamacharan Mukhopadhyaya
- Ramnarayan Chattopadhyaya
- Sashibhushan Mukhopadhyaya

=== Branches of Brahma Samaj ===
In 1861 the first branch of Brahmo Samaj was founded at Lahore by Nobin Roy. It included many Bengalis from the Lahore Bar Association. Many branches were opened later in the Punjab, at Quetta, Rawalpindi, Amritsar etc.

=== First secession ===
Disagreement with Debendranath Tagore and Keshub Chandra Sen came to a head publicly between the period of 1 August 1865 till November 1866 and the followers of Keshub created the "Brahmo Samaj of India". This period is also referred to in the histories of the secessionists as the "First Schism". Keshab Chandra Sen was influenced by Sri Ramakrishna teachings and gradually adopted them in his personal life and philosophy.

=== Current status and number of adherents ===
While the various Calcutta sponsored movements declined after 1920 and faded into obscurity after the Partition of India, the Adi Dharm creed has expanded and is now the 9th largest of India's enumerated religions with 7.83 million adherents, heavily concentrated between the states of Punjab and Uttar Pradesh. In the Indian census of 2001 only 177 persons declared themselves a "Brahmo", but the number of subscriber members to Brahmo Samaj is somewhat larger at around 20,000 members.

== Social and religious reform ==
In matters of social reform the Brahmo Samaj attacked many dogmas and superstitions. It condemned the prevailing Hindu prejudice against sailing across sea and going abroad (Kala Pani). The Samaj condemned practice of Sati (burning of widows), discouraged child marriage and polygamy, and crusaded for widow remarriage. The Samaj attacked casteism and untouchability.

After the controversy of underage marriage of Keshub Chunder Sen's daughter Suniti Devi, the Special Marriages Act of 1872 was enacted to set the minimum age of 14 years for marriage of girls. All Brahmo marriages were thereafter solemnised under this law. Many Indians resented the requirement of the affirmation "I am not a Hindu, nor a Muslim, nor a Christian" for solemnising a marriage under this Act. The requirement of this declaration was imposed by Henry James Sumner Maine, legal member of Governor General's Council appointed by Britain. The 1872 Act was repealed by the Special Marriage Act, 1954 under which any person of any religion could marry. The Hindu Marriage Act, 1955 applies to all Hindus (including "followers" of the Brahmo Samaj) but not to the adherents of the Brahmo religion.

=== Second secession ===
Differences arose between Keshub Chandra Sen and the band of young people who called themselves "Samadarshi". The difference arose due to the autocratic handling of the works of the Brahmo Samaj by Keshub Chandra Sen. The differences came to a head with the Coochbehar marriage. A meeting was called in Town Hall of Calutta on 15 May 1878 and the Sadharan Brahmo Samaj came into existence with Anandamohan Bose as president, Shib Chandra Deb, Sivanath Sastri, Umesh Chandra Dutta, Gurucharan Mahalanobish serving as office bearers.

== See also ==
- History of Bengal
- Arya Samaj
- Brahmo
- New religious movement
- Prarthana Samaj
- Tattwabodhini Patrika
- Brahmosamaj Kerala and Dr. Ayyathan Gopalan
