= Brahmoism =

Hindu religious movement from mid-19th century Bengal, India

- Classification: Hinduism
- Scripture: Brahmo Dharma
- Theology: Monotheism
- Pradhanacharya-1: Raja Ram Mohan Roy
- Pradhanacharya-2: Dwarkanath Tagore
- Pradhanacharya-3: Debendranath Tagore
- Associations: Brahmo Samaj (Adi Brahmo Samaj and Sadharan Brahmo Samaj)
- Founder: Ram Mohan Roy
- Origin: 28 August 1828 (197 years ago); Calcutta, British India
- Official website: true.brahmosamaj.in

Brahmoism is a Hindu religious movement which originated from the mid-19th century Bengali Renaissance, the nascent Indian independence movement. Adherents, known as Brahmos (singular Brahmo), are mainly of Indian or Bangladeshi origin or nationality.

The Brahmo Samaj, literally the "Society of Brahman", was founded as a movement by Raja Ram Mohan Roy.

== Fundamental principles ==
The Brahmo articles of faith derive from the Fundamental (Adi) Principles of the Adi Brahmo Samaj religion.

- On God: There is always Infinite (limitless, undefinable, imperceivable, indivisible) Singularity – Immanent and Transcendent Singular Author and Preserver of Existence – "He" whose Love is manifest everywhere and in everything, in the fire and in the water, from the smallest plant to the mightiest oak.
- On Being: Being is created from Singularity. Being is renewed by Singularity. Being exists to be one (again) with Singularity. (See Tat Tvam Asi).
- On Intelligent Existence: Righteous (worshipful, intelligent, moral) actions alone rule (regulate [preserve]) Existence against Chaos (loss [decay, return, pervading emptiness]). Knowledge (Intelligence [reason, sentience, intuition]) of Pure Conscience (light within) is the One (Supreme) Ruler (authority [law, dharma]) of Existence with no symbol (creation [scripture, book, object]) or intermediary (being [teacher, messiah, ruler]).
- On Love: Respect all creations and beings but never venerate (worship) them for only Singularity can be Loved (adored, worshipped).

=== Articles of faith ===
The Articles of faith for Brahmos are:

- Brahmos embrace righteousness as the only way of life.
- Brahmos embrace truth, knowledge, reason, free will and virtuous intuition (observation) as guides.
- Brahmos embrace secular principles but oppose sectarianism and imposition of religious belief into governance (especially propagation of religious belief by government).
- Brahmos embrace the co-existence of Brahmo principles with governance, but oppose all governance in conflict with Brahmo principles.
- Brahmos reject narrow theism (especially polytheism), idolatry and symbolism.
- Brahmos reject the need for formal rituals, priests or places (church, temple, mosque) for worship.
- Brahmos reject dogma and superstition.
- Brahmos reject scriptures as authority.
- Brahmos reject revelations, prophets, gurus, messiahs, or avatars as authority.
- Brahmos reject bigotry and irrational distinctions like caste, creed, colour, race, religion which divide beings.
- Brahmos reject all forms of totalitarianism.
- Brahmos examine the prevalent notion of "sin".
- Brahmos examine the prevalent notions of "heaven" or "hell".
- Brahmos examine the prevalent notion of "salvation".

Adherence to these articles are required only of Adi Brahmos or such Sadharan Brahmos who accept Adi-ism i.e. Trust Deed of Brahmo Sabha (1830). Brahmoism is considered a synthesis of Hinduism, Islam and Unitarianism.

== History ==
While Raja Ram Mohan Roy aimed at reforming the Hindu religion through Unitarianism, his successor Maharshi Debendranath Tagore in 1850 rejected the infallibility of the Vedas. Tagore tried to retain some Hindu customs, but a series of schisms eventually resulted in the formation of the breakaway Sadharan Brahmo Samaj in 1878.

In 1901, a decision of the Privy Council of British India found that "the vast majority of Brahmo religionists are not Hindus and have their own religion."

The Brahma Dharma was first codified by Debendranath Tagore with the formulation of the Brahmo Dharma Beej and publication of the Brahma Dharma, a book of 1848 in two parts. The Brahma Dharma is the source of every Brahmo's spiritual faith and reflects Brahmo repudiation of the Hindu Vedas as authority and the shift away from Ram Mohan Roy's Unitarian version of God. The traditional seed principles and Debendranath's Brahmo Dharma (or religious and moral law) now stand evolved as the "Fundamental Principles of Brahmoism" and are supplemented by precise evolving rules for adherents, akin to "Articles of Faith" which regulate the Brahmo way of life. In addition the assembly of Brahmos (and also Brahmo Samajists) for meeting or worship is always consonant with the Trust Principles of 1830 or its derivatives.

== Brief history and timeline ==
- 1828 : Raja Ram Mohun Roy establishes Brahma Sabha (assembly of Brahmins).
- 1829 : Asiatic Society admits the first Indians to its membership, the first of whom are Ramkamal Sen, Dwarkanath Tagore, Rajchandra Das and Prasanna Coomar Tagore.
- 1830 : Dwarkanath Tagore, Prasanna Coomar Tagore and Ors. establish the first Brahmo Place for Worship through a legal Trust Deed at Chitpur (Jorasanko Kolkata India). Ram Mohun departs for Britain.
- 1833 : Ram Mohun dies in Bristol.
- 1839 : Debendranath Tagore forms Tattwabodhini (Tattvaranjini) Sabha, the "Truth & Life Purpose Seekers" association on 6 October 1839.
- 1843 : Tattwabodini Sabha merged with Brahmo Sabha and Calcutta Brahmo Samaj established. Dwarkanath Tagore founds the Great Western Bengal Railway Co. in conflict with the State.
- 1850 : Publication of Brahma Dharma book in 2 parts by Debendranath. Repudiation of Vedic infallibility, separation from Hinduism, establishment of the new religion.
- 1855 : Keshub Chunder Sen founds "The British India Society" later associated with Christian missionaries James Long and Charles Dall. Dall, a roving Unitarian missionary, is in a troubled marriage in Boston with Caroline Wells Healey Dall, suffering a series of mental depressions, and is sufficiently persuaded to grant his wife a Boston divorce by sailing to India forever as the first foreign Unitarian missionary.
- 1856 : Devendranath Thakur proceeds to hills of Simla.
- 1857 : Debendranath informs Unitarian preacher Charles Dall that he is no longer welcome at Calcutta Brahmo Samaj, and that "He would not hear the name of Jesus spoken in the Samaj." Dall then forms the Rammohun Roy Society to wean away the liberal Brahmos from Debendranath. Keshub Sen then subscribes to Calcutta Brahmo Samaj while Devendranath is away in Simla. The Indian Mutiny erupts, almost every Trustee of Brahma Samaj supports the Crown while seeking exemplary punishment for the mutineers.
- 1860 : Charles Dall now openly attacks Debendranath and affiliates to liberal Brahmo neo-Christian group by promoting Theodore Parker and William Channing's methods to convert Hindus to Christianity.
- 1866 : The First Brahmo Schism and Calcutta Brahmo Samaj is renamed as Adi (First) Brahmo Samaj to distinguish it from progressive breakaway group.
- 1871 : Adi Brahmo Samaj leaders publicly oppose the progressive faction over the divisive Brahmo Marriage Bill, 1871 with Debendranath stating "We are Brahmos first, and Indians or Hindus second."
- 1872 : The Marriage Bill is ostensibly not limited to Brahmos and enacted as the Special Marriages Act (Act III) of 1872. A declaration is required stating "I am not a Hindu or Muslim or Christian or Jew" to marry under this law which is used almost exclusively by Brahmos.
- 1878 : The breakaway faction splits again, the majority form the middle-path Sadharan (General) Brahmo Samaj and are formally welcomed back to Brahmoism by Debendranath Tagore and Rajnarayan Basu of the Adi Samaj. The eminent leaders of Sadharan Brahmo Samaj at the time include Sivanath Sastri, Ananda Mohan Bose and Sib Chandra Deb.
- 1898 : First branch of Brahmosamaj (Calicut) (Now Ayyathan School which runs under the patronage of Brahmo Samaj at Jail Road, Calicut) was founded by Ayyathan Gopalan a great social reformer and founder of Sugunavardhini movement in Kerala.
- 1910 : Translation of "Bible of Brahmo Samaj" – "Brahmo Dharma" by Maharshi Debendranath Tagore into Malayalam.
- 1924 : Second Branch of Brahmo Samaj in Kerala was set up by Ayyathan Gopalan at Alappuzha (Kerala) Poonthoppu, Kommady (now Grihalakshmi Gandhi Smaraka Seva Aangam).

== See also ==
- Adi Dharm
- Ayyathan Gopalan
- Hindu reform movements
- History of Bengal
- New religious movement
- Prarthana Samaj
- Tattwabodhini Patrika
