= Sivanath Shastri =

Indian Social Reformer

Sivanath Sastri
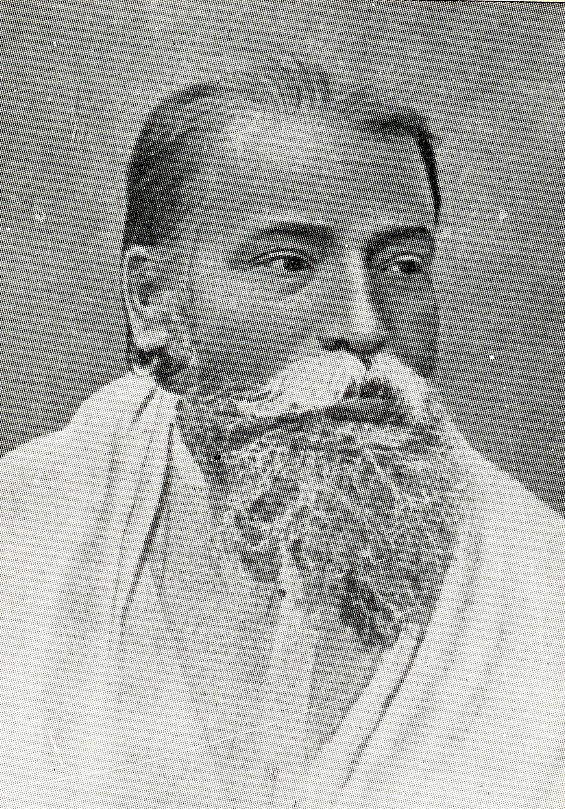
- Born: 31 January 1847; Subhashgram, Calcutta, Bengal Presidency, British India
- Died: 30 September 1919 (aged 72); Calcutta, Bengal Presidency, British India
- Education: Sanskrit Collegiate School
- Occupations: Educationist, Social Reformer, Writer
- Organization: Brahmo Samaj

Sivanath Shastri or Sibanath Sastri (31 January 1848 – 30 September 1919) was a Bengali social reformer, writer, translator, scholar, editor philoshoper and historian.
