= Prothoma Kadambini =

2020 Indian Bengali television period drama series

- Genre: Biopic; Historical; Social; Romance; Drama
- Developed by: Rajib Gangopadhyay; Deepanwita Gangopadhyay
- Screenplay by: Sharbari Ghoshal; Barun Chattopadhyay
- Directed by: Swornendu Samaddar; Shamik Bose; Anupam Hari
- Presented by: Shree Venkatesh Films
- Starring: Solanki Roy; Honey Bafna
- Country of origin: India
- Original language: Bengali
- No. of episodes: 258

Production
- Producers: Shrikant Mohta; Mahendra Soni
- Production location: Kolkata
- Camera setup: Multi-camera
- Running time: 22 minutes
- Production company: Shree Venkatesh Films

Original release
- Network: Star Jalsha
- Release: 16 March 2020 – 28 February 2021

Prothoma Kadambini is an Indian Bengali television biographical period drama based on the biography of the first practising female physician of British-ruled India and South Asia, Doctor Kadambini Ganguly. The show aired on the Bengali General Entertainment Channel Star Jalsha and is also available on digital platform Hotstar. It premiered on 16 March 2020. The show is produced by Shree Venkatesh Films and stars Solanki Roy and Honey Bafna in lead roles. The show went to off air on 28 February 2021.

== Plot ==
Kadambini Ganguly (née Basu), fights her way to pursue medicine through the narrow doors that education kept shut to women. She eventually becomes a successful doctor with the help of her school teacher, who later became her husband, the social reformer Dwarakanath Ganguly. Even after the demise of her husband, she continues her job and with earnest attempt to reform the society alongside taking care of her family until she becomes an immortal figure of Indian history.

== Cast ==
=== Main ===
- Solanki Roy as Dr. Kadambini Ganguly (née Bose) aka Bini
  - Meghan Chakraborty as young Bini
- Honey Bafna as Dwarakanath Ganguly aka Dwarka

=== Recurring ===
- Animesh Bhaduri as Brojokishore Basu, Bini's father
- Bidipta Chakraborty as Kanak Devi, Bini's mother
- Pritha Roy as Soudamini Basu, Bini's younger sister
- Rohit Samanta / Fahim Mirza as Monomohun Ghose
- Rupsa Chatterjee as Swarnalata Ghose
- Prantik Banerjee as Nanda, Bini's paternal uncle
- Sananda Basak as Nanda's wife
- Kaushiki Guha as Bini's elder paternal aunt
- Suchismita Chowdhury as Bini's younger paternal aunt
- Brishti Banerjee as Labanya, Bini's Rangadidi
- Payel De as Bhabosundari Ganguly (Devi), Dwarkanath's first wife
- Rupsha Mondal as Bidhumukhi Ray Chowdhury (née Ganguly), Dwarakanath's eldest daughter
- Sanmitra Bhaumik as Upendrakishore Ray Chowdhury
- Samantak Dyuti Maitra / Nilotpal Banerjee as Satish Ganguly
- Kheyali Dastidar as Udaytara Ganguly, Dwarakanath's mother
- Sritama Bhattacharjee as Agomoni, Dwarakanath's younger sister
- Shampa Banerjee as Promila, Dwarakanath's another younger sister, Agomoni's elder sister
- Dwaipayan Das as Surendranath Ganguly aka Suren, Dwaraka's cousin
- Jagriti Goswami Ghatak as Shashibala, Bhabosundari's sister & Suren's wife
- Gulshanara Khatun as Surobala, Kadambini's personal assistant
- Rahul Dev Bose as Dr. Mahim Sen, a doctor
- Bhaswar Chatterjee / Anindya Banerjee as Dr. Rajendra Chandra Chandra, Bini's medical college teacher
- Bhaskar Banerjee as Raybahadur Sardakanta Deb
- Avijit Sarkar as Dr.Bose
- Sarbadaman Som as Dr. Sanyal
- Krishnendu Adhikari as Shibnath Shastri
- Debomoy Mukherjee as Ananda Mohan Bose
- Avijit Debroy as Dr. Annada Khastagir
- Rumpa Chatterjee as Manoroma Das, a neighbor of Ganguly family at Cornwallis street house
- Tarun Chakraborty as Rasbihari Das, Manoroma's husband
- Senjuti Sen as Bindubasini, another neighbor at Cornwallis street house
- Debjoy Mallick as Surendranath Banerjee
- Debesh Chattopadhyay as Durga Mohan Das
- Sujata Daw as Brahmamoyee Debi, Durgamohan's first wife
- Ivana Dutta as Miss Annette Akroyd
- Sutirtha Saha as Keshab Chandra Sen
- Prantik Choudhury as Ishwar Chandra Vidyasagar
- Sayani Sengupta Dutta as Soroju, Sardakanta's granddaughter
- Priya Malakar as Sarala Roy (Das), Durgamohan's elder daughter
- Nisha Poddar as Abala Bose(Das) Durgamohan's younger daughter
- Prapti Chatterjee as Swarnaprabha Bose, Ananda Mohan's wife
- Kaushambi Chakraborty as Horosundori Devi
- Tanushree Saha as Nistarini
- Ananya Sen as Chandramukhi Basu
- Riya Roy as Manomoyee
- Ashmita Chakraborty as Jagattarini Sen, Dr. Mahim Sen's wife
- Rubel Ghosh as Jyotibhushan Sarkar
- Swarnodipto Ghose as Nilratan Sarkar
- Shovan Chakraborty as Shivaprashad
- Arush Dutta as Lalkamal Dutta
- Suprabhat Mukherjee as Jagannath Bhattacharya
- Writwik Mukherjee as Bagalacharan
- Anirban Paitandi as Kanailal Majumder
- Ankita Chakraborty as Anandibai Gopalrao Joshi
- Basabdatta Chatterjee as Jnanadanandini Devi
- Priyam as Rabindranath Tagore
- Diya Mukherjee as Binodini Dasi
- Akash Ghosh as Dr. Prafulla Chandra Ray
- Phalguni Chatterjee as Ramakrishna
- Mafin Chakraborty as Lady Dufferin
- Arundhati Chakraborty as Jyotirmayee Ganguly
- Arunava Dey as Probhatchandra Ganguly
- Tania Kar as Dr. Mahim Sen's sister-in-law
- Pinky Mallick as Bhabosundari's mother
- Indranil Mallick as Biren
- Chaitali Mukhopadhyay as Renubala
- Ananda S Choudhuri as Nabakumar Bose, Binodini Dasi's admirer
- Sarbari Mukherjee as Lokkhimoni Naptani, a local matchmaker in Bhagalpur
- Ratan Sarkhel as Gopal Boidyo
- Samir Kundu as Parashor Boidyo
- Pratyusha Saha as Charu

== Production ==
The show is produced by Shree Venkatesh Films. Prothoma Kadambini was on a halt after airing 5 episodes because of the restrictions on shooting of all television and film productions following the lockdown in India enforced for COVID-19 Pandemic from 18 March 2020. The telecast resumed from 15 June 2020.

It has done well in television ratings. Moreover, the show had secured its position in the top ten most viewed shows on Bengali television in 15+ Urban BARC TRP chart on the week 42, 43 and 44 in the year 2020. This biopic based on the real life story of Dr Kadambini Ganguly had ranked 8th position in Top 10 Bangla serial of 2021 that were popular in the Bengal (India) then.

== Awards and nominations ==
Date of ceremony	Award	Category	Recipient(s) and nominee(s)	Result
2021	Star Jalsha Paribaar Award 2021	Favorite Style Icon Female	Kadambini Ganguly (Solanki Roy)	Won
2021	Star Jalsha Paribaar Award 2021	Favorite Style Icon Male	Dwarakanath Ganguly (Honey Bafna)	Nominated
2021	Star Jalsha Paribaar Award 2021	Pride of Bengal (Banglar Gorbo)	Prothoma Kadombini (Shree Venkatesh Films)	Won
2021	Star Jalsha Paribaar Award 2021	Favorite Child Artist	Bini (Meghan Chakraborty)	Won
2021	Star Jalsha Paribaar Award 2021	Special Jury Award Female	Kadambini Ganguly (Solanki Roy)	Nominated
2021	Star Jalsha Paribaar Award 2021	Favorite Sister-in-law	Shashi (Jagriti Goswami Ghatak)	Nominated
2021	Kolkata Glitz Awards 2021	Notable Performance Male (Jury's Choice)	Honey Bafna	Won
2021	Kolkata Glitz Awards 2021	Notable Performance Male (Viewers Choice)	Honey Bafna	Nominated
2021	Kolkata Glitz Awards 2021	KG Icon of the Year 2021	Solanki Roy	Won
2021	Kolkata Glitz Awards 2021	Notable Performance Female (Viewers Choice)	Solanki Roy	Nominated
2021	Kolkata Glitz Awards 2021	Most Popular Onscreen Jodi	Honey Bafna Solanki Roy	Nominated
2022	Tele Academy Award 2022	Best Inspiring Character	Kadambini Ganguly (Solanki Roy)	Won
2022	Tele Academy Award 2022	Best Child Actor	Young Kadambini (Meghan Chakraborty)	Won
