= Dwarkanath Ganguly =

Bengali social reformer (1844–1898)

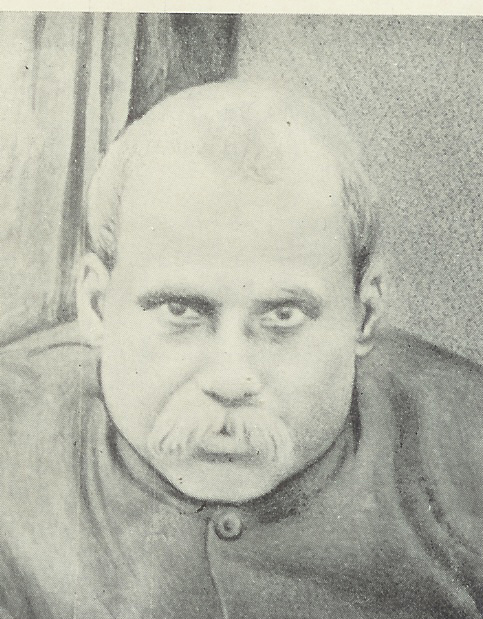
- Born: 20 April 1844; Bikrampur, Bengal Presidency, British India
- Died: 27 June 1898 (aged 54); Calcutta, Bengal, British India
- Occupations: Educator, journalist, social reformer
- Spouses: Bhaboshundori Devi (m. 1862–1866); Kadambini Ganguly (m. 1883)
- Children: 10

Dwarkanath Gangopadhyay (also known as Dwarkanath Ganguly, 20 April 1844–27 June 1898) was a Bengali Brahmo reformer. He made substantial contributions towards societal enlightenment and the emancipation of women. Ganguly dedicated his life to the latter cause, encouraging women to participate in politics and the social services. He was the husband of the first female Indian physician, Kadambini Ganguly.

== Early life ==
Ganguly was born in the village of Magurkhanda in Bikrampur pargana, south of Dhaka in present-day Bangladesh, on 20 April 1844. His father, Krishnapran Gangopadhyay, was a compassionate and humble man; his mother, Udaytara, belonged to a wealthy family and was a strong-willed woman. Ganguly was deeply influenced by his mother, who instilled in him a love of truth and justice. He began his education in the local village pathshaala. Keen to learn English, Ganguly then attended the English school in the nearby village of Kalipara. He was strongly influenced at that school by Akshay Kumar Datta's Dharma Niti, which explored social problems such as polygamy, child marriage, inter-caste marriage and widow remarriage. Ganguly, touched by the plight of Bengali women, was influenced by Dutta's belief that "the first vital step to social regeneration is liberating woman from her bondage".

== Later life and career ==
Ganguly belonged to the Kulin Brahmin clan. It was customary for Kulin men to practise polygamy, earning money from gifts presented to the groom by the bride's father. The 17-year-old Ganguly was pained, however, when he learned that the fatal poisoning of a girl by her relatives was a common practice; he vowed to be monogamous, and began to empathize with the women in his society.

Years after the death of his first wife, he married Kadambini Ganguly (née Bose, one of the first female graduates in the British Empire) in 1883. Ganguly fought for her admission to Calcutta Medical College, and Kadambini became the first female practising Indian physician.

He had ten children from both marriages. Ganguly's eldest daughter, Bidhumukhi, married Upendrakishore Ray Chowdhury (grandfather of Indian filmmaker Satyajit Ray). Jyotirmayee Gangopadhyay, his other daughter, was an educator and freedom fighter. Prabhat Chandra Ganguly followed his father into journalism and was a contemporary of Sukumar Ray, Ganguly's nephew. He was a member of Sukumar's "Monday club".

== Abalabandhab ==
Library copy of Abalabandhab

In May 1869, Ganguly launched the journal Abalabandhab (Friend of Women) in Dhaka. According to American historian David Kopf, it may have been the first journal in the world devoted solely to the liberation of women. Abalabandhab brought him recognition as a spokesman for women's social rights in society. Ganguly was a humanitarian journalist who brought to light cases of female exploitation and suffering. His writings in Abalabandhab defended women, and were moralistic and judgmental about the behaviour of educated women. The first issue dealt with a number of topics, such as self-protection, vocational training and social, political and religious issues. The second issue had an article about "Knowledge of the Yavanas in Sanskrit"; the third "Whabi religion, Rafique Mondal and Amiruddin"; the fourth "Edison and Electric Light"; the fifth "Telephone, Microphone and Phonograms", and the sixth a "System of Kindergarten Education". The seventh (and final) issue was devoted to miscellaneous topics.

The journal included articles on cooking, the scientific training of midwives improving the health of new mothers (who were usually segregated from other family members in unhealthy conditions). Abalabandhab attracted the attention of students in Calcutta – where Ganguly introduced it in 1870 – and Dhaka, especially young Brahmos (including Sivanath Shastri and his friends).

== Sadharan Brahmo Samaj ==
Ganguly was a supporter of higher education for women, including the fields of science and mathematics. He advocated equal syllabi for men and women, unlike other social reformers (such as Brahmo leader Keshub Chandra Sen) who believed that women's roles should complement those of men. Ganguly campaigned against polygamy, bigotry, purdah and child marriage. He tried to introduce changes to women's dress, and established a music school for girls. Divisions within Brahmo Samaj led to the 1878 formation of the Sadharan Brahmo Samaj, where Ganguly served several terms as secretary.

== Higher education for women ==
=== Establishment of girls' school ===
Ganguly and his associates, including Durgamohan Das and Monomohun Ghosh, argued that girls' education should be equal that for boys. He was headmaster at the Hindu Mahila Vidyalaya in Calcutta, a boarding school, supervised by Annette Akroyd. Ganguly and his associates ran the school, whose boarders included Indumati, daughter of Ramtanu Lahiri; Sarala and Abala, the daughters of Durga Mohan Das; Ganguly's daughter, Bidhumukhi, and Harasundari, the wife of Srinath Datta. Ganguly was also a teacher, dietician, guard and maintenance man.

The school was praised by the government's education department, but the Bethune School was a cause for concern. Through the intercession of Monomohun Ghose, secretary of the Bethune School Committee, a proposal to merge the two schools was approved; they merged on 1 August 1878. Among its alumnae were Swarnaprabha Basu (wife of Ananda Mohan Basu), Sarala Roy (wife of Prasanna Kumar Roy), Lady Abala Basu (wife of Jagadish Chandra Basu), Girijakumari Sen (wife of Sasipada Sen), Kadambini Ganguly (Ganguly's wife) and Hemlata Devi (daughter of Sivanath Shastri). Dwarkanath Ganguly's efforts in making of the present Bethune College, along with those of Durgamohon Das and Ananda Mohan Basu is no less than that of Bethune and Vidyasagar College.

=== Calcutta University ===
Ganguly's campaign to allow women to attend university bore fruit when Calcutta University's policy barring female students was overturned on 25 November 1876. Kadambini Basu and Chandramukhi Basu were the first two female graduates in the British Empire in 1882.

=== Mary Carpenter ===
Mary Carpenter visited India to expand women's education and welfare. Ganguly was inspired by her work to write the women's novel Suruchir Kutir, for which he received the Mary Carpenter Prize.

=== Pandita Ramabai ===
Pandita Ramabai was influenced by Ganguly and his work for female emancipation when she visited Bengal. Rambai decided to do similar work in Bombay and began in 1882 with Dwarkanath's support and guidance by forming Arya Mahila Samiti in Pune with Ramabai Ranade, Tanubai Tarkhud and Dharubai Limaye.

== National politics ==
=== Indian Association ===
The Indian Association, founded in 1876 by Surendranath Banerjee and Ananda Mohan Bose, was British India's first nationalist organization. Its objective was "promoting by every legitimate means the political, intellectual and material advancement of the people". Ganguly was the organization's associate editor.

=== Women in politics ===
After the establishment of Indian National Congress in 1885, Indian Association lost its influence. Garguly began a movement to enable women's participation in national politics, allowing female delegates at Congress meetings. Due in part to his efforts, higher education and politics were opened to women before they were opened in England.

== Journalism, nationalism and published works ==
In addition to Abalabandhab, Ganguly was a journalist who called attention to social issues. He and Krishna Kumar Mitra published Sanjivani, a weekly Bengali newspaper which tried to organize the peasants of lower Bengal. Ganguly's articles detailing the wretched conditions of tea-plantation workers in Assam eventually led the Indian National Congress to send investigators (angering the British planters) and sparked agitation against colonial rule. Unhappy with existing educational mathematics and applied science materials, he wrote health-science, geography and mathematics textbooks.

Ganguly's song, "Na jagile Bharat lalana e Bharat aar jage na jage na ..." ["Till the women of India rise, India shall not rise"], was sung at a 14 March 1907 Swadeshi movement meeting organized by Bipin Chandra Pal specifically for women. He wrote a novel, Suruchir Kutir; a journal biography of Brohmomoyee Debi (the first wife of Durga Mohon Das), and a who's who of contemporary Bengal.
