= Hindu Mahila Vidyalaya =

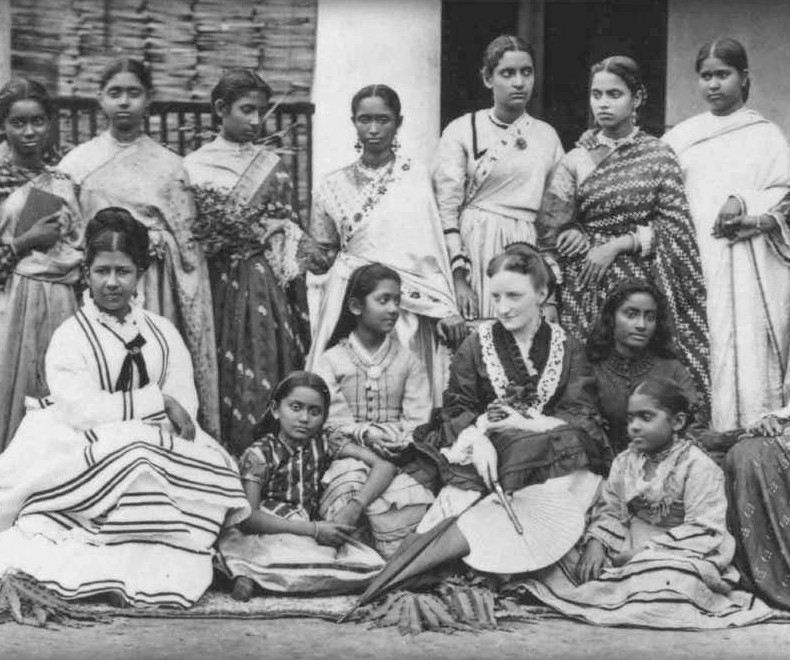
Annette Akroyd with the students of Hindu Mahila Vidyalaya, 1875

Hindu Mahila Vidyalaya (School for Hindu Women) was an all-female boarding school located at 22 Beniapukur Lane, Entally, Kolkata, India. Founded by British translator Annette Beveridge, the school was one of the first in India to provide girl students with a curriculum equivalent to that offered for boys. Sources record different dates for the establishment of the school. While Indian historian Jogesh C. Bagal records the date of establishment as 18 November 1873, American historian David Kopf mentions it as 18 September 1873.

Dwarkanath Ganguly was the headmaster. Ananda Mohan Bose and Durga Mohan Das bore the expenses of the institution. Others involved in the school were Sivanath Sastri and Monomohun Ghose. Mrs. J. B. Phear was an honorary teacher. She went to the extent of teaching her students how to eat at a table with cutlery.

After the marriage of Annette Akroyd, the school was closed in March 1876. It was revived on 1 June 1876 as Banga Mahila Vidyalaya (Bengali Women's College).

== See also ==
- List of schools in Kolkata
- List of schools in West Bengal
