= Honey Bafna =

Indian Bengali actor

- Born: Kolkata, West Bengal, India
- Occupation: Actor
- Years active: 2014–present
- Notable work: Bokul Kotha; Prothoma Kadambini; Gramer Rani Binapani; Sohag Jol; Shubho Bibaho

Honey Bafna (Born 25 July 1987) is an Indian television actor who appears in Bengali TV shows, OTT and films.

== Career ==
Coming from a completely non-acting background, Honey started his acting career in Bengali serials as a junior artist with non-credited roles. His first credited television appearance was in Star Jalsha's Bengali serial Tumi Ashbe Bole (2015), where he played the negative character of Dr. Vivaan Chakraborty. He came to be known for playing the role of 'Balaram' in Star Jalsha's mythological serial Bhakter Bhagobaan Shri Krishna, and as Rishi in Zee Bangla's popular family drama Bokul Kotha. He appeared as Dwarakanath Ganguly, in the Star Jalsha period drama Prothoma Kadambini, based on the life of Bengal's first practising lady doctor Kadambini Ganguly. Honey moved into the OTT space with a role in Hoichoi's Bodhon. Honey is marking his big screen debut with 'Swapno Uraan' directed by Tulirekha Roy.

== Personal life ==
Honey is currently single. He is a self-confessed foodie and an ardent sports enthusiast. He graduated in Mathematics from Ashutosh College and worked as a medical representative before joining the television industry. He also conducts acting workshops at a private acting school, when time permits.

== Filmography ==
=== Television ===
List of Honey Bafna television credits
Year	Title	Role	Channel	Production House	Notes
2015	Ishti Kutum		Star Jalsha		Supporting Role
2015	Tumi Asbe Bole	Dr. Vivaan Chakraborty	Star Jalsha	Vandana Films and Enterprises	Supporting Role
2016	Goyenda Ginni (Sheel Rohoshyo)	Samrat	Zee Bangla	Shree Venkatesh Films	Episodic role
2016–2017	Bhakter Bhogobaan Shri Krishna	Balram	Star Jalsha	Surinder Films	2nd Male Lead
2017–2020	Bokul Kotha	Rishi Roy	Zee Bangla	Acropoliis Entertainment	Lead Role
2020–2021	Prothoma Kadambini	Dwarkanath Ganguly	Star Jalsha	Shree Venkatesh Films	Lead Role
2021–2022	Gramer Rani Binapani	Shatadru Raychaudhuri	Star Jalsha	Boyhood Productions	Lead Role
2022–2023	Sohag Jol	Shubhrojeet Chatterjee	Zee Bangla	Bangla Talkies	Lead Role
2023	Shyama	Joy Banerjee	Sun Bangla	Surinder Films	Lead Role
2024–2026	Shubho Bibaho	Tej Basu Mallick	Star Jalsha	Acropoliis Entertainment	Lead Role
2026–Present	Babli Sundori	Binayak	Star Jalsha	Missing Screw Productions	Lead Role

=== Web series ===
List of Honey Bafna OTT credits
Year	Title	Streaming Platform	Role
2022	Bodhon	Hoichoi	Som
2022	Seven – Adoption		Dr. Bharat Roy
2022	Eken Babu – Ebar Kolkatay	Hoichoi	Bikash Sen
2023	Nikhoj	Hoichoi	Joydeep Mitra
2025	Anusandhan	Hoichoi	Arnab
2025	Nikhoj 2	Hoichoi	Joydeep Mitra
2026	Nikosh Chhaya	Hoichoi	Young Bhaduri Moshai

== Awards and recognition ==
List of awards and recognition received by Honey Bafna
Year	Award Name	Category	Notes
2019	Zee Bangla Sonar Sansar	Sera Nayok	Bokul Kotha
2019	Kolkata Glitz Fashion Awards	Glitz Icon of the Year	Bokul Kotha
2019	18th Tele Cine Awards	Best Actor in Television	Bokul Kotha
2021	Star Jalsha Parivar Award 2021	Banglar Gorbo	Prothoma Kadombini
2021	Kolkata Glitz Awards 2021	Notable Performance Male (Jury's Choice)	Prothoma Kadambini
2022	Telly Adda Awards	All Time Favorite Actor	
2025	Tele Academy Awards	Priyo Dada	Shubho Bibaho
