= Krishnagar Collegiate School =

Krishnanagar Collegiate School
- কৃষ্ণনগর কলেজিয়েট স্কুল
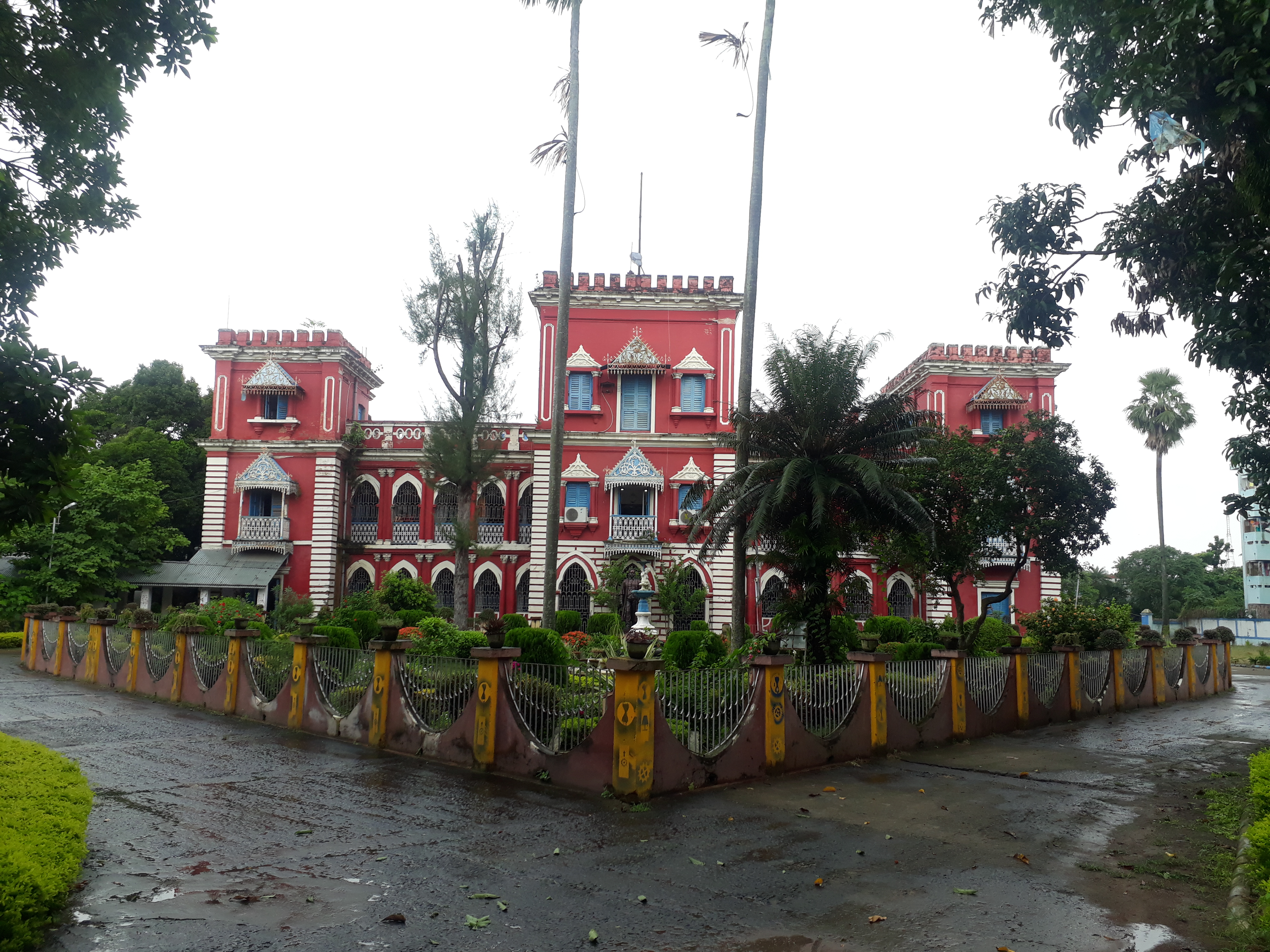
- Krishnanagar Collegiate School

Location
- 25, RN Tagore Road; Krishnanagar, West Bengal, 741101; India
- 23.4080147°N 88.4966909°E

Information
- Established: 1846; 180 years ago
- Founder: Monomohun Ghose (1843-1895)
- School board: WBBSE, WBCHSE
- Principal: Shri.TAPAS NATH (W.B.E.S)
- Staff: 49
- Faculty: 41
- Grades: 1-12
- Gender: Male
- Age range: 7-19
- Enrolment: Lottery and Merit Based
- Language: BENGALI
- Campus type: Urban
- Colours: Grey, white uniform
- Affiliation: WBBSE, WBCHSE

Krishnanagar Collegiate School is a senior-secondary school and one of the oldest schools in West Bengal, situated in the city of Krishnanagar in Nadia district.

== History ==
The school building was donated by Monomohun Ghose, a famous barrister and nationalist leader. The main school building built with red bricks with a tinge of Anglo-Indian architecture is itself a place of visit in the city of Krishnanagar. The school is more than 170 years old, established in 1846 in Krishnanagar, Nadia. The first principal of the school was David Lester Richardson, who later served as the principle of Presidency College, Kolkata. The school started with three European and ten Indian teachers which included the likes of Ramtanu Lahiri and Madanmohan Tarkalankar. Beni Madhab Das, teacher of Subhash Chandra Bose at Ravenshaw Collegiate School also taught here.

== See also ==
- Education in India
- List of schools in India
- Education in West Bengal
- Monomohun Ghose
