= Jyotirmayee Gangopadhyay =

Bengali educationist, feminist, and freedom fighter

- জ্যোতির্ময়ী গঙ্গোপাধ্যায়
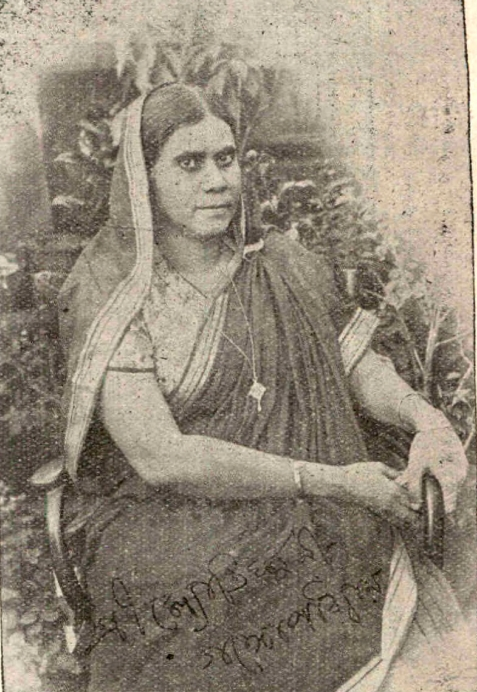
- Born: 25 January 1889; Calcutta, Bengal Presidency, British India
- Died: 22 November 1945 (aged 56); Calcutta, Bengal Presidency, British India
- Education: Bethune School
- Occupations: Social activist, politician
- Movement: Indian Independence Movement
- Parent(s): Dwarkanath Ganguly (father), Kadambini Ganguly (mother)

Jyotirmayee Gangopadhyay (1889–1945) was a Bengali educationist, feminist, and a member of the Brahmo Samaj.

== Early life ==
Jyotirmayee was born on 25 January 1889 in Kolkata, Bengal Presidency, British Raj. Her father Dwarkanath Ganguly was a social reformer, a leader of the Brahmo Samaj and an Indian Nationalist and her mother Kadambini Devi was the first female student from University of Kolkata to graduate in a medical field.

== Career ==
Jyotirmayee graduated from Brahmo Balika Shikshalaya (Brahmo Girls' School) and completed her B.A. in the Bethune College of Kolkata. In 1908 she completed her M.A. in philosophy from the University of Kolkata. She taught at the Bethune Collegiate School and after that in the Ravenshaw College in Cuttack, Odisha. She moved to Sri Lanka to join the Women's College as its principal. In 1920 she served as the principal of Jullundur Kanya Mahavidyalay In 1925 she served as the principal of Brahmo Girls' School and the next year in Vidyasagar Bani Bhavan. She joined the Buddhist College, Ceylon in 1929. She joined the Non-Cooperation movement in the early 1920s.

Jyotirmayee raised a female volunteer corp for the Indian National Congress. In 1926 she started the Students' Association for Social Service. She joined the Bengal Provincial Congress Committee and the Satyagraha movement. She served as the vice-president of the Women's Satyagraha Committee. In 1930 and 1932 she was jailed for her involvement in the Satyagraha movement. She was a founding member of the Aryasthan Insurance Company. She was elected city councilor to the Kolkata Municipal Corporation. In 1942 she was arrested for her role in the Quit India Movement.

== Death ==
Jyotirmayee was killed by police firing on 22 November 1945 while with a procession of students that was protesting the death of Rameshwar Banerjee.
