= Nikhoj =

Indian Bengali murder mystery thriller series

- Release poster
- Genre: Murder mystery Thriller
- Written by: Ayan Chakraborti
- Screenplay by: Ayan Chakraborti
- Directed by: Ayan Chakraborti
- Starring: Swastika Mukherjee; Tota Roy Choudhury
- Composer: Rupam Islam
- Country of origin: India
- Original language: Bengali
- No. of seasons: 2
- No. of episodes: 14

Production
- Producers: Siddhant Sheth, Abhishek Daga
- Cinematography: Ramyadip Saha
- Editor: Sanglap Bhowmik
- Camera setup: Single-camera
- Production company: Shree Venkatesh Films

Original release
- Release: 2023 – present

Nikhoj (transl. Missing) is an Indian Bengali murder mystery thriller web series written and directed by Ayan Chakraborti. Starring Swastika Mukherjee and Tota Roy Chowdhury in the lead roles, the series revolves around investigating the disappearance of Swastika's daughter.

Produced by Shree Venkatesh Films, the cinematography of the series was done by Ramyadip Saha while Sanglap Bhowmik handled the editing. Rupam Islam served as the music director for the series. Two seasons of the series are streaming on the Bengali OTT platform Hoichoi.

== Overview ==
Nikhoj revolves around investigating the sudden disappearance of DCP Brinda Basu's daughter, Diti. News anchor Romit Sen, Diti's boss also becomes a suspect. The first season centers on the initial inquiry, dealing with the inconsistencies in statements and evidence. In the second season, the narrative proceeds with new suspects. Brinda continues her investigation, balancing her professional duty and personal turmoil. Ultimately, the series uncovers the truth behind the disappearance.

== Cast ==
Portrayed by	Character	1	2
Swastika Mukherjee	Brinda Basu, Deputy Commissioner of Kolkata Police	Main
Tota Roy Choudhury	Romit Sen, prominent news anchor and Diti's boss	Main
Somashri Bhattacharyya	Diti, Brinda's daughter	Main
Koneenica Banerjee	Gargi Sen, Romit Sen's wife	Recurring
Saoli Chattopadhyay	Sahana, Brinda's assistant	Recurring
Lokenath De	Inspector Samanta, Brinda's co-worker	Recurring
Pratik Dutta	Vijay, Diti's co-worker	Recurring
Priyanka Mondal	—	Recurring
Paran Bandyopadhyay	—	Recurring
Khas Koushik	—	Recurring
Honey Bafna	Joydeep, Diti's toxic lover Sudeep's elder brother and lawyer	Recurring
Rajatava Dutta	Ananta Chatterjee, Brinda's mentor and encounter specialist	None	Recurring

== Production ==
=== Announcement ===
An announcement video for the first season was released on 7 July 2023, revealing the lead cast of Swastika Mukherjee and Tota Roy Chowdhury, along with the release date. Official poster of Season 1 was released on 27 June 2023. This marked collaboration between Swastika and Tota after 90 Ghanta in 2006. On 15 April 2024, the second season, "Nikhoj 2" was announced along with 13 other shows, under the announcement titled as "Best of Bengal".

=== Development ===
"I prefer taking some time between each project. Writing a screenplay takes a lot of time for me. Besides, I want to handle the job of directing a film or a web series with patience."

— Ayan Chakraborti during an interview, regarding why he took a long gap of three years since his last web series The Judgement Day (2020)

Swastika Mukherjee said in an interview "I play the character of Brinda Basu, DCP Lalbazar. The story delves into her life when she faces the biggest challenge in her professional and personal life. Her daughter goes missing and she takes charge of the investigation. It becomes tricky as none of the identities ideally should supersede the other. She has to strike a balance."

In Nikhoj, Swastika played the role of a police officer for the first time in her carrier.

=== Filming ===
A short scene in the first season was filmed at Belgachia Rajbari. The major filming for the first season took place in the summers of April and May 2023. To manage the heat, coolers were arranged on the sets. Often, shooting was halted in order to dry the costumes which were completely drenched in sweat. Filming of second season started on 5 May 2024. Most of the filming was completed within May 2024. The mid-May schedules were joined by Koneenica Banerjee.

== Episodes ==
=== Overview ===
Series	Episodes	Originally released
1	6	11 August 2023
2	8	10 January 2025

=== Season 1 (2023) ===
No.	Title	Directed by	Written by	Original release date
1	"First blood"	Ayan Chakraborti	Ayan Chakraborti	August 11, 2023
2	"Missing girl"	Ayan Chakraborti	Ayan Chakraborti	August 11, 2023
3	"Single mother"	Ayan Chakraborti	Ayan Chakraborti	August 11, 2023
4	"Toxic relationship"	Ayan Chakraborti	Ayan Chakraborti	August 11, 2023
5	"The sweeper"	Ayan Chakraborti	Ayan Chakraborti	August 11, 2023
6	"Hit and run"	Ayan Chakraborti	Ayan Chakraborti	August 11, 2023

=== Season 2 (2025) ===
No.	Title	Directed by	Written by	Original release date
1	"The Mentors"	Ayan Chakraborti	Ayan Chakraborti	January 10, 2025
2	"The Conspirators"	Ayan Chakraborti	Ayan Chakraborti	January 10, 2025
3	"The Mysterious Red Car"	Ayan Chakraborti	Ayan Chakraborti	January 10, 2025
4	"Death of An Eyewitness"	Ayan Chakraborti	Ayan Chakraborti	January 10, 2025
5	"Memory Loss"	Ayan Chakraborti	Ayan Chakraborti	January 10, 2025
6	"New Suspect List"	Ayan Chakraborti	Ayan Chakraborti	January 10, 2025
7	"Truth Revealed"	Ayan Chakraborti	Ayan Chakraborti	January 10, 2025
8	"Search Ends"	Ayan Chakraborti	Ayan Chakraborti	January 10, 2025

== Marketing and release ==
The trailer of Nikhoj Season 1 was released on 26 July 2023. The trailer of Nikhoj Season 2 was released on 1 January 2025.

Nikhoj Season 1 was streamed on 11 August 2023, on the Bengali OTT platform Hoichoi. The second season, titled as Nikhoj 2, was streamed on 10 January 2025 on Hoichoi.

== Reception ==
=== Critical reception ===
Agnivo Niyogi of The Telegraph reviewed the series and wrote "Ayan Chakraborti’s writing builds up the tension with each episode and keeps you guessing, offering a multitude of suspects and motives." He applauded Swastika and Tota's performances in their respective roles, Saoli and Loknath's strong supporting roles, the development of the characters and the depth in the narrative but criticized the slow pace and some weakly written subplots.

Snigdha De of Aajkal reviewed the series and opined "With so many different stories and a multitude of flavors, it is not easy to keep the audience sitting until the very last moment, and to completely throw them off with the surprise of the climax. 'Nikhoj 2' has done that job effortlessly with a tense, lean plot, and strong acting. Director Ayan and his impeccable team have therefore passed with distinction." She praised the actinf of the ensemble cast, particularly Swastika and Tota's roles and the small roes played by Loknath and Rajatava.
