= Baburi Andijani =

Boy mentioned in the memoir of Mughal Emperor Babur

Baburi (Persian: بابری; Uzbek: Boburiy) was a boy in the camp bazaar of Andijan whom Babur describes in his memoir, the Baburnama, as the object of an infatuation in his youth. He is mentioned by name only in this one passage of the memoir, and nothing further is known about him.

== In the Baburnama ==
The episode appears in the entry for 905 AH (1499–1500), immediately after Babur's account of his first marriage, to Ayisha Sultan Begum, in the month of Sha'ban (March 1500). Babur, then seventeen, writes that he found in himself "a strange inclination" for a boy in the camp bazaar "his very name, Baburi, fitting in", and that until then he "had had no inclination for any-one" and knew of love and desire neither by hearsay nor by experience. In the 2008 Uzbek edition of the text the boy is described as the son of the head of the camp bazaar.

Babur writes that he composed Persian couplets about his state and quoted a couplet of Muhammad Salih. He says that Baburi came into his presence from time to time but that, out of modesty and bashfulness, he could never look directly at him, converse with him or thank him for coming. When he met Baburi unexpectedly in a lane he was so confused that he "almost went right off". He describes wandering bareheaded and barefoot through streets, orchards and vineyards, and says that he was indifferent to friends and strangers alike. The passage describes no interaction beyond these encounters.

Modern scholars describe the episode as an infatuation and read the accompanying verses in the context of conventional Persianate love poetry.
