= Rameshwar Banerjee =

Indian revolutionary (1925–1945)

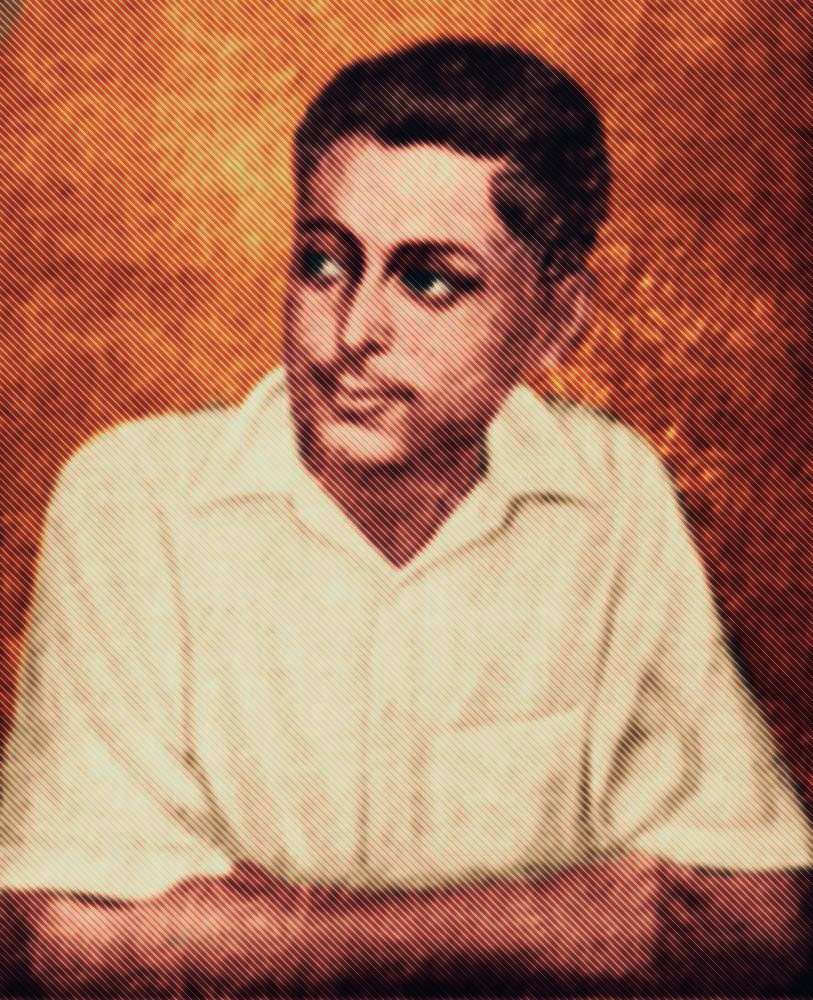
- Born: 8 February 1925; Baghra, Bikrampur, Dhaka, Bengal Presidency, India
- Died: 21 November 1945 (aged 20); Kolkata, Bengal Presidency, India
- Known for: Role in Indian Independence Movement

Rameshwar Banerjee (Bengali: রামেশ্বর বন্দ্যোপাধ্যায়; 8 February 1925 – 21 November 1945) was a revolutionary and martyr of the Indian independence movement. He participated in the Quit India Movement in 1942.

In November 1945, the trial of a number of officers of the Indian National Army began. Throughout India, widespread demonstrations were held. In Kolkata, students led the movement. On 21 November during the rally organized by the students against British rule and for release of the officers of Indian National Army, he was killed by police firing. Abdul Salam was also killed and more than 60 people were injured.

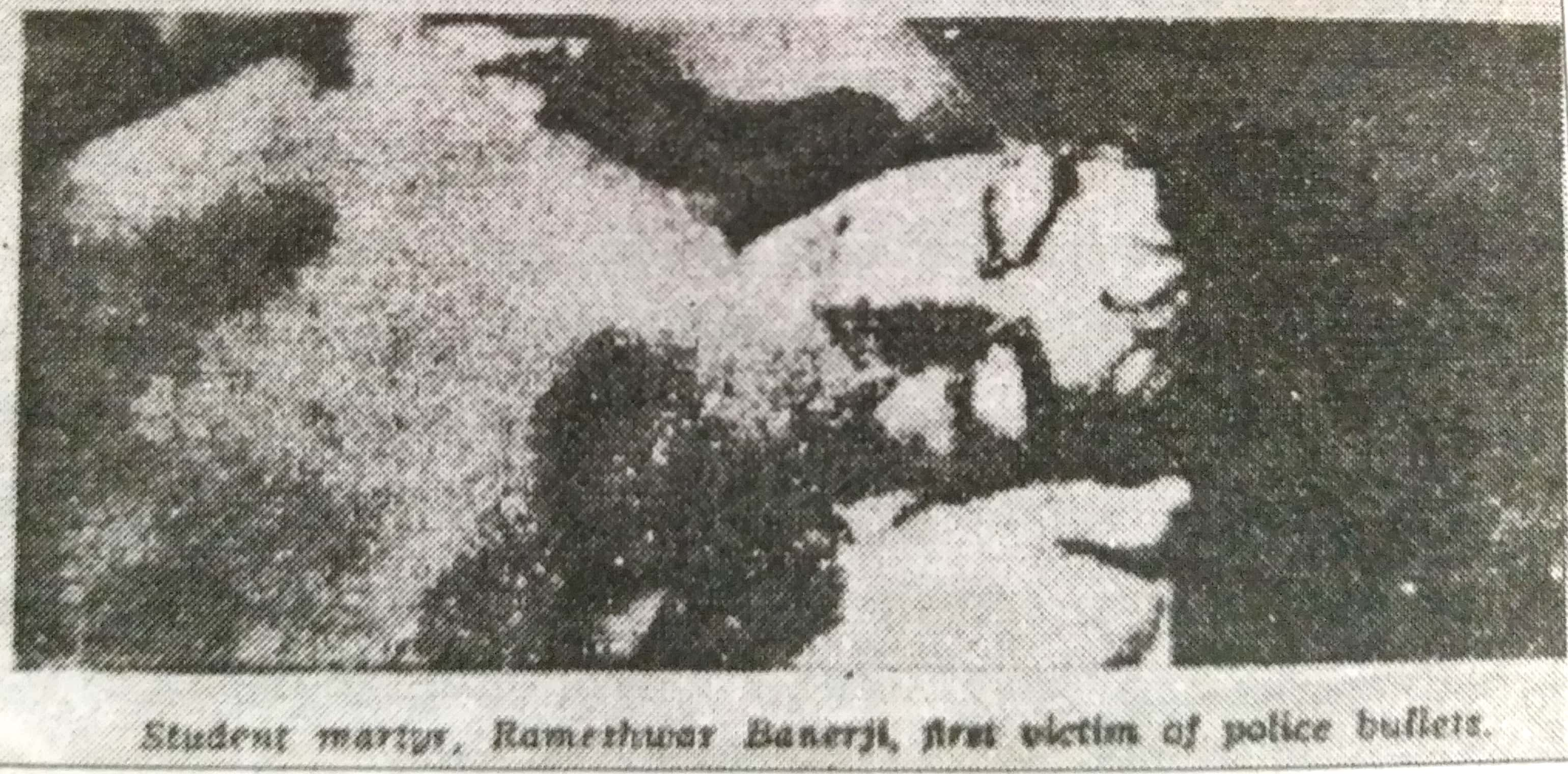
Picture of Rameshwar Banerjee in a local newspaper on 22 November 1945.

After his death, a two-mile-long procession was organized in the streets of Calcutta on 22 November. At least 25,000 students marched, and the whole city was shut down by Hartal. The students marching along gave the anti-colonial slogans of "Dilli chalo (March to Delhi), Lal-Kila tod do (Break down the Red Fort)", and then "Rameshwar Banerjee Zindabad". Although initially they were denied to march through Dalhousie Square (the seat of power of the Bengal Government at that time), they were ultimately successful in parading through there. The colonial government's police had fired on the unarmed youths several times - 13 students were killed and at least 125 were injured. Among the killed was educationist Jyotirmayee Gangopadhyay. From 21 to 23 November, at least 50 protesters were killed and more than 300 were injured from police brutality.

The Bengali poet Nirendranath Chakravarty wrote a poem eulogizing Rameshwar.

== Birth ==
Rameshwar Banerjee was born in Baghra of Dhaka. His father's name is Shailendramohan Bandopadhyay.
