= Kadambini Ganguly =

Indian physician (1861–1923)

Doctor Kadambini Bose
- কাদম্বিনী বসু
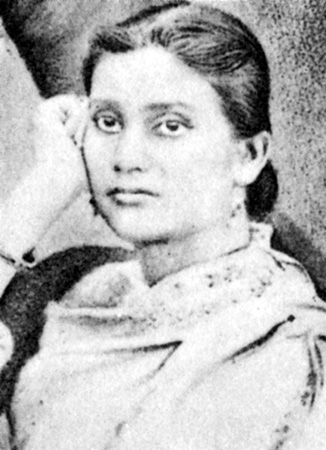
- Born: Kadambini Bose; 18 July 1861; Bhagalpur, Bengal Presidency, British India
- Died: 3 October 1923 (aged 62); Calcutta, Bengal Presidency, British India
- Education: University of Calcutta; Calcutta Medical College
- Occupation: Physician
- Spouse: Dwarkanath Ganguly (m. 1883; died 1898)
- Children: 8

Kadambini Bose Ganguly (18 July 1861 – 3 October 1923) was the first Indian female doctor of western medicine along with Anandibai Joshi. Both got their degree in Western medicine in 1886. However, she was India's first practicing lady doctor, as Anandibai died soon after receiving the degree. She was India's first practicing female doctor in modern medicine. Ganguly was the first woman to gain admission to Calcutta Medical College in 1884, subsequently trained in Scotland, and established a successful medical practice in India. She was the first woman speaker in the Indian National Congress.

== Early life ==
Kadambini was born in a Bengali Kulin Kayastha family as Kadambini Basu who was the daughter of Brahmo reformer Braja Kishore Basu. She was born on 18 July 1861 at Bhagalpur, Bengal Presidency (modern day Bihar) in British India. The family was from Chandshi, in Barisal which is now in Bangladesh. Her father was headmaster of Bhagalpur School. He and Abhay Charan Mallick started the movement for women's emancipation at Bhagalpur, establishing the women's organization Bhagalpur Mahila Samiti in 1863, the first in India.

Despite coming from an upper caste Bengali community that did not support women's education, Kadambini initially received English education at the Brahmo Eden Female School, Dacca; subsequently at Hindu Mahila Vidyalaya, Calcutta which was renamed as Banga Mahila Vidyalaya in 1876. She became the first woman to pass the University of Calcutta entrance examination. In 1882, along with Chandramukhi Basu, she passed the examination of the Bachelor of Arts (BA) degree from the University of Calcutta. She and Chandramukhi became the first female graduates in the country. (Note: Female students were admitted into Oxford University in 1879, one year after the admission of female students for undergraduate studies at the University of Calcutta. The tripos was opened to women at Cambridge only in 1881.)

After graduating, Kadambini Devi decided to study medicine. In 1883, she enrolled at Calcutta Medical College. She was awarded the GBMC (Graduate of Bengal Medical College) degree in 1886. She was the first Indian woman to be allowed to practice Western medicine.

In 1892, Ganguly travelled to Edinburgh to pursue further medical education and was awarded the Scottish Triple Qualification within months of her arrival.

== Politics ==
After studying at a medical college for five years, she worked for a while at Lady Dufferin Hospital in 1888 for a monthly salary of 300 rupees before going to England. In 1895, she went to Nepal for the treatment of the Queen Mother. In 1889, Kadambini was one of the first six women delegates elected to the Fifth Session of the Congress in Bombay. The following year, she spoke at the Sixth Session of the Congress in Calcutta. Kadambini was the first woman speaker at the Congress. Kadambini was the first president of the Transvaal Indian Association, founded by Gandhiji's colleague Henry Pollock, and a member of the Women's Conference held in Calcutta in 1907. In 1914, she presided over the General Brahmo Samaj session in Calcutta. This session was organized in honour of Mahatma Gandhi.

== Personal life ==
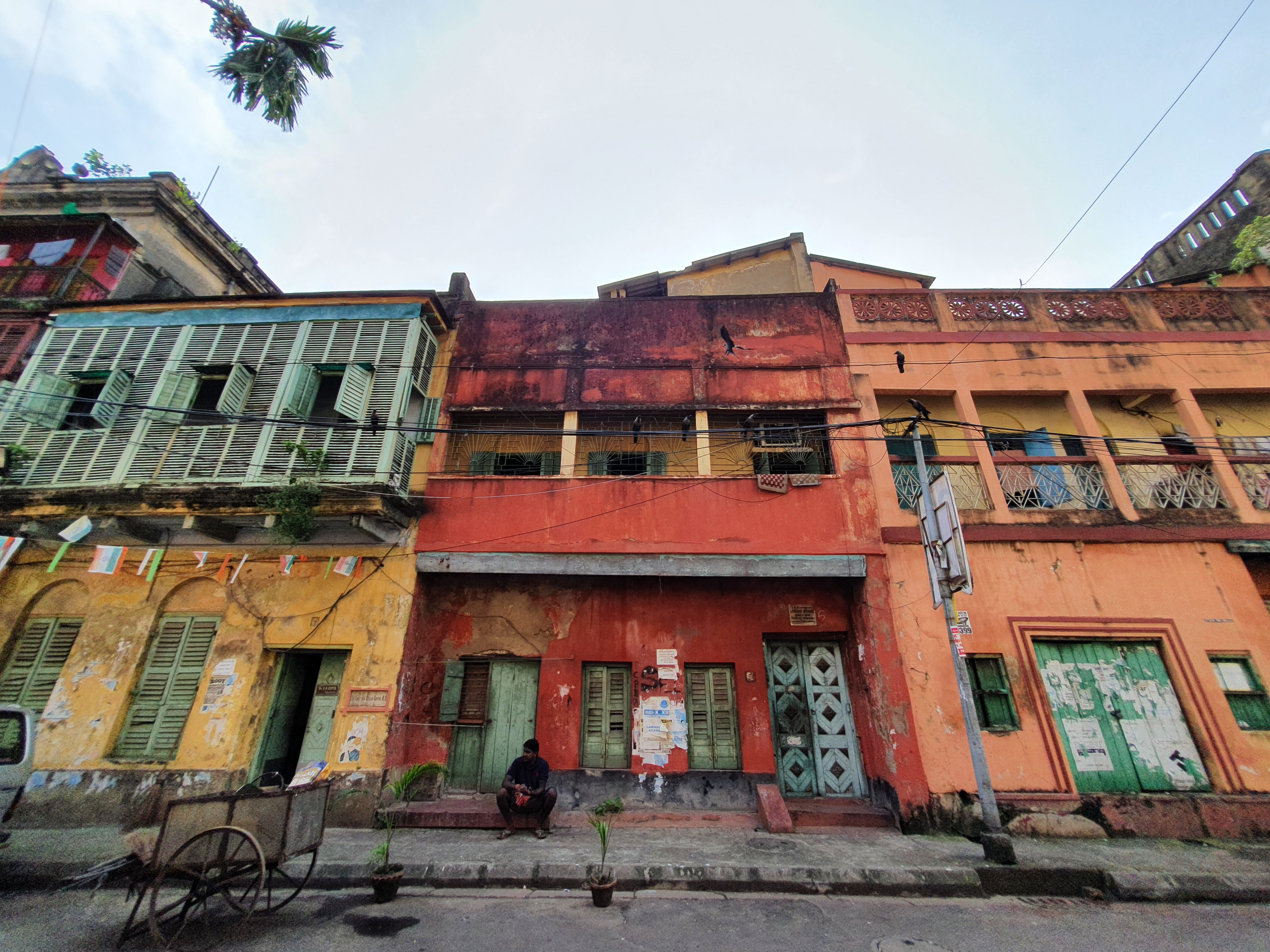
Residence of Kadambini Ganguly

Kadambini Bose married Dwarakanath Ganguly on 12 June 1883, 11 days before joining Calcutta Medical College. As the mother of eight children, she had to devote considerable time to her household affairs. She was deft in needlework. Among her children, Jyotirmayee was a freedom fighter and Prabhat Chandra was a journalist. Her stepdaughter was married to Upendrakishore Ray Chowdhury, grandfather of filmmaker Satyajit Ray.

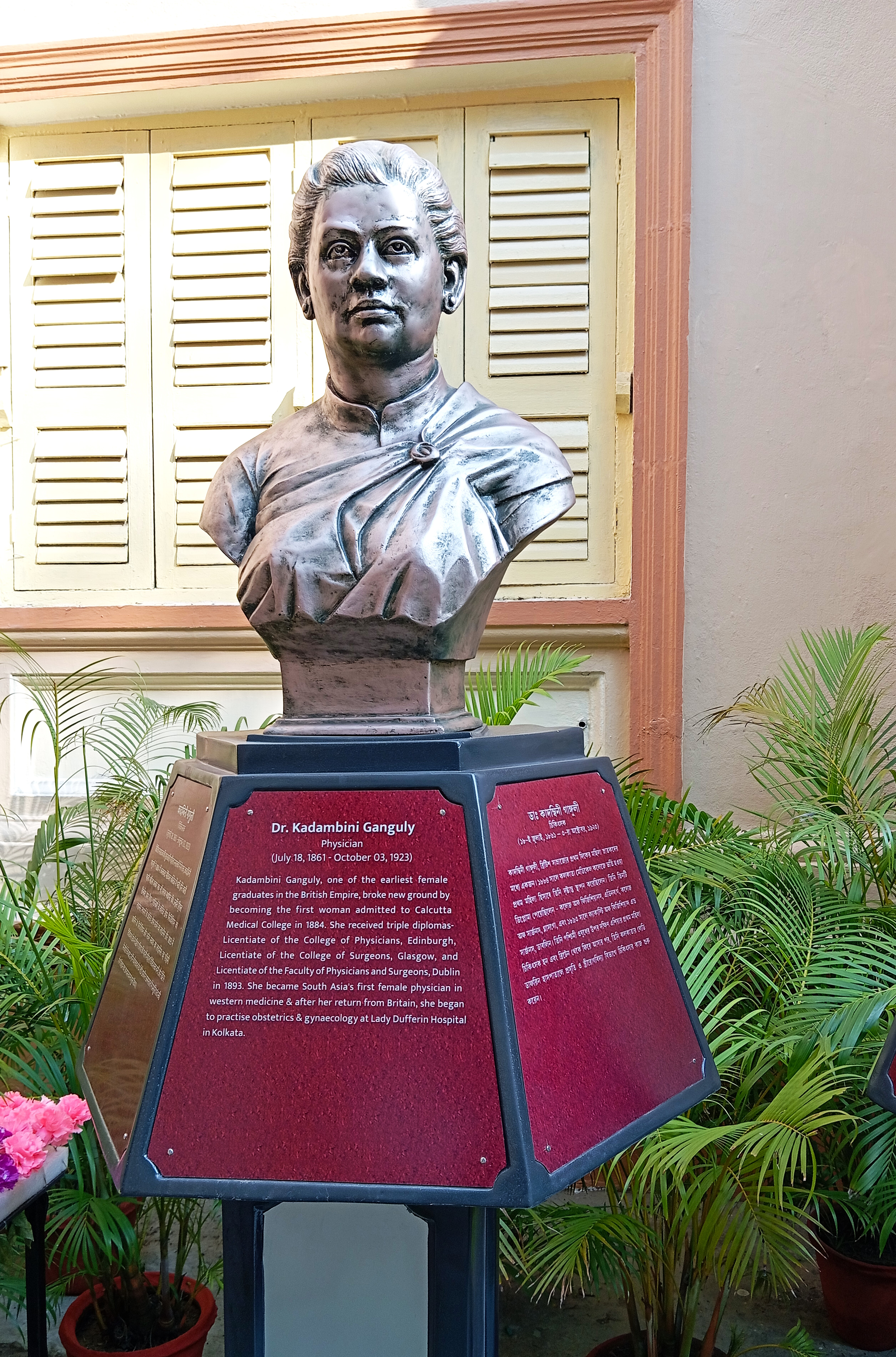
Bust of Kadambini Ganguly, Birla Industrial & Technological Museum, Kolkata, West Bengal, India

American historian David Kopf notes that Ganguly "was appropriately enough the most accomplished and liberated Brahmo woman of her time", and her relationship with her husband Dwarkanath Ganguly "was most unusual in being founded on mutual love, sensitivity and intelligence." Kopf argues that Ganguly was highly unusual even among emancipated women of contemporary Bengali society, and that "her ability to rise above circumstances and to realize her potential as a human being made her a prize attraction to Sadharan Brahmos dedicated ideologically to the liberation of Bengal's women."

Ganguly died on 3 October 1923, after having conducted an operation the same day.

== Criticism from conservative quarters ==
Ganguly was heavily criticized by the conservative society of her time. After returning to India from Edinburgh and campaigning for women's rights, she was indirectly called a 'whore' in the Bengali magazine Bangabashi. Her husband Dwarkanath Ganguly took the case to court and won, with a jail sentence of 6 months meted out to the editor Mahesh Pal.

== In popular culture ==
A Bengali television serial Prothoma Kadambini based on Ganguly's biography was telecast on Star Jalsha beginning in March 2020, starring Solanki Roy and Honey Bafna in the lead. Another Bengali series named Kadambini, starring Ushasi Ray as Ganguly, was telecast on Zee Bangla in 2020.

On 18 July 2021, Google celebrated Ganguly's 160th birth anniversary with a doodle on its homepage in India.

== See Also ==
- Dwarkanath Ganguly
- Anandibai Joshi
- Jamini Sen
- Medical College & Hospital, Kolkata
