= Gramer Rani Binapani =

Indian television series

- Genre: Drama
- Screenplay by: Malova Majumder; Ayan Chakraborty
- Story by: Sushanta Das and Sayantani Bhattacharya
- Directed by: Piyush Ghosh
- Starring: Honey Bafna
- Opening theme: "Gramer Rani Binapani"
- Country of origin: India
- Original language: Bengali
- No. of seasons: 1
- No. of episodes: 375

Production
- Producers: Nispal Singh; Surinder Singh; Sushanta Das
- Camera setup: Multi-camera
- Running time: 22 minutes
- Production companies: Boyhood Productions (Tent Cinema; Surinder Films)

Original release
- Network: Star Jalsha; Hotstar
- Release: 8 March 2021 – 24 June 2022

Gramer Rani Binapani (transl. The Village Queen Binapani) an Indian television series which was telecasted on Star Jalsha and also available on Disney+ Hotstar. The show is produced by Nispal Singh, Surinder Singh and Susanta Das under the banner of Boyhood Productions. It premiered on 8 March 2021. It stars Honey Bafna and Annmary Tom. Later, it also included Moupiya Goswami and Nisha Poddar in the lead roles in the 2nd generation. The show aired its last episode on 24 June 2022.

== Plot ==
Internet star, Binapani, is always ready to help her villagers. Soon, she comes across Shatadru, the owner of a Mill Company and offers her a greater position than himself but, he has another motive. Will love spark? Will hearts flutter and will the two find love?

== Cast ==
=== Main ===
- Honey Bafna as Shatadru Roy Chowdhury aka Bittu – a businessman, owner of Maheswar Mills, a food producing company, Binapani's husband, Sahana's father, Ridhima's foster father (2021 – 2022)
- Annmary Tom as Binapani Roy Chowdhury (née Halder) – an internet star, Shatadru's wife, Sahana's mother, Ridhima's foster mother (2021 – 2022)
- Moupiya Goswami as Ridhima Roy Chowdhury – Shambhu's daughter, Shatadru and Binapani's adopted daughter (2022)
- Nisha Poddar as Sahana Roy Chowdhury – Shatadru and Binapani's daughter, Ridhima's step sister and rival (2022)

=== Recurring ===
- Maitryree Mitra as Chandrima Ghosh (née Roychowdhury) – Shatadru's paternal aunt, Chintu's mother, Olivia and Binapani's rival (2021 – 2022)
- Arindam Banerjee as Shatadru's uncle (2021 – 2022)
- Sritama Bhattacharjee as Ajopa Ghosh – Chintu's wife (2021 – 2022)
- Ayaan Ghosh as Sharanya Roy Chowdhury aka Guddu – Shatadru's youngest brother, Bina's friend and an immature brat, Olivia's ex-husband and Shawon's father (2021 – 2022)
- Rajiv Bose as Saibal Ghosh aka Chintu – Chandrima's son; Shatadru's younger cousin brother and a conspirator (2021 – 2022)
- Elfina Mukherjee as Shatarupa (2021 – 2022)
- Sourav Banerjee as Rintu – Shatadru's younger brother (2021 – 2022)
- Sudipta Banerjee as Sanjukta Dutta This is to report a fault as this character introduces herself as Sanjukta Maitra rather than Sanjukta Dutta– a doctor, Shatadru's ex-girlfriend (2021)
- Ranjini Chatterjee as Binapani's mother, a panchayat pradhan (2021 –2022)
- Payel Dutta as Priya – Binapani's elder sister (2021)
- Avrajit Chakkraborty as Chanchal Senapati – Priya's husband (2021)
- Swarnadipto Ghosh as Pulak Senapati – Chanchal's younger brother, Bina's friend turned enemy (2021 –2022)
- Koushiki Guha as Ishani Roy Chowdhury – Shatadru's mother (2021 – 2022)
- Surojit Banerjee as Maheswar Roy Chowdhury – Shatadru's late father (Deceased) (2021)
- Ananya Guha as Mitun – Shatadru's eldest cousin (2021)
- Debapriya Basu as Tutun – Shatadru's youngest cousin (2021)
- Anirban Ghosh as Milan Babu – Manager at Maheshwar Mills and Shatadru's trusted companion (2021 – 2022)
- Ayendri Lavnia Roy as Olivia – Guddu's wife (divorced), Shawon's mother. She is a fraud who cheated the Roy Chowdhury 's (Deceased) (2021 – 2022)
- Ayush Das as Young Shatadru (flashback) (2021)
- Jayati Chakraborty as Shambhu's wife and Ridhima's mother who died due to blood donation during Binapani's delivery (2022) (Deceased)
- Kaushik Das as Gaurav – Ridhima's husband (2022)
- Mainak Dhol as Shawon – Sharanya and Olivia's son (2022)
- Poushmita Goswami as Elina (2022)
- Madhupriya Chowdhury as fake Binapani (2021 – 2022)
