= Krishna Govinda Gupta =

British Indian civil servant (1851–1926)

Sir Krishna Govinda Gupta KCSI
- স্যার কৃষ্ণগোবিন্দ গুপ্ত
- Born: 28 February 1851; Bhatpara, Narsingdi, British India
- Died: 20 March 1926 (aged 75); Calcutta, British India
- Occupation: Civil servant

Signature
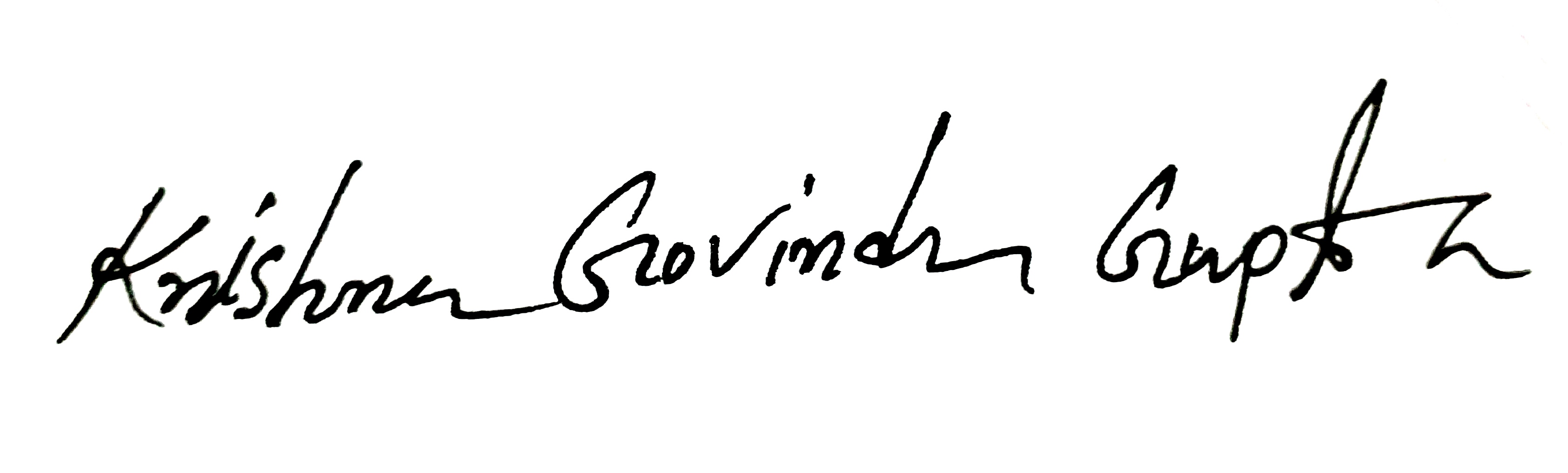

Sir Krishna Govinda Gupta KCSI (Bengali: স্যার কৃষ্ণগোবিন্দ গুপ্ত; 28 February 1851 – 20 March 1926) was a British Indian civil servant, the sixth Indian member of the Indian Civil Service, a barrister-at-law, a prominent Bengali social reformer of the 19th century and leading Brahmo Samaj personality.

== Early life and education ==
Krishna Govinda Gupta was born in a Bengali Baidya family in Bhatpara village, Sadar Police Station, Narsingdi district, near Dhaka, now located in Bangladesh. His father was Kali Narayan Gupta, a landlord of Bhatpara, and an eminent person in Brahma society. His mother was Annada Sundari Gupta, a daughter of Madhab Chandra Sen. His early education was carried out at Mymensingh Government School and Dacca College. Later, he joined the University College, London, where he successfully took the Open Competitive Examination standing second in the final examination. He became the seventh Indian member of the Indian Civil Service, joining the service as a probationer in 1871 coming out to India in 1873. He was also called to the Bar by The Honourable Society of the Middle Temple. His brothers were Peary Mohan Gupta, Ganga Gobinda Gupta and Benoy Chandra Gupta. His sisters were Subala Gupta, Bimala Das, Hemanta Shashi Sen, Soudamini Das, Chapala Dutta, Sarala Das.

He was married to Prasanna Tara Gupta, who was a daughter of Nabin Chandra Das.

Painter Anjolie Ela Menon is a great grand daughter through Birendra Chandra Gupta.

== Career ==
In the British occupied India appointment to all covenanted posts were reserved for the Britishers only. The posts of Munsif and Sadar Amin were created and opened to Indians in 1832. In 1833, the posts of deputy magistrate and deputy collector were created and opened to Indians. The ICS Act of 1861 established the Indian Civil Service. The Act of 1853 had already established the practice of recruiting covenanted civilians through competitive examinations. Krishna Govinda Gupta appeared in the Indian Civil Service examination in 1871 in London and became a probationer. He joined Civil Service on 24 October 1873 as Assistant Magistrate and Collector, being the sixth Indian to join ICS up to that time.

Successively he served in the special duty of controlling famine in Bengal and Bihar during 1873-74; became joint magistrate and deputy collector in 1884; appointed as Secretary, Board of Revenue in 1887; became magistrate and collector in 1889; appointed as the junior secretary to the Board of Revenue in 1890; became the commissioner of excise in March 1893; and acted as the divisional commissioner of Burdwan in 1901. He was the first Indian to be appointed as Member, Board of Revenue in 1904. He then became a member of the Indian Excise Committee in 1905 and was on special duty in connection with the Fisheries of Bengal in 1906.

It was a report submitted by Krishna Govinda in 1906, on the potential of fisheries in Bengal, while he was a member of the Excise Committee, that paved the way of creation of the Department of Fisheries in the Government of Bengal in 1908. Encouragement in cultivation of inland fisheries, prawn and other water based farming etc. were a government prerogative since that time. The legacy is still continuing for the fish loving Bengalis in both India and Bangladesh.

On 25 July 1907, Krishna Govinda Gupta along with Dr. Syed Hussain Bilgrami became the first Indian to be nominated as member of the Secretary of State's Council of India. Later he was also appointed as a member of Lord Esher's Army in India Committee in 1920.

List of Indian ICS offices (1861-1899)

Sl No	Name	Year of Examination	Year of Joining
1	Satyendranath Tagore	1863	1864
2	Romesh Dutt	1869	1871
3	Behari Lal Gupta	1869	1871
4	Surendranath Banerjee	1869	1871
5	Ananda Ram Baruah	1870	1872
6	Krishna Govinda Gupta	1871	1873
8	Brajendranath De	1873	1875
9	Cursetjee Rustomjee	1874	1876
10	Perungavur Rajagopalachari	1886	1888
11	Basanta Kumar Mullick	1887	1889
12	Albion Rajkumar Banerjee	1894	1895
13	Atul Chandra Chatterjee	1896	1897

== Socio-literary activities ==
Satyendranath Tagore (1842–1923), an ICS of 1863, was a close associate of Krishna Govinda in his socio literary activities. Taraknath Palit, Monomohun Ghose, Satyendra Prasanna Sinha, Bihari Lal Gupta and Krishna Govinda Gupta were some of the regular participants among the eminent stalwarts of the then Bengal in the majlis (discussions) arranged from time to time in Satyendranath's house in Park Street and Ballygunge.

== Legacy ==
A school called 'Pachdona Sir K. G. Gupta High School' has been established in Pachdona, Narsingdi district (then subdivision) on 1 January 1919.

=== Awards ===
– Knight Commander of the Order of the Indian Empire
