= Henry Beveridge (orientalist) =

British-Indian Civil Service officer (1837–1929)

- Born: 9 February 1837; Scotland
- Died: 8 November 1929 (aged 92); London, England
- Occupation: Orientalists
- Spouse: Annette Akroyd
- Children: William Beveridge
- Father: Henry Beveridge (1799–1863)

Henry Beveridge (9 February 1837 – 8 November 1929) was an Indian Civil Service officer and orientalist in India.

== Life and career ==
Born in Inzievar, Fife, Scotland, Beveridge studied at the Royal Circus School, Fife, Edinburgh Academy and the University of Glasgow. In 1856 he entered Queen's College, Belfast, where his father had been appointed editor of The Banner of Ulster. In July 1857 he successfully passed the public examinations for the Indian Civil Service, joining the service in 1857. He left for India in 1857 and reached Calcutta in January 1858.

After training he was posted to Mymensingh as Assistant Magistrate and Collector and was then transferred to Jhenaidah in 1861, to Jessore in January 1862, to Nadia in April 1862, to Midnapur in January 1863, and to Sylhet in February 1863. From November 1863 he was posted for one year to the Foreign Department, serving in Manipur on special duty, after which he was sent to Kuch Behar as Joint Magistrate and Deputy Collector and then successively transferred to Dhaka, Noakhali, Hughli, Barisal, Chittagong and back to Barisal in June 1871.

In 1875 he entered the judiciary and was posted to Rangpur as District and Sessions Judge in December 1876. He served in the same capacity in the districts of Pabna, 24 Parganas, Faridpur, Birbhum, Hughli, and Murshidabad until his retirement in 1893. He was elected President of The Asiatic Society (of Bengal) for 1890–91.

== Private life ==
He married Annette Akroyd, one of the first graduates of Bedford College and translator of Persian and Turki (Chagatai) texts. Her known works are the translations of the Baburnama from the Turki language, and the Humayun-nama from Persian. The couple had two children: a daughter, Annette Jeanie Beveridge (d. 1956), who married R. H. Tawney, the acclaimed economic historian, and a son, William Beveridge (1879–1963), a noted economist who gave his name to the report associated with the foundation of the welfare state.

Beveridge retired to Pitfold, Shottermill, Surrey, England, where he devoted his time to studying and writing about India before dying in 1929.

Beveridge was an atheist and "an ardent discipline of the French positivist philosopher Auguste Comte" and his theories of altruism and the religion of humanity.

== Works ==
- Beveridge, Henry (1876). The District of Bákarganj: Its History and Statistics. London: Trübner & Co.
- —— (1886). The Trial of Maharaja Nanda Kumar: A Narrative of a Judicial Murder. Calcutta: Thacker, Spink and Co.

Translations

- The Tūzuk-i-Jahangīrī Or Memoirs of Jahāngīr, Alexander Rogers and Henry Beveridge. London, Royal Asiatic Society, 1909–1914.
- The Akbarnama of Abu-L-Fazl, Vol. I & II, Delhi: Low Price Publications, (1902–39, Reprint 2010). ISBN 81-7536-482-3.
- The Akbarnama of Abu-L-Fazl, Vol. III, Delhi: Low Price Publications, (1902–39, Reprint 2010). ISBN 81-7536-483-1.
- The Akbarnama of Abu-L-Fazl, Set of 3 Volumes, Bound in 2, Delhi: Low Price Publications, (1902–39, Reprint 2010). ISBN 81-7536-481-5.

== See also ==
- Akbarnama
