= Anjolie Ela Menon =

Indian artist

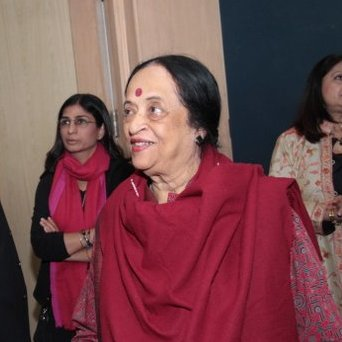
- Born: 17 July 1940 (age 86); Burnpur, Bengal Presidency
- Education: Miranda College University of Delhi; École des Beaux-Arts; The Lawrence School; Sir J.J. Institute of Applied Art
- Known for: Painting
- Notable work: Yatra, Looking Out of a Window, Acolyte, Portrait of a Young Actor, The Magician Story
- Awards: Padma Shri (2000); Kalidas Samman for Visual Arts (2018)

Anjolie Ela Menon (born 17 July 1940) is one of India's leading contemporary artists. Her paintings are in several major collections, including the NGMA, the Chandigarh Museum and the Peabody Essex Museum. In 2006, her triptych work "Yatra" was acquired by the Asian Art Museum of San Francisco, California. Other works have also been a part of group exhibitions including 'Kalpana: Figurative Art in India', presented by the Indian Council for Cultural Relations (ICCR) in London's Aicon Gallery in 2009. Her preferred medium is oil on masonite, though she has also worked in other media, including Murano glass, computer graphics and water colour. She is a well known muralist. She was awarded the Padma Shree in 2000. She lives and works in New Delhi.

== Early life ==
Anjolie Ela Menon was born on 17 July 1940, in Burnpur, Bengal [now in West Bengal], India and is of mixed Bengali and American parentage. Her ancestors include Krishna Govinda Gupta and Sovabazar Raj family.

She went to Lawrence School, Lovedale in the Nilgiri Hills, Tamil Nadu. By the age of 15, when she left school, she had already sold a few paintings. Thereafter, she briefly studied at the Sir J.J. Institute of Applied Art, Mumbai and later earned a degree in English literature from Delhi University, where she studied at the women's college, Miranda House. During this time, she was drawn to the works of Modigliani, and Indian painters, M F Husain and Amrita Shergil. At 18, she held a solo exhibition with fifty-three paintings of a variety of styles. She obtained a French Government scholarship to study at the École des Beaux-Arts in Paris from 1959 to 1961 and she travelled extensively in Europe and West Asia studying Romanesque and Byzantine art. During 1980-81, the governments of France, U.K. and US invited her to pursue further studies.

== Work ==
Anjolie Ela Menon's preferred medium was oil on masonite, which she applied by using a series of translucent colours and thin washes. In addition to oil paintings and murals, she worked in several other mediums, including computer graphics and Murano glass. She is best known for her religious-themed works, portraits, and nudes that incorporated a vibrant colour palette and were rendered in a variety of styles ranging from cubism to techniques that recalled the artists of the European Renaissance. In 1997 she, for the first time displayed non-figurative work, including Buddhist abstracts. She represented India at the Paris, Algiers, and São Paulo Biennales and at three Triennales in New Delhi.

Being a well-known muralist, Anjolie Ela Menon has done over 35 solo shows and many group shows in India and abroad. In 1968, 1972 and 1975, she performed along with I, II, III International Triennale by Lalit Kala Akademi, with Paris Biennale, France in 1980 and in 1980 at New York and Washington D.C.

In the year 2000, Government of India conferred Anjolie Ela Menon with the most prestigious Padma Shree Award. In the same year, she was nominated to be on the board of trustees of the Indira Gandhi National Centre for the Arts (IGNCA) — the only visual artist to have ever been nominated. In 2002, her work 'Four Decades' was shown in a major exhibition organised by the Vadehra Art Gallery in the National Gallery of Modern Art, Mumbai. The collection eventually toured other prominent galleries in major Indian cities, including the Karnataka Chitrakala Parishath, Bangalore. Her life and work has been featured in several publications and films made for CNN and Doordarshan Channels.

== Later life ==
Anjolie married her childhood love, Rear Admiral (Retd.) Raja Menon, an Indian Navy officer turned strategic analyst and writer. She has two sons and four grandchildren. Since her marriage, she has lived and worked in India, the US, Europe, Japan and the erstwhile USSR. She collects works of other artists including Arpita Singh, Rini Dumal, F.N. Souza, Jamini Roy, Ram Kumar, and K.G. Subramanyam.

== Awards ==
- 2000: The Padma Shri, the fourth highest civilian award in India
- 2010: Felicitation from the Limca Book of Records
- 2013: Lifetime Achievement Award from the Delhi State Government conferred by then Chief Minister Sheila Dikshit
- 2018: Kalidas Samman for Visual Arts from the Madhya Pradesh government

== Shows ==
Anjolie Ela Menon has had over thirty solo shows including at Black heath Gallery-London, Gallery Radicke-Bonn, Winston Gallery-Washington, Doma Khudozhinkov-USSR, Rabindra Bhavanand Shridharani Gallery-New Delhi, Academy of Fine Arts-Calcutta, the Gallery-Madras, Jehangir Gallery, Chemould Gallery, Taj Gallery, Bombay and Maya Gallery at the Museum Annexe, Hong Kong. A retrospective exhibition was held in 1988 in Bombay and she has participated in several international shows in France, Japan, Russia and USA. In addition to paintings in private and corporate collections, her works have been acquired by museums in India and abroad.

== Publications ==
- Anjolie Ela Menon: Paintings in Private Collections Hardcover – 15 November 1995 by Isana Murti (Author), Indira Dayal (Compiler), Anjolie Ela Menon (Illustrator)
- "Anjolie Ela Menon: Through the Patina,” by Isana Murty, published by Vadhera Art Gallery
