= Monomohun Ghose =

Indian politician and Barrister

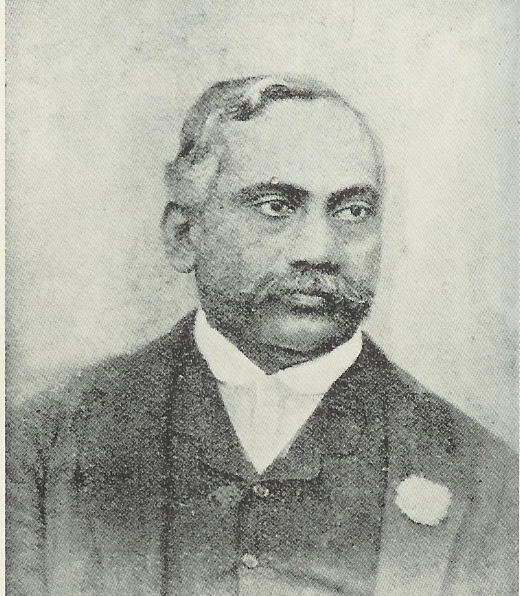
- Born: 13 March 1844; Bikrampur, Bengal Presidency, British India
- Died: 16 October 1896 (aged 52); Krishnanagar, Bengal Presidency, British India
- Education: Presidency University, Kolkata
- Occupations: Barrister, social reformer, activist
- Known for: Co-founder of Indian National Congress
- Political party: Indian National Congress
- Spouse: Swarnalata Devi
- Relatives: Lalmohan Ghosh (brother)

Manmohun Ghose (Mônmohon Ghosh) (also spelt Monomohun Ghosh, Manmohan Ghosh) (13 March 1844 – 16 October 1896) was the first practicing barrister of Indian origin. He is notable for his contributions towards the fields of women's education, for arousing the patriotic feeling of his countrymen and for being one of the earliest persons in the country in organised national politics. At the same time his Anglicised habits often made him a target of ridicule in Calcutta. He was one of the co-founders of Indian National Congress.

== Formative years ==
He was the son of Ramlochan Ghose, of Bikrampur (now Munshiganj in Bangladesh). His father was a renowned sub-judge and a patriot, and had acquired his broad frame of mind from Ram Mohan Roy, when he came in contact with him.

As a child Ghose lived with his father in Krishnanagar and passed the Entrance Examination (school leaving or university entrance) in 1859 from Krishnagar Government College. In 1858, he was married to Swarnalata, daughter of Shyma Charan Roy of Taki-Sripur in 24 Parganas.

While he was still at school, the indigo movement was raging. He wrote an article against indigo merchants and sent it for publication in the Hindu Patriot but the same could not be published owing to the untimely death of its editor, Harish Chandra Mukherjee. He joined Presidency College in 1861 and while a student there, he developed a friendship with Keshub Chunder Sen. Together they started the Indian Mirror.

In 1862, he and Satyendranath Tagore were the first two Indians to sail to England to prepare for and appear in the Indian Civil Service examinations. The competition was one of the stiffest, if not the stiffest, in the world at that time, the more so because crossing the seas to Europe was bound to meet with the strongest opposition from Indian society. Preparations for the examination was tough, as they had to pick up many subjects not taught in India. Moreover, Ghose was subject to racial discrimination. The examination schedules and syllabus were altered. He sat for the examinations twice but failed to succeed. Satyendranath Tagore went through and became the first Indian to join the ICS.

While in England, he extended support to the fellow Kolkata poet Michael Madhusudan Dutta who was going through difficult times in England.

== Barrister and Anglicised Indian ==
Monomohun Ghose was called to the bar from Lincoln's Inn. After being called to the English bar, Ghose returned to India in 1866. At that time his father died and he started practising as a barrister in Calcutta High Court in 1867.

He was the first Indian barrister to practice in Calcutta High Court. Gnanendramohan Tagore was the first Indian to have been called to the bar in England in 1862 and Monomohun Ghose is disputed to be the second Indian to be called in 1866.

Gnanendramohan Tagore never practised in Calcutta High Court before departing permanently for England, and as such Ghose is considered the first practising Indian barrister.

His talents were immediately recognised and within a short period he made his mark as a criminal lawyer. In numerous cases he exposed the character of the British ruling elite and protected the subjects who were not guilty.

On return from England, one of the first things he did was to put his wife in charge of the nuns at Loreto Convent, for her education. It was only after his wife had completed her education that he settled down to family life.

While in England, Ghose yearned for the Bengali staple food, machher jhal and bhat (fish curry and rice), but back home he took on all the characteristics of an Anglicised Indian in defiance of opposition from the family and society. In later years, whenever the local press sought to criticize the denationalised Indian, Ghose invariably became the primary target of ridicule. In spite of the fact that he was close to the Tagore family, who were leaders in upholding Indian culture and heritage while keeping their doors open to the world, and was a personal friend of Satyendranath Tagore, he was inclined towards westernisation. While Satyendranth Tagore's wife, Gyanadanandini Devi, struck to wearing the traditional Indian sari, Ghose's wife, Swarnalata, took to wearing the gown, in the style of English women.

== Contribution in the field of women's education ==
Ghose will long be remembered for his contributions towards the improvement of the position of his countrymen, particularly in the field of women's education, apart from donating his house for the building of Krishnagar Collegiate School.

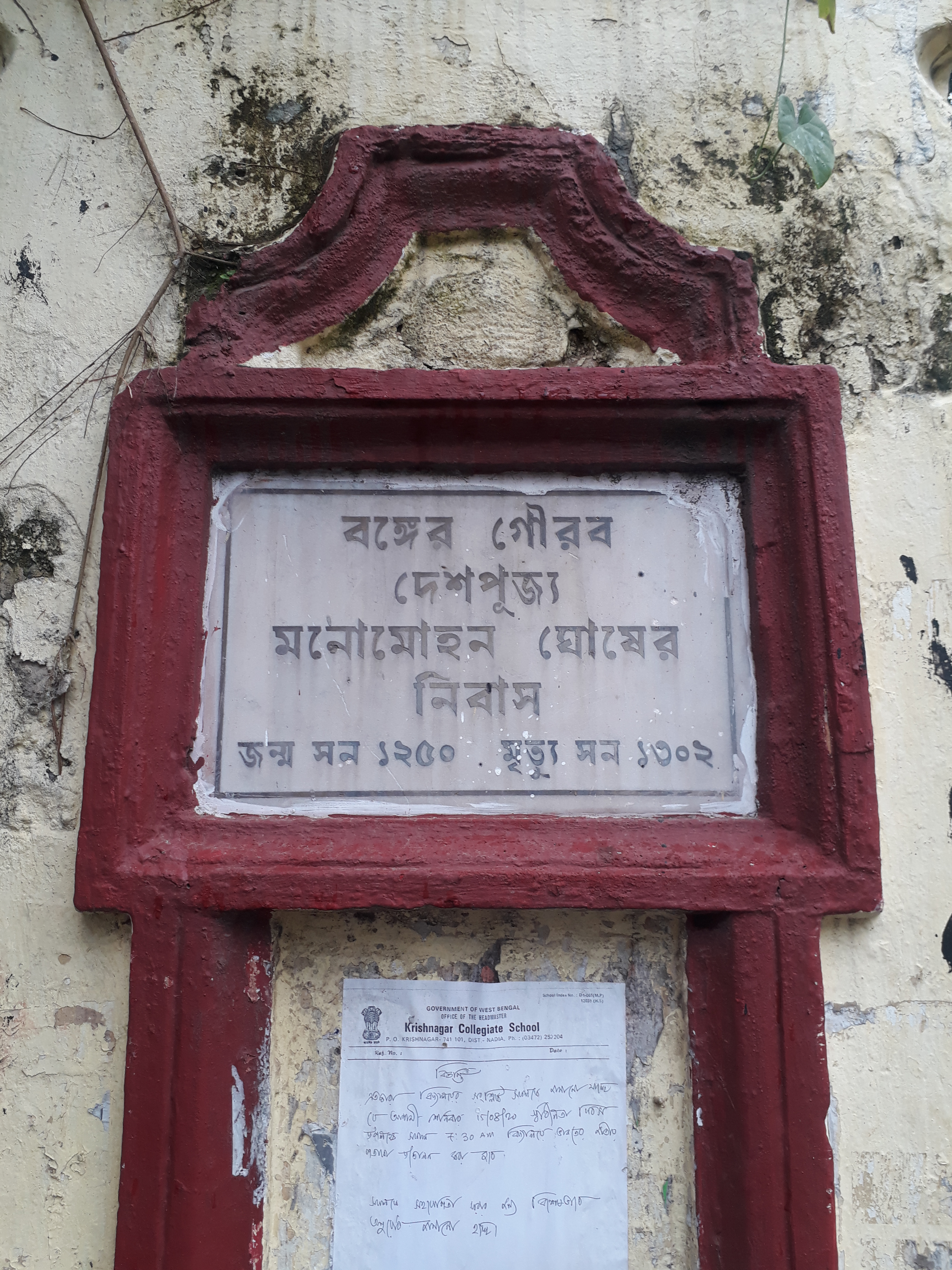
House of Ghosh, presently Krishnagar Collegiate School

He had befriended the Unitarian reformer, Mary Carpenter, during his stay in England, 1862–1866. When she visited Kolkata in 1869 with a definite scheme for promoting women's education, Ghose was among her most ardent supporters. He succeeded in setting up a normal school for training teachers under the Indian Reform Association led by Keshub Chunder Sen.

During his stay in England he had befriended another Unitarian, Annette Akroyd. On arrival at Kolkata with the objective of promoting women's education, in October 1872, she was a house guest of Ghose and his wife. While Swarnalata, Ghose's wife, impressed Annette Akroyd, she was "shocked" when she met Keshub Chunder Sen's "unemancipated Hindu wife."

He was associated with Hindu Mahila Vidyalaya and after Annette Akroyd was married, with the revival of the school as Banga Mahila Vidyalaya. Finally, he played a leading role in the amalgamation of Banga Mahila Vidyalaya with Bethune School. By the time Monomohun Ghose died the institution had already turned, under his secretaryship, into a centre of higher studies where girls could read up to the postgraduate level.

== Politics ==
When the Indian Association was established in 1876 he was one of the advisers. Numerous meetings with Surendranath Banerjee, Ananda Mohan Bose and others attending were held in his house. He was one of the founders of the Indian National Congress established in 1885 and was chairman of the reception committee of its session held at Kolkata in 1890. He fought hard for separation of the judiciary from the administration and wrote the book Administration of Justice in India. He fought the practice of child marriage and supported an 1891 bill requiring consent in marriage.

Right from 1869, he delivered speeches at various places arousing the patriotic feelings of his countrymen. In 1885, he went to England and lectured at various places enlightening people there about the state of affairs in his home country.

Satyendranath Tagore's house on Park Street (after his retirement) was a meeting place for important people of the age in Kolkata. Ghose joined Taraknath Palit, Satyendra Prasanno Sinha, Umesh Bannerjee, Krishna Govinda Gupta, and Behari Lal Gupta, as a regular visitor.
