= Annette Beveridge =

British orientalist (1842–1929)

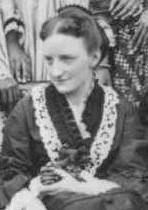
- Born: Annette Susannah Akroyd; 13 December 1842; Mount Street, Stourbridge, Worcestershire, England
- Died: 29 March 1929 (aged 86); 26 Porchester Square, Bayswater, London, England

Annette Susannah Beveridge (née Akroyd) (13 December 1842 – 29 March 1929) was a British Orientalist known for her translation of the Humayun-nama and the Babur-nama.

== Background and education ==
Annette Akroyd's father William Akroyd was a Unitarian industrialist associated with the establishment of the Bedford College, London in 1849, where she completed her study in 1863.

== Works in India ==
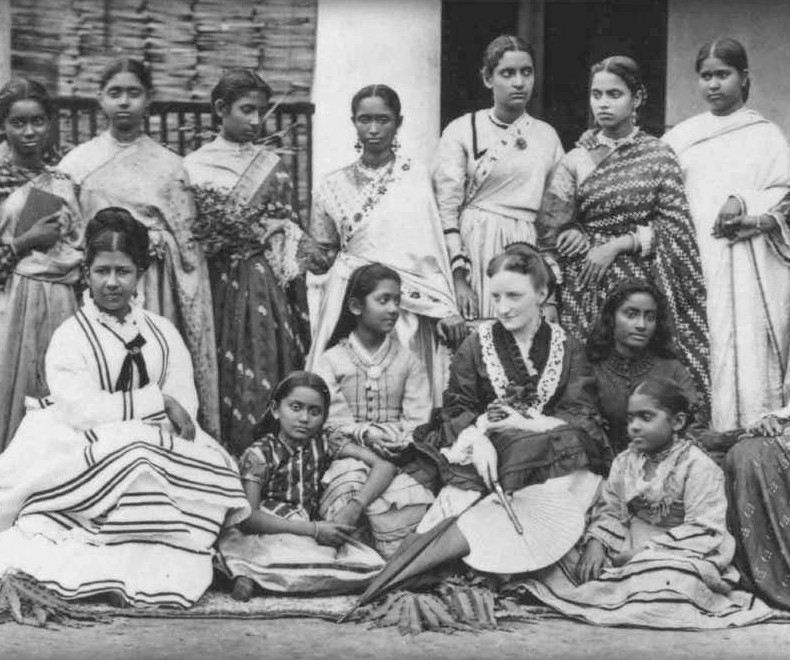
Annette Akroyd with the students of Hindu Mahila Vidyalaya, 1875

In October 1872, she sailed for British India. Around 1875, she was involved in a public controversy with Keshub Chandra Sen, an Indian philosopher and social reformer who attempted to incorporate Christian theology within the framework of Hindu thought. Akroyd was shocked by her discussions with him and felt that Sen, who spoke up for women's education in England, was a typical Hindu obscurantist back home in India, trying to keep knowledge from the minds of women. This dispute spilled into the native press and had its impact on the Bethune School. Akroyd was also dismayed with Sen's associates such as Bijoy Krishna Goswami, Aghore Nath Gupta and Gour Govinda Ray, who were traditionally Hindu in educational background and resisted the education of women. Keshub Sen marrying off his own daughter at very young age also exposed his empty polemic against child marriage.

"Mr. Sen had a strong prejudice against university education, in fact, against what is generally regarded as high education, of women. He objected to teaching them, for instance, such subjects as Mathematics, Philosophy and Science, whereas the advanced party positively wanted to give their daughters and sisters what is generally regarded as high education. They did not object to their university education and were not disposed to make much difference in point of education between men and women. There was no hope of compromise between two such extreme schools of thought, Accordingly, the radical party proceeded to start a separate female school of their own, called the Hindu Mahila Vidyalaya for the education of the adult young ladies belonging to their party. The successful manner in which they carried on the work of this school under Miss Akroyd, subsequently Mrs. Beveridge, attracted much public notice and was highly praised by the officers of Government. This school did excellent work for many years and was subsequently conducted under the name of the Banga Mahila Vidyalaya and was at last amalgamated with the Bethune College for ladies, to which it furnished some of its most distinguished students."

== Translation ==
Annette Beveridge translated the diaries of the first Mughal Emperor Babur, the Baburnama, publishing it in four books from 1912 to 1922. She used both Persian and Turki sources.

She also translated the biography of the second Mughal Emperor, Humayun, from Persian into English. The memoir had been written by his sister Gulbadan Begum, whom Beveridge affectionately called "Princess Rosebody". Her other translated works include The key of the hearts of beginners, 1908.

== Marriage and children ==
She married Henry Beveridge of the Indian Civil Service.

The couple had two children: a daughter, Annette Jeanie Beveridge (d. 1956), who went up to Somerville College, Oxford in 1899 and married R. H. Tawney, and a son, William Beveridge (1879–1963), a noted economist who gave his name to the report associated with the foundation of the welfare state.
