= David Kopf =

American historian

David Kopf is professor emeritus at the University of Minnesota. A research scholar on South Asian history, he has produced several books on the region. He has won the Guggenheim Fellowship at the university.
