= Prasanna Kumar Roy =

Educationist (born 1849)

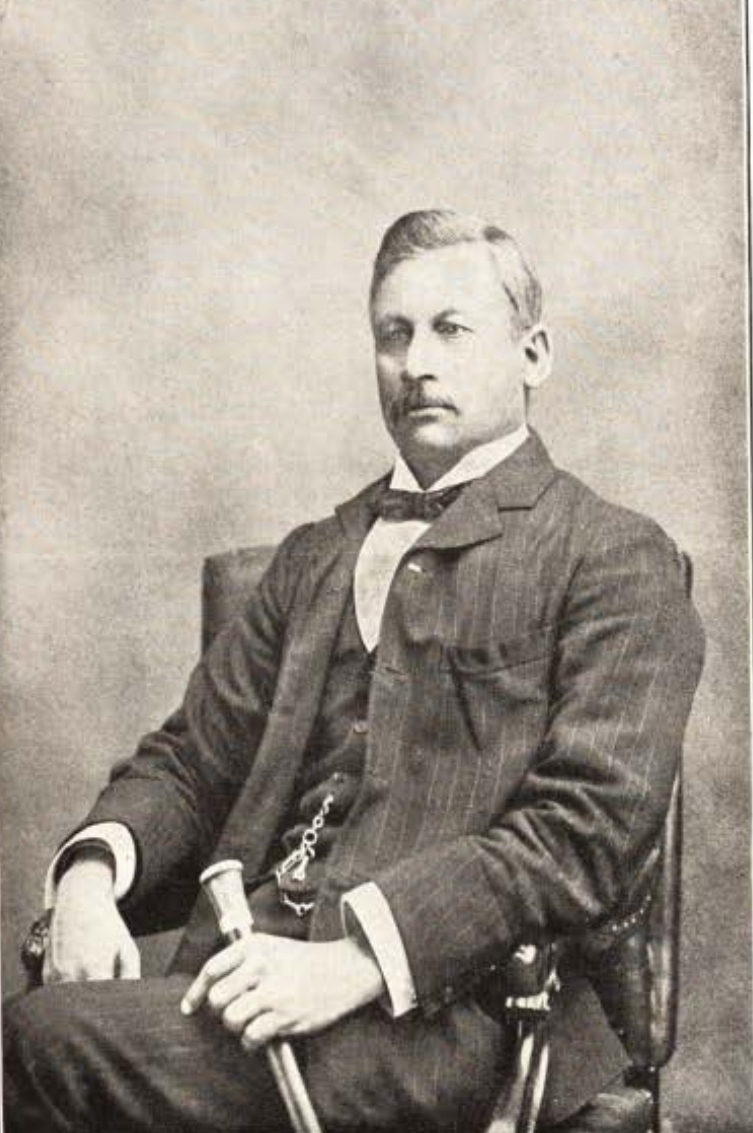
- Born: 1849; Subhadya, Bengal, British India
- Died: 1932 (aged 82–83)
- Education: University of London; University of Edinburgh
- Occupation: Academic
- Spouse: Sarala Roy
- Children: Charulata Mukherjee

Prasanna Kumar Roy (1849 – 1932; better known as Dr. P. K. Roy) was an educationist and the first Indian principal of Presidency College, Kolkata.

== Early life ==
Roy was born in 1849 in Subhadya (now in Keraniganj Upazila of Dhaka District, Bangladesh). He was a student of Pogose School in Dhaka. In his youth, he was attracted to the Brahmo Samaj. This came between him and his father, who turned him out of his house. In 1869, P. K. Roy was initiated into Brahmanism, along with Ananda Mohan Bose and Aghorenath Chattopadhyay, by Keshab Chandra Sen.

He won a Gilchrist Scholarship to study in England. There he graduated from the University of London in 1873. He was awarded a Doctor of Science degree in psychology from the University of Edinburgh and the University of London in 1876. He and Ananda Mohan Bose together established a Brahmo Samaj, the Indian Association, and a library in England.

== Teaching career ==
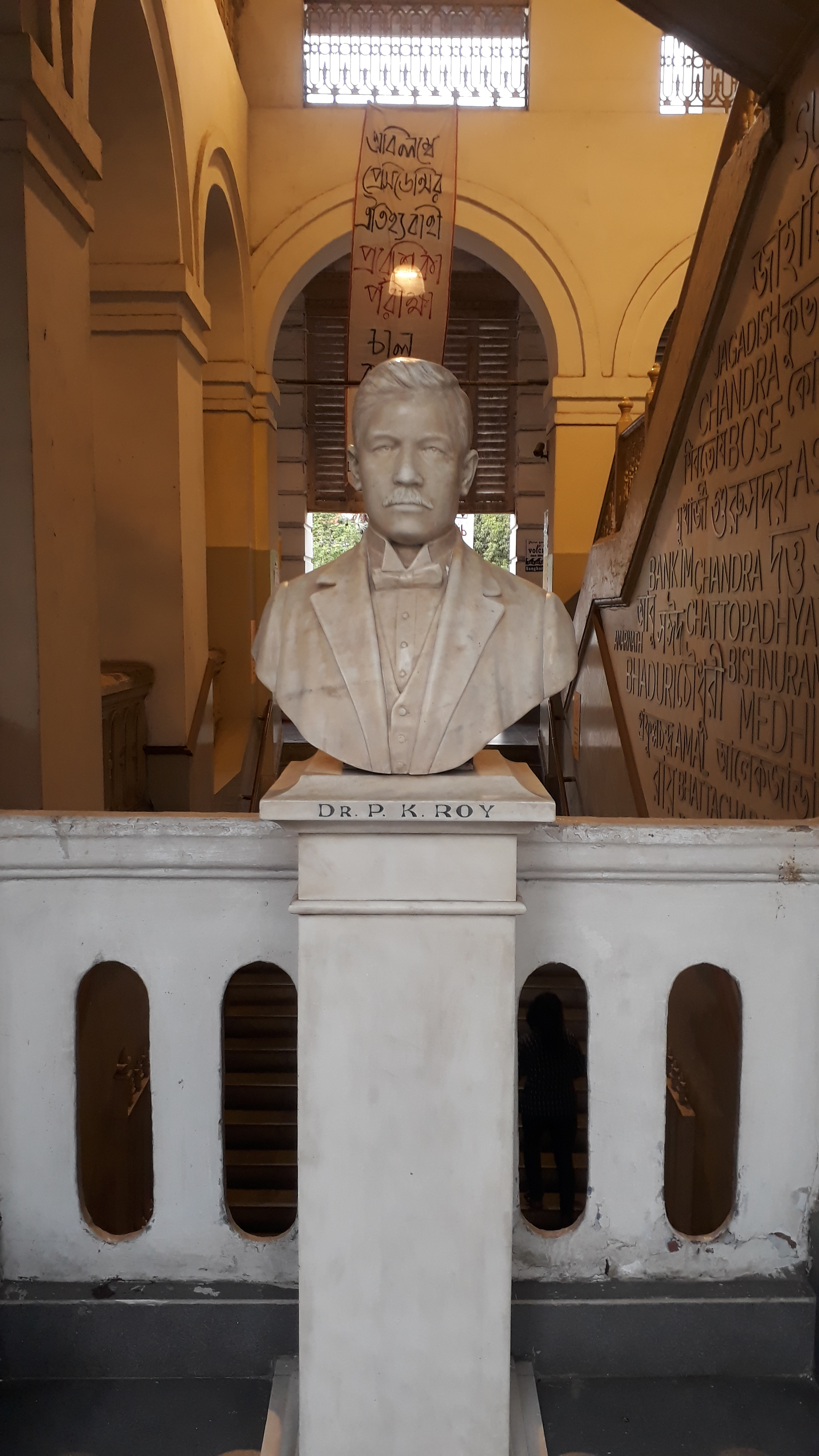
Statue of P. K. Roy in Presidency University

On returning to India, Roy taught at Patna College, Dhaka College, and Presidency College, Kolkata. He was the first Indian to serve as principal of Presidency College, from 1902 to 1905. Thereafter, he became the registrar of the University of Calcutta. On retirement he served as inspector of colleges under the university. He was posted to England for two years as education assistant to the Secretary for India.

Roy was active in the affairs of the Sadharan Brahmo Samaj.

== Family ==
Roy married Sarala, a daughter of Durga Mohan Das. Sarala was a sister of Abala Bose, wife of scientist Jagadish Chandra Bose; among her cousins were Deshbandhu Chittaranjan Das and Sudhi Ranjan Das (later Chief Justice of India).

Roy and Sarala became the parents of a son, Saral Roy, and daughters, Charulata Mukherjee, Kanakalata Roy, Nemima Roy, Dolly Maitland, and Swarnalata Bose. Roy gave his daughter Charulata in marriage to Satish Chandra Mukherjee, the educationist. They became the parents of Air Marshal Subroto Mukerjee, first Indian Chief of Air Staff; the feminist and politician Renuka Ray; and Prasanta Mukherjee, Chairman of the Railway Board 1957-59.

Roy and Sarala's daughter Kanakalata Roy married Jatindra Nath Roy OBE, and one of her grandsons is Bunker Roy, noted social activist and reformer.

His son Saral Ray had a son, Sunil Roy (IFS and ardent environmentalist). Sunil Roy was the Indian Ambassador to Poland and Mexico, High Commissioner to Nigeria and the Indian Consul General in New York City

Roy died in 1932 at Hazaribagh.
