= Satish Ranjan Das =

Indian lawyer (1870–1928)

- Portrait of Das
- Born: 27 June 1870; Naihati, Bengal, British India
- Died: 26 October 1928 (aged 58); Calcutta, Bengal, British India
- Occupation(s): Magistrate, Writer, lecturer
- Parent: Durga Mohan Das
- Relatives: Chittaranjan Das; Sudhi Ranjan Das; Atul Prasad Sen; Shomie Das (grandson)

Satish Ranjan Das (1870–1928) was the Advocate-General of Bengal and later the Law Member of the Executive Council of the Viceroy; he was sometime treasurer of the Boy Scouts of Bengal and the Lodge of Good Fellowship, and a prominent member of the reformist Brahmo Samaj in Bengal. Das was part of a group of moderate Indian nationalists that sought to create a "British-style" public school in India, which ultimately led, after his death, to the creation of The Doon School.

== Early life and career ==
After completing school and university education in England, Das returned to India in 1894. The idea of The Doon School originated from his participation in the"growing search for a national Indian identity."

Although he died seven years before the school actually opened, Das and others in his informal group had lobbied for it during the 1920s. Das and the rest of the group envisaged an Indian school patterned on the British public school, which he felt had effectively trained young men to become responsible and resourceful administrators throughout the British Empire. But in contrast to British schools, the founders of the Doon School wanted an Indian school to be nonsectarian and responsive to Indian aspirations. The founders saw Doon as the training ground for a new generation of Indian leaders who would take over the reins of administration and government following Independence.

By copying the model of the British public school, the founders were attempting to show that Indians could compete with the British on their own terms without relinquishing their national or cultural identity. This reflected the views of many Indian leaders and intellectuals of the time, but certainly not all. Characteristically, Jawaharlal Nehru welcomed the creation of the school but Mohandas K. Gandhi would have nothing to do with it.

In 1922, Das he was appointed Advocate-General of Bengal. In 1927, he became a member of the Viceroy's Executive Council of Lord Irwin.

== Personal life ==
Das was the son of Brahmo Samaj leader and social reformer Durga Mohan Das. His sister Sarala Roy established the Gokhale Memorial Girls' School in Calcutta. Another of his sisters was Abala Bose, eminent feminist and social reformer, who married the pioneering scientist Jagadish Chandra Bose.

S.R. Das married Bonolata Gupta and had two sons, Mohie Ranjan and Dhruba Ranjan Das. His grandson was Indian educationist Shomie Das, a teacher at Gordonstoun School, and later headmaster of the three top boarding schools of India, namely The Doon School, Mayo College and Lawrence School, Sanawar

== Death ==
In the summer of 1928, SR Das spent a good deal of his time in England visiting schools and discussing his scheme with well known educationists. Towards the end of that summer, he returned to India and went to Shimla to resume his duties. He soon became unwell and died in Calcutta on 26 October 1928.
