= Government Teachers' Training College =

Government Teachers' Training College are training centres for Bangladeshi teachers. It may refer to:

- Government Teachers' Training College, Chittagong
- Government Teachers' Training College, Dhaka
- Government Teachers' Training College, Mymensingh
- Government Teachers' Training College, Comilla
- Government Teachers' Training College, Rangpur
