= Chittaranjan Park =

Chittaranjan Park Chittorônjon Park (Bengali)
- Neighborhood of Delhi
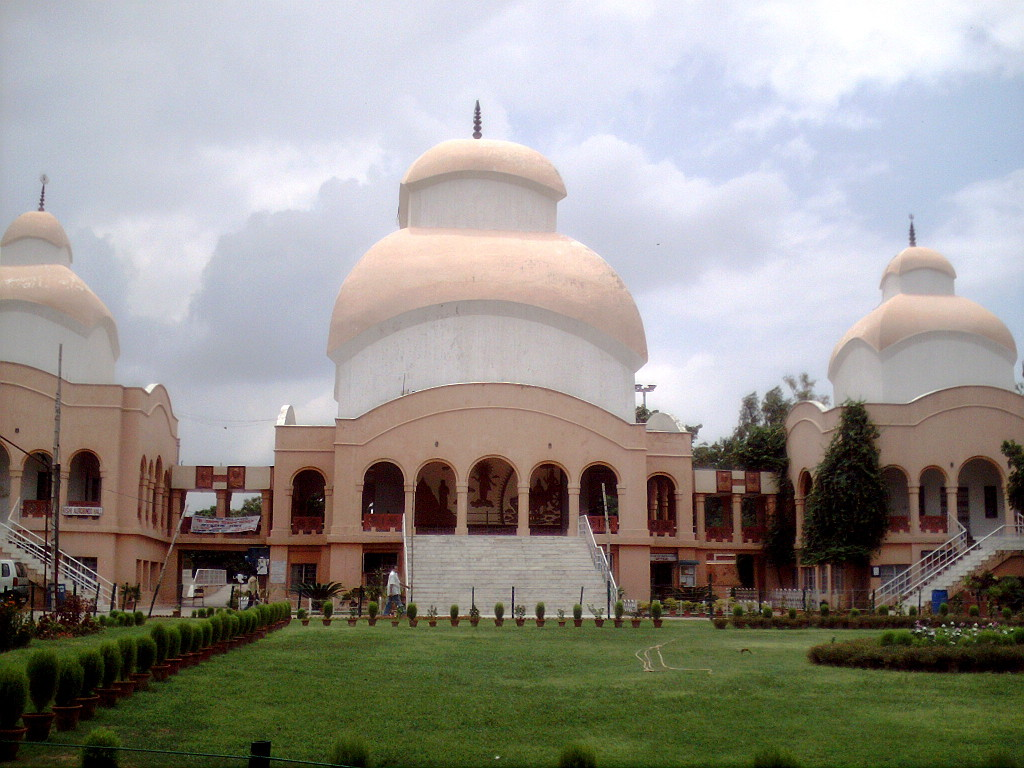
- Chittaranjan Park Kali Mandir, with shrines devoted to Shiva, Kali and Radhakrishna, built in 1984

- Location in Delhi, India
- Coordinates: 28.539592°N 77.247699°E
- Country: India
- State: Delhi
- District: South East Delhi

Languages
  - Official: Hindi, English
- Time zone: UTC+5:30 (IST)
- PIN: 110 019
- Civic agency: MCD

Chittaranjan Park (also known as C.R. Park and Mini Kolkata of Delhi and Mini Bengal of Delhi) is a neighborhood in South East Delhi and home to a large Bengali community. It was established on a rocky terrain in the early 1960s under the name EPDP Colony (East Pakistan Displaced Persons Colony) and later renamed after the deshbandhu (patriot) Chittaranjan Das in the 1980s. Nowadays it is considered among the posh localities in South Delhi due to a rise in the market price of its plots. Despite its growing cosmopolitan nature, it remains home to a large Bengali community and is home to Kolkata-style street-food stalls, Bengali cuisine, fish markets, temples, and cultural centers. It hosts many festivities and cultural events. In Delhi, the festival of Durga Puja is the most celebrated here which boasts of many magnificent marquee.

== Demographics ==
The colony was founded with plots going exclusively to migrants from East Bengal, but over time, the demographics have become a little more pan-Indian, though it continues to attract other Bengalis (West Bengal roots) in general. It has emerged as the most important outpost of Bengali culture in the capital. There is an explosive growth of South Delhi property prices and many famous builders step into this area for the development of infrastructure and it is also an upmarket and affluent neighbourhood.

=== Centre of Bengali Culture in Delhi ===
The first wave of Bengali settlers came to Delhi in the late 1700s and early 1800s. Another essential requirement was that of a Kali Bari. The first Kali Bari of Delhi is the one at Tis Hazari, which still exists (as of October 2024). The idol and Kali Bari were first established in 1826 but the temple was destroyed during the 1857 revolt. The idol was later salvaged and a temple built in Roshan Pura. Space started to fall short to accommodate the devotees, the land was bought and the present temple built at Tis Hazari in 1917. There are more than 25 Kali bari temple and few Durga bari. Moreover, few other temples of Bengali faith are also built in different parts of New Delhi and NCR. The first private Durga Puja in Delhi was celebrated in 1842 by one Majumdar of Rajshahi, followed by some other Puja celebrations that continued for a few years. The first baroyari (community-based) Puja is that of Kashmiri Gate, first started in 1910 and still celebrated with the same fervour and traditions. Kali Bari in Mandir Marg temple built-in 1930. The Big wave of Bengali settled when Calcutta and Delhi were first connected by train in 1864, thereafter with the shifting of capital to New Delhi in 1911, the shifting to government employees' followed logically. The Next big wave settled in 1947 and 1971. Initially employees from central government departments like Post and Telegraph, Government of India Press, Accountant General of Central Revenues (AGCR) and Railways were settled in Timarpur; thereafter in 1924, another phase of government housing came up near Gole Market, for employees of the Secretariat. Over time, many employees, after retirement, settled in Karol Bagh and WEA, and later in South Delhi.

Chittaranjan Park however remains a major centre of Bengali cultural life in New Delhi, the best part is its evening life in the markets and on the streets people doing Adda - a favourite Bengali bhadralok pastime. The Durga Puja celebrations are renowned for their elaborate pandals and cultural functions. The major Durga Puja celebrations are B-Block, Kali Mandir, Co-operative Ground, Mela Ground, and Navapalli (Pocket 40). Auditoriums at Chittaranjan Bhawan and Bipin Pal Bhawan regularly host performances of Bengali theatre and music, which are also occasionally held in the Shiv/Kali Mandir. The week of Durga Puja sees performances by well-known artists and troupes from West Bengal and Bangladesh as well as performances from a group of local people residing at C.R. Park.

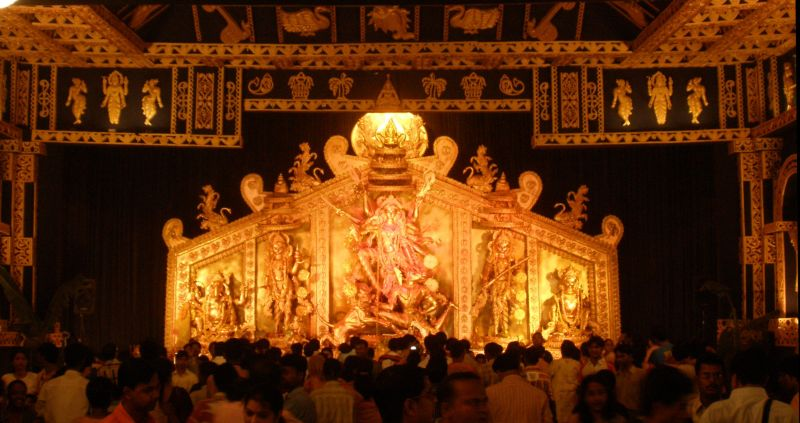
Durga idol at Cooperative Park Puja, Durga Puja 2008

Chittaranjan Park is also home to one of the city's main markets for freshwater fish, an integral part of Bengali cuisine, a large Kali temple, several cultural centres, four big markets specialising in Bengali sweets and numerous stalls selling Calcutta-style street food - chops, cutlets, kathi rolls, phuchka, real estate sector and jhaalmuri etc. The best of which can be found around the 4 major markets in the area. The markets are known as Market-1, Market-2, Market-3 and Market-4.

Raisana Bengali School is situated beside the Chittaranjan Park Kali Bari . Almost 75% of students in this school are Bengali.

== History ==
In 1954, an association was formed for the inhabitants from East Bengal who were displaced from their homes in East Pakistan during the Partition of India and the associated. A large group of government officers hailing from the erstwhile East Bengal migrated to Delhi and lobbied for a residential neighbourhood. Leading roles were taken by Chandra Kumar Mukherjee, Subodh Gopal Basumallik, Ashutosh Dutta, Bimal Bhusan Chakraborty, and the Chief Election Commissioner, Shyamaprasanna Senverma. In the 1960s, land was assigned in a barren rocky area in the then-distant Southern areas. Members were required to provide some documentation of their residential status, and were required to be "already residing in Delhi and gainfully employed in the capital"; based on this, 2147 people were given plots of land, initially on lease for 99 years, but subsequently converted into freehold ownership. The role of Delhi Development Authority i.e. DDA also needs some mention here. Many people who could not afford to build a house in their plot of land got DDA to build houses for them and they gradually paid off the cost of construction as instalments every year.

The original layout had the two-thousand odd plots, divided into eleven blocks A-K, along with a number of markets and cultural spaces. However, in the 1990s, 714 displaced families were accommodated among those who had not been able to meet the earlier deadline. This resulted in new blocks, called M, N, O, P, K-1, K-2, Pocket 40 (referred to as Navapalli), Pocket 52 (referred to as Dakhinpalli ) and Pocket-K. The main thoroughfare of the colony is Bipin Chandra Pal Marg. Institutions of note are a branch of the Raisina Bengali School, Kali Mandir (also called the Shiv Mandir), Bangiya Samaj and Chittaranjan Bhawan.

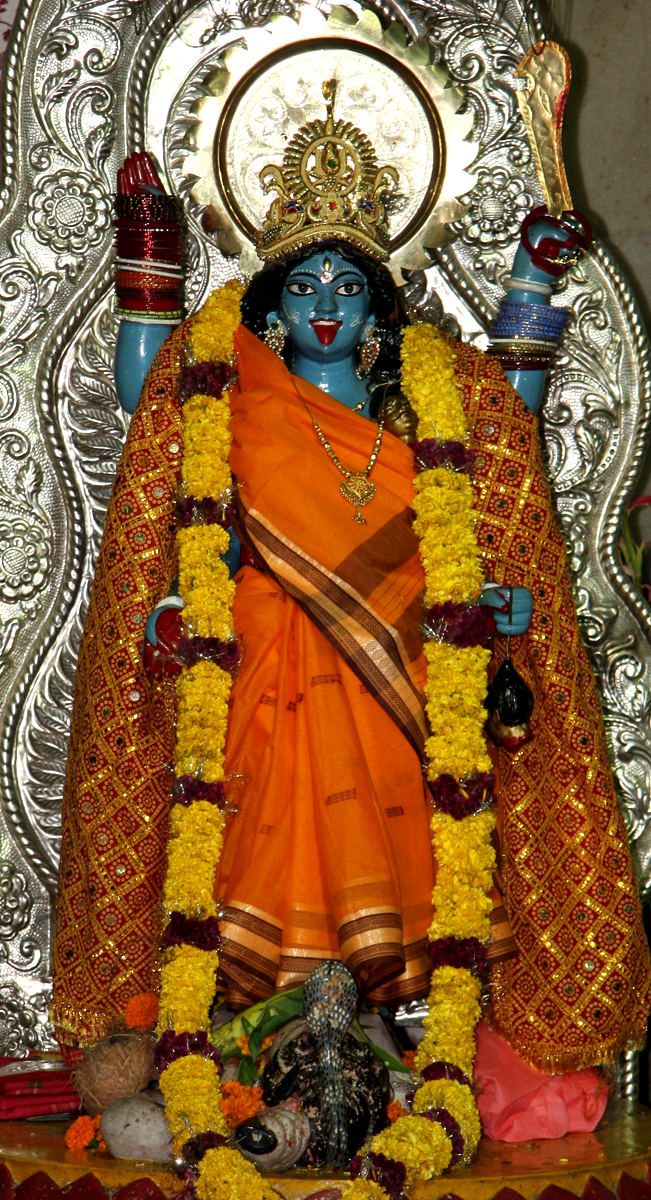
Kali idol at Chittaranjan Park Kali Mandir, CR Park.

Chittaranjan Park is bordered by Kalkaji, Greater Kailash I and II, Alaknanda and Govindpuri. It is adjacent to the business centre at Nehru Place. The present Chittaranjan Park area was initially known as EPDP (East Pakistan Displaced Persons) Colony and subsequently, it was changed and named PURBACHAL and finally called CHITTARANJAN PARK.

== Notable residents ==
Most of the residents are eminent ex-government servants, scholars, professors, teachers and other professionals. The most eminent residents of the neighbourhood include:

- Pratip Chaudhuri, former SBI Bank Chairman
- Shantanu Moitra, Score composer, Musician and Pianist
- Dwaipayan Bhattacharyya, JNU Professor
- Debu Chaudhuri, Famous Sitarist
- Prateek Chaudhuri, DU Professor

== Access ==
The Indira Gandhi International Airport is 17 km (Terminal 1) and 23 km (Terminal 3) from Chittaranjan Park. The New Delhi railway station is 16 km, and the Hazrat Nizamuddin Railway Station 9 km away.

The Nehru Enclave and Greater Kailash metro stations on Magenta Line of the Delhi Metro are within 1 km from Pocket 40/B /A Block of Chittaranjan Park. The Violet Line of the Delhi Metro also has a stop at the Nehru Place station within 1 km from B-block in Chittaranjan Park. GK-II is almost an extension of Chittaranjan Park while GK-I is about 2 km away from Chittaranjan Park.

== See also ==
- Areas And Zones of New Delhi
