= Sudhi Ranjan Das =

5th Chief Justice of India (1894–1977)

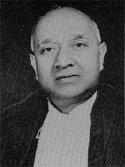
- Sudhi Ranjan Das, Chief Justice of India

5th Chief Justice of India
- In office 1 February 1956 – 30 September 1959
- Appointed by: Rajendra Prasad
- Preceded by: Bijan Kumar Mukherjea
- Succeeded by: Bhuvaneshwar Prasad Sinha

Judge of Supreme Court of India
- In office 28 January 1950 – 31 January 1956
- Appointed by: Rajendra Prasad
- Chief Justice: H. J. Kania

Judge of Federal Court of India
- In office 20 January 1950 – 27 January 1950
- Nominated by: H. J. Kania
- Appointed by: C. Rajagopalachari

2nd Chief Justice of Punjab and Haryana High Court
- In office 19 January 1949 – 19 January 1950
- Appointed by: C. Rajagopalachari
- Preceded by: Ram Lall
- Succeeded by: Eric Weston

Judge of Calcutta High Court
- In office 1 December 1942 – 18 January 1949
- Appointed by: Lord Linlithgow
- Chief Justice: Harold Derbyshire

Personal details
- Born: 1 October 1894 Calcutta, Bengal Presidency, British India
- Died: 18 September 1977 (aged 82)
- Relations: Ashoke Sen (son-in-law); Chittaranjan Das, Sarala Roy, Abala Bose, Satish Ranjan Das (cousins)
- Children: 3 including Suranjan Das
- Education: LL. B. (Hons.)
- Alma mater: Patha Bhavana, Bangabasi College University of Calcutta, University College London, Scottish Church College

Sudhi Ranjan Das (1 October 1894 – 18 September 1977) was the 5th Chief Justice of India, serving from 1 February 1956 to 30 September 1959. Das also served as chairman of The Statesman.

== Background and education ==
S.R. Das was born in Calcutta into the prominent Baidya Das family (originally Dasgupta) of Telirbagh. He was born to Rakhal Chandra Das and Binodini Das.

He attended Patha Bhavana, Santiniketan, where he was one of the first four pupils of Rabindranath Tagore. After finishing his intermediate examinations at the Scottish Church College, he moved on to the Bangabasi College which was affiliated to the University of Calcutta from which he graduated. He later studied law at University College London and was awarded first-class honours LL.B. from University of London in 1918.

He was called to the Bar in 1918 at Gray's Inn, London.

== Judicial career ==
He was elevated to the Bench as an Additional Judge of Calcutta High Court in 1942. He became a Puisne Judge, Calcutta High Court in 1944.

He served as the Chief Justice of Punjab High Court from 1949 to 1950.

He was appointed to the Federal Court/Supreme Court of India in 1950, days before the commencement of the new Constitution. He officiated twice as Acting Chief Justice of India before holding the highest Judicial office of the country- Chief Justice of India for over three years. He retired on 30 September 1959.

Over the course of his career on the Supreme Court, Das authored 160 judgments and sat on 560 benches. During Das's tenure as Chief Justice, the Supreme Court grew from eight to eleven judges. Six of the ten judges that Das appointed to the Court would eventually serve as Chief Justice.

As Chief Justice of India, he administered the oath of office to 1st President of India Rajendra Prasad when he was elected as President for a second term after the 1957 Indian presidential election.

== Family life ==
Sudhi Ranjan Das was married to Swapna Majumdar, the daughter of S.B. Majumdar, an ICS officer. By his wife, he had two sons, Group Captain Suranjan Das and Suhrid Ranjan Das, and a daughter, Anjana. His daughter married his junior counsel Ashoke Sen, who later became Union Law Minister. His children were all named by Rabindranath Tagore.

Deshbandhu Chittaranjan Das, Sarala Roy, Abhla Bose and Satish Ranjan Das are his cousins.

== 1, Safdurjung Road ==
The bungalow at 1, Safdurjung Road used by then Prime Minister Indira Gandhi as her residence was priorly inhabited by Chief Justice S.R. Das. This bungalow witnessed the assassination of the PM Mrs. Indira Gandhi in 1984. It is now a museum.
