= Aparna Devi =

Indian singer

Aparna Devi (1899–1962), educated at Loreto High School and the daughter of Chittaranjan Das, was an Indian writer in Odia language.

== See also ==
- List of Odia writers
