= Romola Sinha =

Indian politician

Romola Sinha (1913–2010) was a women's right and social activist from Bengal, Calcutta, India.

She was also known as Mrs. S. K. Sinha, after her husband, the Rt. Hon. Sushil Kumar Sinha, ICS, who was a well known Magistrate and Collector and a member of elite Baron Sinha family of Raipur. Her husband was the second son of Lord Satyendra Prasanno Sinha of Raipur, an eminent lawyer, who was the only Indian Governor of Bihar and Orissa, and the only Indian to be raised to the House of Lords before independence. She was involved with social works and women's rights activism from her early age. She was noted for their fight for abolition of Devdasi system, prostitution and rehabilitation of children of prostitutes.

She was founder member of All Bengal Women's Union since 1932 along with other women activists from Bengal like Suniti Devi, the Maharani of Cooch Behar, Charulata Mukherjee, Sucharu Devi, the Maharani of Mayurbhanj and T. R. Nelly. After passing of The Bengal Suppression of Immoral Traffic Bill, 1933, the ABWU rescued girls and started a rehabilitation home called the All Bengal Women's Industrial Institute at Dumdum. Romola Sinha, who later became first chairperson of Central Social Welfare Board in West Bengal, an institution founded at national level by Durgabai Deshmukh. She was also first Secretary of All Bengal Women's Union in 1932 founded under Presidency of Maharani Suniti Devi of Cooch Behar and later became President of ABWU for many years. She later worked along with her other contemporaries like Renuka Ray, Seeta Chaudhuri, Arati Sen and was a guiding light to later generation women activists from West Bengal like Sheila Davar, Bela Sen, Manek Modi, Jaya Chaliha, Pranati Ghosal and Khorshed Narielwala.
