= Government Teachers' Training College, Mymensingh =

Government Teachers Training College, Mymensingh

Location
- Mymensingh Sadar, Mymensingh; Bangladesh
- Coordinates: 24.7654°N 90.4013°E

Information
- Type: Government
- Established: 15 November 1948; 76 years ago
- Campus type: Urban
- Affiliation: National University
- Website: ttcco.mymensingh.gov.bd

Government Teachers Training College, Mymensingh is an educational institution located in Mymensingh, Bangladesh. It offers bachelor's and master's degrees in education.

== History ==
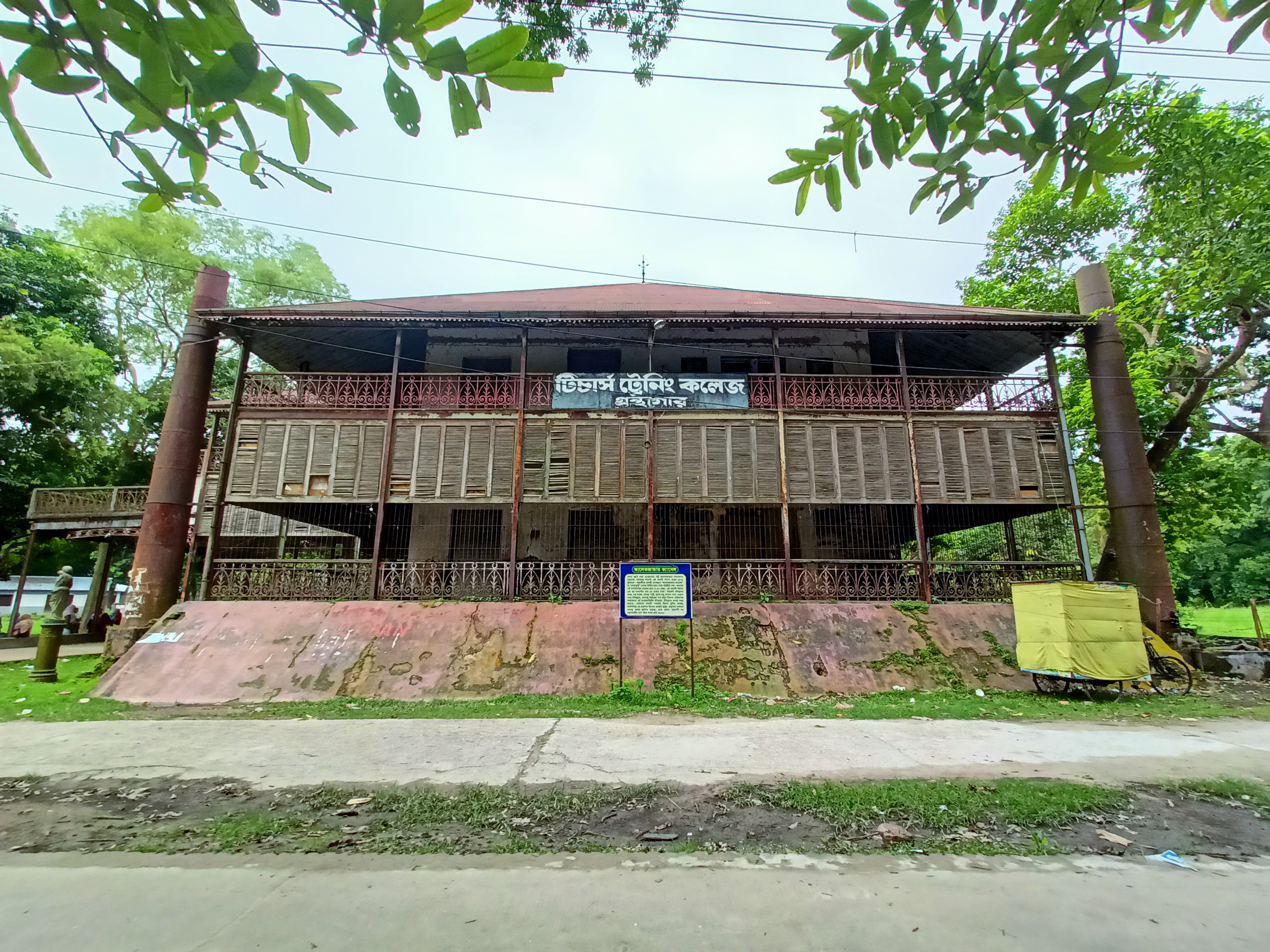
Library Building (Alexander Castle)

The Teachers Training College was established in 1948 on 27.15 acres of land in Alexander Castle. It was first used as a classroom. Later, when several large buildings were built in the college, the teachers' residence was moved to the second floor of the castle. Since then Alexander Castle has been used as a library. The 8-room building contains about 15,000 books.
