= Chittaranjan Park Kali Mandir =

Hindu temple in New Delhi, India

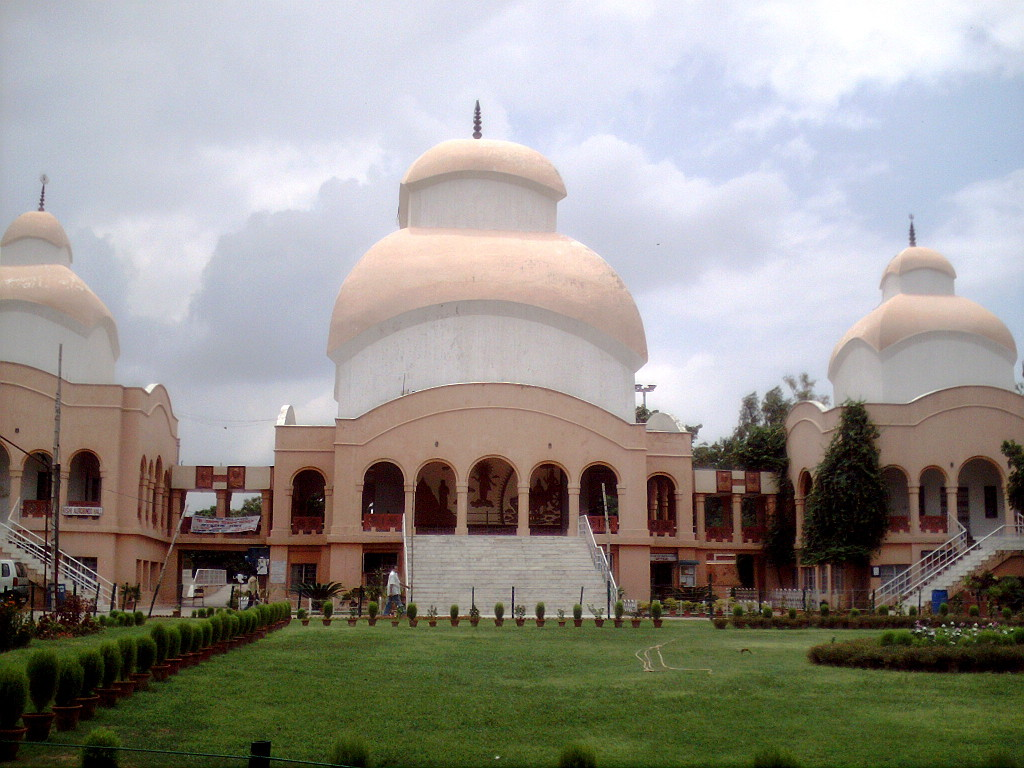

- Location in Delhi

Religion
- Affiliation: Hinduism
- District: Chittaranjan Park
- Deity: Kali, Shiva, Radha Krishna
- Governing body: Chittaranjan Park Kali Mandir Society
- Status: Active

Location
- Location: Chittaranjan Park
- State: South East Delhi, Delhi
- Country: India
- Coordinates: 28°32′12″N 77°14′51″E

Website
- crparkkalimandir.org

Chittaranjan Park Kali Mandir is a Hindu temple and Bengali community cultural center in Chittaranjan Park in South East Delhi, India. Built on a small hill, it started as a Shiv temple in 1973, which still stands within the complex, the larger shrines dedicated to goddess Kali, Shiva, and Radhakrishna were added in 1984. Over the years it has remained an important centre of convergence of local Bengali community during annual Durga Puja festivities. The temple also hosted its first Durga Puja in 1977, a tradition that continues to date.

== History ==
It was founded in 1973, on land designated by the nascent EPDP colony, and a small temple to Shiva was consecrated on small hill at the edge of the colony. The tradition of Durga Puja started in 1977. Expansion of the devotee base enabled the construction of an imposing Kali temple in February 1984 in Bengal terracotta temple architecture. This was followed by two temples, one for Shiva and the other for Radha-Krishna. The temples was overlaid with elaborate terracotta designs around 2006–2009.

The Kali Mandir is a hub of Bengali activity owing to the high density of Bengalis residing in Chittaranjan Park. Managed by the Chittaranjan Park Kali Mandir Society, it organizes a number of cultural and religious events throughout the year.

== Pujas and Festivals ==
Religious functions include the major five-day festival of Durga Puja, which is one of the most popular in Delhi and attracts enormous crowds every day. The rituals are observed with great fidelity; barrels of bengal-specific flowers are flown in fresh for the puja every day. For procuring sufficient quantities of blue lotus, needed for sandhi puja, entire ponds from Bengal are booked well in advance. Other religious functions at the Mandir include Kali Puja, Lakshmi Puja, Saraswati Puja, Ganesh Chaturthi etc. The mandir attracts a large volume of donations from devotees, particularly during the Durga Puja period. There is also a small atelier where artists create the earthen idols of durga and other goddesses.

The Mandir also houses a large library with books on various aspects of Bengali culture and runs Bengali language classes. A number of cultural programmes and competitions are organized for children. The mandir also manages a guest house. Recently, In 2025 Durga Puja for the first time in history of Kali Mandir and entire Chittaranjan Park the Indian Prime Minister (Narendra Modi) visited to seek blessings from Goddess Durga.

== Gallery ==
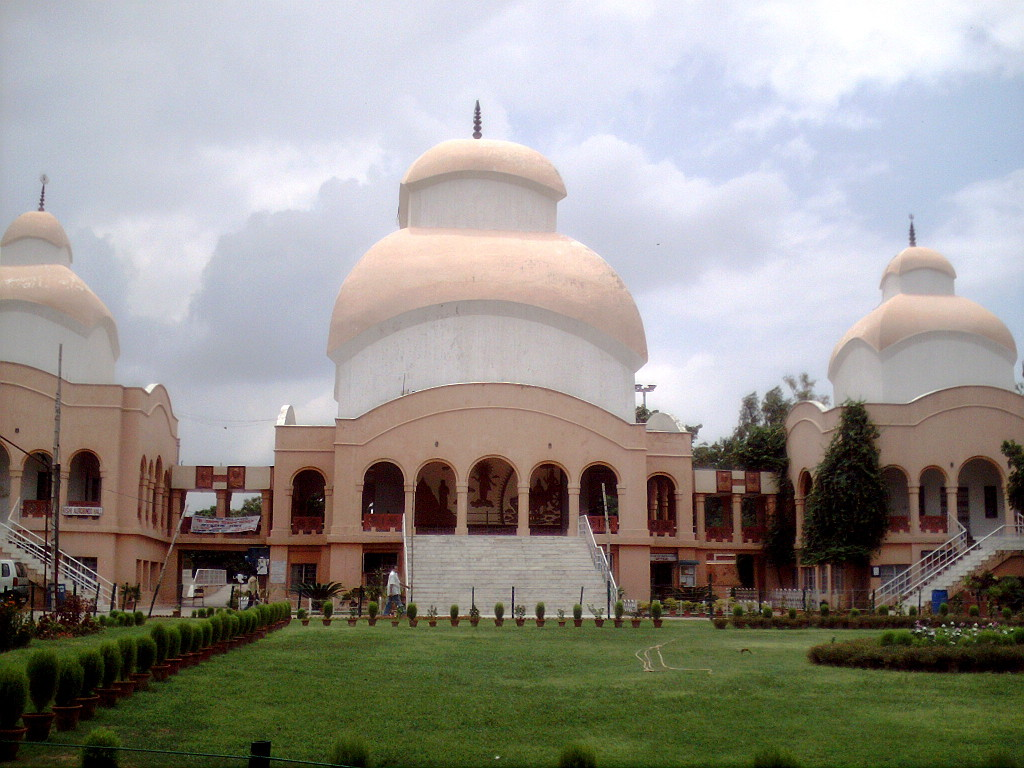
Kali mandir facade, from the main access direction, with Shiva (left) and Radhakrishna (right) temples. The temples themselves open on the other side.

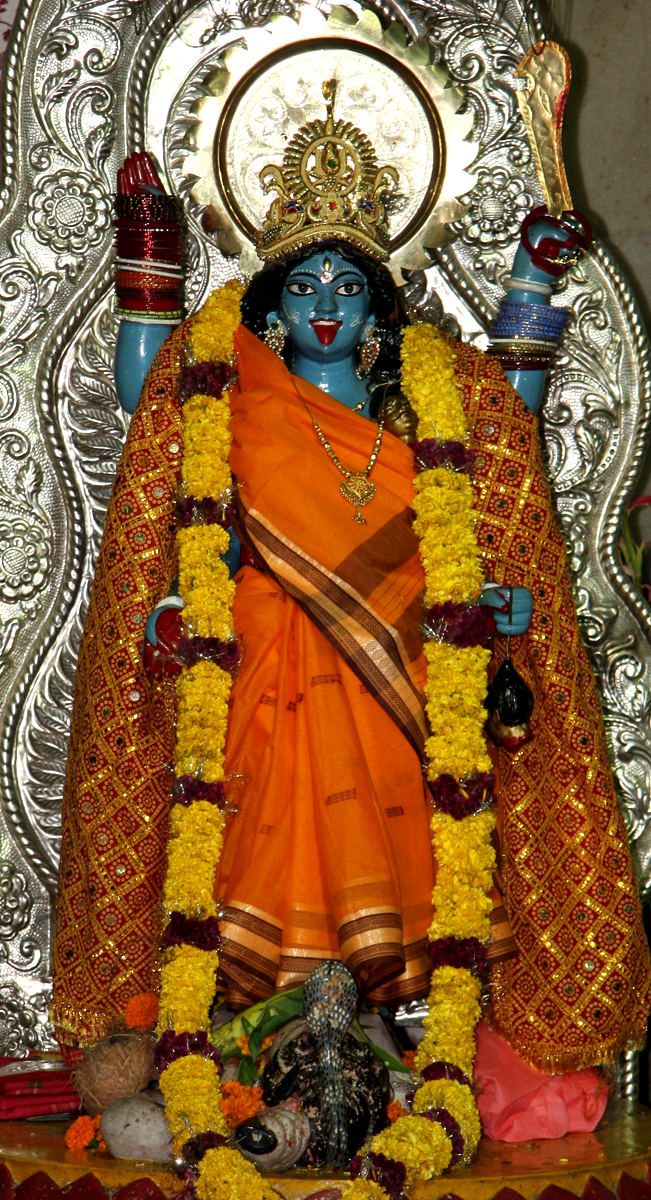
Kali idol at the mandir

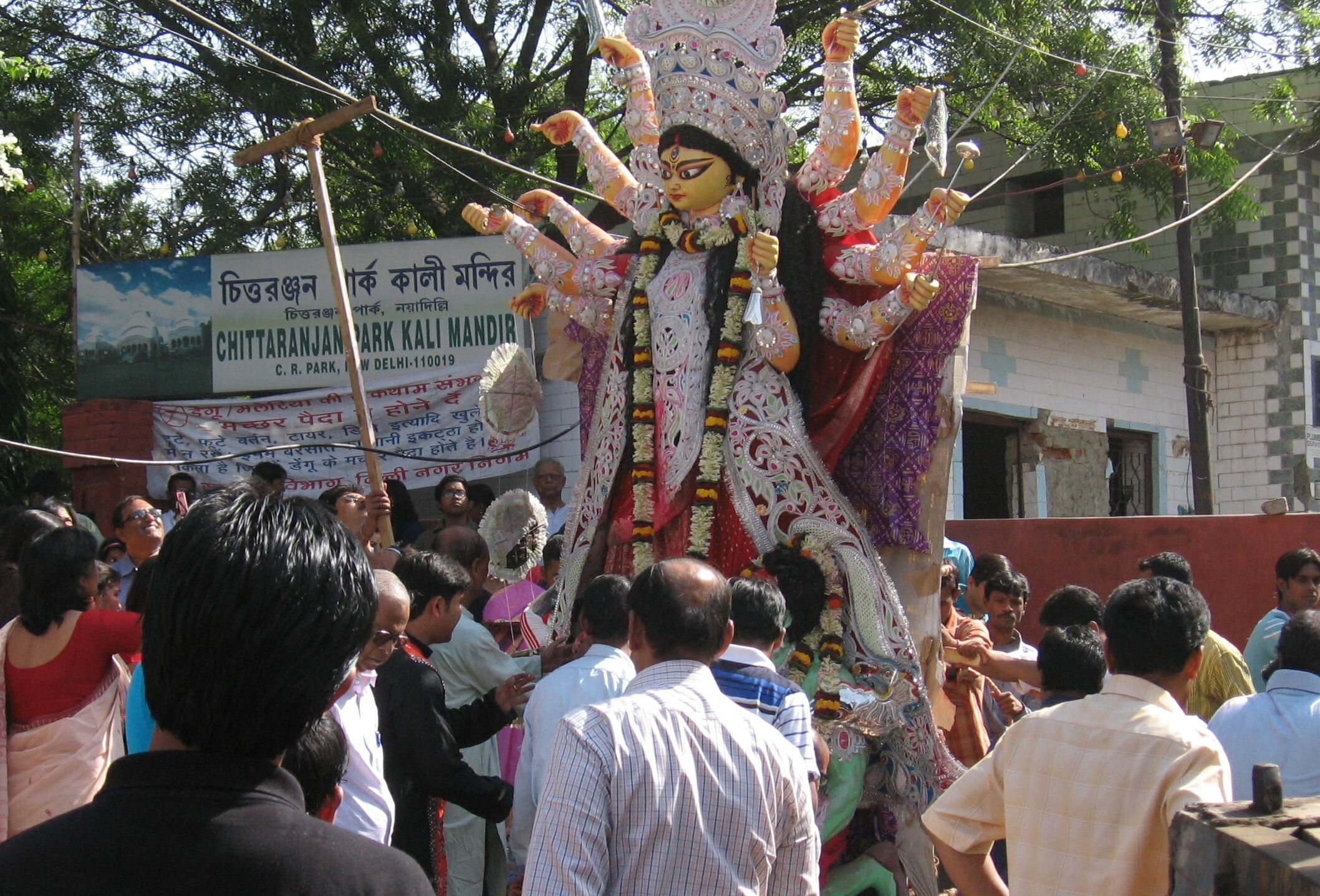
Durga Puja at Chittaranjan Park Kali Mandir (2004): the large durga idol is physically lifted onto a truck while devotees offer their tearful goodbyes.

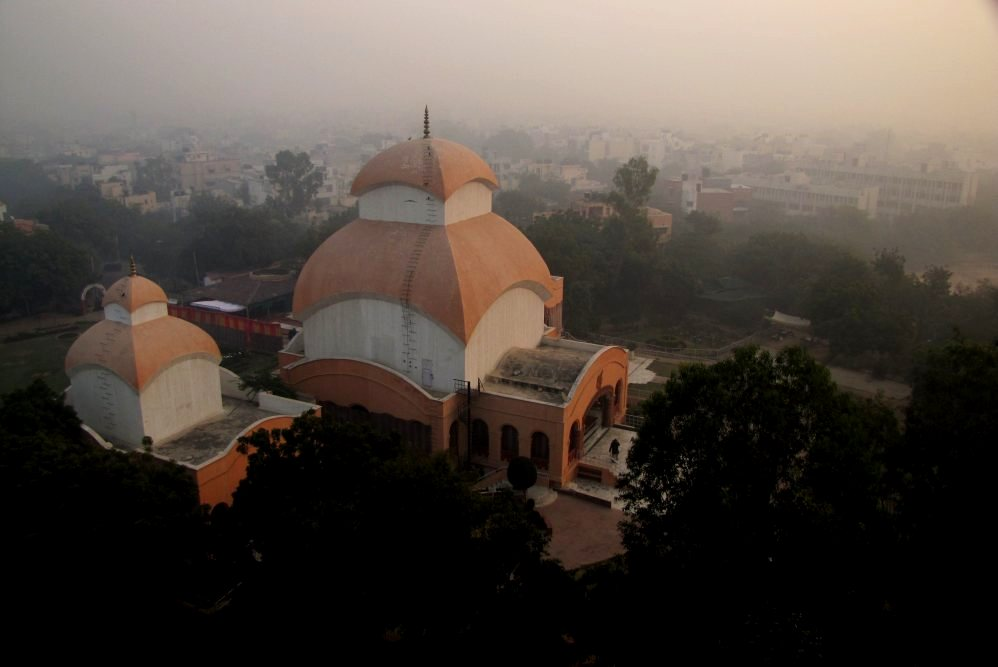
Temple at sunrise from the top of nearby water tank. the entrance to the main kali temple can be seen at center.
