= Charulata Mukherjee =

Indian women's rights activist and social worker

Charulata Mukherjee was an Indian women's rights activist and social worker from Calcutta. She was associated with Brahmo Samaj and All India Women's Conference..

== Work ==
She was an active member of AIWC and worked with other contemporaries like Rajkumari Amrit Kaur, Rani Rajwade, Muthulakshmi Reddi, Hansa Mehta and others. At Bengal front, she worked along her daughter Renuka Ray and Romola Sinha, who were noted for their fight for abolition of Devdasi system, prostitution and rehabilitation of children of prostitutes.

== Personal life ==
She was daughter of Dr P. K. Roy and Sarala Roy. She was married to Satish Chandra Mukherjee. Air Marshal Subroto Mukerjee, Prosanto Mukherjee and Renuka Ray were her sons and daughter.
