= Sarala Roy =

Indian educator, feminist and social worker (1861–1946)

- Born: 1861; Calcutta, Bengal Presidency, British India
- Died: 1946 (aged 84–85); Kolkata, India
- Occupation: Social worker
- Organization: All India Women's Conference (elected president in 1932)
- Known for: Feminist movement
- Spouse: Prasanna Kumar Roy

Sarala Roy (1861–1946) was an Indian educator, feminist, and social activist. She was one of the first women to matriculate from Calcutta University, and was the first woman to be a member of the University Senate. She founded a school for girls and several women's educational charities, and was a founding member and later, the President of the All India Women's Conference. As President of the All India Women's Conference in 1932, she played a key role in organizing efforts towards women's suffrage, and against child marriage. She was also a strong supporter of educational rights for women and girls.

== Early life and education ==
She was the daughter of Durga Mohan Das, a prominent social reformer, and her sister, Abala Bose, was also a noted educator. Along with physician Kadambini Ganguly, Roy was one of the first women to be allowed sit the Matriculation exams to graduate from Calcutta University, and she later became the first woman to be a member of the Calcutta University Senate.

== Notable work ==
Roy was active in the 1920s in efforts to improve access for education for women and girls.

In 1905, she established a local women's organisation in Bengal named the Mahila Samiti. and in 1914, created a second organisation called the Indian Women's Education Society, which was dedicated to funding scholarships for women to study in the United Kingdom. She established the Gokhale Memorial Girls' School in Kolkata in 1920, which was named after Indian independence movement leader Gopalkrishna Gokhale, with whom she maintained a close friendship. Roy trained the teachers at the school herself, and the school made many innovative developments in curriculum, including instructing all their students in three languages: Bengali, Hindi and English. She had also established a range of extra-curricular educational activities in the school, that encompassed sports, music, and theater, and it was common to perform music and songs composed by the writer and Nobel laureate, Rabindranath Tagore, with whom Roy was acquainted. She was also closely involved with the Sakhi Samiti, an organisation founded by poet, novelist and social worker, Swarnakumari Devi which promoted Indian handicrafts and published several magazines and literary journals in Bengali and English. Her friendship with the Tagore family is reflected in the fact that Rabindranath Tagore dedicated his play, Mayar Khela, to Roy.

Along with Rokeya Sekhawat Hussain, the Bengali science fiction writer and activist, Sarala Roy and her sister, the teacher Abala Bose, worked with the Bengal Women's Education League in the 1920s, to improve access to education for women and children. In 1927, they organised the Bengal Education Conference from 16 to 19 April, and during this conference, Roy, Bose and Hussain made speeches calling for changes to school curriculum, with a particular focus on increasing awareness of the personal rights of women. The All India Women's Conference was created in the same year, and Roy, along with Sarojini Naidu, Kamaladevi Chattopadhyay, Muthulakshmi Reddy and Rajkumari Amrit Kaur, was a founding member of this significant and powerful women's rights organisation in colonial India.

In 1932, Sarala Roy became the President of the All Indian Women's Conference. Roy became president at a time when there was significant momentum towards social reform around the extension of franchise to Indian women. There were wide differences in opinion on the development of efforts towards achieving franchise for women, and along with Dorothy Jinarajadasa, Radhabai Subbarayan and Begum Shah Nawaz, Roy was instrumental in collecting statements and opinions from women on the subject. During her Presidential Address, Ray gave a speech arguing that the key to reforms was to strengthen education for girls, and that this would be critical in efforts to end the prevalent practice of child marriage.

== Personal life ==
Sarala Roy was the daughter of Brahmo Samaj leader and social reformer Durga Mohan Das. She married Prasanna Kumar Roy, an educator and the first principal of Presidency College in Kolkata, and they had a son, Saral Roy, who died early. Saral Roy had a son, Sunil Roy (IFS and ardent environmentalist). Sunil Roy was the Indian Ambassador to Poland and Mexico, High Commissioner to Nigeria and the Indian Consul General in New York City. His son Ashish Roy married Supriya, who was a teacher at Modern High School; they have a daughter, Ananya Roy, Professor at the University of California at Berkeley.

She also had 5 daughters –

1. Charulata Mukherjee (Mini), who was closely associated with the All India Women's Conference, was the eldest, followed by Swarnalata Bose, Kanakalata Roy, Dolly Maitland, and Nenima Roy. Charulata married Satish Chandra Mukherjee. First Chief of Air Staff in India, Air Marshal Subroto Mukherjee, Prasanta Mukherjee and Renuka Ray (the noted freedom fighter, social activist and politician) were her children.

2. Swarnalata Bose (Mina) married PK Bose, who was a barrister at Dhaka. They had two sons, Akshay Kumar Bose (married Muriel Penman; had one daughter, Romola Das (1934-), who has 2 sons, Rajib and Sanjay) and Jagat Kishore Bose (married Santa Dutt, grand-daughter of RC Dutt, who had a son, Rajat Bose and daughter, Lolita Nehru), and three daughters, Kamala, Monorama (Butlu), and Anila (Bhona). Kamala Dutt had three daughters, Runjhun, Uma, and Sheila. Monorama Bose never married. She went to London for higher studies and later became a distinguished educationist, serving as Inspectress of Schools and Principal of Rani Birla College, Calcutta, for a long period of time through the 1970s and '80s. Anila Bose married the eminent physicist, Satis Ranjan Khastgir, who was Reader at Dhaka University alongside Satyen Bose until partition, retiring as Khaira Professor of Physics at Calcutta University. They had a son, Shiva Ranjan Khastgir (1935-2019), who had 2 daughters: Rosinka Chaudhuri (Director and Professor, CSSSC) and Priyanka Khastgir Saha.

3. The next daughter, Kanakalata Roy, married Jatindra Nath Roy OBE who was Commissioner of Bengal. She had two sons, Togo and Nogi; Togo had three sons, Ashish, Nitish, and Pantu Roy. Nogi had two sons, Shankar Roy and Bunker Roy, noted social activist and reformer.

4. Dolly Maitland married an Englishman and went to live in Britain - she died young. They had one son, Marne Maitland, married to Bettina.

5. The youngest daughter Sakuntala Roy (Nenima) never married.

Sarala Roy's siblings were the eminent feminist and social worker Abala Bose who married the pioneering scientist Acharya Jagadish Chandra Bose, and Satish Ranjan Das Advocate-General of Bengal and later the Law Member of the Executive Council of the Viceroy as well as founder of The Doon School.
