= Alexandra Castle =

18th-century palace in Mymensingh

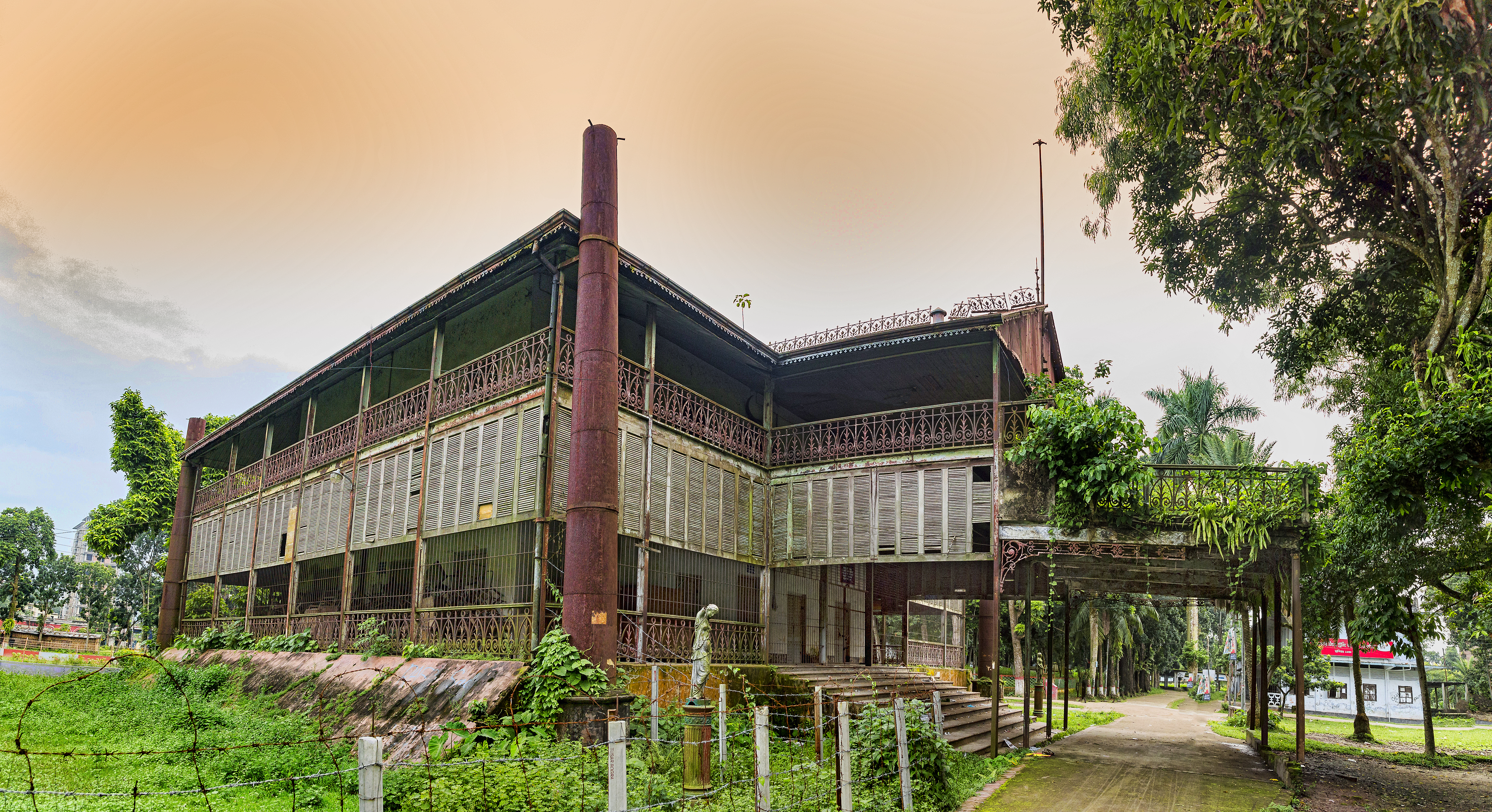
- Interactive map of the Alexandra Castle area

General information
- Location: Mymensingh Sadar, Mymensingh, Mymensingh, Bangladesh
- Coordinates: 24.7657°N 90.4019°E

Alexandra Castle (Bengali: আলেকজান্ডার ক্যাসল) is an 18th-century palace located in the city of Mymensingh, Bangladesh. Alexandra Castle is one of the ancient structures of Mymensingh city. It is located near Court-Kachari in the heart of the city.

== History ==
Maharaja Sukanta Suryakant Acharya Chowdhury built this palace on the occasion of the centenary celebration of the establishment of Mymensingh district established in 1787 AD. The palace was built in 1889 AD. It cost 45 thousand rupees at that time. It was popularly known as "Iron Kuthi" due to the use of iron in building construction. At present it is being used as the library of the Teacher Training College. The building was named 'Alexandra Castle' after Alexandra, wife of the then Emperor Edward VII of India. Later it became popularly known as Alexander Castle or Iron Castle.

In 1879, at a cost of 45,000 rupees, a beautiful bungalow-style garden house, Lohar Kuthi or Alexandra's Castle, was built on this land. Inside the castle was a white stone floor. After its construction, the building was decorated with various royal furniture. The premises have ponds and gardens.

Many distinguished persons have stayed in this palace. On 15 February 1926, Rabindranath Tagore came to Mymensingh on the invitation of the Maharaja. At that time, the poet's travel companions were his son Rathindranath, daughter-in-law Pratima Devi, Dinendranath Tagore, Italian principal Joseph Tucci and others. For four days till 19 February, Kavi stayed at Guru Suryakanta's Bagan Bari Alexandra Castle. Many distinguished persons have stayed in this palace. Poet Rabindranath Tagore wrote many poems while sitting on a giant tree while staying at Alexandra Castle. Mahatma Gandhi came in the same year. Lord Curzon, Chittaranjan Das, Nawab Sir Salimullah, Kamal Pasha, Maulvi Wajed Ali Khan Panni, Netaji Subhash Chandra Bose and others also entered here.

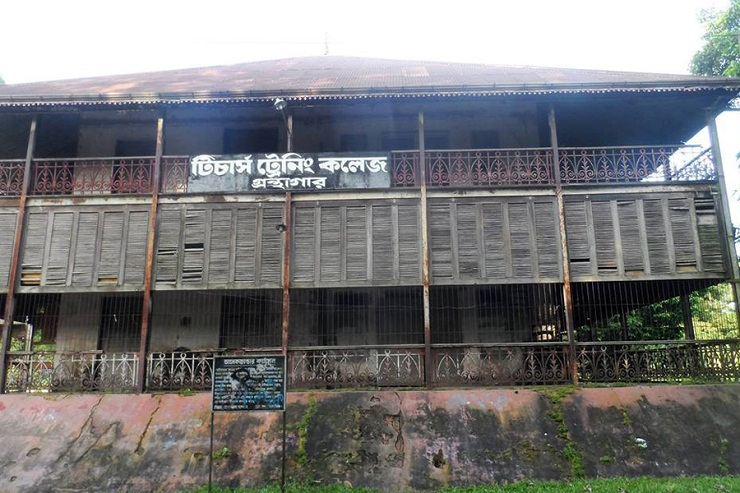
Currently Teachers Training College Library

== Gallery ==
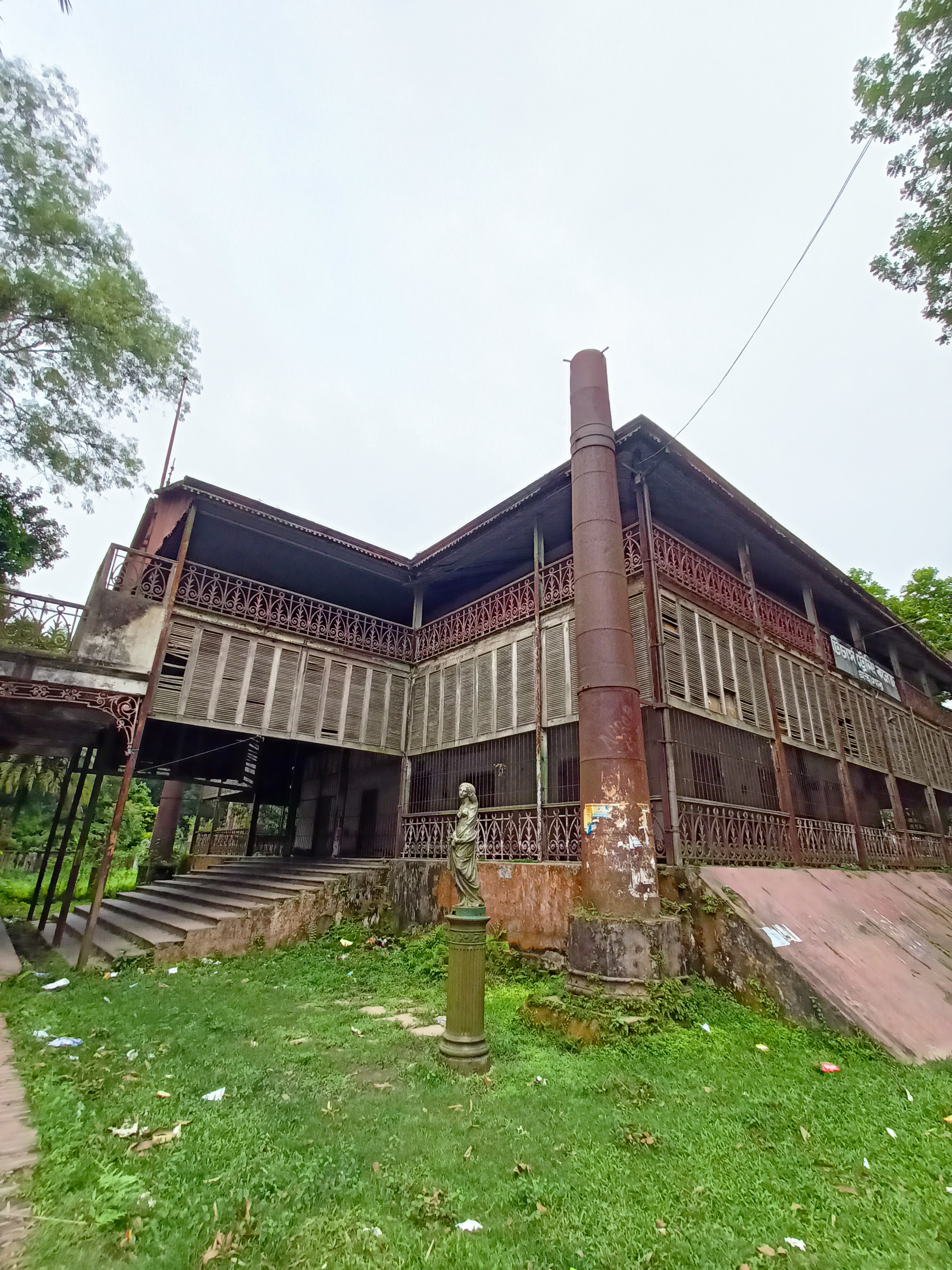

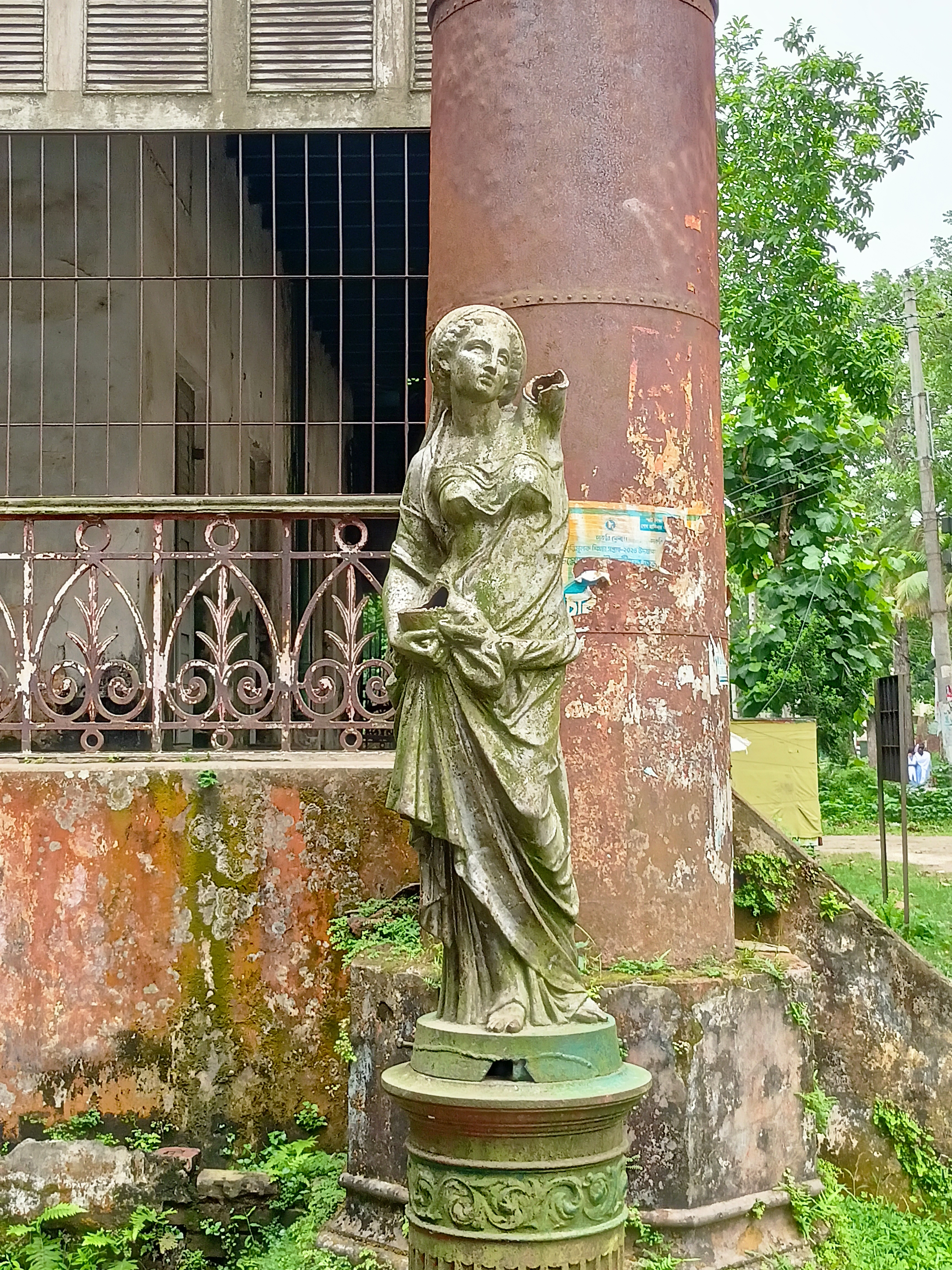

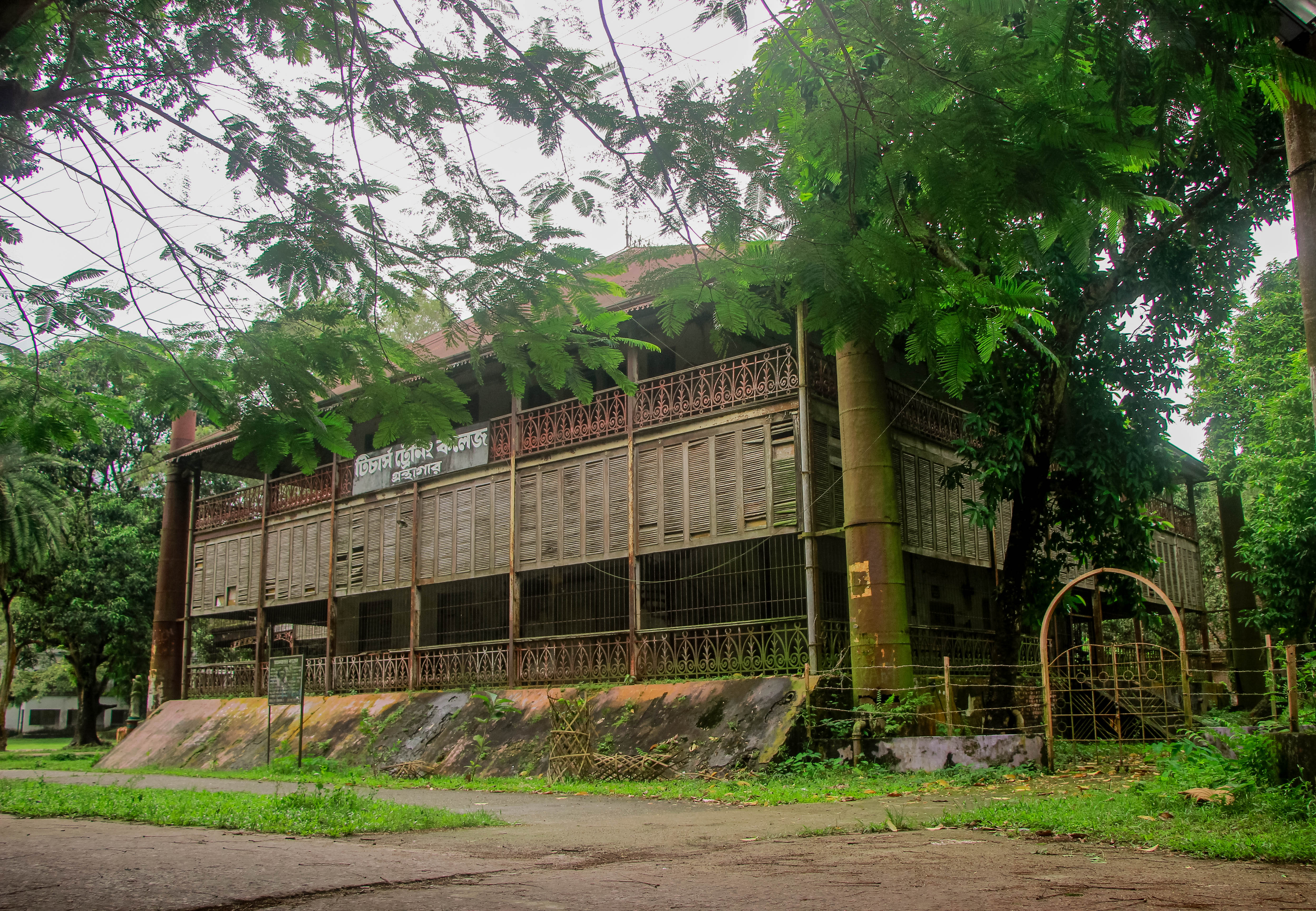

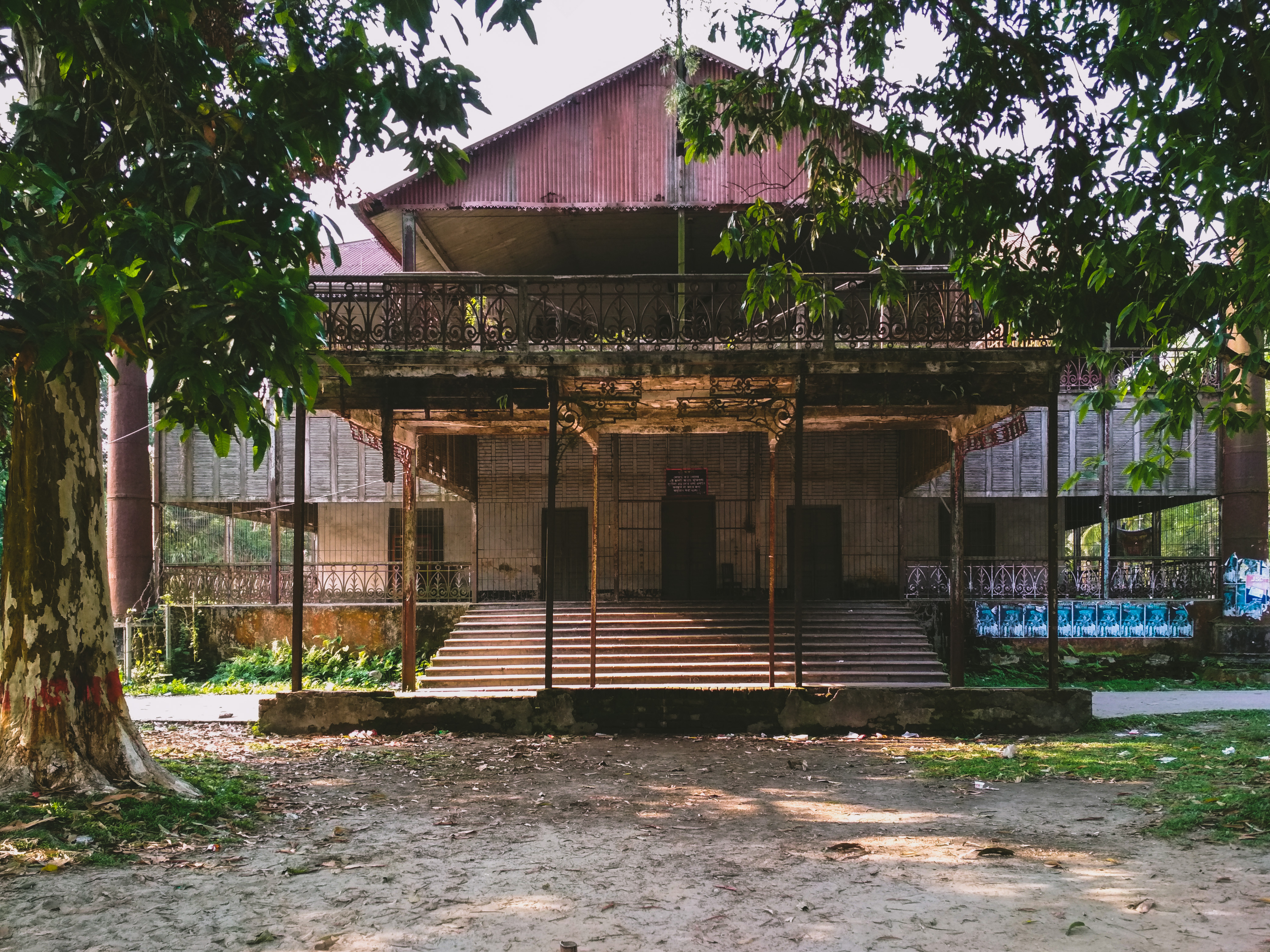

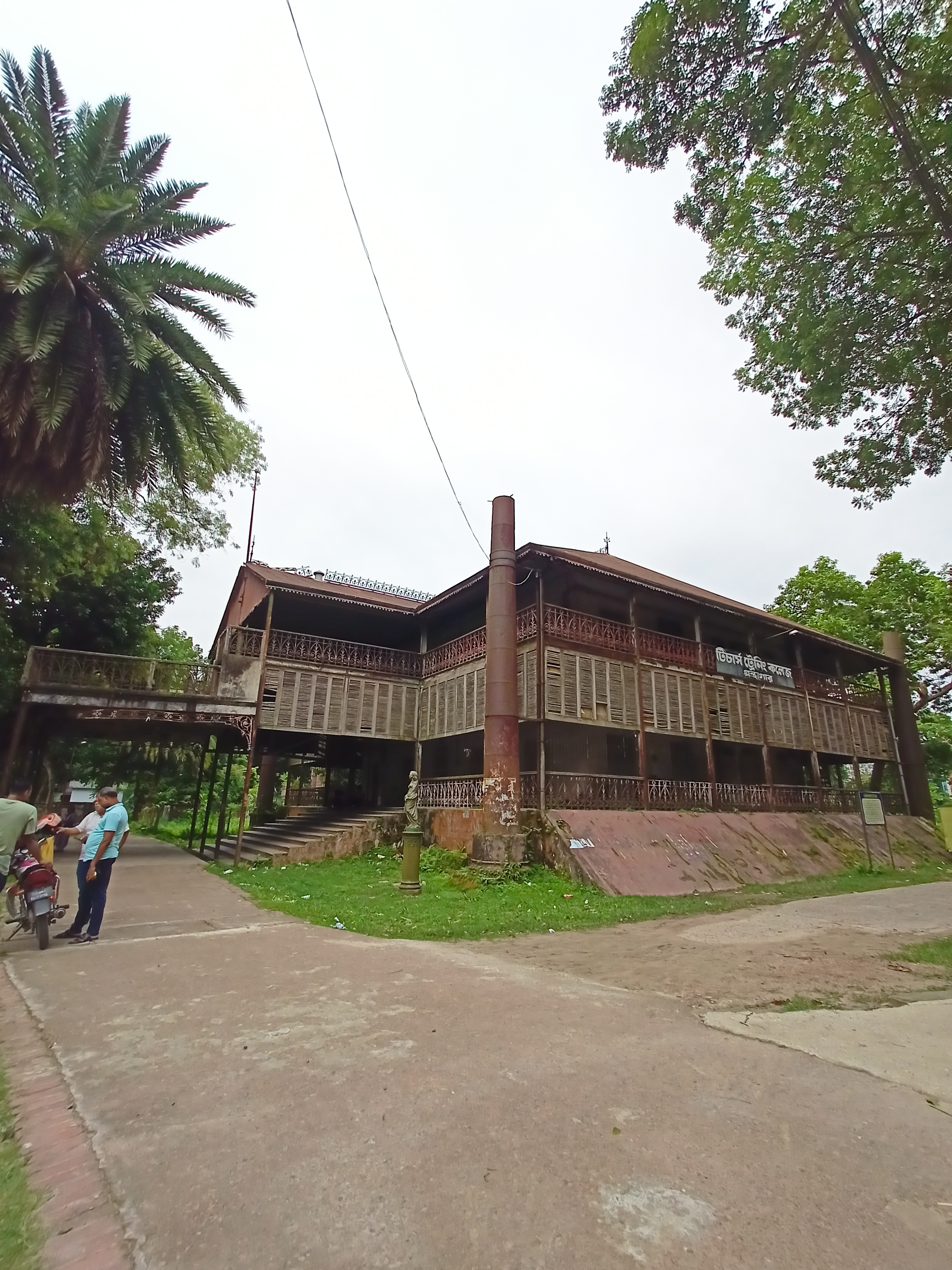

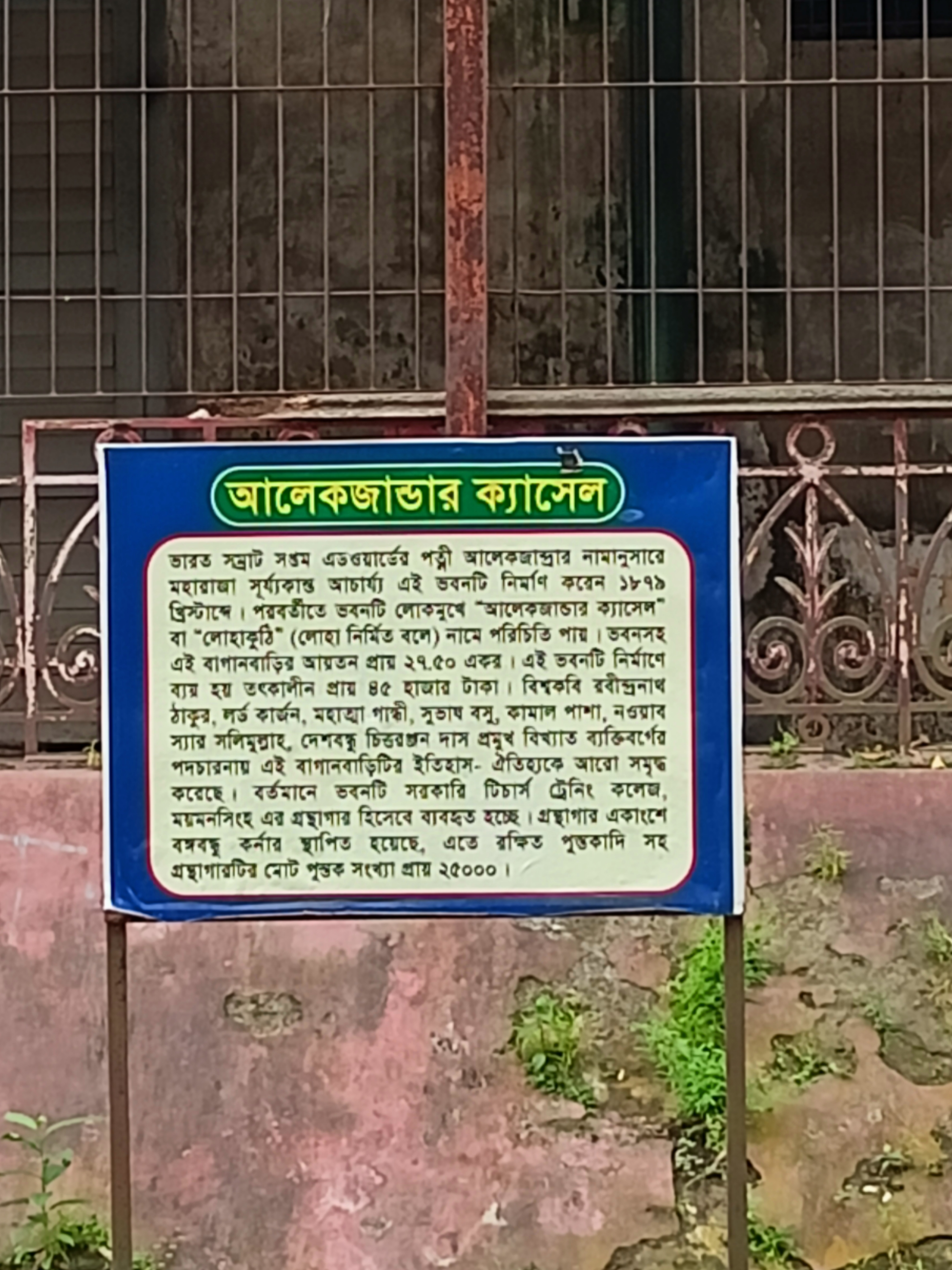

== See also ==
- List of archaeological sites in Bangladesh
