= Atul Prasad Sen =

Bengali composer

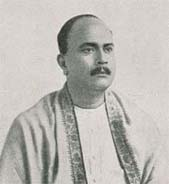
- Atul Prasad Sen
- Born: 20 October 1871; Dacca, Bengal, British India
- Died: 26 August 1934 (aged 62); Lucknow, Agra and Oudh, British India
- Occupations: Advocate, poet, educationist, lawyer
- Writing career
- Years active: 1900–1934
- Period: Bengal Renaissance

Atul Prasad Sen (Bengali: অতুলপ্রসাদ সেন; 20 October 1871 – 26 August 1934) was a Bengali composer, lyricist, singer, writer, lawyer, philanthropist and educationist.

== Early life ==
Atul Prasad Sen was born as the eldest child of Ram Prasad Sen and Hemanta Shashi, in a Vaidya family from the village of Magor in South Bikrampur, Faridpur District, presently located in Bangladesh.

Atul was born in his maternal uncle's house in Dhaka, following the custom at that time. His maternal grandfather, Kali Narayan Gupta, initiated Atul Prasad into music and devotional songs. Atul Prasad's mother later married Brahmo Samaj reformer Durga Mohan Das in June 1890.

Initially Atul Prasad could not accept this marriage. In time, his relationship became very congenial with Durga Mohan and Hemanta Shashi. Sarala Devi recounted in her diary জীবনের ঝরাপাতা (fallen leaves of life) that Durga Mohan, after the death of his wife Brahmoamoyee, in spite of his busy outward life, took great care of his children. It was his elder daughter, Abala, whose eager and consistent effort towards the wellbeing of her aging father convinced Durga Mohan to marry Hemanta Shashi. Durga Mohan extended every possible care to his stepchildren too, and treated them as his own children.

== Education ==
After passing the entrance examination in 1890, Atul Prasad was admitted to Presidency College in Kolkata, and in November of the same year, he took a voyage to England to study law. (Note: Gandhiji went to London in 1988 and passed the London Mariculation in 1890. He was called to the Bar in 1891. Atul Prasad took the voyage to London during November 1890 It is not known whether Gandhiji and Atul Prasad ever met while staying at London.)

In London he befriended Sri Aurobindo Ghosh, Chittaranjan Das, Sarojini Naidu and Dwijendralal Ray.

== Profession - phase one, Calcutta ==
After becoming a barrister, he returned to Bengal in 1894 and joined with Satyendra Prasanno Sinha, (Lord Sinha), as a Bar-at-Law. Successively he opened a law practice in Kolkata in a rented apartment at 82 Circular Road. When his step-father Durgamohan died on 19 December 1897, he opened a practice in Rangpur court.

The High Court at Calcutta, which used to be known as the High Court of Judicature at Fort William in Bengal, was established and formally opened on 1 July 1862. Atul Prasad was called to the bar in Calcutta High Court in 1895. He was a member of the Bar Library Club of Calcutta High Court.

It was mentioned in The High Court of Calcutta - 125th Anniversary Souvenir 1862-1987:

The ecstatic resonance of Atul Prasad Sen's (1896) lyrics is heard in every Bengali home. Again, the poet of 'The Song of the Ocean' (Sagara-Sangeet) in his Vaishnavite melody surrendered himself completely to the Almighty.

The High Court at Calcutta - 150 Years: An Overview remembered Atul Prasad in this fashion:

Atul Prasad Sen (1896), a member of the Club, was a poet, lyricist, composer and a lawyer all moulded in one, whose songs and poems inspired many a young heart in pre-independence days and are cherished even today.

== Marriage ==
Atul Prasad married his cousin sister Hem Kusum, daughter of Krishna Govinda Gupta, ICS and Prasanna Tara Gupta. The marriage was disapproved by their family members. The couple wedded at Gretna Old Parish Church, Gretna Green, Scotland, under Scottish law in the year 1900. However, Atul Prasad had a troubled married life. The emotional sufferings he experienced in his life found their way into his lyrics; and this has made many of his songs full of pathos.

His twin sons, born in 1901, were Dilip Kumar and Nilip Kumar. Nilip died after six month of his birth.

== Profession - phase two, Lucknow ==
After his marriage Atul Prasad started practicing law at Old Baily, London and continued for a very short duration. Then with the help of Bipin Bihari Basu and upon advised by his friend Mumtaj Hussain, an advocate in Lucknow, he came back to India in 1902. He chose the province of Oudh as his field of activity and moved to Lucknow.

== Activities in Lucknow ==
Literary activities

In 1922 the first conference of Bengali literary personages outside Bengal (Prabasi Banga-Sahitya Sammelan, presently known as Nikhil Bharat Banga Sahitya Sammelan) was organised at Benaras with patronage from distinguished 'Bengalis living outside Bengal' (Prabasis) like Atul Prasad Sen, Radha Kamal Mukherjee, Kedar Nath Bandyopadhyay and Mahendra Chandra Roy, which was presided over by Rabindranath Tagore. Atul Prasad initiated and edited Uttara, the Bengali magazine of the organisation, to keep alive the Bengali culture among the Bengali Diaspora. Later, he presided over its Kanpur and Gorakhpur conventions. He was also editor of Allahabad Law Journal and Awadh Weekly Notes.

Bengali Club of Lucknow

Since 1903 Atul Prasad served the Bengali Club of Lucknow, which was founded by Atul Krishna Singh, as the president. In 1929, he initiated the idea of merging of the Bengali Club and the Young Men's Association of Lucknow, and thus emerged a new organisation to be known as Bengali Club and Young Men's Association. A photograph of Atul Prasad is uploaded in the website of the club.

Political activities

Atul Prasad played an active role in national politics between 1905 and 1921. He was a close associate of Gopal Krishna Gokhale. In 1905, when Gokhale was elected president of the Indian National Congress and was at the height of his political power, he founded the Servants of India Society to specifically further one of the causes dearest to his heart: the expansion of Indian education. Atul Prasad was sympathetic to nationalistic movement and extended his support and generosity to Congress Party and Servants of India Society founded by Gopal Krishna Gokhale. He joined Indian National Congress and represented Oudh in several annual conventions. He acted as Vice Chairman of Lucknow Municipal Corporation. In 1917 he joined in the Liberal Party.

Other social activities

He actively took part in conversion of Lucknow Canning College founded by Raja Dakshina Ranjan Mukhopadhyay to Lucknow University and acted as a member of the first Executive Committee. He extended aid to many educational institutions.

Atul Prasad Sen Memorial Girls' College, Lucknow, established in 1902 under the name Mahalaki Pathshala, humbly bears the name of its principal patron. From Mahakali Pathshala, the name was changed to Harimati Balika Vidyalaya. In 1933 it received temporary recognition for High School and intermediate from U.P Board. It was at this time it acquired the name Jubilee-girls School. In 1944, the school received permanent recognition for High school. It advanced to an Inter college in 1947, and to a Degree College in 1955.

Residence at Lucknow

Atul Prasad built his residence in Kesharbag area at Lucknow, which was located next to the labour court complex. The cost of the building was around thirty three thousand Indian Rupee. The building was demolished and does not exist now. It is so unfortunate that such a nice specimen of colonial architecture, the famous residence of Atul Prasad Sen which witnessed visit of so many distinguished personalities of pre-Independent India, is no more. A photograph of the house is available in the website of Sri Ramakrishna Math & Ramakrishna Mission Sevashrama, Lucknow.

The A P Sen Road, running in front of the residence, was named after him during his lifetime. This road still runs in Charbag area of Lucknow.

== Contribution in music ==
=== Classical songs ===
Atul Prasad used fast-paced Hindustani tunes like Kheyal, Thumri and Dadra skilfully, and was able to add an element of spontaneity on occasions when the tune has transcended the lyrics.

Atul Prasad is credited with introducing the Thumri style in Bengali music. He also pioneered introduction of Ghazals in Bengali.

Atul Prasad's acquaintances with maestros in Urdu and Persian Ghazal inspired him to experiment this particular style to be brought into Bengali music. He created around six or seven Ghazals in Bengali and pioneered a stream of Bengali music which was later enriched profusely by contribution of Kazi Nazrul Islam.

Atul Prasad's introduction of the raga to the Bangla songs had a significant impact on Bengali music, and influenced the songs of Kazi Nazrul Islam and other raga-based modern songs. The songs created by him are known as অতুলপ্রসাদের গান (Atul Prasad's song).

=== Atul Prasad's Song (অতুলপ্রসাদের গান) ===
Atul Prasad wrote 212 poems and except a few most of the poems were used as song. Unfortunately none of the songs were dated. Only three among these 212 poems were titled (অর্ঘ্য, সাগরবক্ষে জ্যোৎস্নাসুন্দরী, প্রত্যাবর্তন).

Atul Prasad himself, in his book গীতিগুঞ্জ (Geetigunja), arranged his songs into five broad categories: দেবতা (Devotional), প্রকৃতি (Nature), স্বদেশ (Patriotic), মানব (Humanity) and বিবিধ (others). He did not explicitly categorize any of his songs into the category of love. However, many of his songs, having multi-layered association of deep emotional sentiments, bloom into expression of love and lug deep shadow of sadness, which was his constant companion.

Devotional songs;

Atul Prasad was a follower of Brahmo faith, which was initiated in Calcutta in 1828 by Raja Ram Mohan Roy and Dwarkanath Tagore as reformation of the prevailing Brahmanism of the time. Atul Prasad created many songs devoted to Brahmo faith. Also, some of his compositions are dedicated to faith of Vaishnavism (worshiper of Vishnu or Sri Krishna - হরি), Shaivism (worshiper of Shiva - শিব) and Shaktism, where the metaphysical reality is considered feminine (Mother Kali or Mother Universal - শক্তি).

Patriotic songs

Atul Prasad helped to awaken nationalism in colonial India by creating various patriotic songs. During his first voyage to England in 1890, Atul Prasad passed through Italy and, being inspired by the tune of the Gondola rowers' song in Venice, he composed his patriotic song, উঠ গো ভারত-লক্ষ্মী..:

উঠ গো ভারত-লক্ষ্মী, উঠ আদি-জগত-জন-পূজ্যা,
দুঃখ দৈন্য সব নাশি করো দূরিত ভারত-লজ্জা।
ছাড়ো গো ছাড়ো শোকশয্যা, কর সজ্জা
পুনঃ কনক-কমল-ধন-ধান্যে!

Goddess of grace of India,
O rise you world-respected!
End all woes and sorrows, and
Remove her shame dejected!

The movement against the partition of Bengal during 1905-11 inspired creation of patriotic songs which helped in propagation of Swadeshi movement ideologies. Rabindranath Tagore, Atulprasad Sen, Dwijendralal Roy, Rajanikanta Sen, Mukunda Das, Kamini Kumar Bhattacharya, Aswini Kumar Datta, Manmohan Chakravarty, Satish Chandra Banerjee and many others composed various patriotic songs in support of the movement.

Ideology of Unity in Diversity and Indian Pluralism was conceived and urged by Atul Prasad in this song.

Sahana Devi, (Note: Atul Prasad was her father's sister's son. Her mother Tarala Devi was the elder sister of Deshbandhu Chittaranjan Das) Autl Prasad's cousin, edited and published 70 songs, along with her staff notations, in কাকলি (Kakali) in two volumes. (Note: Atul Prasad himself wrote the preface of the book)

In 1932 three recording companies having Indian ownership were born in Calcutta, one of which was Hindusthan Music Products Ltd, founded by Chandi Charan Saha. Chandi Charan approached Rabindranath Tagore for contributing his voice in the first record under the banner of Hinduasthan Records. In July 1932, Rabindranath Tagore sang, তবু মনে রেখো in the house no. 6/1, Akrur Datta Lane near Subodh Mallick Square. The second record consisted of two songs sung by Atul Prasad Sen, being the only instance the poet recorded his voice.

== Friends, relatives and acquaintances ==
Rabindranath Tagore

A deep friendship grew between Rabindranth and Atulprasad. Rabindranath Tagore initiated Khamkheyali Sabha along with Gaganendranath Tagore at Jorasako, and its meeting on 5 February 1897 was attended by Atul Prasad Sen and Chittaranjan Das, among other dignitaries.

Atul Prasad mentioned this event in his memoirs and recapitulated:

He invited me to stay with him at Ramgarh for some days. I came hurriedly from Lucknau to Ramgarh. One day there was heavy rain which continued late in the night. We had an assembly of rainy season on that day. From afternoon till at ten o'clock at night, the poet (Rabindranath) recited poems written by him one after another and sung many songs of rainy season. I couldn't forget that day. At about eight in the night our dinner was made ready. The daughter and daughter-in-law of the poet was waiting at the door, but neither the poet nor any of us could take notice of them. In that sitting Rabindranath requested me, "Atul, will you please sing a Hindi song of your locality?". I sang, "Maharaja keoriya kholo, rasaki bund pare". It was a timely song, and everybody liked it. The poet accompanied me in the song. Even the song touched Andrews who was ignorant of the song. He accompanied me loudly with his strange pronunciation and wrong tuned voice.

Tagore's second visit to Lucknow was during 5 to 10 March 1923, when he addressed the Convocation of Lucknow University. Tagore was basically travelling across India on a lecture tour to raise money for Visva-Varati. Atul Prasad arranged a musical durbar in his honour and invited famous Indian classical singers of Lucknow at his residence. Tagore, while proceeding further to Bombay en route to Ahmedabad by train, composed a song, appreciating the event, তোমার শেষের গানের রেশ নিয়ে কানে চলে এসেছি ওগো কেউ কি তা জানে.

Dilip Kumar Roy

Dilip Kumar Roy (22 January 1897 – 6 January 1980) was a Bengali Indian musician, musicologist, novelist, poet, essayist, and was an ardent follower of Sri Aurobindo. He was the son of Dwijendralal Ray. in 1922 while young Dilip Kumar was on a tour studying Indian classical music from various great masters, he came to Lucknow, and here in the house of Atul Prasad Sen he met Ronald Nixon, a professor at Lucknow University, who introduced Dilip to ideologies of Sri Aurobindo. Dilip Kumar became a close collaborator of Atul Prasad, and immensely contributed, along with pursuing in versatile field of activities, in popularising Atul Prasad's songs. (Note on date of event: 1922)

Kumar Prasad Mukherjee

Kumar Prasad Mukherjee quoted from his father Dhurjati Prasad Mukerji's memoir মনে এলো (Mone Elo):

I heard Abdul Karim when he was at the peak of his powers. It was a few days after the death of Deshbandhu C. R. Das. What an extraordinary gathering that was – Rabindranath Tagore, Mahatma Gandhi, Atul Prasad Sen and Sharat Chandra Chatterjee, the novelist, all were there in Dilip Kumar Roy's house ... Tagore's appreciation was "saccha", true. He would close his eyes and be lost to the world. Atul Prasad got so carried away on occasions that he had to be controlled." (Note on date of event: 1925-26 - after demise of Chittaranjan Das on 16 June 1925.)

Sachin Dev Burman

Sachin Deb Burman mentioned in his memoirs:

Shamlal Babu was a famous and very popular harmonium player and Thumri singer, and from him I learnt Thumri. He introduced me to noted singer Girija Kishore Chakravarty and Durjati Prasad Mukhopadhyay of Lucknow. Later, Dhurjati Babu introduced me to learned Atul Prasad Sen. Atul Prasad was very pleased to hear my songs. During that time I got acquainted with film director Sudhirendra Sanyal and subsequently joined New Theatres. Even when I started working as an independent composer, Atul Prasad wrote songs for me, and used to appreciate my songs with all his heart.

Satyajit Ray

Satyajit Ray had a lasting impression of Atul Prasad, his maternal uncle, on him. He remembered Atul Prasad "indulging in a great display of Urdu manners". In his memoir, he wrote:

I have a few memories of a visit to Lucknow, where we stayed first with my mother's cousin, Atul Prasad Sen, and then with his sister, whom I called Chhutki Mashi. There was always music in Atul Mama's house, for he was a lyricist and composer. Often he would get my mother to learn his songs, then write the words down for her in her black notebook. Ravi Shankar's guru, Alauddin Khan, used to stay in Atul Mama's house at that time. I heard him play the piano occasionally. One day, the well-known singer of those times, Sri Krishan Ratanjankar, visited us and sang his famous song, Bhavani dayani, set in Bharavi. Atul Mama wrote a new song, Shuno, shey dakey aamarey (Listen, he's calling out to me), based on Bhavani dayani.

Mira Choudhury

Siddhartha Ghosh in his book ছবি তোলা: বাঙালির ফোটোগ্রাফি-চর্চা (Taking Pictures: The Practice of Photography by Bengalis) published an interview with Mira Choudhury, a noted photographer of early twentieth century. Meera was born in 1905 and all through her childhood she met her father's (Dwijendralal Maitra, a well-known doctor) famous friends: the composer Atulprasad Sen, Sukumar Ray, and many others who visited the family at their quarters at Mayo Hospital, where her father was employed.

Bimal Mukherjee

Bimal Mukherjee was only 23 years of age when he started touring the world in 1926 in his bi-cycle. He returned in 1937 and published his memoir দু'চাকায় দুনিয়া (Duchakay Duniya), where he mentioned that in 1928 he met Atul Prasad in England:

I met the famous poet, musician and barrister Atul Prasad Sen. He asked me whether I can sing. He was sorry to hear that I can not. I frequented his house occasionally with my friend Ranjit Kumar Sen (Tulu), and enjoyed his songs. His great character fascinated me. He was amiable, intelligent and having good taste. He used to sing Thumri with all his emotions... In one such visit I heard Dilip Kumar Roy also singing along with Atul Prasad in his Cromwell Road house.

== Death ==
Atul Prasad died at Lucknow on 26 August 1934 at an age of sixty three years. He was buried at the Brahmo Temple of Kaoradi (কাওরাদি ব্রহ্ম মন্দির), Sripur subdivision of Gazipur District, Dhaka division, established by Sir Krishna Govinda Gupta in his estate in 1893.

Considering his failing health, on 3 May 1930, much before his demise, Atul Prasad signed off his will, which was revealed after his death. Apart from monthly stipends for his wife and son, he provided financial assistance to Hemanta Seva Sadan of Ramakrishna Sevashram, Sadharan Bahmo Samaj of Kolkata, Nabo Bidhan Brahmo Samaj of Dhaka, Panchapalli Gururam High School of Faridpur, Lucknow Bengali Club and Young Men's Association, Lucknow Bengali Girls' School, Muslim Orphanage in Mumtaj Park of Lucknow, Several orphanages of Hindu and Arya Samaj and various other charity organisations. All the property he dedicated towards charity included his residence at Charbag, Lucknow; all land property; all furnitures and collection of books, motor car, cash certificates; shares; life insurance and all royalty from his creations and compositions.

Rabindranath Tagore wrote a poem on 4 September 1934 in memory of Atul Prasad. The poem was included in Geetigunja, in its 1957 edition.

== Legacy ==
- The Lal Bahadur Shastri National Academy of Administration, Mussoorie, (LBSNAA) adopted the song "হও ধরমেতে ধীর হও করমেতে বীর, হও উন্নত শির নাহি ভয়" (Hao Dharmete Dheer, Hao Karomete Bir, Hao Unnato Shir—Naahi Bhay) as the academy song of the institute.

== Bibliography ==
- Dasgupta, Binayendranath. (1971). Atul Prasad, memoirs of Atul Prasad Sen, Bagarth, Kolkata.
- Debi, Sahana. (Paush - 1336). কাকলি - অতুলপ্রসাদ (Kakoli) (the notation book of the songs written by Atulprasad Sen), Gurudas Chattopadhyay & Sons, *Calcutta.
- Ghosh, Nupurchhanda, অবিস্মরণীয় অতুলপ্রসাদ (Abismaraniya Atul Prasad), Bangiyo Sahitya Parishad, Kolkata.
- Ghosh, Sunilmoy. অতুলপ্রসাদ সমগ্র (Atul Prasad Samagra), Sahityam, Kolkata.
- Ghosh, Sunilmoy. অতুলপ্রসাদ সমগ্র (Atulprasad Samagra)
- Hom, Amal. অতুল স্মৃতিকথা (Atul Smritikatha)
- Majumder, Nila. (2016). আমিও একাকী তুমিও একাকী (Amio Ekaki Tumio Ekaki), Ananda Bazar Patrika, 23 January 2016.
- Mukhopadhyay, Manasi. (1931). Atul Prasad - A Biography, Signet Bookshop, Calcutta 12.
- Mukhopadhyay, Manasi. (1971). Atul Prasad, Paribeshak, Kolkata.
- Roy, Dilip Kumar. অতুলপ্রসাদ: মানুষ, কবি, ভক্ত (Atul Prasad - Manush, Kobi, Bhakta), Kolkata.
- Roy, Dilip Kumar. (1938). সাঙ্গিতিকী (Sangitiki), Calcutta University, Kolkata.
- Roy, Dilip Kumar. (Surela) Kolkata.
- Sanyal, Pahari, (2012). মানুষ অতুলপ্রসাদ (Manush Atul Prasad), Saptarshi Prakashan, Kolkata.
- Sen, Atul Prasad Sen. কয়েকটি গান (Kayekti Gan). Sadharon Brahmo Samaj, Calcutta.
- Sen, Atul Prasad. (1931). গীতিগুঞ্জ (Geetigunja), published by Jyotirindranath Das, Secretary, Sadharon Brahmo Samaj, 211, Cornwallis Street, Calcutta 6. 1931, Calcutta. (It was a collection of 193 songs created by Atulprasad Sen, and eight songs were included in a later edition after the death of the poet, published in 1957).
- Shome, Shovan, (2002). অতুলপ্রসাদ সেনের শ্রেষ্ঠ কবিতা (Atul Prasad Sener Shrestho Kabita), Bharbi, Kolkata.
