= Government Teachers' Training College, Comilla =

Teachers' Training College, Comilla

Coordinates: 23.4385°N 91.1358°E

Government Teachers' Training College, Comilla is a government college for training teachers in Kotbari, Comilla, Bangladesh.

== History ==
Government Teachers' Training College was established in 1962. Degrees offered include B.Ed. and M.Ed.

== See also ==
- List of universities in Bangladesh
- List of Islamic educational institutions
- Bangladesh Technical Education Board
- Education in Bangladesh
- Textile schools in Bangladesh
- List of colleges in Bangladesh
- List of medical colleges in Bangladesh
- List of dental schools in Bangladesh
- List of Educational Institutions in Comilla
- List of Teachers Training Colleges in Bangladesh
