= Chittaranjan Das =

Indian politician, poet, author and leader of the Bengali Swaraj Party (1870–1925)

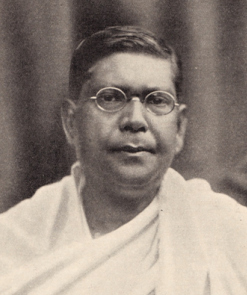
- Born: 5 November 1870; Calcutta, Bengal, British India
- Died: 16 June 1925 (aged 54); Darjeeling, Bengal, British India
- Other name: Deshbandhu
- Education: Middle Temple
- Occupations: Freedom fighter, politician, lawyer, educationist, author, poet
- Political party: Indian National Congress (Before 1923); Swaraj Party (1923–1925)
- Movement: Anushilan Samiti; Indian Independence movement
- Spouse: Basanti Devi
- Children: 3

Chittaranjan Das (5 November 1870 – 16 June 1925), popularly called Deshbandhu (friend of the country), was a Bengali freedom fighter, political activist and lawyer during the Indian Independence Movement and political guru of Subhas Chandra Bose. He was the founder-leader of the Swaraj Party in undivided Bengal during the period of British Colonial rule in India. His name is abbreviated as C. R. Das. He was closely associated with a number of literary societies and wrote poems, apart from numerous articles and essays.

== Early life ==
Chittaranjan Das was born on 5 November 1870 to a well-known Bengali Hindu Baidya family in Calcutta but his family originally form the village named Telirbagh, situated in present-day Tongibari Upazila of the Munshiganj (Bikrampur) district of Bangladesh.

== Family ==
Das family were members of Brahmo Samaj. Chittaranjan was the son of Bhuban Mohan Das, and nephew of the Brahmo social reformer Durga Mohan Das. His father was a solicitor and a journalist who edited the English church weekly, The Brahmo Public Opinion. Some of his cousins were Atul Prasad Sen, Satya Ranjan Das, Satish Ranjan Das, Sudhi Ranjan Das, Sarala Roy and Lady Abala Bose. His eldest grandson was Siddhartha Shankar Ray and his grand daughter is Justice Manjula Bose.

He married Basanti Devi (1880–1974) and had three children, Aparna Devi (1898–1972), Chiraranjan Das (1899–1928) and Kalyani Devi (1902–1983).

== Education ==
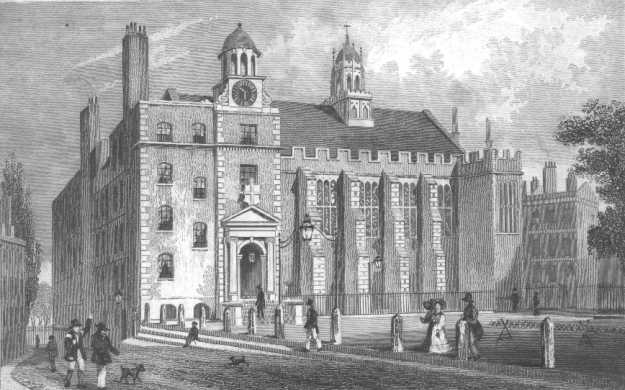
Middle Temple – A sketch by Thomas Shepherd; c.1830

The Das family of Durga Mohan was a family of lawyers. Durga Mohan's eldest son Satya Ranjan matriculated at Emmanuel College, Cambridge and was at Middle Temple during 1883–1886, followed by Chitta Ranjan Das, Durga Mohan's brother's son, during 1890–1894. Satish Ranjan Das (1891–1894), Jyotish Ranjan Das and Atul Prasad Sen (1892–1895) followed suit.

In London, Das befriended Sri Aurobindo Ghosh, Atul Prasad Sen, and Sarojini Naidu, among others, and together they promoted Dadabhai Naoroji in the British Parliament.He campaigned for Dadabhai Naoroji's election to the House of Commons in 1892, making speeches at several meetings including one presided by W.E. Gladstone(soon to be British Prime Minister for the fourth time).

== Career ==
=== Law career ===
Barrister Chittaranjan Das in 1909 while defending Sri Aurobindo in Alipore bomb case

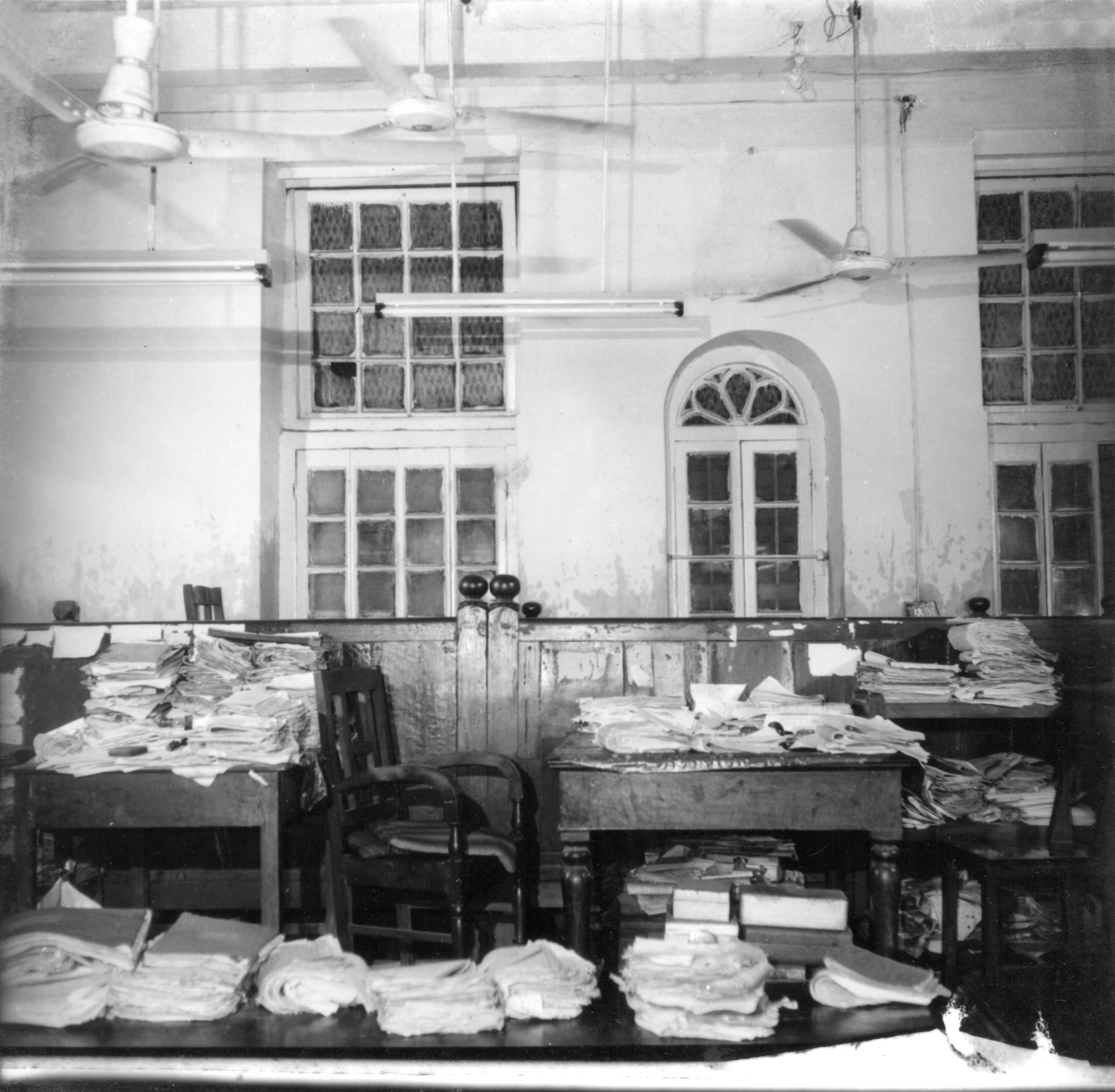
Alipore Bomb Case 1908–09 Trial Room at Alipore Sessions Court, Kolkata

Barrister C.R. Das gradually built a phenomenal legal career, overturning insolvency to become one of the wealthiest lawyers.

In 1894 Das gave up his law practice, and went into politics during the non-cooperation movement against the British colonial government. He again took up the brief, and successfully defended Aurobindo Ghosh on charges of involvement in the Alipore bomb case, in 1909. In his Uttarpara speech, Sri Aurobindo acknowledged that Das broke his health to save him.He also defended many other extremists including Bhupendra Nath Dutta and Brahma Bandhab Upadhyay, all without remuneration, sacrificing his own financial gains.

In the Alipore bomb case in 1908, Chittaranjan Das as defence counsel for Sri Aurobindo Ghosh, made this closing statement:

My appeal to you therefore is that a man like this who is being charged with the offences imputed to him stands not only before the bar in this Court but stands before the bar of the High Court of History and my appeal to you is this: That long after this controversy is hushed in silence, long after this turmoil, this agitation ceases, long after he is dead and gone, he will be looked upon as the poet of patriotism, as the prophet of nationalism and the lover of humanity. Long after he is dead and gone, his words will be echoed and re-echoed not only in India, but across distant seas and lands. Therefore I say that the man in his position is not only standing before the bar of this Court but before the bar of the High Court of History. The time has come for you, sir, to consider your judgment and for you, gentlemen, to consider your verdict.

=== Political career ===
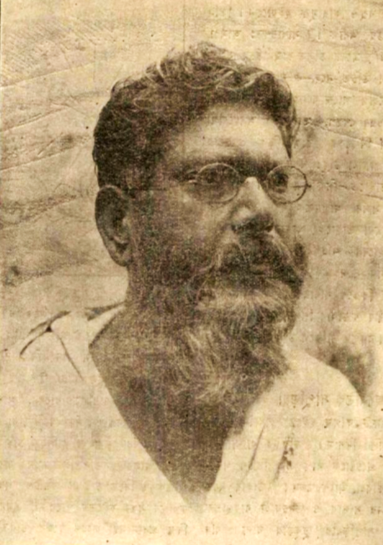
Chittaranjan Das after his release from prison in 1922.

Even as Das struggled to come to his own in the legal practice, Barindra Kumar Ghose, Aurobindo's brother and emissary to Bengal from 1901 for the purpose of setting up a radical and political network, established connection with him. In the same year he also collaborated with the extremist leader Bipin Chandra Pal in the publication of New India. Das's association with Ghose brothers continued, he became a patron of the Anushilan Samiti, and was one of the three financiers of Bande Mataram, the newspaper published by Aurobindo and Pal.

- Chittaranjan Das was actively involved in the activities of Anushilan Samiti. When Pramatha Mitter organised the Samiti as its president to produce hundreds of young firebrands who were ready to sacrifice their lives for the cause of the Nation, Chittaranjan became his associate. Anushilan Samiti was maintained by P. Mitter with the assistance of Chittaranjan Das (1894), Haridas Bose (1895), Suren Haldar (1900) and Manabendra Nath Roy (1901).He was involved with Suren Banerjee's Student Association during his student days at the Presidency College in the late 1880s.

He supported the Swadeshi movement, raised funds for the National Council of Education, and attended the Bengal Provincial Conference of 1906 at Barisal, drafting the main resolution of the conference.In 1906, when Tilak organised Shivaji festival, he along with other Maharashtrian leaders stayed at Das's house. He was a leading figure in Bengal during the Non-Cooperation Movement of 1919–1922, and initiated the ban on British-made clothes, setting an example by burning his own European clothes and wearing Khadi clothes. He brought out a newspaper called Forward and later changed its name to Liberty as part of his support for various anti-British movements in India. When the Calcutta Municipal Corporation was formed, he became its first mayor.

He was a believer in non-violence and constitutional methods for the realisation of national independence, and advocated Hindu-Muslim unity, cooperation and communal harmony and championed the cause of national education. He resigned his presidency of the Indian National Congress at the Gaya session after losing a motion on "No Council Entry" to Gandhi's faction. He then founded the Congress-Khilafat Swaraj Party, with Narasimha Chintaman Kelkar and veteran Motilal Nehru. Other prominent leaders included Huseyn Shaheed Suhrawardy, Birendranath Sasmal, Jatindra Mohan Sengupta and Subhas Chandra Bose of Bengal, Vithalbhai Patel and other Congress leaders who were becoming dissatisfied with the Congress. In May 1923, at AICC meet in Bombay, Das was able to get majority support for his policy of council entry, with 96 members voting in favour, and 71 against.

=== Poet ===
Chittaranjan Das emerged as a distinguished Bengali poet, when, during the troubled days of National movement, he published the first two volumes of his collection of poems titled "Malancha" and "Mala". In 1913 he published "Sagar Sangeet" (The Songs of the Sea). Sri Aurobindo was in Pondichery and when he was in dire need of financial support. Chittaranjan offered him one thousand rupees as a token of his support for an English translation of the poem, a few verses of which are given below:

Songs of the Sea
I
O thou unhoped-for elusive wonder of the skies,
Stand still one moment! I will lead thee and bind
With music to the chambers of my mind.
Behold how calm today this sea before me lies
And quivering with what tremulous heart of dreams
In the pale glimmer of the faint moonbeams.
If thou at last art come indeed, O mystery, stay
Woven by song into my heart-beats from this day.

Stand, goddess, yet! Into this anthem of the seas
With the pure strain of my full voiceless heart
Some rhythm of the rhythmless, some part
Of thee I would weave today, with living harmonies
Peopling the solitude I am within.
Wilt thou not here abide on that vast scene,
Thou whose vague raiment edged with dream haunts us and flees,
Fulfilled in an eternal quiet like this sea’s?
II
I lean to thee a listening ear
And thy immense refrain I hear,
O Ocean circled with the lights of morn.
What word is it thou sing’st? what tune
My heart is filled with, and it soon
Must overflow? What mystical unborn
Spirit is singing in thy white foam-caves?
What voice turns heaven to music from thy waves?
III
Long gazing on this dawn and restless sea,
My heart is moved with a strange minstrelsy.
Tranquil and full and slow that music’s sound
Or a chant pitiful, tender and profound.
At times its passing fills my heart with tears.
Maddened it runs and maddening him who hears.
What spirit lives and laughs and weeps in thee?
What thought is here that cries eternally?
I know not, but a trembling sweet and strong
Has taken my every limb touched by thy song,
O infinite Voice, O Soul that callst to me,
As I look on this luminous dawn and on the sea!
...

Chittaranjan started a monthly journal named Narayana, and many eminent writers such as Sharat Chandra Chattopadhyay, Bipin Chandra Pal and Hariprasad Shastri contributed their writings in the journal.

== Death ==
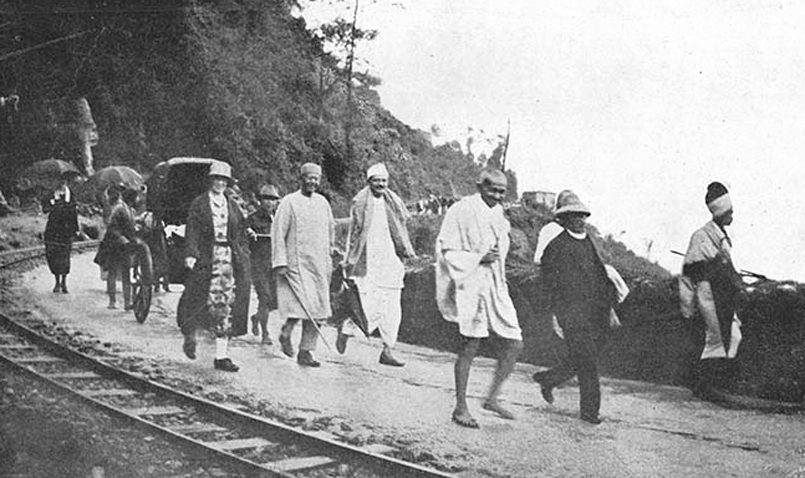
Chittaranjan Das with cane in hand, and Mahatma Gandhi on the Hill Cart Road near Kakjhora, Darjeeling in 1925

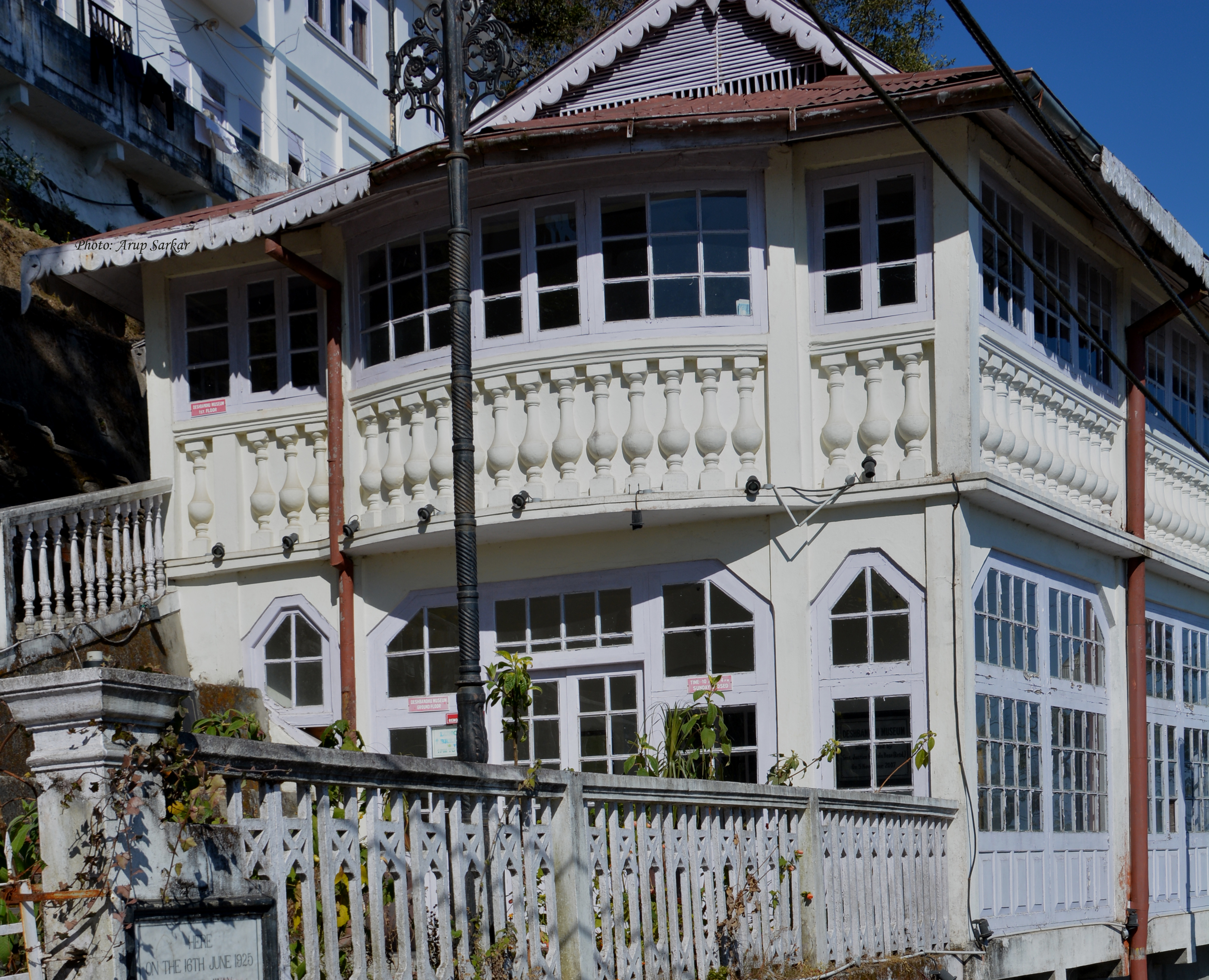
Residence of Chittaranjan Das in Darjeeling West Bengal

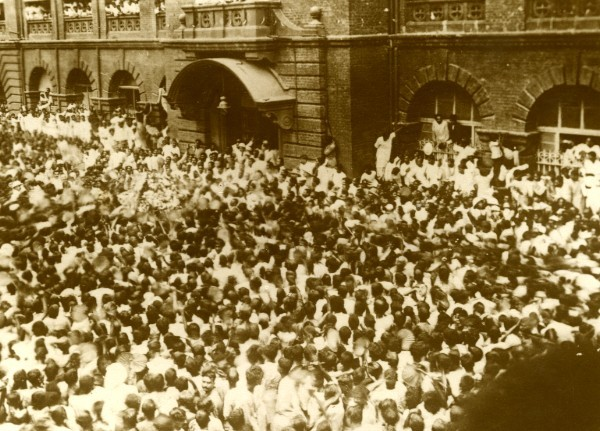
Chittaranjan's funeral procession in 1925

In May 1925, Chittaranjan's health was failing. He went to Darjeeling to recuperate, staying at Sir N. N. Sircar's house "Step Aside". Mahatma Gandhi visited him and stayed with him for some days. Gandhiji wrote,

When I left Darjeeling I left much more that I had ever thought before. There was no end of my affection for Deshbandhu and my warm feeling for such a great soul.

The funeral procession in Calcutta was led by Gandhi, who said:

Deshbandhu was one of the greatest of men... He dreamed... and talked of freedom of India and of nothing else... His heart knew no difference between Hindus and Muslims and I should like to tell Englishmen, too, that he bore no ill-will to them.

=== Memorials ===
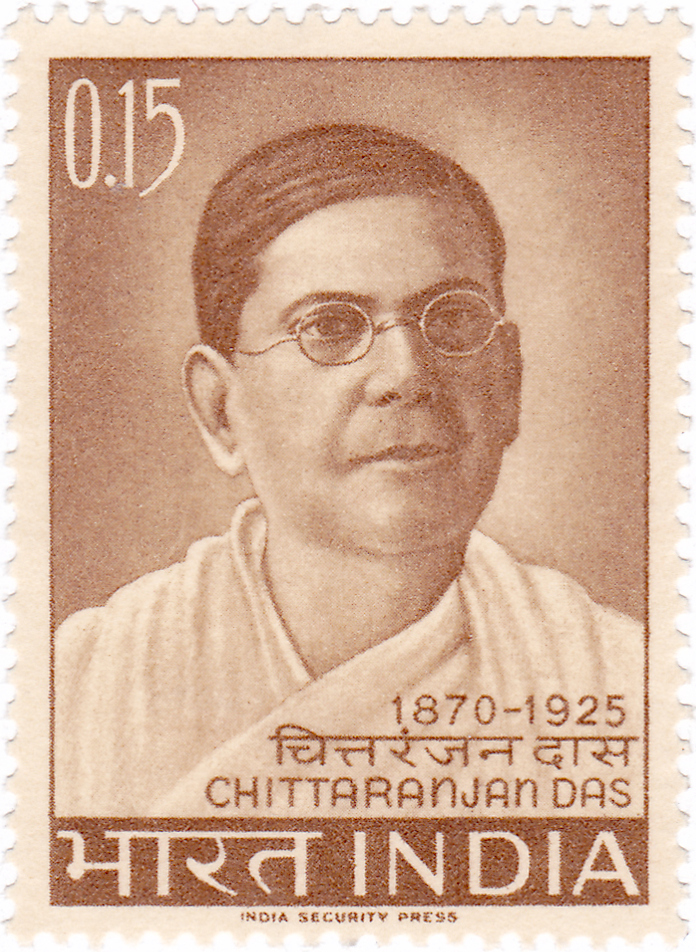
Das on a 1965 stamp of India

- Chittaranjan National Cancer Institute of Kolkata had its humble beginning in the year 1950 when the Chittaranjan Cancer Hospital was founded in the premises of Chittaranjan Seva Sadan. A few years before his death Chittaranjan gifted this property including his house and the adjoining lands to the nation to be used for the betterment of the lives of women.
- Chittaranjan Avenue, the main thoroughfare of Kolkata connecting North Kolkata with Central Kolkata, it was formerly known as Central Avenue.
- Chittaranjan, a town located in the Paschim Bardhaman district near Asansol. It is located at the border of Bengal and Jharkhand. It is famous for housing the legendary Chittaranjan Locomotive Works.
- Chittaranjan Locomotive Works, the largest locomotive manufacturing unit in the whole world.
- Chittaranjan College, a bachelor arts and science government college located in the historic College Street district of North Kolkata.
- Chittaranjan Park, home to large Bengali community, originally EPDP Colony in South Delhi was named after Deshbandhu Chittaranjan Das during 1980's
- Deshbandhu College for Girls, a women's college on Rashbehari Avenue in South Kolkata, established in 1955 and affiliated to University of Calcutta, is named honouring his legacy.
- The Evoor Deshabandhu Grandhashala & Vayanasala established in 1925 at Evoor, Alappuzha, Kerala is named after the prominent Indian freedom fighter.The library was founded in the exact year of his passing (1925) as a tribute to his monumental sacrifices and leadership in the Indian Independence Movement.
