= Raisina Bengali Senior Secondary School =

Information
- Established: 1925; 101 years ago
- Enrollment: c.2500
- Language: English

Raisina Bengali School (founded 1925) is a senior secondary school located at Mandir Marg (Central Delhi) New Delhi, India. It is an English medium school and follows CBSE curriculum. The school started functioning near Willingdon hospital, and later moved on to its present location in Mandir Marg, near Baird Lane, New Delhi. A sister branch of the school is in CR Park.

The present head of the school since 2022 is Sir Swadesh Mandal. The school offers education up to higher secondary level and has over 2500 students, who come from all parts of Delhi. The primary medium of instruction is English. A feature of the school is its focus on Bengali language and culture. Bengali language classes are compulsory up to VIII standard. Afterwards, the students can take Hindi, Bengali, or Sanskrit as an additional language from IX Standard. At the senior secondary level, the students can select between Arts, Science and Commerce stream.

The primary block building was constructed in the mid-1960s, in the 1970s the "Dr. Meghnad Saha" science block was constructed. Later a stage, an audio-visual room and indoor sports facilities were added. The school also acquired a nice playing ground, on which football, cricket and volleyball can be played. The school's main building has been declared to be a heritage site by the Delhi Government.

Many footballers from the school have represented Delhi University colours in the 1960s and 1970s. Noted Academic Shri A K Chakravartty (Principal of the school1946-1970) was awarded the National teachers award in 1970.

At present there are two registered alumni associations of the school, "Raisina Bengali School Alumni Association" and "Ex-Raisinian's Welfare Association".

== See also ==
List of educational institutions in Delhi
