= Abala Bose =

Indian educationalist (1865–1951)

Lady Abala Bose
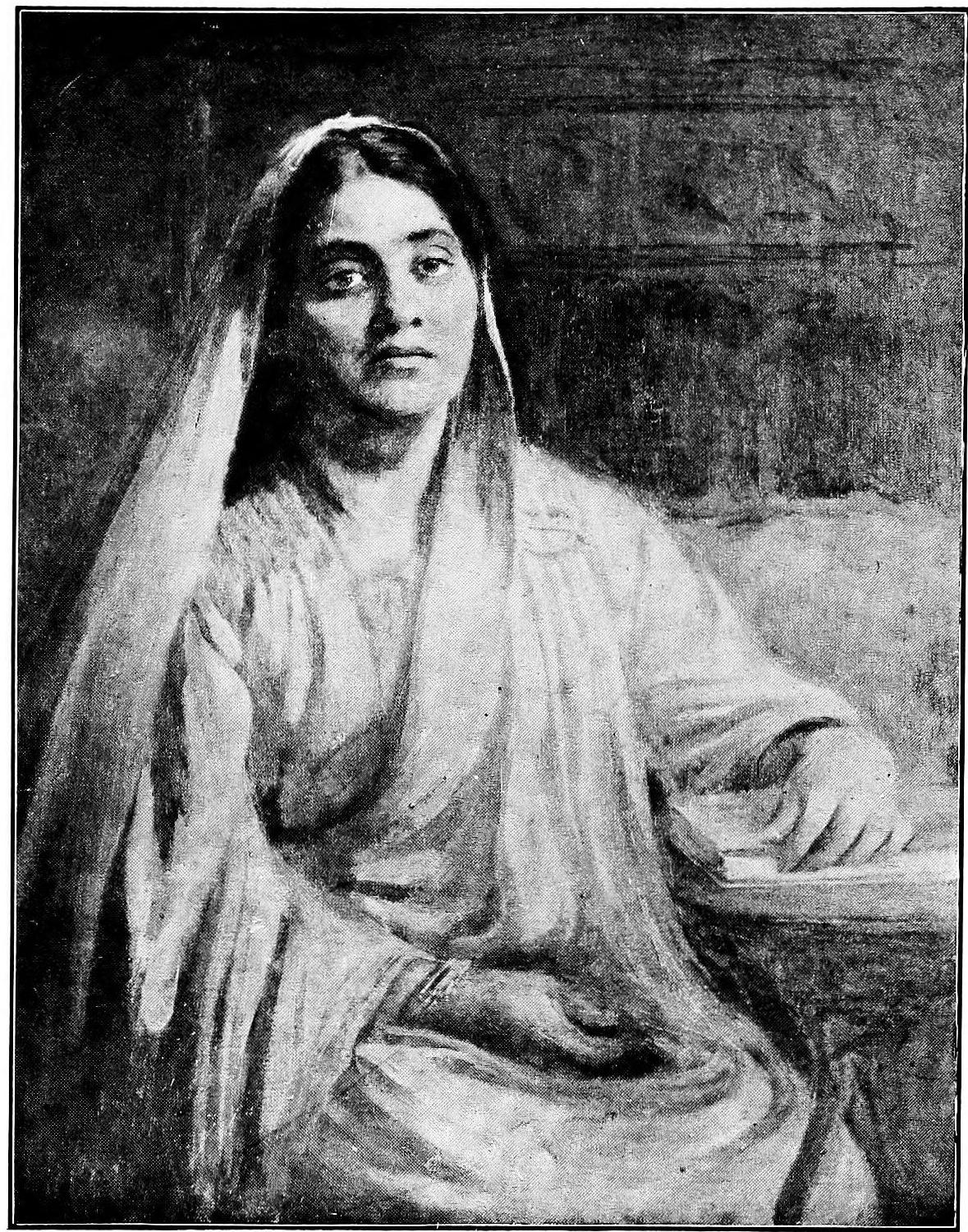
- Born: Abala Das; 8 August 1864; Barisal, Bengal Presidency, British India
- Died: 26 April 1951 (aged 86); Calcutta, West Bengal, India
- Occupation: Social worker
- Known for: Feminist movement
- Spouse: Jagadish Chandra Bose (m. 1887)
- Parents: Durga Mohan Das (father); Brahmamoyee Devi (mother)

Abala Bose (née Das; 8 August 1864 – 26 April 1951) was an Indian social worker and feminist. She was known for her efforts in women's education and her contribution towards helping widows.

== Early life and education ==
Abala Das was a daughter of Brahmo reformer Durga Mohan Das and Brahmamoyee Devi. Her first cousin was independence leader Chittaranjan Das.

Das was a student of the Brahma Balika Vidyalay in Calcutta and subsequently enrolled at Bethune School, from where she passed the Entrance Examination in 1881.

In the 1880s, Das was denied admission to Calcutta Medical College as female students were not yet accepted in the college. She went to Madras (now Chennai) in 1882 on a Bengal government scholarship to study medicine but had to give up because of ill health. However, the Madras Medical College awarded her with a Certificate of Honour.

In 1887, Das married scientist Jagadish Chandra Bose and became Lady Bose following his knighthood in 1916. She accompanied her husband on several travels abroad in later years.

== Work ==
Apart from working as an educator, Bose was an early feminist. Writing in the English magazine Modern Review, she argued that women should get a better education, "not because we may make better matches for our girls ... not even that the services of the daughter-in-law may be more valuable in the home of her adoption, but because a woman like a man is first of all a mind, and only in the second place physical and a body."

Bose founded the Vidyasagar Bani Bhawan Primary Teachers’ Training Institute in 1925, which, according to its website, provides "vocational training to distressed women and widows so that they may earn their living in honorable means and get established as respected citizens of the society."

Bose also established a widow's home in Calcutta, as well as the Nari Siksha Samity.

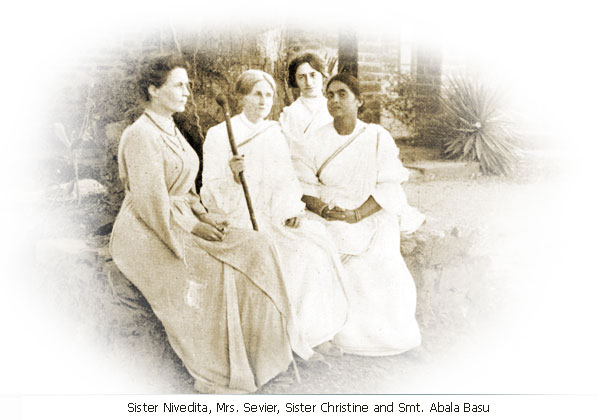
Sister Nivedita, Sister Christine, Charlotte Sevier, and Lady Abala Bose in Mayavati

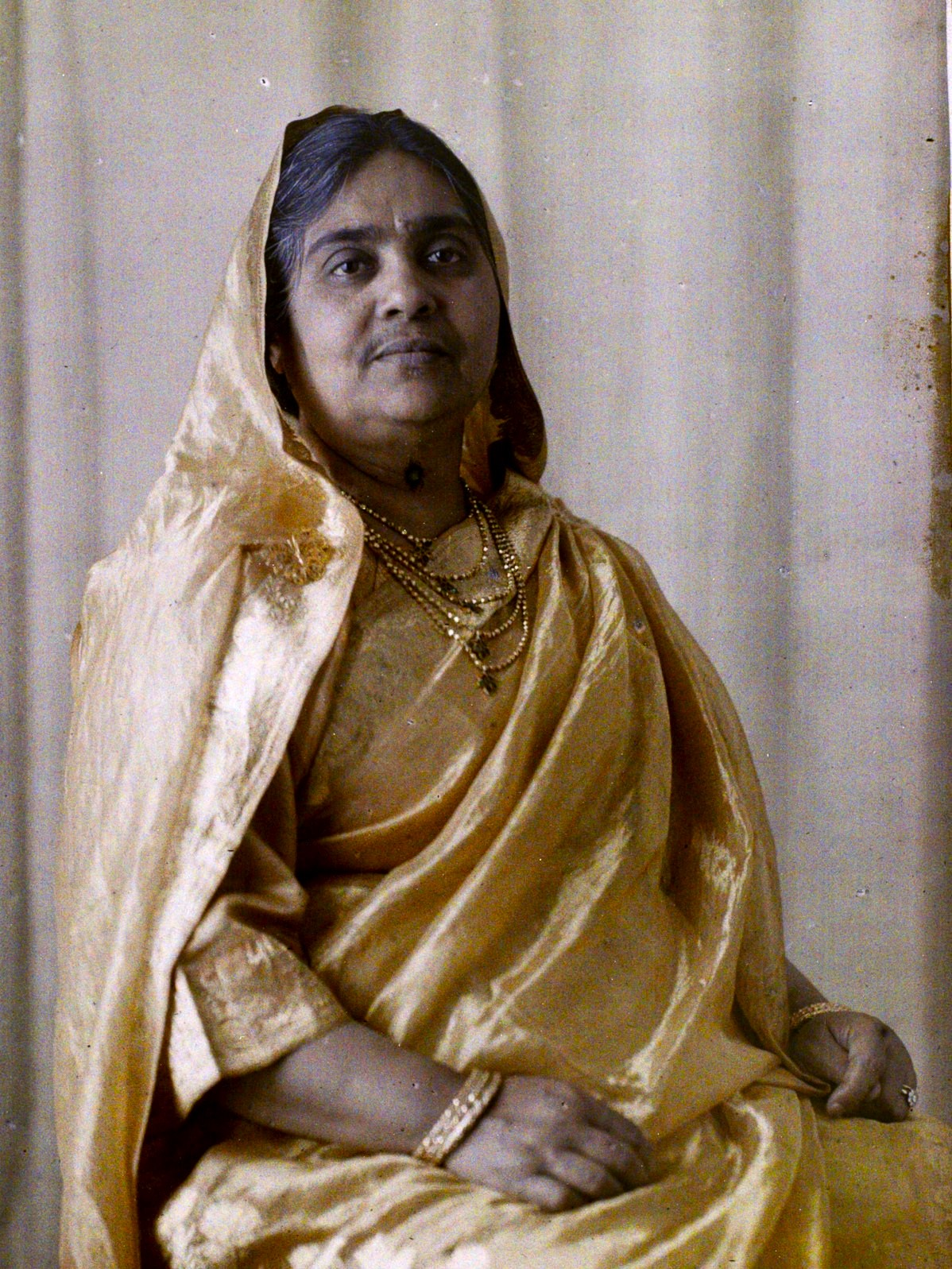
Autochrome portrait by Georges Chevalier, 1920

Bose served as secretary of Brahmo Balika Shikshalaya from 1910 to 1936.

Bose wrote travelogues: England Bhraman (Travel to England, three parts, 1897–98); Italy Bhraman (Travel to Italy, 1901); Americar Balakbalikader Katha (About the Children of America, 1908) and Japan Bhraman (Travel to Japan, 1915). In 1932, Prabasi magazine published Bangali Mahilar Prithibi Bhraman (A Bengali Woman’s Travel around the World), her European travel narrative.

Bose died on 26 April 1951, aged 86.
