= Durga Mohan Das =

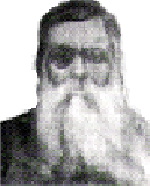
- দুর্গামোহন দাশ
- Born: 1841; Bikrampur, Bengal Presidency
- Died: 1897 (aged 55–56); Ranchi, Bengal Presidency
- Known for: Brahmo Samaj leader, social reformer
- Spouse: Brahmamoyee Devi

Durga Mohan Das (Bengali: দুর্গামোহন দাশ Durga Mohon Das; 1841–1897) was a Brahmo Samaj leader and a social reformer.

== Biography ==
Durga Mohan was born in a well-known Baidya family at Telirbagh, Bikrampur, Dhaka in Bengal, now part of Munshiganj District of Bangladesh. Bikrampur has a long historical and cultural trail since many centuries. In the 12th century it was the capital of Ballal Sena and Lakshmana Sena, Kings of Sena dynasty and since then considered as an important seat of learning and culture of Eastern India.

Durga Mohan's father Kashiswar was a government pleader in the court of Barishal, presently in Bangladesh. Kashiswar had three sons, Kali Mohan, Durga Mohan and Bhuban Mohan, and all of them became practicing lawyers at Calcutta High Court. Bhuban Mohan was father of Chittaranjan Das.

In 1870, Durga Mohan Das shifted his law practice to Calcutta.

A social reformer, he was one of the members of the Brahmo Samaj who split off to found the Sadharan Brahmo Samaj.

Das died in December 1897.
