= Pal (surname) =

Indian and Bangladeshi surname

Origin
- Origin: Bengali Hindu
- Region of origin: Bengal

Pal, alternatively spelt Paul, is a common surname found in India and Bangladesh. It is traditionally believed that 'Pal' originated from the Sanskrit pala meaning protector, keeper, guard or herdsman. The surname is also occasionally found in other countries.

== History ==
The surname Pal (or Paul) is found in Bengal among Bengali Kayasthas. Historian Tej Ram Sharma mentions that the surname is "now confined to Kayasthas of Bengal" while referring to the names of Brahmins ending in such Kayastha surnames in the early inscriptions dating back to the Gupta period.

Pal is very frequently used as a surname by the Bengali Hindu potters (Kumbhakars), and other castes like Teli, Tili, Malakar (garland makers), Shankhari (conch shell sellers), Barujibi, Subarnabanik and Sadgop.

The saint Gwalipa told Suraj Sen, the ruler of Gwalior, to adopt the surname Pal, which remains prevalent up to eighty-three descendants of Suraj Sen.

The Ahirs in Central India use Pal as a surname.

One Gopāla founded Pala dynasty in Bengal and Bihar in 8th Century. In imitation of Pal dynasty of Assam, the Chutia (pronounced as Sutia) also took the surname of Pal.

Pal was also a popular surname among the Parmar Rajput rulers of the Garhwal.

Pal is a surname of the Thakuri people of Nepal.

Among Sikhs, Pal is often used as suffix to the given name or a middle name.

The rulers of Kullu held the surname Pal up to about the 15th century A.D., which they later changed to Singh.

The Gadaria people uses Pal as a surname.

== Indian notables ==
=== Business ===
- Bipradas Pal Chowdhury, Bengali industrialist
- Karan Paul, Chairman of Apeejay Surrendra Group
- Priya Paul, Indian businesswoman and Padmashree awardee (sister of Karan Paul)
- Supriya Paul, Indian entrepreneur, co-founder and CEO of Josh Talks

=== Entertainment ===
- Aditi Paul, Indian playback singer
- Amala Paul (born 1991), Indian film actress in Tamil and Malayalam cinema
- Amar Pal, Indian Bengali folk singer and author
- Amit Paul, Indian playback singer
- Amit Sebastian Paul, Indian-Swedish singer and businessman
- Anindita Paul, Indian singer
- Anuradha Pal, musical composer, known as the Lady Zakir Hussain
- Arpita Pal, Bengali actress and entrepreneur
- Beena Paul (born 1961), Indian film editor in Malayalam
- Colin Pal (1923-2005), actor and director (grandson of Bipin Chandra Pal)
- Imran Pal(Imran Khan), Bollywood actor
- Jai Paul, Indian-British recording artist
- Jeetu Kamal, Indian television and film actor
- Manish Paul, Indian actor, comedian and TV host
- Niranjan Pal (1889-1959), screenwriter and director (son of Bipin Chandra Pal)
- Patralekha Paul, Indian actress
- Rajeev Paul, Indian actor
- Satya Paul, Indian fashion designer
- Sohini Paul, Bengali actress, daughter of Tapas Paul
- Sunil Pal, Indian actor and comedian
- Tapas Paul, Indian Bengali actor and politician

=== Judiciary ===
- Debi Prasad Pal (born 1927), Indian lawyer, judge and cabinet minister
- Radhabinod Pal (1886-1967), judge, freedom fighter and Padma Vibhushan Awardee
- Ruma Pal (born 1941), Indian Supreme Court judge
- Samaraditya Pal, barrister

=== Politics ===
- Bipin Chandra Pal (1858–1932), Indian freedom fighter, journalist and writer
- Ila Pal Choudhury, Indian politician and social activist
- Jagdambika Pal (born 1960), former chief minister of Uttar Pradesh
- Jitendra Chandra Paul, Indian freedom fighter, journalist and author
- Kristo Das Pal (1839–1884), politician, journalist, orator and editor
- Rupchand Pal (born 1936), politician
- Saju Paul (born 1966), Indian Politician
- Shriram Pal (born 1960), Indian politician

=== Science ===
- Aloke Paul, materials scientist
- Anadish Pal (born 1963), inventor and poet
- Palash Baran Pal, Indian physicist and author
- Mahendra Pal, Indian scientist
- Sankar K. Pal, scientist and researcher, Director of the ISI-Calcutta, Padmashree Awardee
- Sourav Pal, scientist and researcher, Director of National Chemical Laboratory, Pune, Pioneering figure of Quantum Chemistry in India
- Vinod Kumar Paul, Indian pediatrician and medical scientist

=== Sports ===
- Avilash Paul, Indian footballer
- Bachendri Pal, first Indian woman to climb Mount Everest
- Gostha Pal (1896–1976), footballer
- Preethi Pal (born 2001), Indian para athlete
- Rajinder Pal, cricketer
- Shib Sankar Paul, Indian cricketer
- Subrata Pal, footballer

=== Others ===
- Gogi Saroj Pal, artist
- Krishna Pal (1762–1822), early Indian convert to Christianity
- Rakesh Pal, flag officer of the Indian Coast Guard

=== Fictional characters ===
- Haridas Pal, fictional Bengali character
