= Osian's Connoisseurs of Art =

Arts fund started in Mumbai (2010)

Osian's Connoisseurs of Art was founded by Neville Tuli in the year 2000.

== Auction House ==
Osian's Connoisseurs of Art began to hold regular fine art auctions since 2000. Osian's has held over 40 Auctions during the past two decades.The organization widened the scope of India's contemporary arts' secondary market. Osian's auctions gave a market to artists such as Nikhil Biswas, Chittaprosad, Rameshwar Broota, H A Gade, Bijon Choudhury, Biren De, Chittrovanu Mazumdar, K C S Paniker, J Sultan Ali, Shanti Dave, Rabin Mondal, and Prokash Karmakar among many other artists.

In 2002, a sensational new market and awareness for the popular arts, especially film memorabilia was created when it was placed on the same platform as Indian contemporary arts with the auction – A Historical Mela: The ABC of India.

In 2013, Osian's organized an auction of sports memorabilia, of Indian cricket memorabilia in Mumbai, which successfully sold 73 out of 100 lots for rupees 36 lakhs.

It also began an "International quality Auctions and Art Advisory Services" for the authentication, certification and valuation for Indian Contemporary Art along with an Art Index.

== Archival Exhibitions ==
In August 2002, Osian's organized an exhibited-auction titled 'A Historical Epic: India in the Making will document the freedom struggle from 1757 to 1950 - Surrender to Revolt, Swaraj to Responsibility' that consisted of Rare Books, Photographs, Popular Calendar Art, Oleographs, Engravings, Show Cards of Indian Cinema Etchings and Lithographs, Song-Synopsis Booklets, Vintage Posters, Lobby Cards, Indian modern and contemporary art. Neville Tuli described this exhibition as an "ongoing process of restructuring the manner by which the fine arts and its aesthetics, history and finance mesh to build a new and sustainable infrastructure for placing the arts in the developmental framework of India." The exhibition uniquely presented the film posters on an equal platform as fine arts - ascribing value to an otherwise torn, defaced or forgotten film poster.

In 2014, he organized an exhibition and auction of artworks of Indian & Asian arts, antiquities, books, prints, photographs and film memorabilia, which had been inspired by animals.

== Osian's Cinemaya ==
Cinemaya - a New Delhi-based film magazine founded by Aruna Vasudev in 1988 dedicated to Asian cinema was purchased by Osian's Connoisseurs of Art in 2004 and was retitled as Osian's Cinemaya. Vasudev continued to edit the magazine after the purchase. Cinemaya was the world's first journal exclusively dedicated to Asian Cinema to broaden its cinema-infrastructure base and to complement its vast cinema archives.

== Osian's Cinefan ==
The Cinemaya deal also included the Cinefan festival - renamed Osian's Cinefan, which was in its 5th year at the time; similar to the arrangement at the magazine, Vasudev continued as the festival director.

== Osian's Art Fund ==
Osian's art fund was India's first arts based fund. Launched in 2006 and sponsored by Osian's, "The Osian's Art Fund Scheme Contemporary-1" followed a subscription model from private investors that allowed investments in fine artworks from the Indian sub-continent. Neville Tuli as Chief Advisor to the Art Fund. No response from SEBI was received when SEBI was approached to seek guidance on registrations and regulations for the art fund.

"Osian's Art Fund – Scheme Contemporary 1", a three-year scheme which matured in July 2009 and had 656 unit holders. The company in turn purchased art by Indian artists including MF Husain and FN Souza, but was only able to sell them at a loss, thus leaving its investors with their initial investments eroded.

As per an investigation conducted by SEBI, the scheme had thus collected 102.4 crore rupees. A fund management fee of 3% was charged for purchasing units of Rs. 100 each, with an agreement to share the profits of sales with customers on a 30:70 basis and a promised hurdle rate of 15 percent.

Following complaints of non payment, the SAT (Securities Appellate Tribunal) ordered an investigation into the schemes floated by Osian. After hearing the case for over five years, it finally decided in April 2013 that the schemes floated by Osian were illegal 'Collective Investment Schemes', all carried out under the umbrella of "Osian's Connoisseurs", a sponsor and asset management company for Osian Art Fund. Thus they came under the gambit of SEBI and needed to be both registered as well as needed to comply with SEBI guidelines.

Connosiers of Art pvt. ltd., the holding company of Osian's art fund was finally ordered to be closed in 2013 by the Securities and exchange board of India. Most of its customers did not receive their principal back. Its outstandings were to the tune of Rs. 40 crores in 2014. No charges were levied against the founder Tuli who continues to operate Osian from New Delhi under a revised banner. In 2014, Tuli appealed to a tribunal to allow Osian to continue, while he tried to pay back at least some of its customers. In April 2017, the art fund was formally closed down, though Osian continues to work in other fields including wildlife.

Meanwhile, Abraaj Capital, a Dubai-based investment company filed a suit in London's commercial court against Osian to recover the $23.7 million it gave Bregawn Jersey, one of Tuli's many offshore companies, to seed an international venture called the India Asia Arab Art Fund. Osian's most ambitious project, Osianama, an art conservatory and pop culture museum, is yet to rise from the land in Central Mumbai where the famed Minerva theatre once stood.

As per Forbes, the list of people who invested in Osian's art fund included Sanjeev Khandelwal (Khandelwal Laboratories), industrialist Gautam Thapar, Pramit Jhaveri (Citibank), Sheshasayee Properties (Kumar Mangalam Birla), Priya Paul (Apeejay Surendra Group), HCL Corporation Ltd., Roshni Nadar, Ashok Alexander (Gates Foundation), celebrity cook Tarla Dalal, Jaithirth (Jerry) Rao (the founder of MphasiS), Kamal Morarka (Gannon Dunkerly) and Sangita Kathiwada.

== Durand Cup ==
Osian became the title sponsor for Durand Cup in 2007 and signed a 5-year contract to co-host the cup and revive the interest in the game
