= Neville Tuli =

British writer

- Born: 24 April 1964 (age 62)
- Education: London School of Economics, London
- Occupations: Founder Chairman, Osian's Group
- Writing career
- Subjects: Indian Art, Art History
- Notable work: The Flamed Mosaic: Indian Contemporary Painting

Neville Tuli (born 24 April 1964, England UK) is a pioneering author, curator and archivist, active in the field of Arts and Cultural Heritage in India. He studied at the London School of Economics and St. Catherine's College University of Oxford. He lived in England until he returned to India in 1993.

== Published work and critical reception ==
=== The Flamed Mosaic: Indian Contemporary Painting ===
In 1997 he wrote a book The Flamed Mosaic: Indian Contemporary Painting, on the aesthetics and history of Indian Modern & Contemporary Painting in April 1997.

The Flamed Mosaic: Indian Contemporary Painting

Shivaji Pannikar in his book 'Towards a New Art History: studies in Indian art' referred to The Flamed Mosaic as the first comprehensive book written on Indian painting.

Ratan Parimoo's review of the book in Asia Art Archive referred to the book as 'substantial' and 'topical'. Parimoo wrote, "This book therefore is part of the international recognition and significance of contemporary Indian Art, in the lavish format in which it has been produced."

Martin Kämpchen in his review published in Frankfurter Allgemeine Zeitung said "One must be grateful for the compilation of the historical factual material, especially for the biographical outlines and the extensive bibliography on Indian painting. Tuli also introduces the majority of the painters through interviews; their works are illuminated by excerpts from essays and monographs."

Chitra Sardesai at Mid Day commented in relation to The Flamed Mosaic and The Intuitive-Logic exhibition,"The panorama of contemporary Indian art as seen through these shows is the first of its kind and does much credit to the curator, Neville Tuli. It will be permanently remembered through the definitive book he has authored".

Neville on the purpose of the book remarked, "It (a book) ought to have an energy all of its own. That energy has not been channelised in great depth in our country...in taking forward the new mind especially in the arts."

=== Other Writings and Interviews ===
In the Hindu dated 1999, Neville Tuli was interviewed by contemporary Indian artist Dr Gieve Patel and historian, Professor Shadakshari Settar. The interviews were published as a series of 4 articles and laid out the need for creating infrastructure for art in India.

== Career ==
=== Tuli Research Centre for India Studies (TRIS) ===
Tuli founded TRIS in 2023 with the goal of sharing his knowledge base, archives and library in disciplines such as arts, cinema and more. TRIS organized its inaugural exhibition in March 2024, 'Self-Discovery via Rediscovering India' at the India International Centre Gallery (New Delhi) that showcased selected artifacts, digitized artworks, archives and memorabilia from the research center.

TRIS has a repository of archival material and books, rare and contemporary, which reflect Tuli's vision for a place of learning and discovery that is not influenced by external political or economic forces. Tuli's travel across India led him to meticulously photograph both celebrated landmarks as well as forgotten monuments. These photographic documents are now one of the cornerstones of TRIS. The collection housed by TRIS includes modern and contemporary fine and popular arts and crafts, architectural heritage, Indian and world cinema, photography, ecological studies, animal welfare, and the social sciences.

The Sunday Guardian referred to TRIS as more than just an academic institution and described TRIS as a testament to Neville Tuli’s lifelong dedication to preserving and promoting India’s cultural heritage. The Sunday Guardian reported, "The Centre’s primary focus is to illuminate the connections between India’s past and present, offering valuable perspectives on its complex identity through rigorous preservation and scholarly exploration."

=== Osianama ===
In 2013 Tuli and Osian's launched a website called osianama.com, containing information on Indian art along with a special search engine meant for Indian art.

=== Osian's Connoisseurs of Art ===
Neville Tuli established Osian's Connoisseurs of Art (commonly referred as Osian's) in the year 2000. From 2000 to 2019, Neville Tuli has curated over 40 Auctions. Through the art auctions and exhibitions, he widened the scope of India's contemporary arts' secondary market. In the process, the auctions introduced many Indian artists. Further awareness for the popular arts, especially film memorabilia was created when it was placed on the same platform as Indian contemporary arts, Film and Popular Culture Auctions Auctions of sports memorabilia further extended its aim of preserving cultural heritage and history. The exhibitions facilitated a new and sustainable infrastructure for placing the arts in the developmental framework of India. Osian acquired the journal Cinemaya and the Cinefan festival in 2004 where Aruna Vasudev continued to be the festival director.

Osian's Art Fund was launched in 2006, with Neville Tuli as Chief Advisor and Osian's as sponsor. The fund mobilised the investments collected INR 102.4 crores from 656 investors. In 2008, the SEBI commenced litigation against Osian's due to its not having filed any papers for the art fund. However, before the scheme was launched Osian had a meeting with SEBI regarding a formal registration, but no response was received from SEBI on what kind of registrations or regulations would be required. As per a 2015 SAT order, it was stated "..it is evident that even after issuing show cause notice in the year 2007, SEBI did not adjudicate the same, because even according to SEBI the scheme was not covered under CIS." Further information at Osian's Connoisseurs of Art.

=== The Tuli Foundation for Holistic Education & Art (HEART) ===
In 1996, Tuli established a trust called "HEART" (The Tuli Foundation for Holistic Education & Art) Its stated aim was "to help build a quality-conscious infrastructure for the Indian fine arts".

HEART started with a curated exhibition titled "The Intuitive Logic: A Festival of Indian Contemporary Painting". The exhibition evolved into a series of non-commercial exhibitions in New Delhi and Mumbai in collaboration with The British Council, Max Mueller Bhavan (now knowns as Goethe Institut), Cymroza Art Gallery, Gallery Chemould, Pundole Gallery and Prithvi Gallery. The Mid-Day reported the festival saying, "For art lovers, this will be manna."

"The Intuitive-logic II", the first curated auction, established record prices for many artists including Raja Ravi Varma whose painting - Begum's Bath, fetched Rs. 32 lacs, the highest price ever for a modern Indian painting then - also recorded in Limca book of records.

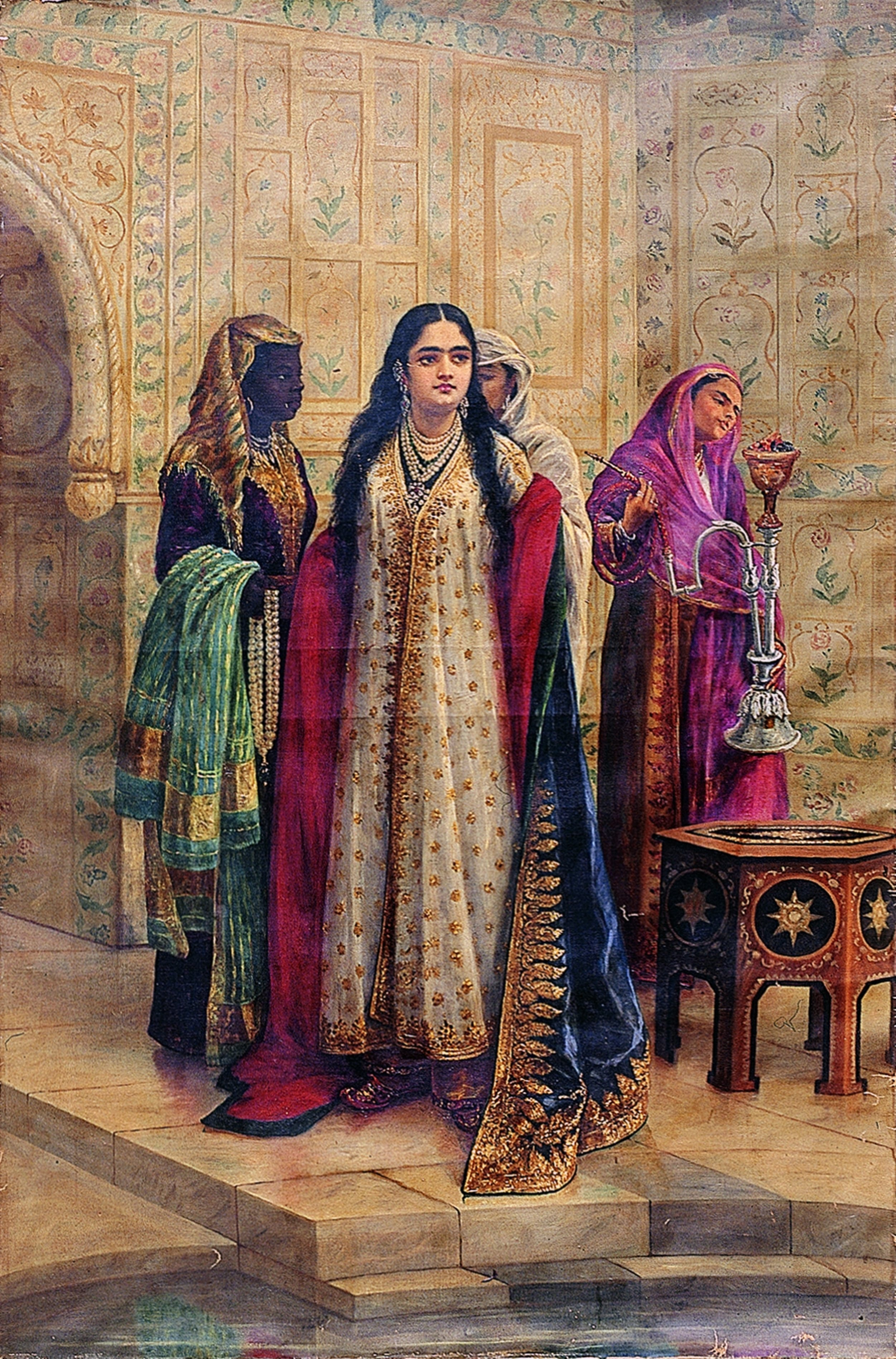
Raja Ravi Verma's Begum's Bath (Oil on Canvas)

== Books and Auction Catalogues ==
- 1997, The Flamed Mosaic: Indian Contemporary Painting, Tuli, Neville, HEART & Mapin Publishing Pvt. Ltd., ISBN 81-85822-45-X
- 1997, The Intuitive-Logic II: Modern & Contemporary Indian Paintings, Drawings, Graphics, Sculpture & Tapestry, HEART., ISBN 81-858225-06
- 1999, HEART: Intuitive Logic – The Next Step, HEART., ISBN 81-85822-68-9
- 2001, India: The Passionate Detachment, Osian's Connoisseurs of Art Pvt. Ltd., ISBN 81-901247-0-6
- 2001, India: Historical Lila, Mumbai, Osian's Connoisseurs of Art Pvt. Ltd., ISBN 978-1-890206-39-0
- 2002, A Historical Mela: The ABC of India The Art, Book & Cinema, Osian's Connoisseurs of Art Pvt. Ltd., ISBN 978-1-890206-49-9
- 2002, A Historical Epic: India in the Making 1757–1950 From Surrender to Revolt, Swaraj to Responsibility, Osian's Connoisseurs of Art Pvt. Ltd., ISBN 81-901247-4-9
- 2002, MMQ & Indian Modern & Contemporary Paintings, Osian's Connoisseurs of Art Pvt. Ltd., ISBN 978-1-890206-58-1
- 2003, Forty Masterpieces 20th Century Painting & Drawing From India, Pakistan, Bangladesh & Sri Lanka, Mumbai, sian's Connoisseurs of Art Pvt. Ltd., ISBN 978-1-890206-59-8
- 2003, FN-FN Figurative Non-Figurative Narration, Osian's Connoisseurs of Art Pvt. Ltd., ISBN 978-1-890206-63-5
- 2004, Masterpieces & Museum-Quality III Indian Contemporary Paintings with Rare Books & Vintage Cinema Memorabilia, Osian's Connoisseurs of Art Pvt. Ltd., ISBN 978-1-890206-70-3
- 2004, The Masterpieces & Museum Quality Series IV Indian Contemporary Art Paintings and Sculpture, Osian's Connoisseurs of Art Pvt. Ltd., ISBN 978-1-890206-76-5
- 2005, Indian Contemporary Art Painting, Drawing & Sculpture, Osian's Connoisseurs of Art Pvt. Ltd., ISBN 978-81-8174-003-8
- 2005, Film Memorabilia & The Fine-Popular Cultures of India, Osian's Connoisseurs of Art Pvt. Ltd., ISBN 978-81-8174-008-3
- 2005, Masterpieces & Museum Quality Series V: Indian Contemporary Paintings, Osian's Connoisseurs of Art Pvt. Ltd., ISBN 978-81-8174-011-3
- 2006, Masterpieces & Museum Quality Series VI, Osian's Connoisseurs of Art Pvt. Ltd., ISBN 978-81-8174-012-0
- 2006, The ABC Series Art, Book & Cinema, Osian's Connoisseurs of Art Pvt. Ltd., ISBN 978-81-8174-013-7
- 2006, Forty Masterpieces Museum Quality Series VII, Osian's Connoisseurs of Art Pvt. Ltd., ISBN 978-81-8174-015-1
- 2007, Museum Quality Series VIII, Osian's Connoisseurs of Art Pvt. Ltd., ISBN 978-81-8174-017-5
- 2007, ABC Series III Art, Book & Cinema, Osian's Connoisseurs of Art Pvt. Ltd., ISBN 978-81-8174-018-2
- 2007, The Masterpieces & ABC Series, Osian's Connoisseurs of Art Pvt. Ltd., ISBN 978-81-8174-019-9
- 2007, The Masters Series, Osian's Connoisseurs of Art Pvt. Ltd., ISBN 978-81-8174-021-2
- 2008, Indian Modern & Contemporary Art, Osian's Connoisseurs of Art Pvt. Ltd., ISBN 978-81-8174-022-9
- 2008, Indian Modern & Contemporary Art, Osian's Connoisseurs of Art Pvt. Ltd., ISBN 978-81-8174-023-6
- 2008, The ABC Series, Osian's Connoisseurs of Art Pvt. Ltd., ISBN 978-81-8174-024-3
- 2008, Indian Modern & Contemporary Art & Craft, Osian's Connoisseurs of Art Pvt. Ltd., ISBN 978-81-8174-026-7
- 2009, ABC Series Auction, Osian's Connoisseurs of Art Pvt. Ltd., ISBN 978-81-8174-028-1
- 2009, Indian Modern & Contemporary Art, Osian's Connoisseurs of Art Pvt. Ltd., ISBN 978-81-8174-029-8
- 2009, Indian Modern & Contemporary Art & Craft, Osian's Connoisseurs of Art Pvt. Ltd., ISBN 978-81-8174-030-4
- 2009, Select Masterpieces of Indian Modern & Contemporary Art, Osian's Connoisseurs of Art Pvt. Ltd., ISBN 978-81-8174-031-1
- 2009, Indian & Asian Antiquities & Modern Arts, Osian's Connoisseurs of Art Pvt. Ltd., ISBN 978-81-8174-032-8
- 2010, The Masterpieces Series, Osian's Connoisseurs of Art Pvt. Ltd., ISBN 978-81-8174-034-2
- 2010, 101 Rare Artworks from the History of Indian Modern & Contemporary Art, Osian's Connoisseurs of Art Pvt. Ltd., ISBN 978-81-8174-035-9
- 2011, Creative India Series 1: Bengal, Osian's Connoisseurs of Art Pvt. Ltd., ISBN 978-81-8174-037-3
- 2012, Creative India Series 2: Punjab & Delhi, Osian's Connoisseurs of Art Pvt. Ltd., ISBN 978-81-8174-038-0
- 2012, Creative India Series 3: Bombay & Baroda, Osian's Connoisseurs of Art Pvt. Ltd., ISBN 978-81-8174-039-7
- 2012, Creative India Series 4: Goa, Cholamandal & South India, Osian's Connoisseurs of Art Pvt. Ltd., ISBN 81-8174-044-0
- 2012, Osians -Cinefan Auction of Indian Film Memorabilia, Osian's Connoisseurs of Art Pvt. Ltd., ISBN 978-81-8174-045-8
- 2013, The Osianama Series: Antq. Arts. Cine. Photo. Prnt, Osian's Connoisseurs of Art Pvt. Ltd., ISBN 978-81-8174-046-5
- 2013, Forty Masterpieces Indian Miniatures & Modern Art, Osian's Connoisseurs of Art Pvt. Ltd., ISBN 978-81-8174-047-2
- 2013, Dare to Care: A Charity Fundraising Auction for UNICEF, Osian's Connoisseurs of Art Pvt. Ltd., ISBN 978-81-8174-048-9
- 2013, Osian's India's Glorious Cricketing Heritage, Osian's Connoisseurs of Art Pvt. Ltd., ISBN 978-81-8174-049-6
- 2014, Icons: 2nd Cricket Heritage Auction, Osian's Connoisseurs of Art Pvt. Ltd., ISBN 978-81-8174-052-6
- 2014, 2nd Osianama Series, Osian's Connoisseurs of Art Pvt. Ltd., ISBN 978-81-8174-053-3
- 2014, The Greatest Indian Show on Earth, Osian's Connoisseurs of Art Pvt. Ltd., ISBN 978-81-8174-054-0
- 2014, All Creatures Great & Small, Osian's Connoisseurs of Art Pvt. Ltd., ISBN 978-81-8174-055-7

== Exhibitions curated ==
- 1997, Intuitive Logic: A Festival of Indian Modern & Contemporary Painting, Mumbai.
- 2004, The Underlying Spirit, New Delhi.
- 2005, Revisualising India, New Delhi.
- 2006, The Osian Asian, New Delhi.
- 2006, World Cinema Exhibition
- 2007, An Historical Epic (exhibition in three parts), New Delhi.
- 2008, The Osian Asian II, New Delhi.
- 2009, Jashn Osianama
- 2011, Indian Contemporary Art: The Intuitive – Logic Revisited From the Osian's Collection at the World Economic Forum, Davos, Switzerland.
- 2014, Celebrating Raja Ravi Varma - The Relevance and Significance of A National Art Treasure
- 2024, Self-Discovery via Rediscovering India, New Delhi
- 2024, The World's Greatest Mela – Respecting India's Cinematic Heritage, New Delhi
