= Haridas =

Haridas or Haridasa may refer to:

- Haridasa, devotee (dasa) of the god Vishnu (Hari) in the Bhakti movement of Hinduism
- Haridas (1944 film), a 1944 Indian Tamil-language film
- Haridas (2013 film), a 2013 Indian art film

== People ==
- Haridas Kesaria (d. 1527), a warrior and poet from Mewar
- Haridas Bhattacharya (1891–1956), Indian philosopher, author and educationist
- Haridas Chaudhuri (1913–1975), Indian philosopher affiliated with Aurobindo
- Haridas Dutta (1890–1976), Indian revolutionary and freedom fighter
- Haridas Giri, Indian saint
- Haridas Mundhra, Calcutta-based industrialist and stock speculator
- Haridas Niranjani, an Indian saint poet believed to have lived in the 16th and 17th centuries
- Haridas Pal, fictional Indian character
- Haridas Shastri (1918–2013), Indian Gaudiya Vaisnava scholar and practitioner
- Haridas Siddhanta Bagish, Indian writer and translator
- Haridas Viharidas Desai (1840–1895), Diwan of Junagadh state from 1883
- Haridasa Thakur (1450s–?), prominent follower of Chaitanya Mahaprabhu, a convert from Islam
- Hiresh Haridas, Indo-Malaysian singer-songwriter
- K. K. Haridas (1965–2018), Indian director
- K. P. Haridas, Indian surgeon
- Kalamandalam Haridas (1946–2005), Kathakali musician
- Nanabhai Haridas (1832–1889), first Indian Justice of the Bombay High Court during
- Neena Haridas (born 1973), Indian journalist and writer
- Rahul Haridas, Indian film actor
- Ramya Haridas (born 1987), Indian politician and social worker
- Ranjini Haridas, Indian television anchor, movie artist, and model
- Sadhu Haridas, 19th century yogi and fakir
- Swami Haridas, saint-musician and a pioneer in the Hindustani classical music

== See also ==
- Haridaspur (disambiguation)
