= The Park, Chennai =

Luxury hotel in Chennai, India

The Park Chennai
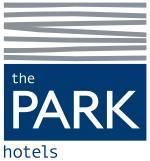
- Hotel chain: The Park Hotels

General information
- Location: Chennai, India, 601, Anna Salai, Near U.S. Consulate; Chennai, Tamil Nadu 600 006
- Coordinates: 13.052956°N 80.249923°E
- Opening: 15 May 2002
- Owner: The Park Hotels
- Operator: The Park Hotels

Technical details
- Floor count: 12

Design and construction
- Architects: Hirsch Bedner Associates, Los Angeles

Other information
- Number of rooms: 214
- Number of suites: 15
- Number of restaurants: 5

Website
- http://www.theparkhotels.com/chennai-park/chennai-park.html

The Park Chennai is a five-star deluxe hotel located at the Anna Flyover junction on the erstwhile Gemini Studios premises on Anna Salai, Chennai, India. The hotel, part of the Apeejay Surrendra Group, was opened on 15 May 2002 at an investment of around ₹ 1 billion.

== History ==
The place where The Park hotel stands today was the location of the Gemini Studios, a historic film studio since the 1940s. Gemini Studios, established on Mount Road as "Movieland" by filmmaker K. Subrahmanyam, was the city's biggest studio. In 1940, the studio was destroyed by a fire. S. S. Vasan, a Tamil film maker and a friend of K. Subramaniam, bought the Motion Picture Producers' Combines studio in a court auction for ₹ 86,427-11-9, the odd figure was arrived at by including the interest on unpaid wages of the employees. The studio was rebuilt and opened under the name Gemini Studios in 1941, which went on to become one of the finest studio and a legendary film production centre in the Subcontinent. Gemini Pictures declined in the 1970s though it remain successful as a studio and equipment rental business. In the 1990s, two buildings were built in the corner of the studio's premises only to be considered unfavourable among buyers. By the turn of the 21st century, the Kolkata-based Park Group of Hotels bought the three-star property in the premises and turned it into a five-star luxury hotel and opened it on 15 May 2002 at a cost of ₹ 1,100 million. In the same year, the other block was scheduled for auction by Indian Bank with a reserve price of ₹ 930 million.

In 2010, the hotel had a legal fight with the Corporation of Chennai over the ownership of an open space reservation (OSR) land on which the hotel's perimeter compound wall with fountains was built.

== The hotel ==
The art-concept boutique hotel has 214 rooms, including 120 Deluxe rooms, 79 Luxury rooms, 6 Studio suites, 5 Deluxe suites, 3 Premier suites and 1 Presidential suite. Dining facilities in the hotel include a Thai restaurant named Lotus, 601 (Six-O-One) All day dining restaurant, Pasha–Night club and the Aqua & A2 Restaurants situated on the eighth floor. The hotel also has a bar named the Leather Bar as a tribute to the city's leather industry. The hotel also has a shopping arcade.

== Awards ==
In 2006, Forbes listed "Atrium" in The Park hotel, Chennai, with its menu designed by Italian chef Antonio Carluccio, amongst India's top 10 most expensive restaurants.

== See also ==
- Hotels in Chennai
- List of tallest buildings in Chennai
