= Indraprastham (film) =

- Directed by: Haridas
- Written by: Robin Thirumala
- Produced by: Premkumar Marath
- Starring: Mammootty; Vikram; Simran
- Cinematography: Sanjeev Shankar
- Edited by: K. Sankunny
- Music by: Vidyasagar
- Release date: 23 August 1996 (India)
- Running time: 145 minutes
- Country: India
- Language: Malayalam

Indraprastham is a 1996 Indian Malayalam-language political action thriller directed by Haridas, starring Mammootty, Vikram, Simran and Prakash Raj in prominent roles. The film marks the debut of Simran in Malayalam cinema.

== Plot ==
Chitra Narayan, a political journalist, is in love with a bumbling actor named Kiran Varma in Delhi. Kiran ends up being accused and arrested for the murder of a woman Anitha Kulkarni; the evidence lies in a surveillance video that shows Kiran to be the culprit. Chitra refuses to believes that Kiran is guilty and vows to prove his innocence, but she gets hounded by several goons even after she heads over to Bangalore.

Eventually, Chitra finds herself saved by a software engineer Sathish Menon and his friend Peter. Using a computer software that he designed for NASA, Sathish deduces that Kiran's face was only morphed into the video and that the real murderer is Paul B. Issac, a corrupt politician who sent the goons after Chitra. Determined to expose Issac as the true culprit, Sathish tries many times to expose Issac; even arranging for Kiran to be brought to court in hopes of clearing his name. Unfortunately, Issac uses his political influence to murder Kiran and cripple Sathish's company with huge losses, much to Chitra's distraught.

Despite the setbacks, Sathish refuses to back down and eventually succeeds in exposing Issac as the true murderer to the public. An enraged Issac leads his goons to take down Sathish, Peter and Chitra in revenge, but Sathish and Peter kills Issac and his goons, thus bringing full closure.

== Cast ==
- Mammootty as Sathish Menon
- Vikram as Peter
- Simran as Chitra Narayanan
- Prakash Raj as Mohan George
- Devan as Paul B. Issac
- Akshay Anand as Kiran Verma
- M. G. Soman as K. N. Nair
- Oduvil Unnikrishnan as Manikkoth Kunjukrishna Panicker
- Nirosha as Anitha Kulkarni
- Hemant Birje as Shyam Kaushik
- Azeez as Police Commissioner
- Abu Salim as Mercenary
- C. R. Saraswathi as Dance Teacher
- Priya Raman in the item number
- Sakshi Shivanand in item number

== Music ==
The film score is composed by Vidyasagar

Song title	Singers
"Thanka Thinkal"	M. G. Sreekumar, K. S. Chitra
"Parayumo Mookayamaame"	K. J. Yesudas
"Mazhavillin Kottarathhil"	Sujatha Mohan, Biju Narayanan
"Dekho Simple Magic"	Biju Narayanan
"Bolo Bolo"	K. J. Yesudas

== Release ==
The film was released on 23 August 1996, and did not perform well in the box office.

The film was dubbed and released in Tamil as Delhi Darbar, with a reviewer noting "the strong cast is the main attraction".
