= Karan Paul =

Indian businessman (born 1969)

- Born: 3 November 1969 (age 56); Kolkata, West Bengal, India
- Education: Brown University
- Occupations: Chairman, Apeejay Surrendra Group
- Spouse: Indrani Dasgupta
- Parent(s): Surrendra Paul and Shirin Paul
- Family: Priti Paul, Priya Paul (sisters), Anand Paul (brother)

Karan Paul (born 3 November 1969) is an Indian businessman and the chairman of the Apeejay Surrendra Group, an Indian family business.

== Career ==
Paul joined the Apeejay Surrendra Group in 1992. His first businesses were Apeejay Finance, a finance company, and Apeejay Securities, a stockbroking company, which he ran for about ten years and sold them off in 2006-07. After working at various levels in the Apeejay Surrendra Group for 12 years, Karan became the Chairman of the Group in 2004.

Paul managed Apeejay Tea, Apeejay Shipping, and Apeejay Schools. The group acquired the FMCG brand Typhoo, which had operations in nearly 50 countries. The group also diversified into new business ventures of marine cluster and logistics parks which has backward and forward integrated the group's shipping business. The real estate division has increased land banks, consolidated, and grown real estate commercial developments across India. He is director and member of Apeejay Surrendra Park Hotels Limited, K.P.H. Dream Cricket Private Limited, Apeejay Tea Limited, Apeejay Shipping Limited, Apeejay Infralogistics Private Limited, and Bengal Shipyard Limited.

== Board memberships ==
Paul has been on the executive committees of various chambers of commerce like CII, FICCI, ICC, Bharat Chamber of Commerce, and Bengal Chamber of Commerce.

== Awards ==
In 2006, Karan Paul was awarded one of Italy's highest honors 'Order of the Star of Italian Solidarity' by Gianni Vernetti, Minister of State of the Ministry of External Affairs, in New Delhi. In 2012, the International Confederation of NGOs awarded him the 'Karmaveer Puraskaar, 2012 Corporate Citizen for Holistic CSR Initiatives' award.

== Philanthropy ==
Philanthropic initiatives created by him include:

- The Paul Foundation – In 2001, he put in place a system of providing grants to students aiming for higher studies in India and abroad through The Paul Foundation.
- Inclusive Sports – In 2015, a reward and recognition platform with the UK's national charity, the English Federation of Disability Sport (EFDS) was created to ensure that more disabled athletes have access to local competitions.
- Anand Paul Education Support Programme – In 2009, the program was started by Karan Paul to identify children from the poorest areas around Park Street, who had either dropped out of school or were not enrolled in school, and help them return to school.
- 100 for 100 – The Group's centenary in 2010 was celebrated with 100 community initiatives. Projects spread across education, environment, art & culture, capacity building of institutions especially those that help the disabled, and focused on the physical and mental health of children and women were designed and implemented.
- Art, Heritage & Culture – Park Mansions, a residential and commercial building developed by Armenian jute merchant, T.M. Thaddeus in 1910, owned by Apeejay was restored under his supervision.
- Human-Wildlife Conflict Mitigation – In 2015, he created a three-year management strategy that will see the Group's tea plantations company invest in reducing the impact of Human Elephant Conflict in Assam. The project was implemented in partnership with the World Wide Fund for Nature (WWF).

== Personal life ==
Karan Paul is a sports enthusiast and loves the sport of cricket. He is the co-owner of the Punjab Kings (PBKS) franchise team of the Indian Premier League (IPL) along with Preity Zinta, Ness Wadia, and Mohit Burman. The team is based in Mohali, Punjab. He occasionally writes columns.

Karan Paul is married to Indrani Dasgupta, together they have two children Uma Kismat Paul and Kabir Anand Paul.
