= Uttank Vora =

Indian music director and composer

- Born: 23 June 1968; Mumbai, India
- Occupation(s): Music Director, Music Composer
- Spouse: Chhaya Vora
- Parent(s): Pandit Vinayak Rai Vora; Premila Vora
- Family: Neeraj Vora

Uttank Vora (born 23 June 1968) is an Indian music director and composer for films, television, and theater, is the youngest son of Pt. Vinayakrai Vora. He is best known for his work in Meerabai (1997 serial on Doordarshan), Khichdi (2002), Baa Bahoo Aur Baby (2005) and Sarabhai vs Sarabhai (2004) - four of the most successful shows of the Indian television industry. He also composed the music for the second season of Sarabhai vs Sarabhai – Take 2 (2017) along with his son – Uroovaak Vora.

Vora's career in Indian cinema began with Ashutosh Gowariker’s Pehla Nasha (1993).

== Early life and family ==
Vora was born and brought up in Mumbai to a Gujarati family in 1968. He grew up in Santacruz, a Mumbai suburb. His father Pt. Vinayakrai Nanalal Vora was a composer, classical musician, vocalist, and instrumentalist. Pt. Vinayak Vora popularized the Tar-Shehnai as the solo instrument for classical music. Pt. Vinayak Vora graduated from Rajkot and taught music at Rajkumar College for a brief span of time before moving to Mumbai. While he was associated with All India Radio (AIR), he was also sought out as a soloist and as an accompanist in several Sangeet Sammelans in India and abroad.

Uttank comes from a musical family and hence the atmosphere around the house was that of music. His father took non-profitable music classes at home. He started training under his father from the age of 6. By the age of 10, Vora would handle his father's classes and at the age of 12, he began tutoring on his own.

He completed his schooling at Sheth Anandilal Podar High School (Santacruz West) and joined Mithibai College before dropping out at the age of 18 owing to building number of commercial projects. Uttank is married to Chhaya Vora, a renowned film, television and stage actor. His brother Neeraj Vora was an Indian director, writer, and actor.

== Career ==
=== Beginning ===
Before making music commercially, Uttank started composing music at home. He then started professionally composing and recording for private albums at the age of 14. His first semi-commercial project was with Mahendra Joshi.

=== Theater career ===
Uttank started his theatre career with Tathaiya, a Gujarati musical produced and directed by Mahendra Joshi. The play opened at Prithvi theatre. Vora did the music for the play. Post this, he worked with Joshi on several other plays. His first commercial play was Yuddh, which was directed by Latesh Shah and produced by Upendra Trivedi. In 2000, he composed for Khel, a two-character play directed by Paresh Rawal. Naseeruddin Shah and Paresh were the only two actors in the play.

=== Television shows ===
From Gujarati plays, he ventured into Gujarati serials. Initially, he composed only the songs, mainly title tracks. He began scoring after Vipul Amrutlal Shah asked him to compose the background music for his television shows. Uttank began composing music for Hindi television shows as well. He changed the way music was composed for television. Some of the superhit shows that he lent music for include Meerabai, Khichdi, Sarabhai vs Sarabhai, Ek Mahal Ho Sapno Ka and Baa Bahu Aur Baby.

=== Gujarati cinema ===
Uttank's first Gujarati film as a music director was Dariya Choru released in the year 1999. The film directed by Vipul Amrutlal Shah wasn't released properly.

=== Hindi cinema ===
Ashutosh Gowariker approached him to compose the songs for his debut film Pehla Nasha with his brother Neeraj Vora. Although the film didn't fare well on box office, the music was appreciated. In 1999, Uttank composed the music for Akshay Kumar-Preity Zinta starrer Sangharsh. He also composed the background music for the 2005 film Waqt: The Race Against Time which was a commercial success. In 2006, he composed the songs for the film Malamaal Weekly which was written and directed by Priyadarshan.
