= Haridaspur =

Haridaspur may refer to:

- Haridaspur, Bangladesh
- Haridaspur, Orissa, India
- Haridaspur, Uttar Pradesh, India
- Haridaspur, North 24 Parganas, West Bengal, India
- Haridaspur, Birbhum, West Bengal, India

== See also ==
- Haridas (disambiguation)
- Pur (disambiguation)
