= Chhaya Vora =

Indian actress

- Born: Gujarat, India
- Occupation: Actor
- Spouse: Uttank Vora
- Family: Neeraj Vora

Chhaya Vora is an Indian television and film actress. Her works are predominantly present in Hindi and Gujarati film industries. She is the daughter-in-law of Gujarati instrumentalist Vinayakrai Vora. Vora started her career with Gujarati theatre in late 1980s.

== Career ==
Vora started her career as a Gujarati theatre artist in 1986. She got her first break in the Gujarati movie Mijaaj(2018). Her next project was Chitkar (2018). Her last release was the 2022 Gujarati film Chabutro. She played the mother of Gangubai in the biographical movie Gangubai Kathiawadi. She acted in the Indian soap opera Shubharambh as the main cast.
