= Kim Sharma =

Indian actress and model

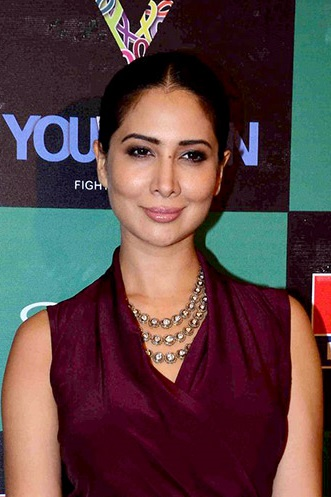
- Sharma in 2016
- Born: Kim Michelle Sharma; Ahmednagar, Maharashtra, India
- Occupations: Actress; model
- Years active: 2000–2010
- Spouse: Ali Punjani (m. 2010; div. 2016)
- Partner: Leander Paes

Kim Michelle Sharma is an Indian former actress and model who worked in Hindi and Telugu films. She made her acting debut in the 2000-romantic drama Mohabbatein for which she won the IIFA Award for Star Debut of the Year – Female. Sharma went on to appear in films such as Tum Se Achcha Kaun Hai (2002), Khadgam (2002), Fida (2004), Taj Mahal: An Eternal Love Story (2005) and Godfather (2007).

== Personal life ==
Sharma was born to a Hindu father and Christian mother, and was raised as a Christian. Her family's patron saint is Saint Michael after whom she received her middle name.

== Filmography ==
=== Films ===
Year	Title	Role	Language	Notes	Ref.
2000	Mohabbatein	Sanjana "Sanju" Paul	Hindi		
2002	Tum Se Achcha Kaun Hai	Bobby Gujral	Hindi		
2002	Kehtaa Hai Dil Baar Baar	Ritu Patel	Hindi		
2002	Khadgam	Pooja	Telugu		
2003	Alai	Dancer	Tamil	Special appearance in song "Paiyya Paiyya"	
2004	Fida	Sonia Mukherjee	Hindi		
2005	Padmashree Laloo Prasad Yadav	Rita	Hindi		
2005	Yakeen	Tanya Thakur	Hindi		
2005	Taj Mahal: An Eternal Love Story	Ladli Begum	Hindi		
2006	Tom, Dick, and Harry	Bijli	Hindi		
2006	Ladies Tailor	Radhika	Hindi		
2006	Zindaggi Rocks	Joy	Hindi		
2006	Kudiyon Ka Hai Zamana	Kanika	Hindi		
2007	Nehlle Pe Dehlla	Kim	Hindi		
2007	Heyy Babyy	Bharat's girlfriend	Hindi	Special appearance	
2007	Chhodon Naa Yaar	Rashmi	Hindi		
2007	Godfather	—N/a	Urdu	Pakistani film	
2008	Money Hai Toh Honey Hai	Sara Das	Hindi		
2008	Deshdrohi	Herself	Hindi	Special appearance in song	
2009	Magadheera	Herself	Telugu	Special appearance in song "Jorsey"	
2009	Anjaneyulu	Herself	Telugu	Special appearance in song	
2009	Daddy Cool: Join the Fun	Jenny	Hindi		
2009	Marega Salaa	Tanya Singhania	Hindi		
2010	Yagam	Sophie	Telugu		
2011	Loot	Sharmili M. Siqueira "SMS"	Hindi		

=== Television ===
Year	Title	Role	Notes	Ref.
2004	Carryy on Shekhar	Herself	Episode 30	

== Awards and nominations ==
Year	Award	Category	Work	Result	Ref.
2001	International Indian Film Academy Awards	Star Debut of the Year – Female	Mohabbatein	Won	
2001	Sansui Viewers' Choice Movie Awards	Most Promising Debut Actress	Mohabbatein	Nominated	
2001	People's Choice Awards India	Favourite Debut Actor – Female	Mohabbatein	Nominated	
