= Nehlle Pe Dehlla =

2007 Indian film by Ajay Chandok

- Theatrical release poster
- Directed by: Ajay Chandhok
- Written by: Yunus Sajawal; Ajay Chandhok; Rumi Jaffery (dialogues)
- Produced by: Mahendra Dhariwal
- Starring: Sanjay Dutt; Saif Ali Khan; Bipasha Basu; Kim Sharma
- Cinematography: Najeeb Khan
- Edited by: Nitin Rokade
- Music by: Anand Raj Anand; Pritam; Daboo Malik; Nitin Shankar
- Production company: Mahindra Dhariwal Films
- Release date: 2007
- Running time: 124 minutes
- Country: India
- Language: Hindi
- Box office: ₹6.41 crore

Nehlle Pe Dehlla (transl. Tit for tat) is a 2007 Indian Hindi-language action comedy film directed by Ajay Chandok. The film stars Sanjay Dutt, Saif Ali Khan, Bipasha Basu and Kim Sharma. The film was completed in 2002 but was released in 2007.

== Plot ==
Johnny and Jimmy are small-time crooks who dream of becoming rich. They are in jail, where they regularly end up for their misdeeds. A hotel manager, Ballu, embezzles 300,000,000 rupees from his company. Johnny and Jimmy learn about this and plan to blackmail him. They join the hotel as waiters and wait for the perfect opportunity, but a terrible mobster trio led by Diler and his brothers, Hansa and Jazzy, kills Ballu. When Johnny and Jimmy find Ballu dead, they take his body and present him as if he were alive. They continue this deception while trying to find the real culprits.

Johnny meets Ballu's niece, Pooja, and Jimmy meets her friend, Kim. They all fall in love. After discovering the real culprits, along with a corpse and a map leading to the money, they set off on a chase to find it, with Diler, Hansa and Jazzy also pursuing the same goal.

When they arrive, they find that the mobsters have already taken the money. They track the trio to their hideout and recover it. The mobsters then confront Jimmy and Johnny, and when they refuse to hand over the money, the trio kidnaps Pooja and Jimmy. Kim and Johnny attempt a rescue by offering the money to the mobsters. A fight breaks out, and eventually the police arrive. The trio is arrested. Johnny marries Pooja and Jimmy marries Kim. They go on to live a happy and clean life with her uncle's money.

== Cast ==
- Sanjay Dutt as Johnny
- Saif Ali Khan as Jimmy
- Bipasha Basu as Pooja Sahni
- Kim Sharma as Kim
- Shakti Kapoor as Balram Sahni "Ballu"
- Mukesh Rishi as Diler
- Daman Maan as Inspector
- Avtar Gill as Ram Prasad Gupta
- Shiva Rindani as Jazzy
- Aasif Sheikh as Hansa
- Supriya Karnik as Mata Ji behen ji tantrik
- Neha Dhupia as item dancer in the song ''Parvar Digara'' (special appearance)
- Shwetha Menon as item dancer in the song ''Imaan Dol Jaayenge'' (special appearance)
- Ganesh Acharya as himself in the song ''Imaan Dol Jaayenge'' (special appearance)
- Master Raju as cameo special appearance

== Soundtrack ==
Title	Singer(s)	Music	Lyrics
"Dil Naiyo Maane Re"	Himesh Reshammiya	Himesh Reshammiya	
"Nehle Pe Dehlla"	Shaan	Nitin Shankar	Paanchi Jalonvi
"Husn Husn"	Sonu Nigam, Jaspinder Narula	Anand Raj Anand	Dev Kohli
"Parvar Digara"	KK, Tulsi Kumar	Pritam	Paanchi Jalonvi
"Bottle Mein Main"	Vinod Rathod, Abhijeet Bhattacharya, Sunidhi Chauhan	Daboo Malik	Salim Bijnori
"Imaan Dol Jaayenge"	Sunidhi Chauhan, Vinod Rathod	Anand Raj Anand	Dev Kohli
"Neeli Neeli Aankhon Wali"	Mika Singh, Tarannum Malik	Anand Raj Anand	Dev Kohli
"Hoga Hoga Khuda Gawah"	Zubeen Garg	DJ Suketu, Aks	Sameer

Nehlle Pe Dehlla

Soundtrack album by Anand Raaj Anand Daboo Malik Pritam Chakraborty
- Released: 3 January 2007
- Genre: Feature film soundtrack
- Label: T-Series

== Reception ==
The BBC wrote a scathing review of the film, describing it as a "farce from beginning to end". Taran Adarsh called it a "poor show all the way".
