= Neeraj Vora =

Indian film director (1963–2017)

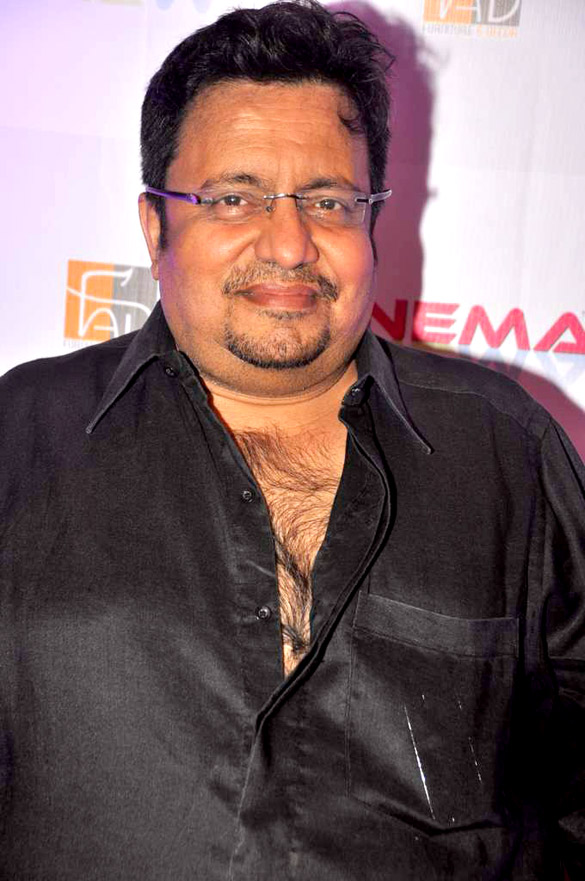
- Vora in July 2012
- Born: 22 January 1963; Bhuj, Gujarat, India
- Died: 14 December 2017 (aged 54); Mumbai, Maharashtra, India
- Occupations: Film director; writer; actor; film producer; composer
- Years active: 1984–2016
- Parents: Pandit Vinayak Rai Vora (father); Premila Vora (mother)
- Relatives: Uttank Vora (Brother); Chhaya Vora (Sister-in-law)

Neeraj Vora (22 January 1963 – 14 December 2017) was an Indian film director, writer, actor and composer from Gujarat. He made a mark in Bollywood with his work as a writer for Ram Gopal Verma's film Rangeela (1995). His directorial debut was Akshay Kumar starrer Khiladi 420 in 2000 and also directed Phir Hera Pheri (2006). He has written screenplay and dialogues of some popular Bollywood comedy films including Hera Pheri franchise, Garam Masala (2005), Bhagam Bhag (2006), Golmaal: Fun Unlimited (2006), Bhool Bhulaiya (2007). As an actor, his notable work includes Mann (1999), Hello Brother (1999), Khatta Meetha (2010), Bol Bachchan (2012).

He suffered a stroke in October 2016, putting him in coma. He was working on Hera Pheri 3 before he went into coma and died on 14 December 2017 at 4 a.m. in Criticare hospital, Mumbai.

== Early life and career ==
Vora was born in Bhuj, Gujarat in a Gujarati family in 1963. But he grew up in Santacruz, a suburb of Mumbai, Maharashtra. His father, Pandit Vinayak Rai Nanalal Vora was a classical musician and a proponent of Tar-Shehnai. His father popularised Tar-Shehnai as the solo instrument for classical music.

=== Acting ===
During his college days, he started working professionally as an actor and he received intercollegiate awards for drama. In 1984, he worked for the film Holi, by Ketan Mehta and later did a television show Choti Badi Baatien, Circus.

He later worked as an actor in Rangeela too, as the film director wanted to bring down the sets and the actor was absent. Neeraj Vora, who had written the script, played the role to finish shooting. After seeing that scene, Anil Kapoor and Priyadarshan called him for Virasat, followed by Aamir for Mann and several other projects.One of the iconic ones are The role of Sr.Inspector in Hello Brother.

=== Drama ===
His 1992 Gujarati play Aflatoon, which was a superhit was adapted by Rohit Shetty for Golmaal. The play was written and directed by Neeraj Vora.

=== Writing ===
After Circus in 1993, Neeraj Vora, Ashutosh Gowarikar and Deepak Tijori got together and made Pehla Nasha, with Deepak Tijori as lead actor. Neeraj Vora was the writer and he along with his brother directed music as Neeraj-Uttank. Later his career in writing took off after he wrote for Rangeela and then Akele Hum Akele Tum, Josh, Badshah, Chori Chori Chupke Chupke, Awara Paagal Deewana, Deewane Huye Paagal, Ajnabee, Hera Pheri and Phir Hera Pheri among many others. Vora's work has always been appreciated by the critics. For Phir Hera Pheri, film critic Taran Adarsh said: "Vora's dialogues, as always, are outstanding!"

=== Film direction ===
He first directed Khiladi 420, which did not fare well. After that he decided to produce films and took up Familywala. After writing Awara Paagal Deewana and Deewane Huye Paagal for Firoz Nadiadwala, they collaborated for Phir Hera Pheri, which was to be directed by Satish Kaushik, but following the problems with dates, Neeraj Vora got the chance to direct it.

Vora was slated to direct Hera Pheri 3, but ultimately was replaced by Ahmed Khan following the departure of actors John Abraham, Abhishek Bachchan and Sunil Shetty, due to conflicts with Vora. Vora was retained as the film's executive producer, but following his stroke in October 2016 and his death in December 2017, it was confirmed on 11 May 2018, that Hera Pheri 3 will now be directed by Indra Kumar. But now Indra Kumar has left the film and the original director Priyadarshan has confirmed that he will direct the movie with the three original protagonists Akshay Kumar, Sunil Shetty and Paresh Rawal.

== Illness and death ==
Neeraj Vora, who had been suffering from complications of a massive stroke for a long time, died at the age of 54 on 14 December 2017. The actor-director was reportedly in a coma for 13 months after suffering from the stroke. He reportedly died at 4 am at Criti Care hospital in Andheri, Mumbai. Vora had been staying at producer Firoz Nadiadwala's house since October 2016 after slipping into coma due to a heart-attack followed by a brain stroke. Nadiadwala had brought him to his home and converted a room into a makeshift Intensive Care Unit (ICU).

== Filmography ==
Key
| † | Denotes films that have not yet been released |

=== As director and writer ===
List of Neeraj Vora film credits as a director and writer
| Year | Title | Director | Writer | Notes |
|---|---|---|---|---|
| 1994 | Pehla Nasha | No | Yes | |
| 1995 | Baazi | No | Yes | |
| 1995 | Rangeela | No | Dialogue | |
| 1999 | Baadshah | No | Yes | |
| 2000 | Hera Pheri | No | Yes | |
| 2000 | Josh | No | Yes | |
| 2000 | Khiladi 420 | Yes | Yes | |
| 2000 | Mela | No | Yes | |
| 2001 | Yeh Teraa Ghar Yeh Meraa Ghar | No | Yes | |
| 2001 | Ajnabee | No | Yes | |
| 2001 | Chori Chori Chupke Chupke | No | Story | |
| 2001 | Yeh Teraa Ghar Yeh Meraa Ghar | No | Yes | |
| 2002 | Kehta Hai Dil Baar Baar | No | Dialogue | |
| 2002 | Awaara Paagal Deewana | No | Dialogue | |
| 2003 | Kuch Naa Kaho | No | Yes | |
| 2003 | Hungama | No | Dialogue | |
| 2003 | Tujhe Meri Kasam | No | Dialogue | |
| 2004 | Hulchul | No | Yes | |
| 2005 | Deewane Huye Paagal | No | Dialogue | |
| 2005 | Garam Masala | No | Dialogue | |
| 2005 | Kasak | No | Yes | |
| 2006 | Bhagam Bhag | No | Yes | |
| 2006 | Chup Chup Ke | No | Dialogue | |
| 2006 | Golmaal: Fun Unlimited | No | Yes | |
| 2006 | Phir Hera Pheri | Yes | Yes | |
| 2007 | Bhool Bhulaiyaa | No | Yes | |
| 2007 | Fool N Final | No | Yes | |
| 2009 | Shortkut: The Con Is On | Yes | Yes | |
| 2013 | Kamaal Dhamaal Malamaal | No | Yes | |
| 2014 | Familywala | Yes | No | |
| 2026 | Welcome to the Jungle | No | Story | Posthumous release |

=== As an actor ===
List of Neeraj Vora acting credits
| Year | Title | Role |
|---|---|---|
| 1984 | Holi | Narendra |
| 1989 | Salim Langde Pe Mat Ro | Churan miya |
| 1992 | Raju Ban Gaya Gentleman | Abdul |
| 1995 | Akele Hum Akele Tum | Moolchand (Grocer) |
| 1995 | Rangeela | Drunk party guest (bluffer) |
| 1997 | Daud | Chacko |
| 1997 | Virasat | Surkhiya |
| 1998 | Satya | Music Director Ronusagar |
| 1999 | Baadshah | Dr. Rusi Surti (CBI) |
| 1999 | Hello Brother | Sr. Inspector |
| 1999 | Mann | Nattu |
| 1999 | Mast | Usman Bhai |
| 2000 | Dhadkan | Babban Miyan |
| 2000 | Har Dil Jo Pyar Karega | Abdul |
| 2000 | jung | Lachmandas "Lacchu" Dholakia |
| 2000 | Pukar | Mayor |
| 2001 | Yeh Teraa Ghar Yeh Meraa Ghar | Seth Haribhau |
| 2002 | Company | Sanam Khan |
| 2002 | Maine Dil Tujhko Diya | College Principal |
| 2002 | Tum Se Achcha Kaun Hai | A. R. Siddqui |
| 2003 | Khushi | Shimbhu Moshai |
| 2009 | Shortkut | |
| 2010 | Khatta Meetha | Madhav Ganpule |
| 2010 | Na Ghar Ke Na Ghaat Ke | Mr. R. K. Khanna |
| 2011 | Bin Bulaye Baraati | Police Commissioner |
| 2012 | Bol Bachchan | Maakhan |
| 2012 | Department | in a dual role as Lalchand and Valchand |
| 2012 | Kamaal Dhamaal Malamaal | Pintoo D'Costa, coffin seller and friend of Johny |
| 2012 | Tezz | Neerav Shah |
| 2013 | Kamaal Dhamaal Malamaal | Pintoo D'Costa, coffin seller and friend of Johny |
| 2013 | Phata Poster Nikhla Hero | Inspection officer |
| 2014 | Familywala | |
| 2015 | Welcome Back | Badshah Khan |
