= Tum Se Achcha Kaun Hai =

- Directed by: Deepak Anand
- Written by: Sujit Sen; Lalit Mahajan
- Produced by: Ganesh Jain; Ratan Jain
- Starring: Nakul Kapoor; Aarti Chabria; Kim Sharma
- Cinematography: Nirmal Jani
- Edited by: Deepak Anand
- Music by: Songs: Nadeem-Shravan; Score: Surinder Sodhi
- Production company: Venus Films
- Release date: 26 April 2002
- Running time: 150 minutes
- Country: India
- Language: Hindi
- Box office: ₹16 crore

Tum Se Achcha Kaun Hai is a 2002 Indian Hindi-language musical romantic drama film directed by Deepak Anand. The film stars debutant Nakul Kapoor, Kim Sharma, and Aarti Chabria.

== Plot ==
Working as a guide and bus driver in Jaisalmer, Arjun (Nakul Kapoor) had always dreamt of being a famous singer. When he meets beautiful tourist Naina Dixit (Aarti Chabria), he impresses her with his singing. She encourages him to come to Bombay to try his luck there and leaves her address with him. Shortly thereafter, Arjun bids farewell to his brother, his sister-in-law (Navni Parihar), and his nephew and goes to Bombay. Upon arrival, he meets Naina's friend, Monto (Raghuvir Yadav), who takes him to several places to try his luck. No one bothers to listen to him, let alone hear him sing.

He lives with Naina, her sisters, Anu and Tuktuk, and their college professor mom (Rati Agnihotri), who empathize with him. Then Naina hits upon an idea to have an open song-and-dance show in a public park. The show goes well, and a wealthy young woman, Bobby (Kim Sharma), notices Arjun and invites him to sing for a firm run by her dad's partner, Sunil Mahadevan. When Sunil refuses to get involved, Bobby talks to her dad Gujral (Dalip Tahil) and opens her own recording company with his help, featuring Arjun as the main artist. Bobby and Gujral are very supportive of Arjun.

Arjun becomes famous overnight but has not forgotten Naina and her family. This does not augur well with Bobby, who is very possessive and wants Arjun all to herself. She makes up her mind that she will never permit anyone to come close to Arjun—she has a gun and knows how to use it. But soon she realizes that she can't get him as he belongs to Naina and loves her only. Unable to cope with the pressure of losing her love, Bobby tries to commit suicide by throwing herself from the hill with her car. After some time, Arjun is shown receiving the award for best singer and thanking Bobby. Then it is shown that Bobby, now in a mentally and physically disabled condition, is watching Arjun live, seeing him thank her.

== Cast ==
- Nakul Kapoor as Arjun Singh
- Aarti Chabria as Naina Dixit
- Kim Sharma as Bobby Gujral
- Dalip Tahil as Gujral
- Raghuvir Yadav as Manto
- Navni Parihar as Arjun's sister-in-law
- Viju Khote as Inspector Vijay Chander
- Rati Agnihotri as Professor Dixit
- Ali Asgar as Ali
- Adi Irani as Amar Deep
- Anant Mahadevan as Sunil Mahadevan
- Neha Pendse as Anu Dixit
- Girja Shankar as Arjun's brother
- Neeraj Vora as A. R. Siddqui

== Soundtrack ==
The music of the film was composed by Nadeem-Shravan with lyrics written by Sameer.

Song	Singer(s)
"Tum Se Achcha Kaun Hai"	Tauseef Akhtar
"Dil Gaya Mera Dil Gaya"	Sonu Nigam
"Ye Un Dino Ki Baat Hai"	Sonu Nigam, Sarika Kapoor
"Aankh Hai Bhari Bhari" (Female)	Alka Yagnik
"Aap Jaisa"	Sukhwinder Singh
"Door Wadiyon Se"	Sonu Nigam
"Jo Jaam Se Peeta Hoon"	Sonu Nigam, Tauseef Akhtar
"Aankh Hai Bhari Bhari" (Male)	Kumar Sanu

== Reception ==
Taran Adarsh of Bollywood Hungama gave 2 out of 5 stars, writing "On the whole, Tum Se Achcha Kaun Hai is not one that would set the box-office ablaze, yet it's better than most mundane, run-of-the-mill types released of late. Has the potential to pick up with word of mouth publicity. The strategy of releasing the film in limited, small and select theatres should also help to an extent".
