= Deep Pal =

Indian cinematographer (1953–2021)

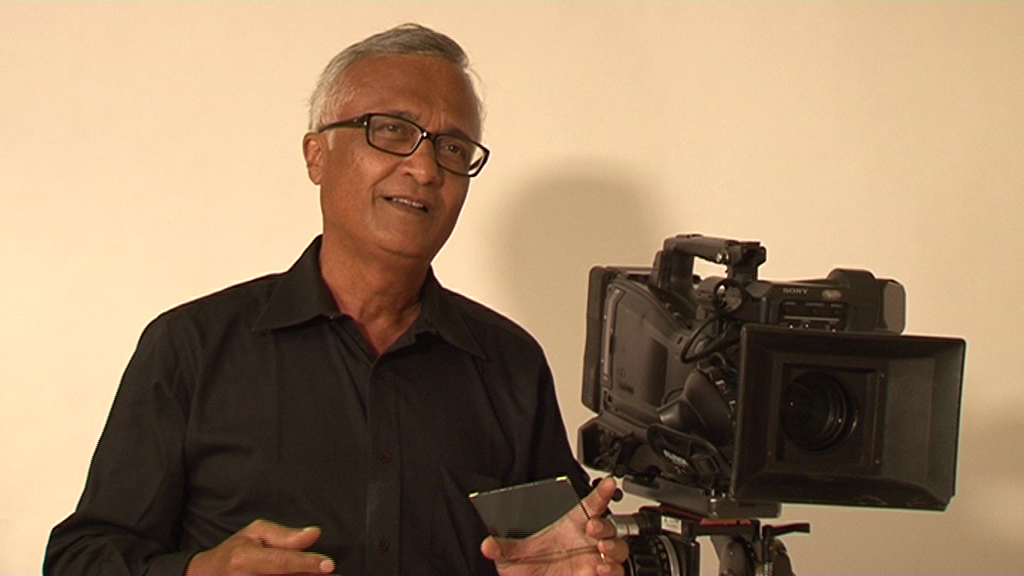
- Born: Abhijit Pal; 16 April 1953; Bombay, Bombay State, India
- Died: 7 October 2021 (aged 68); Hyderabad, Telangana, India
- Occupations: Cinematographer, Director of Photography & Steadicam Operator
- Years active: 1974 - 2020
- Relatives: Colin Pal (father); Niranjan Pal (grandfather); Bipin Chandra Pal (great-grandfather)

Deep Pal (16 April 1953 – 7 October 2021) was an Indian cinematographer. He was the son of publicist Colin Pal and grandson of director Niranjan Pal. He started his career with Basu Bhattacharya doing camerawork for 1974 Hindi film Avishkaar, before moving on to an independent career as a documentary filmmaker. Pal is known as being one of the pioneers of Steadicam camerawork in India. Pal's first major Steadicam work was in Shiva, which was considered a pathbreaking film on visual technique in Telugu cinema. His later work included Bandit Queen (1994) directed by Shekhar Kapur and Dil Se.. (1998) directed by Mani Ratnam. He died of cancer on 7 October 2021.

== Filmography ==
=== As a cinematographer ===
While his primary recognition was for his work in bringing image-stabilizing technology to camerawork in India, prior to a Steadicam, he cinematographed and directed his own documentary films including Cages (1984) on prostitution in Falkland Road in Mumbai, and Give us this Day our Daily Lunch (1985) based on the Dabbawala food delivery system in Bombay.

In 1993, he was Director of Photography (DOP) in the Hindi Feature Film Pehla Nasha, the first directorial venture of filmmaker Ashutosh Gowariker.

Year	Film	Director
1993	Pehla Nasha	Ashutosh Gowariker
2015	Stripped	Srivinay Salian

=== As a steadicam operator ===
Year	Film	Director
1997	Border	J.P. Dutta
1999	Laawaris	Shrikant Sharma
1999	Hum Saath-Saath Hain: We Stand United	Sooraj R. Barjatya
2001	The Roshans: Hrithik Live in Concert	Akashdeep
2002	Filhaal...	Meghna Gulzar
2007	Amal	Richie Mehta
