= Kehtaa Hai Dil Baar Baar =

- Directed by: Rahul Dholakia
- Written by: Neeraj Vora
- Produced by: Kishor Dadlaney; Lal Dadlaney
- Starring: Jimmy Sheirgill; Kim Sharma; Paresh Rawal
- Cinematography: Ashok Kumar
- Edited by: Chandan Arora
- Music by: Jatin–Lalit
- Release date: 15 November 2002
- Country: India
- Language: Hindi

Kehtaa Hai Dil Baar Baar (transl. "My Heart Says it over and over") is a 2002 Indian Hindi-language romantic film directed by Rahul Dholakia, starring Jimmy Sheirgill, Kim Sharma and Paresh Rawal.

== Plot ==
Ranchhod Rai Patel (Paresh Rawal) is an egotistical and arrogant self-made Gujarati man who arrived from India and settled in New York. He started his career cleaning latrines and dirty clothes, then moved on to working in a restaurant, saving enough money to own one, and then finally owned twelve. He became an extremely successful real-estate magnate and was so big-headed that he started calling himself "THE Roger Patel." He married Kamla, and they were soon proud parents of two lovely daughters, Namrata and Ritu. When the girls are grown, the overprotective Roger arranges a marriage for Namrata with a property owner, a professional Patel man named Prem. Ritu Patel (Kim Sharma), a doctor, informs that she has met her soul mate also, Sunder Kapoor (Jimmy Sheirgill), who is part-Punjabi and part-Madrasi and is definitely not a Patel, nor a property owner, and not even a professional.

== Cast ==
- Jimmy Sheirgill as Sunder Kapoor
- Kim Sharma as Ritu Patel
- Paresh Rawal as Ranchhod Rai "The Roger" Patel
- Johnny Lever as Natwar
- Ranjeet as Immigration Officer
- Neena Kulkarni as Kamla Patel

== Soundtrack ==
Lyrics: Sameer

#	Title	Singer(s)
1	"Deewano Ko Pata Hai"	Udit Narayan, Sadhana Sargam
2	"Jaane Kab Anjaane"	Kumar Sanu, Kavita Krishnamurthy
3	"Dikri Amhari"	Udit Narayan, Poornima
4	"Aasman Se Chand Laoon"	Shaan
5	"Dhol Baje"	Udit Narayan, Kavita Krishnamurthy
6	"India Se Aaya"	Lalit Pandit
7	"India Se Aaya" II	Adnan Sami
8	"Life Is Beautiful" (Instrumental)	

== Reception ==
Sukanya Verma of Rediff.com wrote, "An inexperienced star cast, barring Rawal and Johnny Lever (minus his trademark funny oneliners), lack of crisp humor and engaging screenplay are some of the immediate flaws that go against KHDBB. This movie has everyone doing their own thing, almost". Taran Adarsh of Bollywood Hungama wrote, "The writers seem to have borrowed from the tried and tested stuff, which explains why the narrative does not hold your attention as the drama unfolds. Even the direction leaves a lot to be desired. The story telling is far from convincing". Kavitha K of Deccan Herald wrote, "The script is weak, the supporting cast flounders and the story is far-fetched, even by our filmi standards, so don’t expect Paresh Rawal to carry this one forward."
