= Mann (1999 film) =

1999 Indian film by Indra Kumar

- Film poster
- Directed by: Indra Kumar
- Written by: Aatish Kapadia
- Based on: An Affair to Remember by Leo McCarey
- Produced by: Indra Kumar; Ashok Thakeria
- Starring: Aamir Khan; Manisha Koirala; Anil Kapoor; Sharmila Tagore; Neeraj Vora
- Cinematography: Basha Lal
- Edited by: Hussain Burmawala
- Music by: Sanjeev–Darshan
- Production company: Maruti International
- Distributed by: Shemaroo Entertainment
- Release date: 9 July 1999
- Running time: 140 minutes
- Country: India
- Language: Hindi
- Budget: ₹14 crore
- Box office: ₹35.45 crore

Mann (transl. The Psyche) is a 1999 Indian Hindi-language romantic drama film written and directed by Indra Kumar. The film starred Aamir Khan and Manisha Koirala, pairing them for the second time, and also features Anil Kapoor, Sharmila Tagore and Neeraj Vora with Rani Mukerji in a special appearance. This is the second collaboration between Khan and Koirala since Akele Hum Akele Tum (1995). The film is mainly based on the 1957 American film An Affair To Remember. Mann received positive reviews upon release. The soundtrack by Sanjeev–Darshan has been well received but criticised for allegedly plagiarising other songs.

== Plot ==
Dev Karan Singh (Aamir Khan), a Casanova and ambitious painter deep in debt, agrees to marry Anita (Deepti Bhatnagar), the daughter of Singhania (Dalip Tahil), a rich tycoon. Priya (Manisha Koirala), a music teacher for children, is engaged to Raj (Anil Kapoor), She has agreed to marry him because he helped her when she was in need. Priya and Dev meet on a cruise. Dev becomes fond of Priya. He is a fun-loving, flamboyant Casanova. He tries to get close to her. Initially unimpressed, she later falls in love with him. However, as they were both already engaged to other people, they agreed to sort things out and meet on Valentine's Day in six months' time to get married.

Over the next six months, Dev calls off his engagement to Anita and starts working hard. Driven by his love for her, he creates and auctions off beautiful paintings, becoming very successful with the support of his friend Natu (Neeraj Vora). Meanwhile, Priya realises that leaving Raj would be wrong, and sadly writes a letter to Dev explaining everything. However, Raj receives the letter instead and supports Priya, convincing her to go to Dev. However, things take a turn for the worse when Priya is hit by a car on her way to meet Dev and has to have her legs amputated. Dev, who has been waiting all night for Priya, believes that she has rejected him because he does not know about the accident. Priya forbids Raj from telling Dev the truth, not wanting to become a burden to him. Now, Priya runs a music academy for young children.

Although heartbroken, Dev continues his career as a painter and goes on to become famous. One day, Priya attends one of his art exhibitions and wishes to buy a painting, a sentimental picture of her speaking to his beloved grandmother, whom Dev had introduced her to during the cruise. Dev said that he wouldn't sell the painting because it was intended for Priya. However, upon hearing that the girl who wanted it understood the emotion behind the picture and was disabled, he told the exhibition host to give the painting to her for free.

One day, he meets Priya and Raj at a theatre gathering, but Priya again forbids Raj from telling the truth. He visits Priya to give her an anklet that his recently deceased grandmother had wanted her to have when she became Dev's bride. Initially unaware of Priya's condition, Dev realises the truth when he remembers giving the painting to a disabled girl, only to find the same painting in another room. The two embrace tearfully, and Dev assures Priya that he will love her no matter what. Raj then marries Dev and Priya, and Dev carries Priya around the wedding ceremony in front of Nattu and the children from the Music Academy.

== Cast ==
- Aamir Khan as Dev Karan Singh
- Manisha Koirala as Priya Verma
- Anil Kapoor as Raj (Special Appearance)
- Sharmila Tagore as Suhana Devi Singh
- Rani Mukerji in song "Kali Nagin Ke Jaisi" (guest appearance)
- Neeraj Vora as Nattu
- Deepti Bhatnagar as Anita Singhania
- Dalip Tahil as Pratap Rai Singhania
- Shama Sikander as Kamini
- Satyen Kappu as Raj's uncle
- Anant Mahadevan as Creditor
- Mushtaq Khan as TV Reporter
- Paresh Ganatra
- Sheela Sharma
- Pappu Polyester as Dev's friend
- Sanjay Goradia
- Ketki Dave as Madhu
- Sumona Chakravarti as Neha
- Zoya Afroz as school child

== Soundtrack ==
The soundtrack was "composed" by the duo Sanjeev–Darshan, while the lyrics were by Sameer Anjaan. Most of the tracks were allegedly plagiarised from other artists' songs without crediting them. "Nasha Yeh Pyar Ka" is based on the melody of "L'Italiano" by the Italian singer Toto Cutugno, "Tinak Tin Tana" is lifted from "Yang Sedang Sedang Saja" by the Malaysian singer Iwan, "Chaha Hai Tujhko" is based on the Tamil song "Edho Oru Paatu" composed by S. A. Rajkumar from Unnidathil Ennai Koduthen (1998), "Khushiyan Aur Gham" was lifted from "Come Vorrei" by the Italian pop group Ricchi e Poveri, and "Kali Nagin Ke Jaisi" was lifted from "Ya Rayah" by the Algerian singer Dahmane El Harrachi. The first 40 seconds of "Kehna Hai Tumse" were sampled from "Liquid" by Jars of Clay. According to the Indian trade website Box Office India, with around 2,800,000 units sold the soundtrack became the sixth highest-selling album of the year.

Vocals for Aamir Khan were supplied by Udit Narayan.

Track listing
No.	Title	Singer(s)	Length
1.	"Mera Mann"	Udit Narayan & Alka Yagnik	4:40
2.	"Chaaha Hai Tujhko"	Udit Narayan & Anuradha Paudwal	4:25
3.	"Nasha Yeh Pyar Ka"	Udit Narayan	5:24
4.	"Tinak Tin Tana"	Udit Narayan & Alka Yagnik	4:19
5.	"Kehna Hai Tumse"	Udit Narayan & Hema Sardesai	4:40
6.	"Kyun Chupate Ho"	Udit Narayan & Anuradha Paudwal	4:58
7.	"Khushiyan Aur Gham"	Udit Narayan & Anuradha Paudwal	5:11
8.	"Kali Nagin Ke Jaisi"	Udit Narayan & Kavita Krishnamurthy	4:44
9.	"Tumhare Bagair Jeena Kya" (Dialogue)	Aamir Khan	1:47
10.	"Dance Music"	Instrumental	2:46
Total length:			42:19
