= Indrani Dasgupta =

Indian model and television presenter

Indrani Dasgupta.
- Born: 7 May 1983 (age 43); Muscat, Oman
- Citizenship: Indian
- Occupations: model, television presenter
- Spouse: Karan Paul
- Modeling information
- Height: 5 ft 9 in (1.75 m)
- Hair color: Black
- Eye color: Black

Indrani Dasgupta is an Indian model and television presenter. She has worked on advertising campaigns for brands like Reebok, Lakmé and Allen Solly.

== Early life and education ==
Raised in Muscat in a Bengali family of engineers, Dasgupta studied at Indian School Muscat (Darsait) & Delhi Public School, R. K. Puram. After her schooling she did her B.A. Economics Honours from Miranda House, University of Delhi, followed by M.A in Economics from Jawaharlal Nehru University in 2004.

== Career ==
An aspiring lawyer, she ventured into the modelling industry at the age of 18, when while studying at Miranda House, she was spotted by designer Ashish Soni, who asked her walk ramp for his clothing line. This started her modelling career, however she continued her studies on the side.

Indrani has had stints as the brand ambassador of Lakmé and Allen Solly women's garments and has worked in five Lakme Fashion Weeks, besides appearing TV ad campaigns and print commercials for Airtel, LG, Parachute Oil, Panasonic, and Santro. She has also appeared in music videos, like rock band Euphoria's number "Kaise Bhoolegi Mera Naam" from the album Phir Dhoom (2000).

Indrani appears on runways of fashion like for Lakme Fashion Week, Wills lifestyle Fashion Week, Blender's Pride Fashion Week, etc.

She was awarded the Society Achiever's Award for glamour in 2002. In 2011, she co-hosted TV travel show, What's With Indian Men? along with actress Sugandha Garg, on Fox Traveller.

== Social Work ==
Indrani Dasgupta conducts women empowerment workshops and presentation sessions with NGOs.

== Personal life ==
Indrani Dasgupta was first married to Yzudhamanyu Sarkar. She is currently married to Karan Paul and lives in New Delhi. They have two kids Uma Kismat Paul And Kabir Anand Paul.
