= Josh Talks =

Indian media company

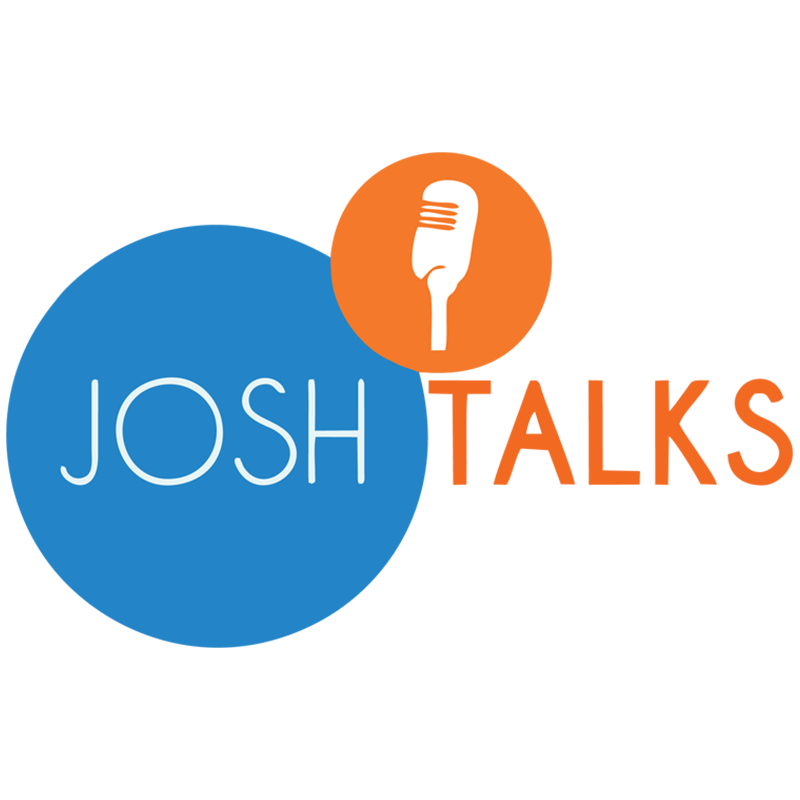
- Type: Private
- Industry: Media
- Founded: January 2015; 11 years ago
- Founder: Supriya Paul; Shobhit Banga
- Headquarters: Gurgaon
- Revenue: ▲₹190 million (US$2.0 million) (FY24)
- Net income: ▼₹−98.8 million (US$−1.0 million) (FY24)
- Website: joshtalks.com

Josh Talks is an Indian media platform headquartered in Gurugram, Haryana which hosts content in 10 languages. Josh Talks was awarded the National Media Award by Honorable President of India, Ram Nath Kovind and also featured in Forbes magazine 'Asia 30 Under 30' list for 2018.

== History ==
The company was founded in 2015 by Shobhit Banga and Supriya Paul. It is seed-funded by investors such as Ritesh Malik (Founder of Innov8), Sumit Ranka (Founder of Thinkpot) amongst other names in the Indian investor circuit.

Josh Talks began its journey with conferences in 2014 in Delhi and Bengaluru. The speakers were social activists, business leaders, entrepreneurs, scientists, academics, administrators, sportspeople, authors, musicians, actors and other artists.

The marquee Josh Talks LEAP 2016 took place October, featuring 24 speakers and 5,000 attendees. In August 2017, the company has been on the road with monthly conferences in various tier 2 cities across India.

Josh Talks on 27 February raised $1.5 million in pre-Series A funding round led by New York City-based Media Development Investment Fund (MDIF).

== Awards ==
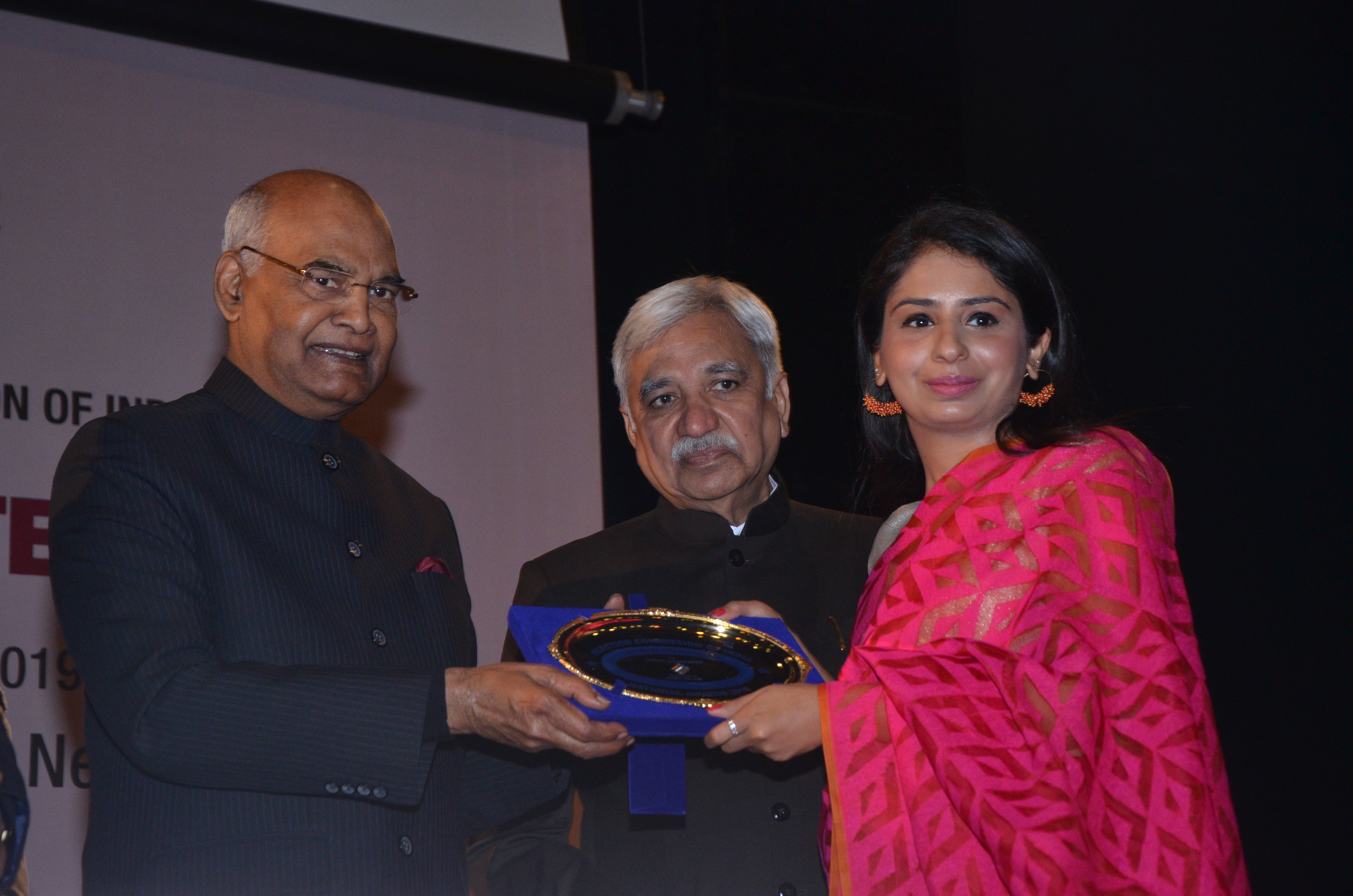
President Ramnath Kovind presenting National Media award to Josh Talks co-founder Supriya Paul

On 25 January 2019, Josh Talks was awarded the National Media Award by Honourable President of India, Ramnath Kovind for #MakeYourMark campaign to create awareness and engagement amongst the first time voters. The company was named in a list of "Top 50 Startups of India" for 2017 by Economic Times.

== Partners ==
Some of the major partners of Josh Talks are UN Women, United Nations Development Programme, ILO, DICCI, Indian Army, and among many others. One of Josh Talks' major partners is Facebook with whom they conduct conferences, workshops & bootcamps to encourage entrepreneurship in India.

The company's content can be found on YouTube, Facebook, iTunes, Saavn amongst other online platforms.

Josh has covered over 1,000+ speakers with over 8.93 Million subscribers on YouTube and 999,000+ fans on Facebook, and receives 20 Million views monthly.

== Speakers ==
Some of Josh Talks' speakers have been Boman Irani, Anurag Kashyap, Sonam Wangchuk, Laxmi Narayan Tripathi, Zeishan Quadri, Ritesh Agarwal Sanjay Kathuria and Ankur Warikoo.
