= Ila Pal Choudhury =

Indian politician and social worker

Ila Pal Choudhury (1908 – 9 March 1975) was an Indian Parliamentarian and nationalist social worker.

== Early life ==
Smt. Ila Pal Choudhury was born in a Brahmo family in Kolkata, British India. Her father Bijay Krishna Basu was the Superintendent of the Alipore Zoological Garden, Alipore. Ila married with Nadia's landlord Amiyanarayan Pal Choudhury. Her father-in-law Bipradas Pal Chowdhury was a Bengali industrialist of British India and man of modern concept. She entered politics and joined into the Indian National Congress of her young age.

== Political career ==
After joining the party Smt. Pal Choudhury met Netaji Subhas Chandra Bose and worked with him. She gradually became the leader of women's branch of the regional congress, Bengal. In 1957 Pal Choudhury won first time in the parliamentary election from the Nabadwip Lok Sabha constituency, Nadia district and became an active Member of Parliament, Lok Sabha. Afterwards she contested in the Bye election of Krishnanagar Lok Sabha constituency in 1968 and again won the seat. She was also involved with various social works like school establishment, welfare organisations etc.

== Death ==
Smt. Ila Pal Choudhury died on 9 March 1975.
