= Uma Vasudeva =

Indian writer and columnist

Uma Vasudeva (18 June 1931 – 27 March 2019) was an Indian writer and columnist. She was one of the early editors of India Today.

== Works ==
Her book Indira Gandhi: Revolution in Restraint covers Indira Gandhi's life from 1917 to 1971.

=== Novels ===
Her novels Song of Anusuya and Shreya of Sonagarh deal with the inner struggles of their woman protagonists. The main characters are portrayed as liberated women with their own surreptitious affairs. Song of Anusuya was noted to "probe deeply" into man–woman relationship. However, it was criticised by India Today as an unsuccessful foray into an alternative literary field by a writer who had presumably lost credibility in political writing following her publication of The Two Faces of Indira Gandhi. Shreya of Sonagarh, being of similar genre, invokes the theme of sex in relation to a woman's relationship with her husband and another lover. It describes the rise to political power of the protagonist, Shreya, a middle-class girl married into a princely family. It also deals with the connection between feudal lords and politics.

Vasudeva's depiction of feminism has been described as being Western-biased, rather than rooted in Indian soil.

== Bibliography ==
=== Fiction ===
- Song of Anusuya (1978)
- Shreya of Sonagarh (1993)

=== Non-fiction ===
- Indira Gandhi: Revolution in Restraint (1974)
- Two Faces of Indira Gandhi (1977)
- Courage Under Fire (2003)
