= Supriya Paul =

Indian Entrepreneur

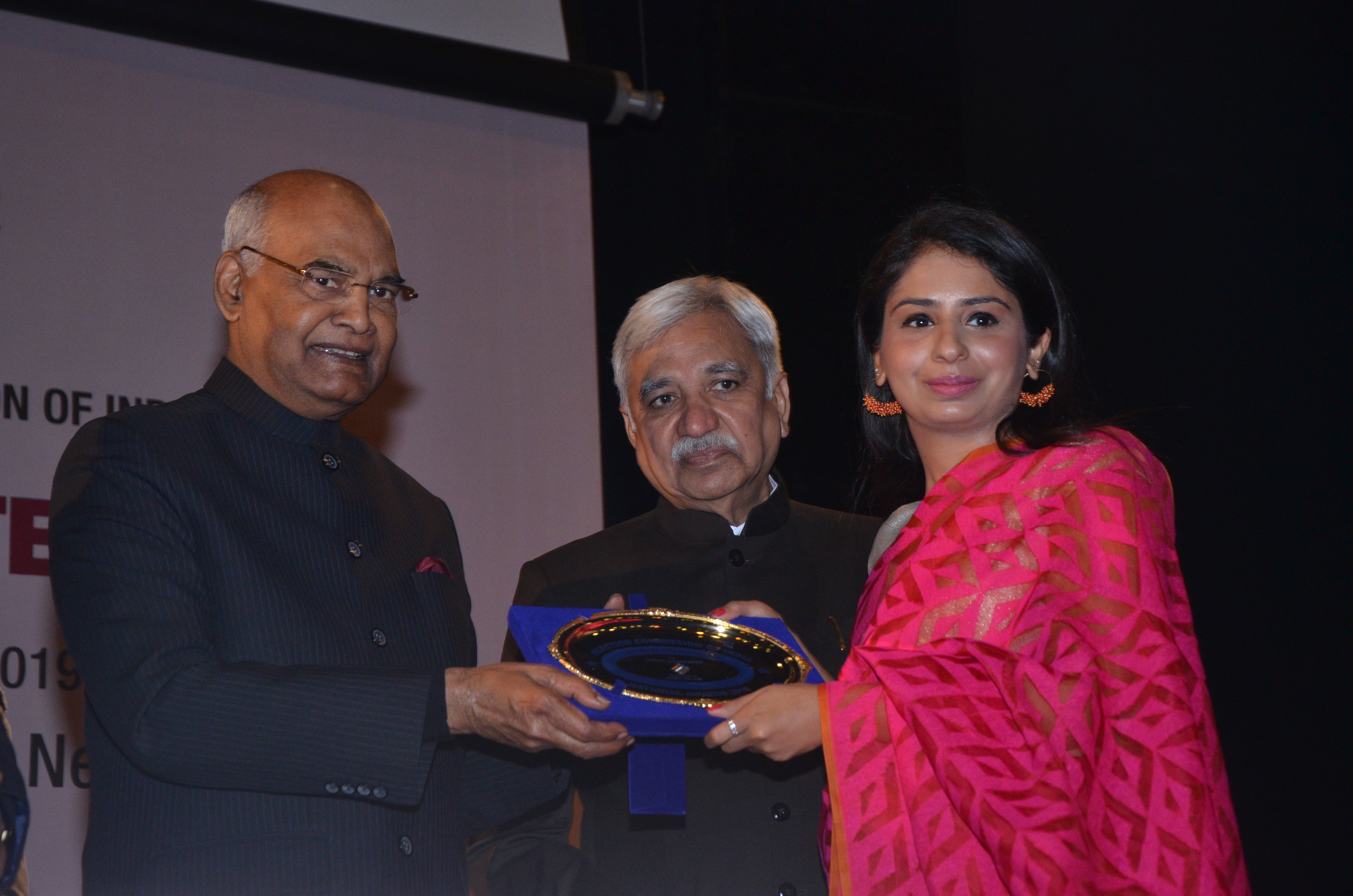
- Paul receiving National Media Award from President of India
- Born: 16 September 1993
- Citizenship: Indian
- Education: Sri Venkateswara College; Delhi University
- Occupations: Founder and CEO of Josh Talks

Supriya Paul (born 16 September 1993) is an Indian entrepreneur, the co-founder and CEO of Josh Talks. She has written a book, All You Need Is Josh: Stories of Courage and Conviction in 21st-century India.

== Early life and education ==
Paul studied at Sri Venkateswara College. She studied Hindustani classical music for 13 years.

== Career ==
Paul along with Shobhit Banga co-founded Josh Talks in January 2015. She has written a book, All You Need Is Josh: Stories of Courage and Conviction in 21st-century India.

== Books ==
- All You Need Is Josh: Stories of Courage and Conviction in 21st-century India

== Awards ==
- Asia 30 Under 30 list for 2018.
- SheThePeople Digital Women Award’17 for Best Content Creation
