= Sadhu Haridas =

Hindu yogi of nineteenth-century India

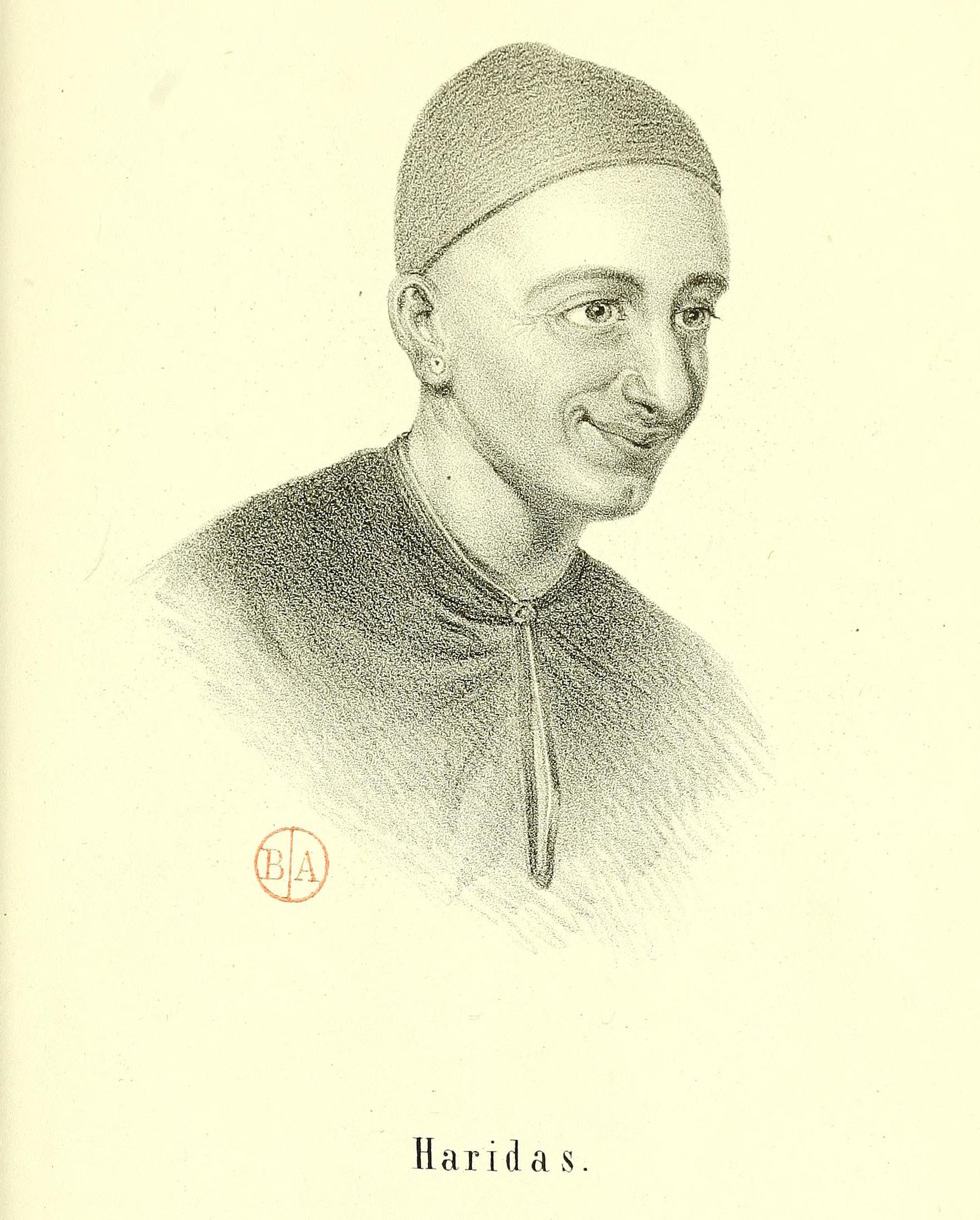
Sadhu Haridas

Sadhu Haridas (fl. 1837) was a Hindu yogi of nineteenth-century India, renowned for his reputed power to remain suspended in a deathlike state for extended periods of time without food or water. His most notable feat, carried out in 1837, was to survive burial underground, without food or water, for forty days. This event was recorded at the court of the Maharajah of the Punjab, Ranjit Singh, at Lahore, India (now in Pakistan).

== Survival of burial ==
In 1837, Haridas was allegedly buried in the presence of the Maharajah, his whole court, and French and British doctors. He adopted a sitting posture, and was covered over and sewn up in cerecloth. He was then placed inside a large wooden case, which was riveted closed and sealed with the Maharajah's own seal. The case was then lowered into a specially-constructed brick vault. Earth was piled upon the case, and a detachment of the Maharajah's guard was placed to keep watch over the vault; four sentries mounting guard over it by day, and eight by night. Forty days later, Haridas was disinterred in the presence of the Maharajah, his court, and the French and British doctors. His apparently lifeless body was washed with hot water, massaged, and ghee placed on his eyelids and tongue; in a short time, he had recovered.

According to Claude Wade, the British Resident at the Maharaja's court: "From the time of the box being opened to the recovery of the voice, not more than half an hour could have elapsed; and in another half-hour, the Fakir talked with myself and those about him freely, though feebly, like a sick person. Then we left him, convinced that there had been no fraud or collusion in the exhibition we had witnessed."

The report suggests hibernation as explanation and "regretted that no exact weights of Haridâs were noted before and after the burial". After a thirty day burial in 1835, two English officers "were struck by his greatly sunken abdomen".
