= Pehla Nasha =

1993 film by Ashutosh Gowariker

- Poster
- Directed by: Ashutosh Gowariker
- Written by: Neeraj Vora; Ashutosh Gowariker (Screenplay); Sanjay Chhel (Dialogues)
- Produced by: Mohammed A. Rahim; Viral Shah
- Starring: Deepak Tijori; Pooja Bhatt; Raveena Tandon
- Cinematography: Deep Pal
- Edited by: Javed Sayyed
- Music by: Uttankk V. Vora; Neeraj Vora
- Release date: 13 August 1993
- Running time: 131 minutes
- Country: India
- Language: Hindi

Pehla Nasha (transl. First intoxication [as in love]) is a 1993 Indian Hindi-language thriller film and the directorial debut film of Ashutosh Gowariker. The film is a remake of Brian de Palma's 1984 thriller Body Double. It stars Deepak Tijori, Pooja Bhatt, Raveena Tandon. The film also has cameo appearances by Aamir Khan, Sudesh Berry, Rahul Roy, Shah Rukh Khan, Juhi Chawla, and Saif Ali Khan as themselves.

It remains the only film to have Aamir Khan, Shah Rukh Khan, and Saif Ali Khan in a scene together along with Rahul Roy and Sudesh Berry. Upon release, the film received negative reviews and failed at the box office.

== Synopsis ==
A down-and-out actor, Deepak Bakshi, who has claustrophobia, goes to live as a caretaker at his friend's apartment while he is away. His friend shows him a telescope which is used for spying on a neighborhood building that houses a beautiful woman. Deepak takes to spying on a regular basis. One day while spying on the woman, Deepak sees her getting attacked. He decides to get involved and lands himself in trouble with the police as he is now a suspect for murder. Later he is able to solve the mystery by overcoming his phobia and catching the main killer.

== Cast ==
- Deepak Tijori as Deepak Bakshi
- Pooja Bhatt as Monica
- Raveena Tandon as Mrs. Avantika Bajaj
- Aruna Irani as Rekha Bajaj Avantika's mother.
- Paresh Rawal as Inspector Mazumdar
- Jalal Agha as Mahesh Ahuja
- Jayant Kripalani as Deepak's friend
- Amin Hajee as John
- Karim Hajee as Jack
- Makrand Deshpande
- Avtar Gill as Shakoor Bhai
- Aditya Lakhia
- Daya Shankar Pandey
- Jahangir Khan
- Shammi as Deepak's Landlady
- Anjan Srivastav as Interviewer
- Bobby Khan as Choreographer
- Sharad Sharma
- Sudesh Berry as himself
- Aamir Khan as himself
- Shahrukh Khan as himself
- Juhi Chawla as herself
- Rahul Roy as himself
- Saif Ali Khan as himself

== Songs ==
Anand Bakshi wrote all songs.

- "Aaj Raat Bas Mein (Part 1)" – Asha Bhosle
- "Mr. Zero Ban Gaya Hero" – Vinod Rathod
- "Nadiya Kinare" – Asha Bhosle, Vinod Rathod
- "Pyar Ki Raat" – Asha Bhosle, Vinod Rathod
- "Tu Hai Haseena" – Asha Bhosle, Vinod Rathod
- "Tum Kiss Liye Ho Bekarar" – Sadhana Sargam
