= Bipradas Pal Chowdhury =

Bengali industrialist (1857–1914)

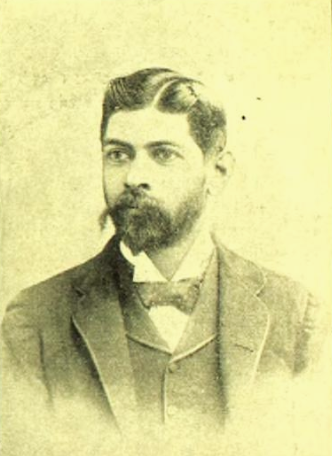
- Born: 1857; Maheshganj, Nadia district,Bengal Presidency, British India
- Died: 25 October 1914 (aged 56–57); London, United Kingdom
- Occupation: Industrialist

Bipradas Pal Chowdhury (1857 – 25 October 1914) was a Bengali industrialist and distinguished landlord. His daughter in law Smt. Ila Pal Choudhury was the Member of Parliament, Lok Sabha and nationalist politician.

== Career ==
Pal Chowdhury was born at Maheshganj in Nadia district in British India. His father was prominent Zamindar Madhusudan Pal Chowdhury. He completed F.A from the Presidency College Calcutta in 1873 and went to England for studying civil engineering. Returning from England, Pal Chowdhury made factories of brass and a tannery. He was interested to produce Swadeshi articles and took part in independent capitalist development in Bengal. After that he entered in Tea business and form Gayabari Tea estate near Darjeeling competing with British businessmen. He was a man of modern, enlightened concept. Pal Chowdhury also donated lots of land for expansion of railway line in Nadia.

== Death ==
Bipradas Pal Chowdhury died in 1914 in London. A polytechnic college, Bipradas Pal Chowdhury Institute of Technology was named after him at Krishnanagar.
