= Haridas Siddhanta Bagish =

Indian writer and translator

Haridas Siddhanta Vagish
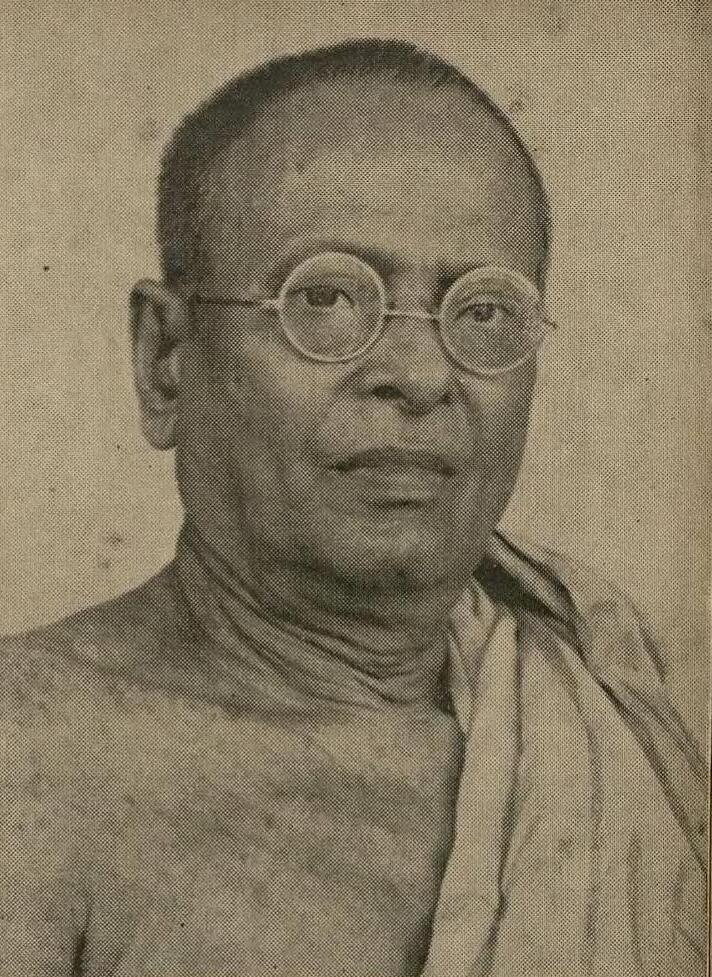
- Born: 22 October 1876; West Bengal, India
- Died: 26 December 1961 (aged 85)
- Occupations: Writer, Translator
- Known for: Bengali translations of Indian epics and classics
- Awards: 1960 Padma Bhushan

4990010020426 - Abhigyan Shakuntalam Ed.2, Bhattacharya, Haridas Siddhanta Bagish, 666p, Literature, Sanskrit (1860)

Haridas Siddhanta Vagish was an Indian writer, translator of Bengali literature, and Sanskrit scholar. He translated several Indian epics and classics into Bengali language which included the Mahabharata, Shakuntala and Meghadūta. In recognition of his contributions, the Government of India honored him with the Padma Bhushan, the third highest civilian award in the country, in 1960.

== See also ==
- Kalidasa
- Vyasa
