= Malakar =

- Religions: Hinduism
- Languages: Bengali
- Populated states: Bangladesh, West Bengal, Tripura
- Family names: Malakar

Malakar (Bengali: মালাকার) is a Bengali Hindu surname spread throughout West Bengal and Bangladesh and also in some parts of Assam, Jharkhand and Tripura. Malakars are traditionally garlanders by trade. They are one of the fourteen castes belonging to 'Nabasakh' group of Bengal.

== Origin ==
Malakars lived around Dhaka and other smaller towns of Bengal. The origin of the word Malakar came from Sanskrit. It is a Sandhi of mala and akar, which means a person who shapes mala, i.e. a garlander.

== People with the surname ==
- Bijoy Malakar, Indian politician
- Bishnu Malakar (born 1959), Nepalese boxer
- Sanjaya Malakar (born 1989), American singer
- Shrabonti Malakar (born 1987), Indian actress
