= Jitendra Chandra Paul =

- Born: 1914; Brahmanbaria, Bengal Presidency, British India
- Died: 12 September 2014 (aged 101); Agartala, Tripura, India
- Citizenship: India
- Occupations: Freedom fighter, Journalist, Author
- Known for: Role in Indian independence movement, Founder of Jagaran ( daily newspaper)

Jitendra Chandra Paul, (also known as Jiten Paul or J. C. Paul); (1914-2014), was an Indian Bengali freedom fighter, journalist and author from Agartala, Tripura.

== Life ==
He was born into a Bengali family in British India (now Brahmanbaria, Comilla, Bangladesh) in 1914. He was jailed for many years for participating in the Indian independence movement. He founded Tripura's first Bengali language daily newspaper Jagaran in 1954. He wrote more than 10 books. He died on 12 September 2014 in Agartala, Tripura.
