= Aruna Vasudev =

Indian scholar and film critic (1936–2024)

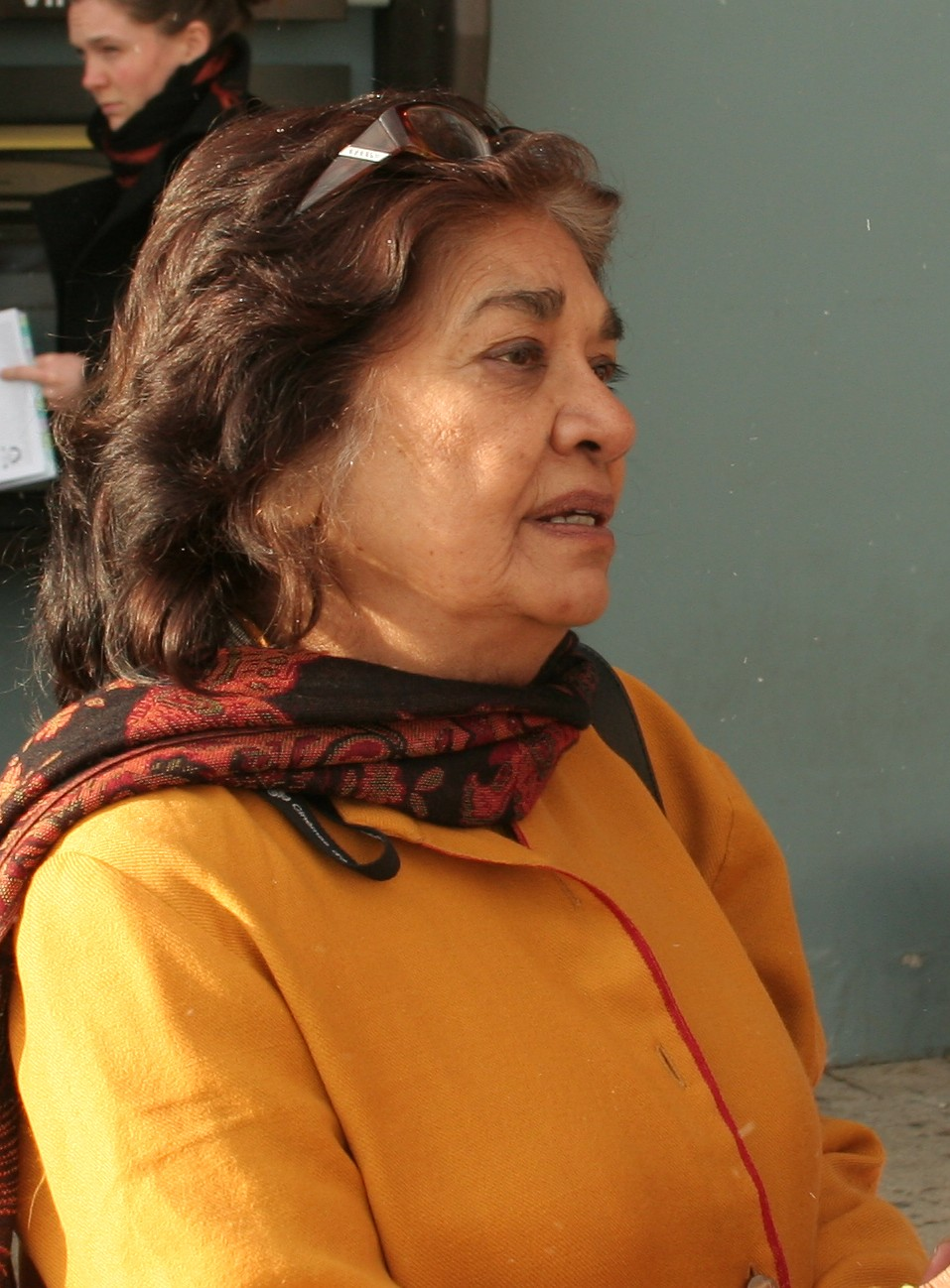
- Vasudev in 2010
- Born: 1 November 1936
- Died: 5 September 2024 (aged 87)
- Spouse: Sunil Roy (died 1993)
- Children: One

Aruna Vasudev (1 November 1936 – 5 September 2024) was an Indian critic, author, editor, painter, and maker of documentaries who was considered an eminent scholar on Asian cinema, and was described as the "mother of Asian Cinema".

== Early life and education ==
A younger sister of Uma Vasudeva, she was born in 1936. After marrying Sunil Kumar Roy, an Indian diplomat, she chose to retain her maiden name.

His Excellency Sunil Roy died in New York from cancer in 1993, having previously served as Indian Ambassador to Poland, then Mexico, and High Commissioner to Nigeria.

In the early 1960s, she attended film classes in New York where her father was working and created a number of short documentaries after her return to India. She received a doctorate from the University of Paris on cinema and censorship. Her PhD thesis was published as a book titled Liberty and Licence in the Indian Cinema in 1979.

== Career ==
Vasudev recently served as director of Osian's-Connoisseurs of Art Private Limited. She was also one of the Trustees of the Public Service Broadcasting Trust in India.

She started as a greenhorn helping in the makeup rooms of Doordarsan in 1960.

She launched Cinemaya in 1988 as a publication that showcases filmmakers from Asia. In 1991, she founded the internationally renowned NETPAC as an organisation to forward the cause of Asian films.

From 1990, she was the President or Jury Member of international film festivals including Karlovy Vary, Locarno, Cannes (Camera d'Or), Las Palmas, Pusan, Singapore, Fajr (Tehran), and Antalya.

== Death ==
On 5 September 2024, it was announced that Vasudev had died at the age of 87.

== Honours and awards ==
=== Honours ===
Appointed Cavaliere della Stella della Solidarietà Italiana in 2004, in 2019 Vasudev was honoured by the French Government as Officier des Arts et des Lettres, the highest accolades from two major film-producing countries, Italy and France.

=== Awards ===
In 1997, Vasudev won the Korean Cinema Award at the Pusan International Film Festival.

In 2006, Vasudev received a Lifetime Achievement Award at the Cinemanila International Film Festival.

In 2015, Vasudev was honored with a Lifetime Achievement Award at the 2nd edition of the International Film Festival of Colombo for her contributions towards putting Asian cinema on the international map. At the Hawaii International Film Festival the same year, Vasudev won a Vision in Film Award.

The Tripoli Film Festival has named its prize for Best Writing on Cinema as the “Aruna Vasudev Award”.

== Media ==
=== Film ===
In 2021, a documentary titled Aruna Vasudev: Mother of Asian Cinema was released by filmmaker Supriya Suri. The film explores the legacy created by Vasudev's work and the impact it made on Asian cinema
