= Colin Pal =

Hindi actor, technician, journalist, and publicist

Colin Pal (25 December 1923 – 30 August 2005) was a Hindi film actor, technician, journalist, and publicist on 175 Hindi films. He was the son of producer Niranjan Pal and the grandson of Indian independence movement activist Bipin Chandra Pal. Pal was born in London to an English mother, Lily Bell, and spent his early years in Wembley before moving to Bombay in 1929.

Pal joined Filmistan Studios in May 1943 as an apprentice after working alongside his father at Bombay Talkies. He became the assistant director to P.L. Santoshi. While working with Filmistan, he also portrayed Netaji Subashchandra Bose in Samaadhi (1949). In 1951 he appeared in Bimal Roy's Parineeta and Naukri. He later directed Shrimatijee, Naina, and Suhag Sindoor for Munshi productions.

Pal spent most of his career as a publicist for mainstream Hindi films but also wrote for several trade magazines. He frequently collaborated with film historians on projects around the early talkie studios in Bombay. He contributed to the historical discussion on the use of simple Hindustani in early Hindi cinema instead of the more literary language, which is common in other vernacular cinema including Tamil and Bengali. According to Bhagwan Das Garga Pal argued that this was driven by the early screenwriters and producers in Bombay being transplants from the silent era, who were not Hindi speakers themselves, and consequently insisted on dialogue that was very straightforward contemporary language.

He authored the book Shooting Stars which described the eccentricities of the cinema process. His reworking of his father's autobiography Aye Jibon: Such is life won a National Award from the Indian government in 2001.

Pal died on 28 August 2005 after a prolonged illness in Mumbai at the age of 83. His son, Deep Pal, was a pioneer of Steadicam camerawork in India.

== Works ==
- Shooting Stars, Screen World Pub, ISBN 81-900258-7-2.
- Aye Jibon: Such is life
