= Haridaspur, Bangladesh =

Haridaspur
- town
- Interactive map of Haridaspur
- Coordinates: 23°01′50″N 89°48′45″E
- Country: Bangladesh
- Time zone: UTC+6 (BST)

Haridaspur is a village located in Gopalganj Sadar Upazila of Gopalganj District, Bangladesh.

== See also ==
- List of villages in Bangladesh
