= Cinemaya =

Indian film magazine

- Cover of issue 59, Summer 2003
- Editor: Aruna Vasudev
- Categories: Asian cinema
- Frequency: Quarterly
- Publisher: Aruna Vasudev
- First issue: October 1988
- Country: India
- Based in: New Delhi
- Language: English
- ISSN: 0970-8782

Cinemaya (a blend of cinema and maya (illusion)) is a film magazine established in 1988 devoted exclusively to coverage of Asian film. It is published in New Delhi, India, and distributed internationally. The present editor-in-chief of Cinemaya is Aruna Vasudev, noted film journalist. Its goals are to promote Asian filmmaking internationally and to help Asian national cinemas gain wider international recognition.

In 1990, in collaboration with UNESCO it founded the Network for the Promotion of Asian Cinema, an association of film professionals based in Singapore which presents annual awards for greatest Asian achievements in filmmaking at selected film festivals around the world.

Cinefan or Cinemaya Festival of Asian Cinema, now known as Osian's Cinefan Festival of Asian and Arab Cinema, began in 1999 as an outgrowth of Cinemaya, and was later taken over by the Osian's Connoisseurs of Art of Neville Tuli
