= The Park Hotels =

Indian boutique hotel chain

Apeejay Surrendra Park Hotels Ltd.
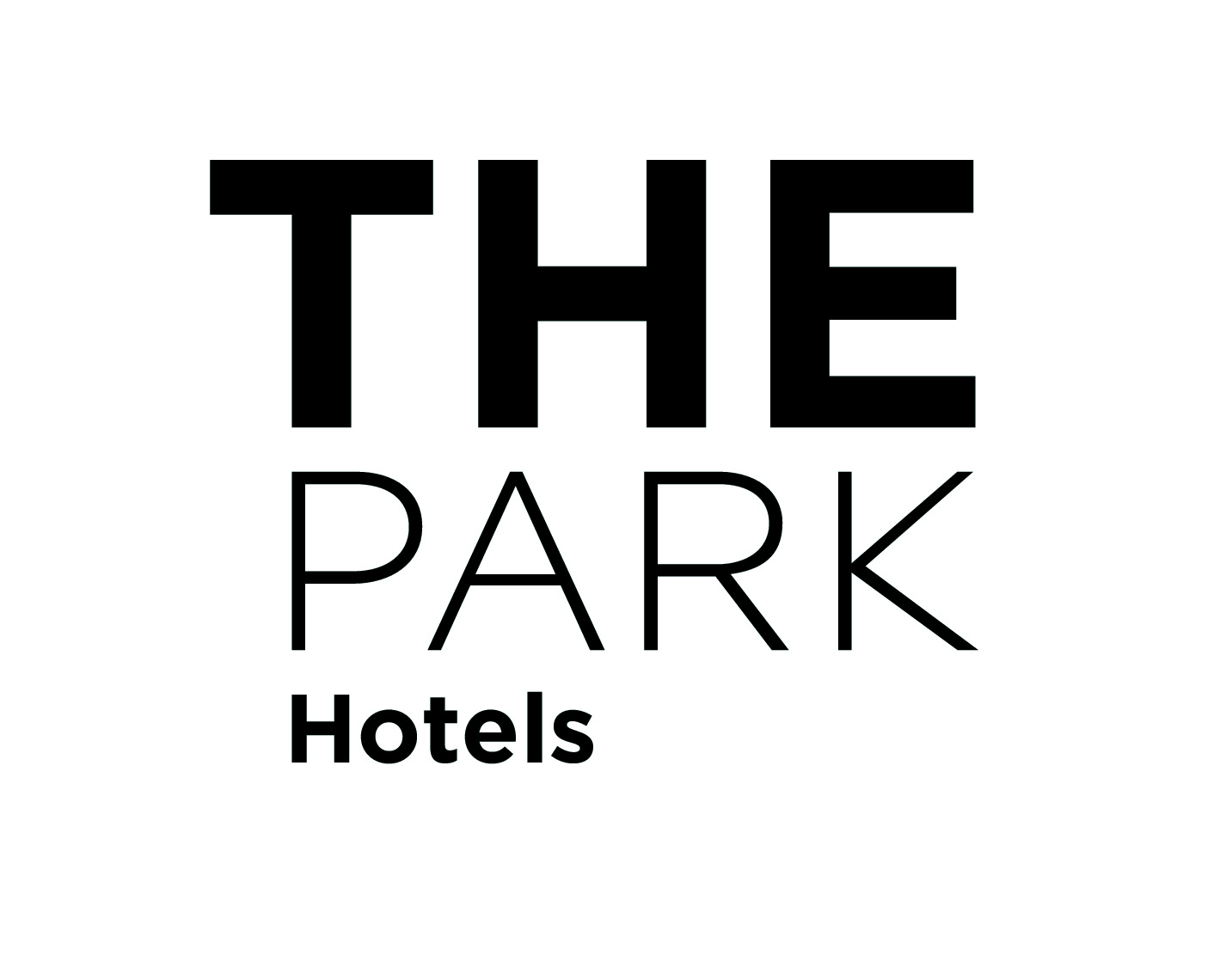
- Type: Public
- Traded as: NSE: PARKHOTELS; BSE: 544111
- Industry: Hospitality
- Founded: 1 November 1967; 58 years ago
- Founder: Surrendra Paul
- Headquarters: Kolkata, West Bengal, India,
- Number of locations: 30
- Area served: India, Taiwan, South Korea, Mongolia, Japan, Indonesia, Thailand, Philippines, Vietnam, Malaysia, Uzbekistan, Saudi Arabia, Kazakhstan, UAE, Brazil, Bahrain, Israel, Kuwait, Fiji, Sri Lanka, Nepal, Qatar, Oman, South Africa, Nigeria, Kenya, Tanzania, Ghana, Egypt and Trinidad and Tobago
- Key people: Priya Paul (chairperson); Vijay Dewan (managing director)
- Products: Hotels and resorts
- Parent: Apeejay Surrendra Group
- Website: theparkhotels.com

The Park Hotels is a chain of contemporary luxury five-star boutique hotels in India belonging to the Apeejay Surrendra Group, headquartered in Kolkata. It comprises 30 hotels, including owned and leased, in 20 cities across four brands—The Park, The Park Collection, Zone by the Park and Zone Connect by the Park.

== History ==
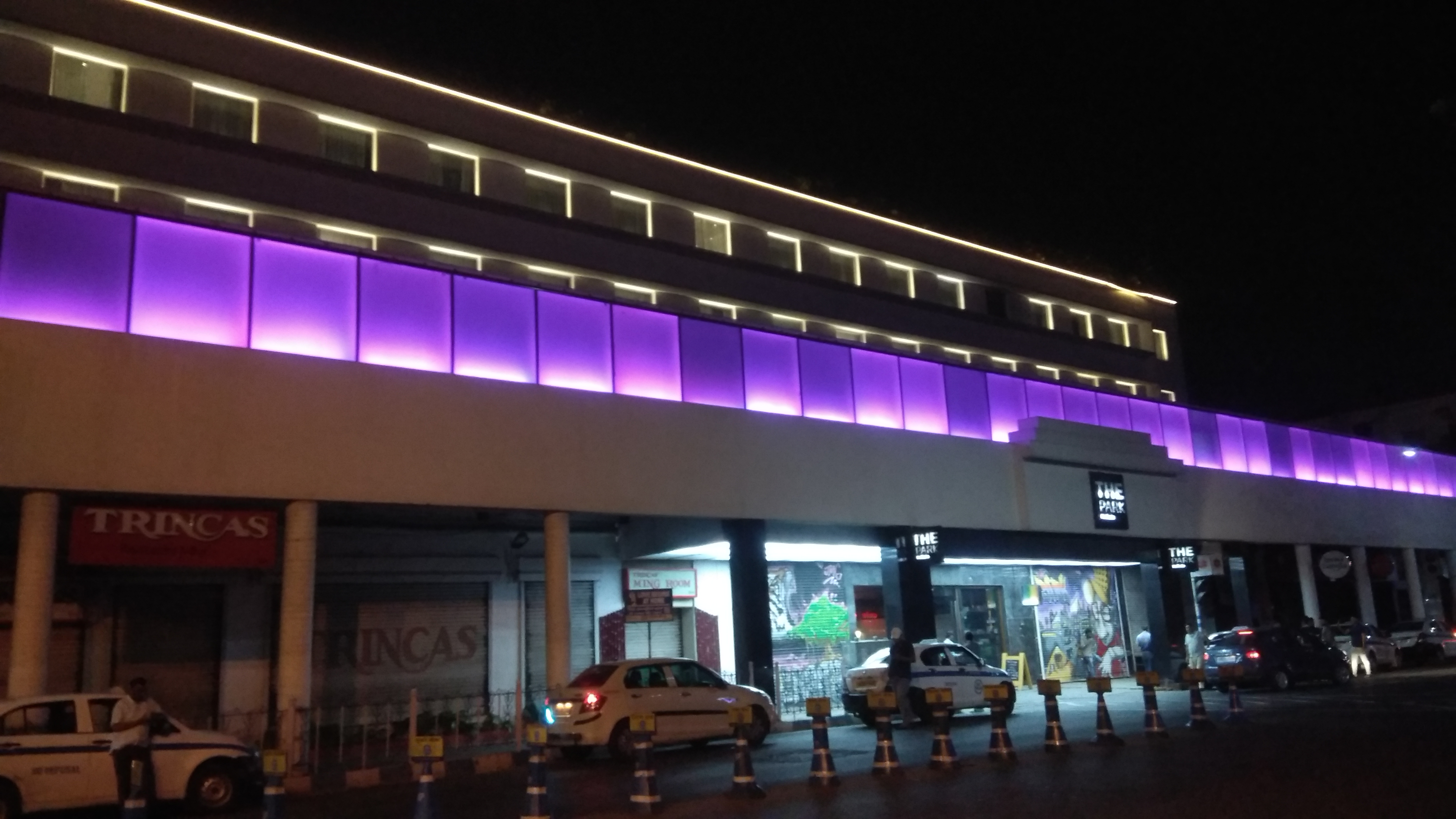
The Park Hotel Kolkata on Park Street

The hotel business was started by Surrendra Paul in 1967, with the opening of the group's first hotel, The Park, a 150-room hotel on the fashionable Park Street in Kolkata, on 1 November; the hotel at Visakhapatnam was added in 1968, while The Park New Delhi commenced operations in 1987.

After the death of Surrendra Paul, his daughter Priya Paul succeeded him in 1990. Subsequently, The Park Bangalore was added in 2000, while The Park Chennai was commissioned in 2002. The Park Bangalore was designed by Terence Conran.

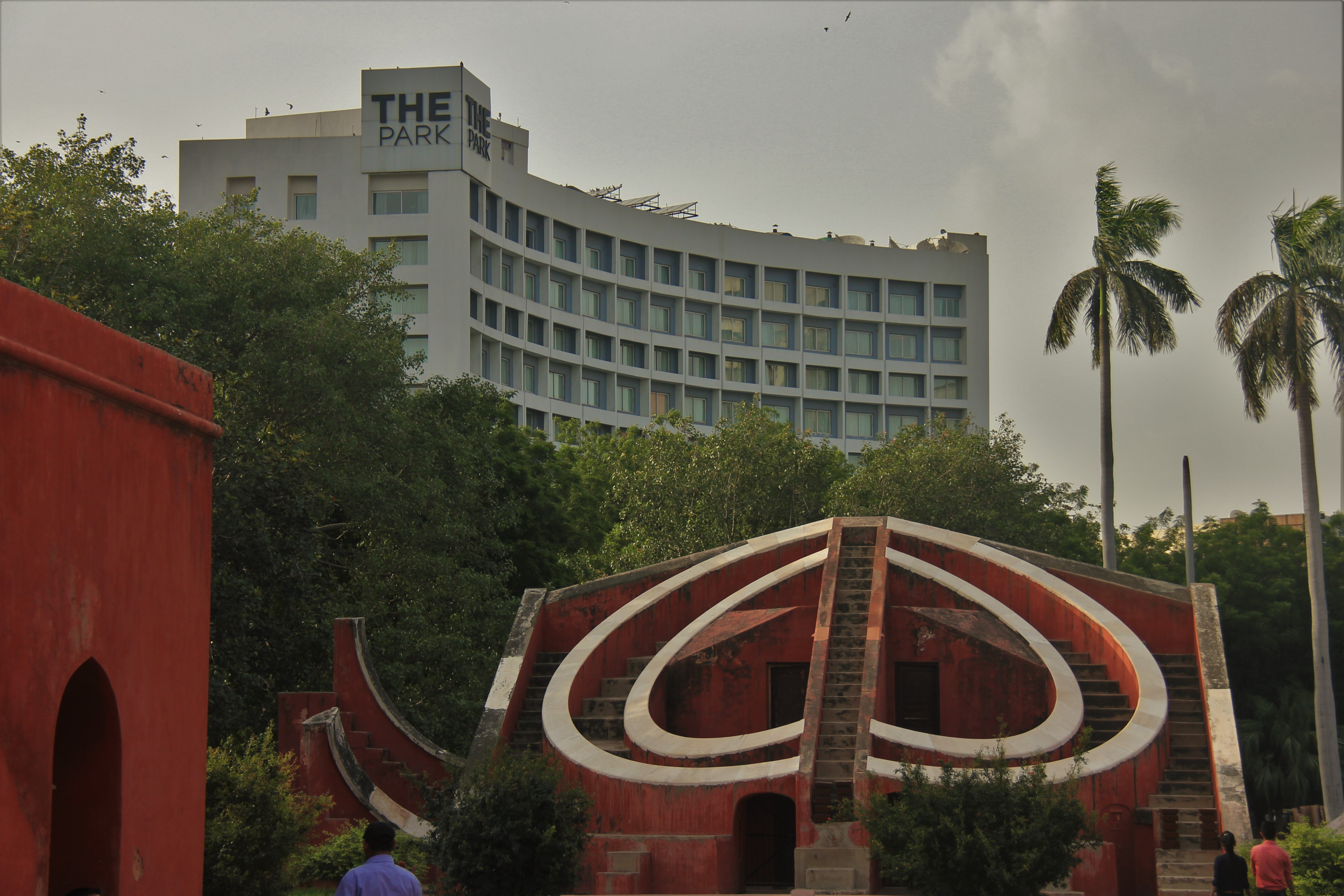
The Park Hotel in Delhi with Jantar Mantar in front.

The Park New Delhi took up the restoration of the 1724 built astronomical observatory, Jantar Mantar, in 2000, after an MoU with the Archaeological Survey of India (ASI).

== List of hotels ==
	City/location	Hotel name	Rooms	Opening year
1	Bangalore	The Park, Bangalore	109	1999
2	Chennai	The Park, Chennai	215	2002
3	Goa	The Park Calangute, Goa	30	2011
4	Goa	The Park Baga River, Goa	30	2011
5	Hyderabad	The Park, Hyderabad	268	2010
6	Jodhpur	Zone - by The Park, Jodhpur	90	2017
7	Kolkata	The Park, Kolkata	200	1967
8	Navi Mumbai	The Park, Navi Mumbai	80	2007
9	Mumbai	The Park, Mumbai	60	2019
10	New Delhi	The Park, New Delhi	220	1987
11	Raipur	Zone - by The Park, Raipur	185	2018
12	Visakhapatnam	The Park, Visakhapatnam	66	1980
13	Jaipur	Zone - by The Park, Jaipur	48	2014
14	Kolkata	Zone - by The Park, Kolkata	116	2003
15	Patiala	Ran Baas The Palace Hotel	35	2022

== Recognition ==
The Park Kolkata was awarded the "National Tourism Award" (2003–04) for outstanding performance as the Best Boutique Hotel in the country by the Department of Tourism, Government of India. The Park Kolkata won The Best Business Hotel award at Travel+ leisure India south Asia's luxury travel event 'India's Best Awards 2018' in New Delhi

In 2006, Forbes, listed "Atrium" in The Park Chennai, with its menu designed by Italian chef Antonio Carluccio, amongst India's top 10 Most Expensive Restaurants. In 2010, The Independent, listed The Park Hyderabad amongst its list of "100 holiday ideas for 2010".
