= Osian's Cinefan Festival of Asian and Arab Cinema =

Annual film festival

Coordinates: 28.613889°N 77.208889°E

Osian's-Cinefan was one of Asia's leading film festivals devoted to Asian and Arab cinema, and was part of Osian's Film House Division. The festival celebrated its 10th anniversary in July 2008. After a two-year break, the 12th staging of the festival took place in July 2012. It has been discontinued since.

== History ==
Cinefan began in 1999 as an outgrowth of Cinemaya, a quarterly Asian cinema magazine published in New Delhi since 1988. The festival was launched with 27 films presented by the Network for the Promotion of Asian Cinema (NETPAC) and supported by the government of Delhi. The focus that first year was on cinema of Japan as well as the 30th anniversary of the Indian New Wave with a selection of films by New Wave directors.

=== 10th Osian's-Cinefan ===
Osian's-Cinefan, the 10th festival of Asian and Arab cinema was held in New Delhi from 10–20 July 2008. The main focus was the relationship between writing and cinema, which was explored through film screenings and seminars. This section, comprising novels in adaptation, will be the basis of a new literary festival, introduced at Osian's-Cinefan for the first time.

Girish Kasaravalli's Kannada movie Gulabi Talkies gained the best Indian film award at the festival, and Umashree won the Best actress award for the same film. Osian's Lifetime Achievement Award for Contribution to Cinema instituted that year was awarded to eminent filmmaker Mrinal Sen. Aruna Vasudev Lifetime Achievement Award for Writing on Cinema was conferred on Jose "Pete" F. Lacaba.

=== 2012 Osian's-Cinefan Festival ===
At the 2012 Osian Cinefan Festival, held in August 2012, Hindi film B.A. Pass won the Best Film Award in Indian competition section, while Shadab Kamal won the Best Actor award.

== Sections ==
=== Competition ===
Asian and Arab: Asian and Arab films made between May 2007 and April 2008

Indian Competition: Indian films made between May 2007 and April 2008

First Features: First features by Asian, Arab or Indian directors made between May 2007 and April 2008

In-Tolerance: A competitive section, it includes feature and documentary films that respond to or deal with the intolerance of our times, intolerance of the other, of differences, deviations and departures.

=== Out of competition ===
Frescoes: New films from Asian and Arab countries that showcase the richness and diversity of their cinemas

Indian Mosaic: New films from India

Cross-Cultural Encounters: Films that show a cross-cultural connection between Asian, Arab and other cultures

Filmcraft: Screenplay (World Cinema): Films chosen with a view to opening a debate on whether the screenplay is a necessary evil and whether the verbal document called the screenplay can presage the living reality of images and sound in cinema

Films from Israel and Palestine: A glimpse of Israeli and Palestinian cinema 60 years after U.N. partition of Palestine

Writing and Cinema: The novel in adaptation and tribute to Naguib Mahfouz.

Springboard: A Tribute to Osian's-Cinefan

The Ten Commandments (World Cinema): Celebrating the significance of the number 10 on the occasion of the festival's 10th anniversary. The films explore the manner in which cinema has navigated the narrow alley between censorship, transgression and pleasure throughout its history.

A New Focus: Short fiction films of less than 40 minutes duration from Asian, Indian or Arab countries.

Retrospectives and Tributes

== Talent Campus India #5 2008 ==
Osian's-Cinefan announced the 5th edition of Talent Campus India organised in collaboration with Berlinale Talent Campus, Berlin International Film Festival and Max Mueller Bhavan, New Delhi. Talent Campus is a six-day workshop where up to 30 young aspiring filmmakers will be invited from India, neighbouring South Asian countries, and Iran to New Delhi to interact with renowned filmmakers and film professionals from India and abroad. The aim of the workshop is to provide youth a forum for learning and sharing the process of filmmaking.
