= Haridas Pal =

Fictional Bengali character

In-universe information
- Full name: Haridas Pal
- Nickname: Haridas
- Gender: Male
- Religion: Hindu
- Origin: Bengal

Haridas Pal (Bengali: হরিদাস পাল) is a fictional Bengali character known for his greatness, stature and grandeur. He is a person who is highly respected in the society for his noble thoughts and deeds and therefore commands authority over the mass. Any such highly influential person is referred to as Haridas Pal.

The Bengali phrase Tumi Kon Haridas Pal? (Bengali: তুমি কোন হরিদাস পাল?) literally meaning "Which Haridas Pal are you?" is often used to question his credentials when someone tries to exert his authority over matters which are apparently beyond his sphere of influence. Through this question he is bluntly told that he doesn't belong to the stature of Haridas Pal and therefore his questioning and suggestions are unwelcome. Later an alternative phrase Ke Tumi Haridas Pal? (Bengali: কে তুমি হরিদাস পাল?) literally meaning "Who are you Haridas Pal?" also began to be used to address the second person as Haridas Pal himself and dismiss him as a non-entity. Usage of such phrase began to alternatively define Haridas Pal as someone who is suffering from illusory superiority or delusions of greatness and grandeur. Through years of misuse of the corrupted alternative the name Haridas Pal has alternatively become an expression of contempt and mockery.

== Origin ==
According to one theory, the name derives from that of a real person who hailed from a poor family of Rishra but subsequently overcame poverty to become a successful businessman in Kolkata in the first half of the 20th century. Haridas was born to Netaicharan Pal in a Gandhabanik family in the year 1876. In 1892, he moved to Kolkata where he worked in a goldsmith's shop and lived in poverty. Fortune struck him when he inherited his maternal uncle's property. He set up a business in glasses and lanterns in Burrabazar, Kolkata and subsequently expanded it to Guwahati. He brought four palatial houses, set up a charitable trust and founded a school. He died in 1933 due to kidney failure. In 1965, the Kolkata Municipal Corporation renamed College Lane to Haridas Pal Lane in his memory.

According to another theory, Haridas Pal hailed from Haripur village in eastern Bengal, now in Bangladesh. He lived in the 19th century. Apparently he was a wealthy person who later moved to Kolkata, where he squandered all his wealth and ruined himself. The archetypal name derives from the name of this person.

== See also ==
- Ad Hominem
- Average Joe
- Dunning–Kruger effect
- Superiority complex
