= Priya Paul =

Indian businesswoman born 1967

- Born: 30 April 1967 (age 59)
- Occupation: Chairperson of The Park Hotels

Priya Paul (born 1967) is an Indian businesswoman, the chairperson of Apeejay Surrendra Park Hotels, a subsidiary of the Apeejay Surrendra Group, which operates The Park Hotels chain of hotels.

== Career ==
She joined the company after finishing her studies at the Wellesley College working under her father, as a marketing manager at The Park New Delhi, at the age of 21. After the death of Surrendra Paul she succeeded him in 1990 as the chairperson of the hospitality division of the Apeejay Surrendra Group.

== Family business ==
Priya Paul belonged to a family of business which was involved in steel trading, manufacturing and production, which was later moved in to the shipping business. Her father Surrendra Paul had later expanded its portfolio into businesses in hospitality, tea, real estate, finance, logistics etc. Currently, the business is run by her brother, sister and herself.

== Awards ==
- The Federation of Hotels and Restaurants Association of India conferred on her Young Entrepreneur of the Year award in 2000.
- She was nominated for The Economic Times Awards as the Businessperson of the Year (2002–2003)
- Paul has been conferred with the Padma Shri award by the Government of India on eve of the Republic Day, January 2012.
