= Apeejay Surrendra Group =

Indian conglomerate

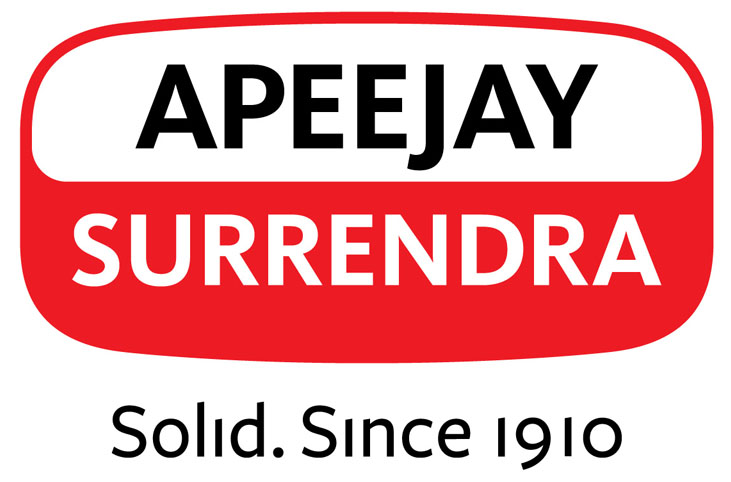
- Type: Private
- Industry: Conglomerate
- Founded: 1910
- Founder: Lala Pyare Lal
- Headquarters: Kolkata, India
- Area served: Worldwide
- Key people: Shirin Paul (Chairperson Emeritus); Karan Paul (Group Chairman); Priya Paul (Director); Priti Paul (Director)
- Subsidiaries: Apeejay Tea; Apeejay Surrendra Park Hotels; Apeejay Shipping; Apeejay Oxford Bookstores; Apeejay Infralogistics; Bengal Shipyard; Apeejay Insurance Broking Services; The Park Hotels
- Website: www.apeejaygroup.com

The Apeejay Surrendra Group is an Indian business conglomerate, established in 1910 in Jalandhar by Lala Pyare Lal. Later, in 1951, the headquarters were relocated to Kolkata. Surrendra Paul was chairman from 1982 until his murder in 1989. Most of the current senior executives are members of his family.

The businesses are tea plantations, fast-moving consumer goods, tea brands, shipping, boutique hotels, commercial real estate, warehousing, business centres, retail brands, bookstores, tea rooms, marine cluster, logistics parks and knowledge parks.

== Apeejay Shipping ==
As of February 2026, Apeejay Shipping, a subsidiary of the Apeejay Surrendra Group, has a fleet of ten ships with a total deadweight tonnage of 669,911 tonnes. This includes a mix of Kamsarmax, Panamax and Supramax classes of bulk carriers with ISO 9001:2015 and ISO 14001:2015 certifications.

New additions to the fleet include APJ Priya 2 and APJ Priti 2, both refurbished Kamsarmax bulk carriers built in Japan and equipped with "state of the art" scrubber technology. The vessels were inducted into the fleet in July and August 2025, respectively. The vessels are named after the sisters of Karan Paul, the chairman of the group. They succeed the former vessels, APJ Priya and APJ Priti, which were inducted in 1967 and 1977, respectively. On 25 February 2026, the company bought another 3,000-tonne multi-purpose, container ship, christened as APJ Karan 2. The maiden voyage from Kolkata to Port Blair is expected in March which will be followed by regular, scheduled services. The acquisitions are part of the group's long-term strategy and sustainable growth according to the chairman.
