= Dramatic Performances Act, 1876 =

Legislation of British India

The Dramatic Performances Act 1876

Imperial Legislative Council
- Citation: Act No.19 of 1876
- Enacted by: Imperial Legislative Council

Repealed by
- Repealed in partial Act 4 of 1914; Repealed in partial Act 10 of 1914; Repealed in(Madras ), Mad. Act 33 of 1954; Repealed as in force in Delhi ( When Mad. Act 33 of 1954 is extended to Delhi); Repealed in Andhra by Andhra Act 8 of 195; Repealed in Madhya Pradesh by MP Act 11 of 1961; Repealed in Andaman and Nicobar Islands by Reg. 10 of; Repealed and deemed obsolete in 2018.
- Status: Amended

The Dramatic Performances Act, 1876 was implemented by the British Government in India in the year 1876 to police seditious Indian theatre. India, being a colony of the British Empire had begun using the theatre as a tool of protest against the oppressive nature of the colonial rule. In order to check these revolutionary impulses, the British Government proceeded to impose the Dramatic Performances Act. Following India's independence in 1947, the Act has not been repealed, and most states have introduced their own modified versions with certain amendments which have in fact, often strengthened the control of the administration over the theatre.

== Provisions of the Act ==
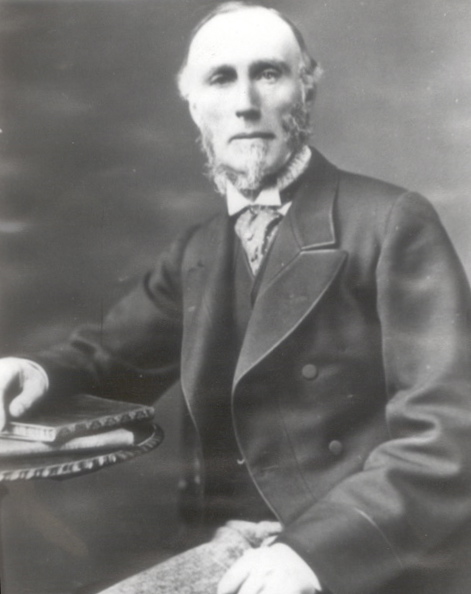
Thomas Baring, 1st Earl of Northbrook, who promulgated the Act in 1876

The Dramatic Performances Act, often shortened to "DPA", was brought into force in the year 1876 under the administration of Viceroy Northbrook. The Act sought to empower the British administration to control better the theatre scene in India.

The Act outlined the restrictions that public performances of a play, pantomime or any other drama would have to adhere to. According to this Act, if the state government judged any play to be of a scandalous nature; disrupting social values; or felt that it might excite feelings of disaffection against the government established by law; or that it would corrupt persons, then the said performance would stand prohibited.

The Act further stated that if any person or groups on whom an order of prohibition had been served refused to comply with the same, such persons or groups would be liable to be punished. The penalty for disobedience of the terms of the Act was either imprisonment for a term extending to about three months, or a fine, or in some cases, both. The Act conferred upon the government the right to information, by which right the persons as empowered by the Act could demand the procurement of all such plays for verification whose content might violate one or many terms of the Act.

The police was granted the license to enter, arrest and seize any persons, scenery, costumes, and or articles whose use or intended use in the performance as prohibited under the terms of the Dramatic Performances Act, had been reasonably established. By this Act, no public performance was to take place in any local area without the sanction of a license.

== Background to the Act ==
=== Creation of the National Theatre ===
In Calcutta, by the early 1860s the need for public theatres was strongly felt. Dramatic performances so far were private and irregular, open to a handful of spectators. Contemporary newspapers advocated the need for theatres to act as vehicles of social reform and instruction in a variety of subjects, as also, a focus of amusement and entertainment. It was to be a democratic space where, by the purchase of a ticket of minimal charge, anyone could be a spectator.

As early as 12 May 1862, the Som Prakas emphasized the need for a public theatre. The Naba Prabandha issue of August 1868 discussed the need for a healthy space which would counter the harmful effects of the vulgar pleasures provided by contemporary panchalis, tarjas and halfakdais. It further suggested the establishment of a public theatre on strict business principles where acting would become a professional domain.

Bhuban Mohan Neogi offered the Baghbazar Amateur Theatre a room in his house on the river Ganges for their practice sessions. The play chosen was Dinabandhu Mitra’s Nil Darpan. The endeavour won the enthusiastic support of such eminent persons as Sisir Kumar Ghose (1840–1911, editor of Amrita Bazar Patrika), Nabagopal Mitra (1840–1894, editor of the National Paper), Mon Mohan Basu (1831–1912), editor of the Madhyastha, among others.

A short-lived controversy arose regarding the theatre's nomenclature. Nabagopal Mitra, nicknamed "National Nabagopal" for his fervent nationalism expressed in his desire to attach the word "National" to every Bengali enterprise, suggested the name "The Calcutta National Theatrical Society", which was finally shortened to "National Theatre". Girish Chandra Ghosh, who was the unofficial leader of the Baghbazar group was not ready to adopt this title and later, he parted company with his friends on account of this broil.

=== Staging of Nil Darpan ===
The first public theatre was, ironically enough, housed in a private residence. The courtyard of Madhusudan Sanyal's house at 33 Upper Chitpore Road was taken for a rent. On 19 November 1872 an advertisement appeared in Sulav Samachar which declared that the Calcutta National Theatrical Society would stage Nil Darpan on Saturday, 7 December. The play was a scathing exposure of the oppression of the British indigo planters of the impoverished Bengali ryots. Sulav Samachar in 10 by December issue of 1872 (adil), not only praised the performance but called for the creation of many more such plays which would inspire the people and make them aware of their rights. The National Paper of 11 December 1872 described the play as "an event of national importance." Amrit Bazar Patrika suggested that the play should not be restricted to Calcutta, but should venture beyond Calcutta to such places as Krishnanagore, Berhampore, Jessore and other such areas where the issues addressed in the play would be more relevant.

However, the staging of Nil Darpan with its blatant demonization of the white-skinned indigo planters, earned the displeasure of the Englishman which, in its 20 December 1872 issue condemned the play for having had damaging effects on the dignity and prestige of the British government and ordered that the performance of the play be immediately stopped. It wrote:

Considering that the Rev.Mr.Long was sentenced to one month’s imprisonment for translating the play, which was pronounced by the High Court as a libel on the Europeans, it seems strange that the Government should allow its representation in Calcutta, unless it has gone through the hands of some competent censor, and the libelous parts excised.

On the other hand, the new public theatre in Calcutta prepared to deal with its own shortcomings. The press did not spare the imperfections of the National Theatre. A letter published in the Education Gazette (13 December) commended the National Theatre for its height and width, but complained of the lack of sufficient light on the stage, absence of wings affecting the aesthetics of the play, and inadequate accommodation. At around this time, two letters appeared in the Indian Mirror (19 and 27 December) in which the so-called National Theatre was heavily criticized on account of its poor equipment and sub-standard acting. It was assumed that the writer of these two letters was none other than Girish Chandra Ghose himself. Faced with such pointed criticism, an appeal was made to the sponsors to uphold the dignity of the National Theatre and to replace the western concerts that were fashionable in Calcutta at this time with more indigenous theatre. The second performance of Nil Darpan was held on 21 December. Many other plays were also staged at around this time by the National Theatre.

=== Creation of the Dramatic Performances Act ===
Stuart Hogg was satirized as a "pig" in the polemical play The Police of Pig and Sheep

Towards the end of March 1875, some members of the National Theatre (that had now become the "Great National Theatre") went on tour. In Lucknow, during a scene of Nil Darpan—the scene where Torap, an Indian ryot, holds down the European Mr. Rouge who assaults the helpless woman Kshetramoni—British soldiers among the audience, enraged, rushed onto the stage and began behaving violently, which led to the breaking up of the play.

The following year, Edward, Prince of Wales visited Calcutta. Soon after his visit, the Great National Theatre presented the play Gajadananda o Jubaraj (or Gajadananda and the Crown Prince), which sought to target Jagadananda Mukherjee, a well-known citizen of Calcutta, Junior Government pleader and member of the Bengal Legislative Council. This man had invited the Prince to his Bhowanipur residence on 3 January 1876 and had taken him on a tour of the ladies’ apartment of the house where he was given a traditional Bengali welcome by the female members of the family. This incident enraged the orthodox Bengali society for it appeared to them that Jagadananda had sacrificed his ethics and culture in a bid to placate the British masters and win favours from them. The satirical play Gajadananda o Jubaraj, based on this incident, was stopped by police order, yet it returned the following week on 26 February under a different name, Hanuman Charitra.

On 1 March, Upendranath Das’s play Surendra Binodini was followed by a satire called The Police of Pig and Sheep, burlesquing Sir Stuart Hogg, Commissioner of Police, and Mr. Lamb, Superintendent of Police for their hostile behavior towards the common people. Although this issue was taken to court, the High Court threw out the case.

On 29 February 1876, Lord Northbrook, Governor-General of India, promulgated an ordinance. The Indian Mirror of 1 March 1876 reported as follows:

A Gazette of India Extra-ordinary was issued last evening containing an Ordinance to empower the Government of Bengal to prohibit certain dramatic performances, which are scandalous, defamatory, seditious, obscene, or otherwise prejudicial to the public interest. The Ordinance shall remain in force till May next by which time a law will be passed by the Viceregal Council on the subject.

In March 1876 the Dramatic Performances Control Bill was introduced in the Viceroy's Council. Despite strong public opposition, the Bill was passed into law in December 1876. While the immediate provocation for the promulgation of the ordinance was the play Gajadananda o Jubaraj, the actual motive of the Government was to silence such nationalistic plays as Nil Darpan, Bharat Mata, Puru-Vikram, Bharate Yavan, Banger Sukhabasan, Beer Nari. This Act also served as a weapon to proscribe, at one time or another up to 1911, the following works: Anandamath, Chandrasekhar, Mrinalini, Chhatrapati Shivaji, Karagar among others.

=== After the Bill is passed ===
Following the promulgation of the Dramatic Performances Act, the government felt dissatisfied with its terms and sought to devise some sort of punishment for the sponsors of the prohibited plays. Their aim was to charge the sponsors if not on the ground of a play itself, then at least, on some other point. On 4 March 1876, when the play Sati Ki Kalankini was being performed on the stage of the Great National Theatre, the police stormed the place and arrested the director Upendra Nath Das, the manager Amritlal Basu and eight others on the charge of immorality for an earlier play, Surendra Binodini. On 8 March Upendra Nath and Amritlal were sentenced to one month's simple imprisonment while the rest were released. Later however, the High Court overruled the order of the Police Court and released the duo.

This case reflects the extent to which the rulers of colonial era sought to gag free speech, and noticing within the public theatre the germs of a nationalist movement, came down hard on theatre groups, individual directors of plays and even those who appeared to be the sympathizers of this creative domain.

== Post-Independence scenario ==
Following the independence of India on 15 August 1947, this Act was not entirely abolished. Post-1947, many states have introduced their own amended versions of this Act and some have in fact modified it to such an extent that it has even increased the Government's control over public theatre performance in Independent India. The Bombay DPA, brought into action in 1950, is one such case in point.

Stringent censorship of public theatres has in fact continued in India in the post-independence era. The police have often called upon members of a particular theatre association or individual persons to furnish entire manuscripts of plays for scrutiny by the censorship authorities, which then might or might not be banned or selectively abridged. In 1953, the Indian People's Theatre Association was faced with such a trial when they were called upon to turn in about fifty manuscripts, which included the plays Nil Darpan and Nabanna.

In 1953, Malayalam playwright and film director Thoppil Bhasi’s play Ningalenne Communistakki i.e. You Made Me a Communist was banned by the Thiruvananthapuram District Magistrate according to the provisions of the Dramatic Performances Act.The government alleged that the play contained provocative material which might prove harmful to the integrity of the state and encourage people to rise in revolt against the government. This play charts the life of a middle-aged man as he journeys from the cloisters of a conservative upper-class Hindu family to communism. After being banned, the play, its cast and director invited greater trouble upon themselves by violating the ban and performing the play at Kovalam, near Thiruvananthapuram. This led to the immediate arrest of all the actors of the play. However, an effective opposition from the Communist Party in Kerala compelled the High Court to declare the ban null and void two months later. West Bengal repealed the Act in the year 1962 following persistent agitation from the ranks of the artists’ fraternity.

The India Code Compilation of Unrepealed Central Acts declared in 1993 that the Act is one of the "obsolete laws" that exists in India today. The report of the committee to identify the central acts which are not relevant or no longer needed or require repeal/re-enactment in the present socio-economic context has identified this Act as suitable for repeal.

== References and bibliography ==
- Bhatia, Nandi. Acts of Authority/Acts of Resistance: Theater and Politics in Colonial and Postcolonial India. University of Michigan Press, 2004.
- Mukherjee, Sushil Kumar. The Story of the Calcutta Theatres--1753–1980. Kolkata: K.P.Bagchi and Company, 1982.
