= Indigo revolt =

1859 peasant rebellion in Bengal against European Indigo planters

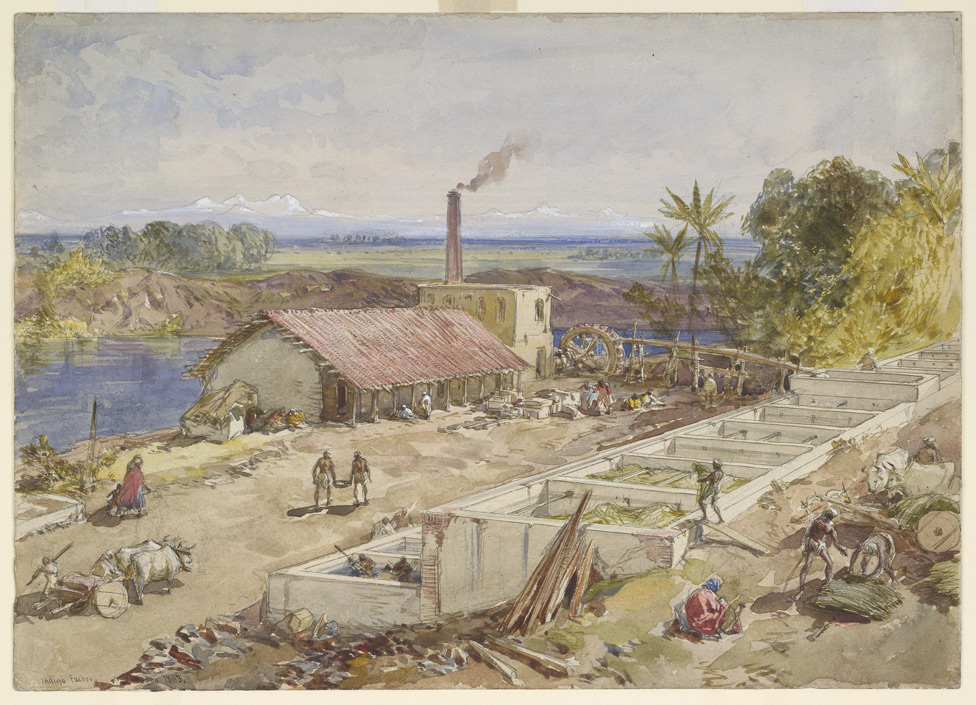
A Bikaner dye factory in Bengal, 1867.

The Indigo revolt (or Nil bidroha; Bengali: নীল বিদ্রোহ) was a peasant movement and subsequent uprising of indigo farmers against the indigo planters, that arose in Bengal in 1859, and continued for over a year. The village headmen (Mandals) and substantial ryots were the most active and numerous groups who led the peasants. Sometimes disgruntled former employees of European planters - 'gomashta' or 'diwan' of the Indigo factories, took the lead to mobilise the peasants against the Indigo planters.

In the summer of 1859 in Bengal when thousands of ryots refused to grow indigo for the European planters with a show of rage and undying resolve, it became one of the most remarkable peasant movements in Indian history. Emerging in the Nadia district, led by two local Zamindars, Digambar Biswas and Bishnu Charan Biswas, the revolt spread to other districts of Bengal in the 1860s and indigo factories and planters faced violent attacks in many places. The revolt ended after the formation of Indigo commission in 1860 which offered reforms of the system, which was inherently exploitative.

== Background ==
Indigo planting in Bengal dates back to 1777, when Louis Bonnaud, a Frenchman, introduced it to the Indian subcontinent. He became the first indigo planter in Bengal, starting to cultivate the crop at Taldanga and Gondolpara near Hooghly. With the Nawabs of Bengal under Company rule, indigo planting became more and more commercially profitable because of the demand for blue dye in Europe. It was introduced in large parts of Burdwan, Bankura, Birbhum, North 24 Parganas, Nadia Jessore and Pabna, and by 1830 there were more than a thousand indigo factories throughout Bengal. The indigo planters forced the peasants to plant indigo instead of food crops on their own lands. They provided loans, called dadon, at a very high interest. Once a farmer took such loans he remained in debt for his whole life before passing it to his successors. The price paid by the planters was meagre, only 2.5% of the market price. The farmers could make no profit growing indigo. The farmers were totally unprotected from the indigo planters, who resorted to mortgages or destruction of their property if they were unwilling to obey them. Government rules favoured the planters. By an act in 1833, the planters were granted a free hand to deal with the peasants. The zamindars, who also stood to benefit from indigo cultivation, sided with the planters. Under these conditions, the farmers resorted to revolt.

The Bengali middle class were unanimous in their support of the peasants. Bengali intellectual Harish Chandra Mukherjee described the plight of the poor farmer in his newspaper The Hindu Patriot. However the articles were overshadowed by Dinabandhu Mitra, who depicted the situation in his play Nil Darpan.His play created a huge controversy which was later banned by the Company authorities to control the agitation among the Indians.

== Revolt ==
The revolt started in Chougacha village near Krishnanagar, Nadia district, where two peasant leaders, Bishnucharan Biswas and Digambar Biswas first led the rebellion against the planters in Bengal at March, 1859. It spread rapidly in Murshidabad, Birbhum, Burdwan, Pabna, Khulna and Jessore. In Kalna, Burdwan Shyamal Mondal led the revolt. Mondal published a magazine named "Mrittika" and wrote about oppressions of the Indigo planters and plights of the peasants. Gopal Mandal, a peasant leader, with his resolute band of a hundred and fifty peasants attacked and beat back the lathials whom the planter Larmour had sent down to intimidate peasants into accepting advances for cultivating indigo. Some indigo planters were given a public trial and executed. The indigo depots were burned down. Many planters fled to avoid being caught. The Zamindars were also targets of the rebellious peasants.

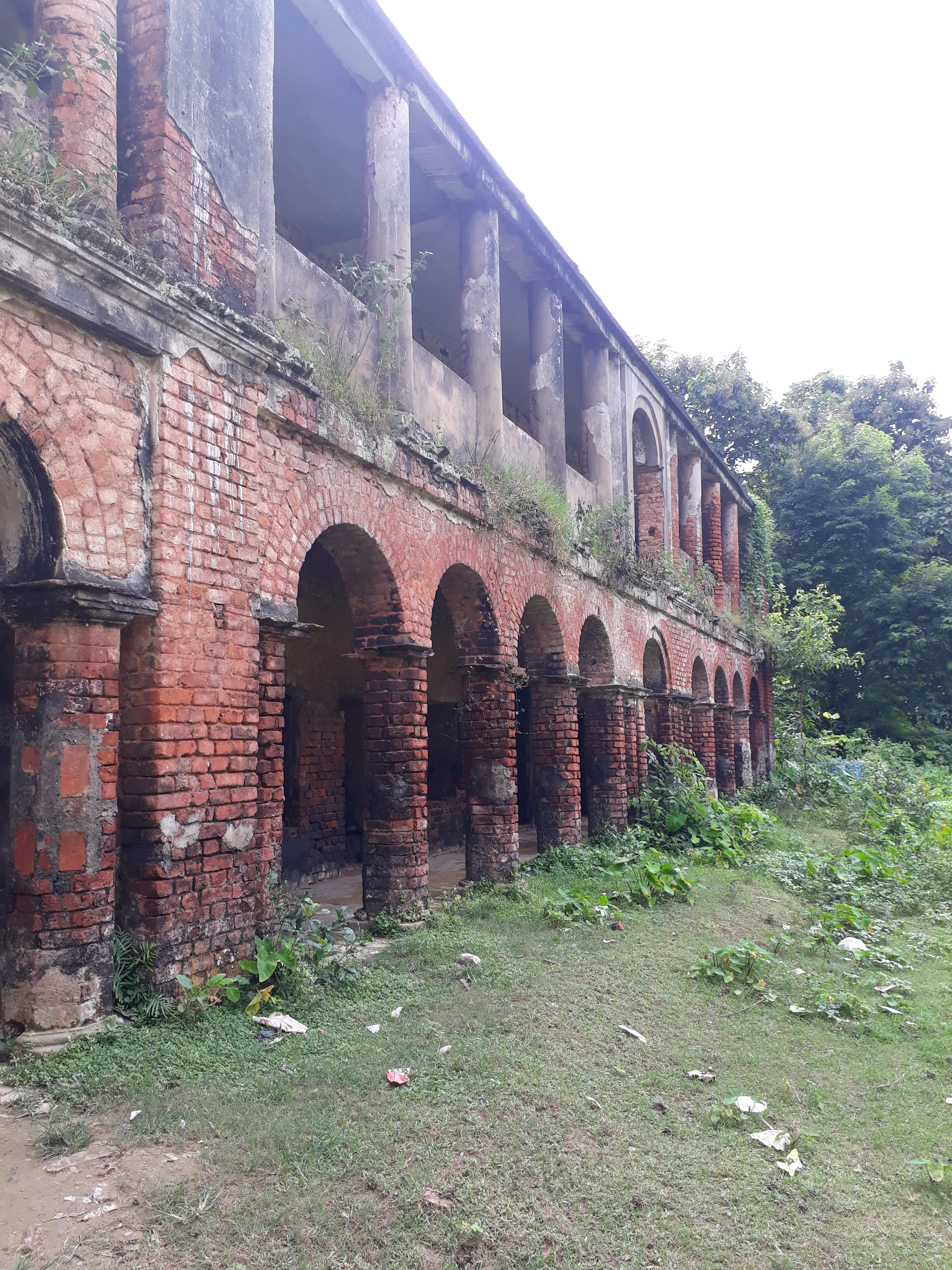
Mongolganj Indigo Kuthi in North 24 Parganas

In response, the planters employed groups of mercenaries and engaged in continual clashes with the rebelling peasants. Historians have noted that unlike the Indian Rebellion of 1857, members of the revolt did not direct their hostility towards the British colonial authorities but instead focused their attention towards European planters and merchants; historian Subhas Bhattacharya noted in The Indigo Revolt of Bengal (1977) that the "movement began and ended as a struggle against the planters." The revolt was eventually suppressed by the mercenary forces of the indigo planters, though not before it put a temporarily halt to large areas of indigo production along the Bengal and Kathgara regions. The planters sued hundreds of peasants for breaking their indigo contracts, with over seventeen thousand rupees being spent defending these lawsuits.

== Aftermath ==
The peasants' techniques of resistance were not the same everywhere. The revolt that started in Chaugacha and Gobindapur by Bishnucharan and Digamber was armed conflict against the planters, but it varied with time and place and was mostly passive and non-violent. The historian Jogesh Chandra Bagal describes the revolt as a non-violent revolution and gives this as a reason why the indigo revolt was a success compared to the Sepoy Revolt. R.C. Majumdar in "History of Bengal" goes so far as to call it a forerunner of the non-violent passive resistance later successfully adopted by Gandhi. The revolt had a strong effect on the government, which immediately appointed the "Indigo Commission" in 1860. In the commission report, magistrate of Faridpur E. W. L. Tower testified that "not a chest of Indigo reached England without being stained with human blood".

In 1860, the British colonial authorities formed the Indigo Commission in response to pressure from Nawab Abdul Latif, who aimed to put an end to the repressions of indigo planters; the Indigo Commission's activities led to the passage of the 1862 Indigo Act.

== In popular culture ==
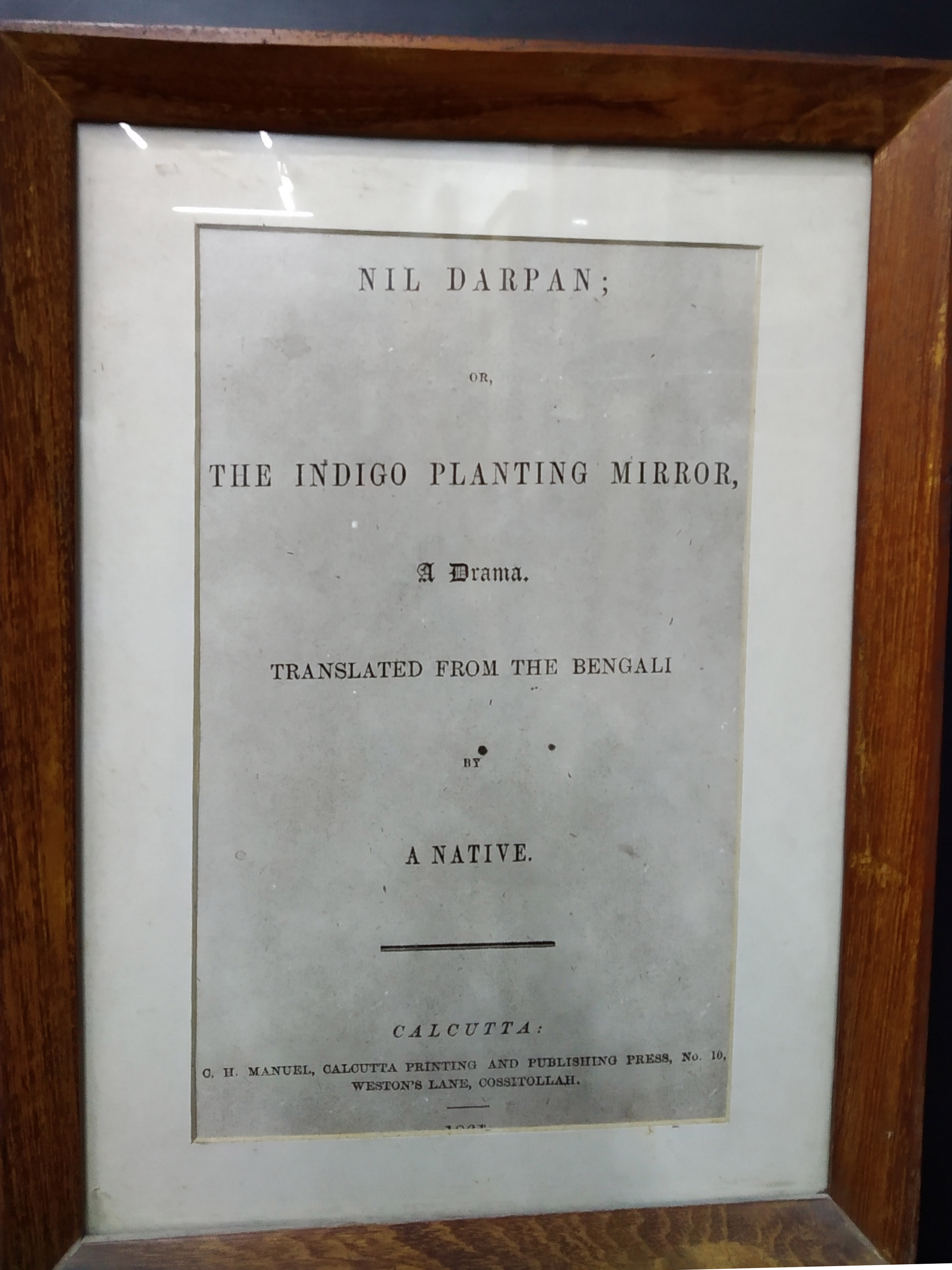
Nil Darpan

Dinabandhu Mitra's 1860 play Nil Darpan was published in Dhaka and was based on the revolt. It was translated into English by poet Michael Madhusudan Dutta and published by Anglican priest James Long. For publishing the play, Long was put on trial by the colonial authorities and sentenced to a period of imprisonment and fine of 1,000 rupees. Kaliprasanna Singha, a friend of Long, paid the fine for him. The play proved to be essential to the development of theatre in Bengal and influenced Girish Chandra Ghosh, who in 1872 would go on to establish the National Theatre in Kolkata, where the first play ever commercially staged there was Nil Darpan. Ben Musgrave's play Indigo Giant, inspired by Dinabandhu Mitra's trail-blazing Indigo Mirror, was staged in Bangladesh in 2022 and the UK in 2024.

== See also ==
- Champaran Satyagraha
- Indian Rebellion of 1857
- History of Bengal
- Indigofera
- Mahishya
- Zamindar
- Colonialism
