= Ogrohayon =

8th month of the Bengali calendar

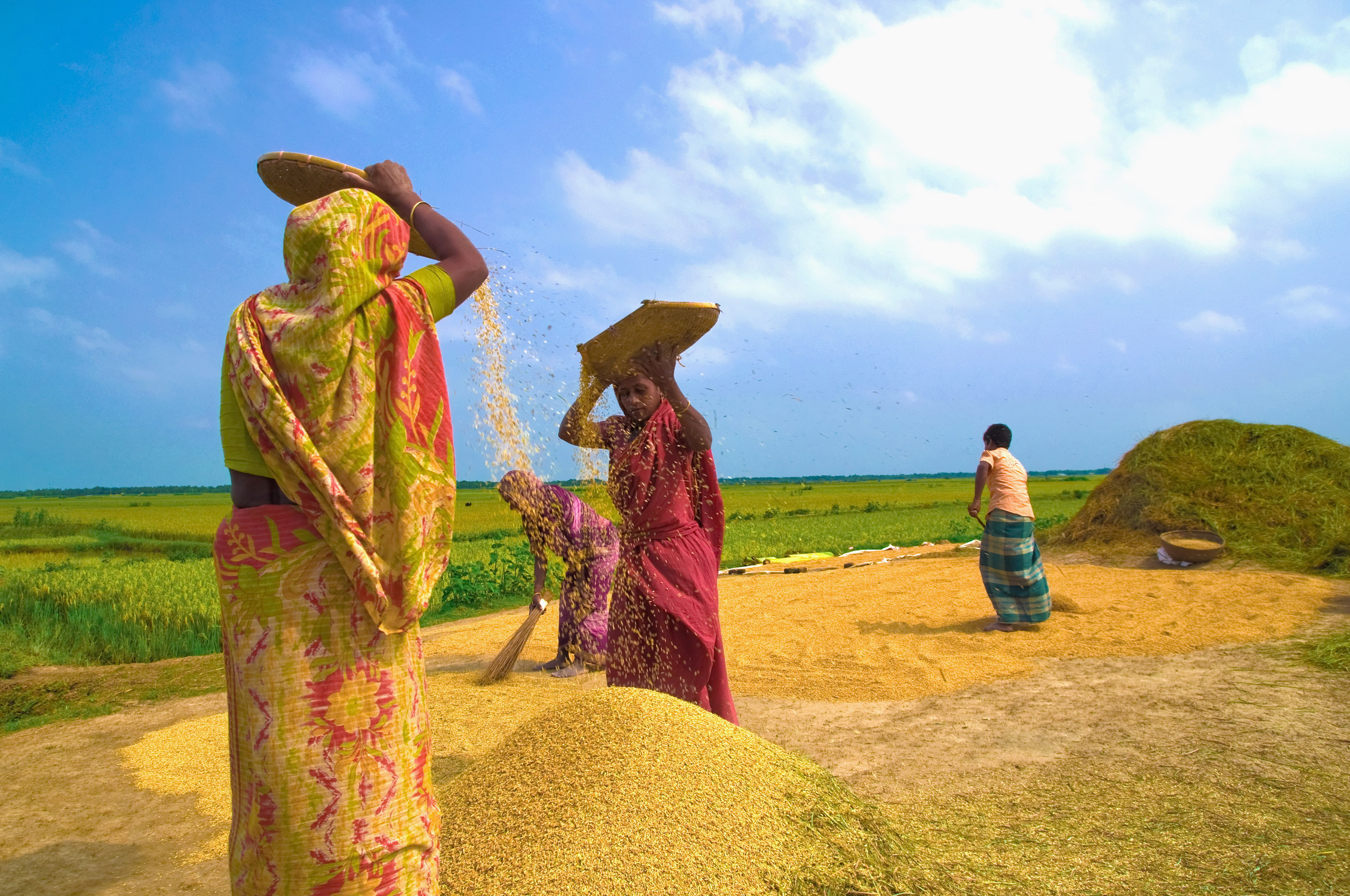
- In Bangladesh Ogrohayon is celebrated as the month of the main rice harvest of the year
- Native name: অগ্রহায়ণ (Bengali)
- Calendar: Bengali calendar
- Month number: 8
- Number of days: 30 (Bangladesh); 29/30 (India)
- Season: Hemanta (Dry Season)
- Gregorian equivalent: Mid November to Mid December
- Significant days: Nabanna

Ogrohayon (Bengali: অগ্রহায়ণ, Ôgrôhayôn), also spelled Agrahayan or Aghran, is the eighth month of the Bengali calendar. It is the second of the two months that make up the dry season, locally called "Hemanta" (Bengali: হেমন্ত, Hemôntô). It is commonly believed that this month is very auspicious for marriage.

== Festivals ==
Nabanna (Bengali: নবান্ন, romanized: Nobānno, lit. 'New Feast') is a harvest celebration usually celebrated with feasts, dancing, and music. As Nabanna is a festival of food, on this day locals usually prepare meals like pitha. It is celebrated on the first day of Ogrohayon.

== Events ==
- Nurul Momen was born on 10 Ogrohayon 1313 Bangabda (25 November 1906).
- Mahesh Chandra Bhattacharyya was born on 17 Ogrohayon 1265 Bangabda (1 December 1858).
- Bangladeshi president Hussain Muhammad Ershad resigned after months of mass protests on 21 Ogrohayon 1397 Bangabda (6 December 1990).
