= Sambhunath Pandit =

Indian judge, social reformer (1820–1867)

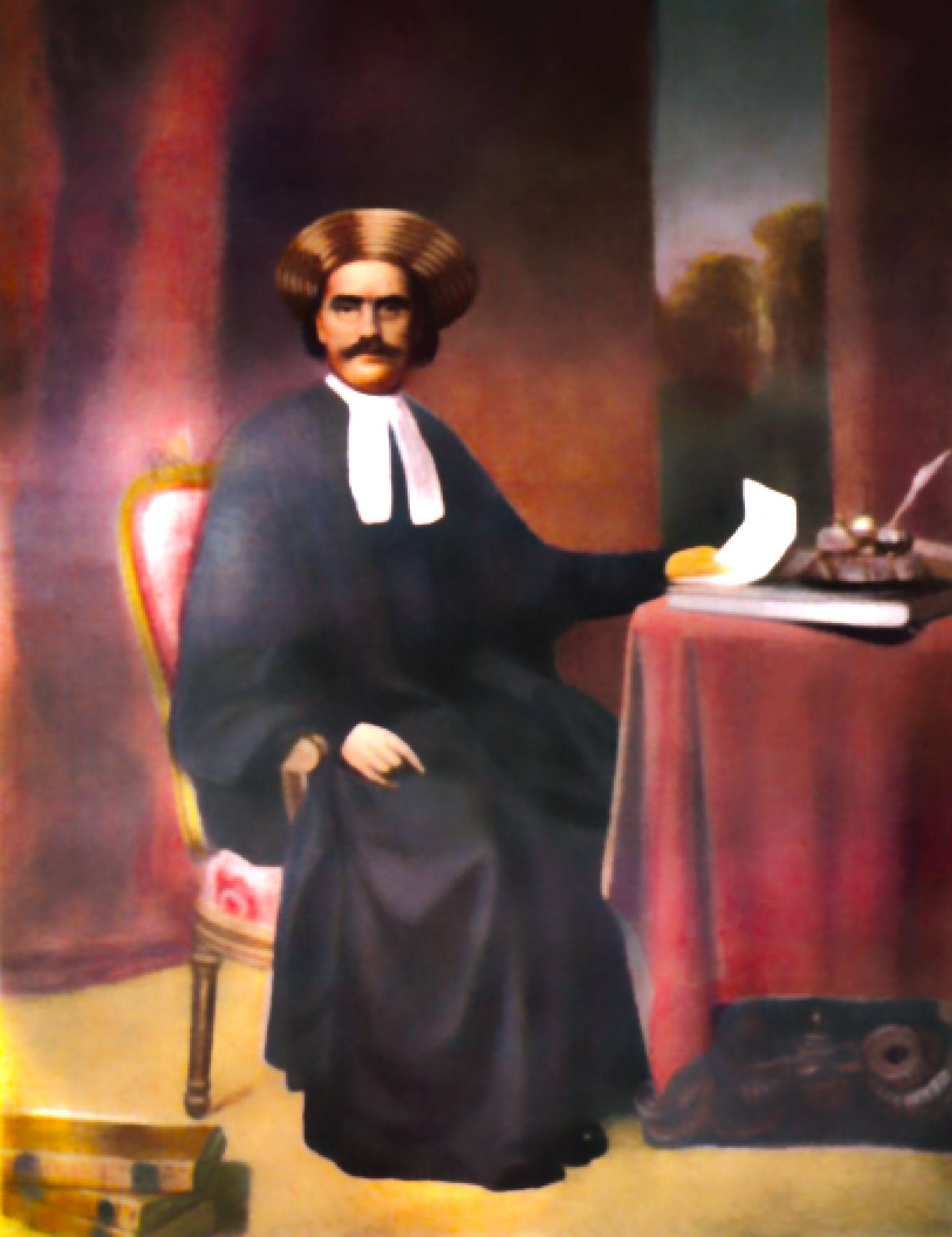
- Born: 1820; Calcutta, Bengal Presidency, Company Raj
- Died: 6 June 1867 (aged 46–47); Calcutta, Bengal Presidency, British India
- Occupations: Judge; social reformer

Sambhunath Pandit (1820–1867) was the first Indian to become a sitting judge of a court of law in British India.

== Early life ==
Sambhunath Pandit was born to a Kashmiri Pandit family in Kolkata. His grandfather Manasaram Pandit had fled from their ancestral lands in the Kashmir valley to avoid persecution of Hindus conducted by the Durrani Empire & resettled in Varanasi. Manasaram's eldest son & Shambhunath's father Shivaprasada had migrated to Lucknow in order to secure a job in the darbar of the Nawab of Oudh, for which he had learned Persian (the court language) & Urdu. However, on the invitation of his younger brother Sadashiva, he migrated to Calcutta, the seat of power of the Company rule, where he worked as a clerk in a civil court after learning English. Shambhunath, due to his ill-health, was sent to live his childhood in the house of his maternal uncle at Lucknow, where he learned Persian & Urdu. On returning to Calcutta, he joined the Oriental Seminary. However, he had to drop out of school in order to get married at a young age (according to the prevalent traditions). In order to support his family, he started working as an assistant record-keeper in the Sadar Dewani Adalat, utilising his knowledge in English, Urdu & Persian. Shambhunath earned the goodwill of his British superiors by exhibiting his skill in English by translating court documents written in Bengali & Persian into English, which led to him being promoted to the position of clerk responsible for issuing court decrees. He also earned further fame by translating the Opus Majus into English.

== Law career ==
Having earned the goodwill of his British employers, Pandit began practicing law at the Sadar Dewani Adalat from 16 November 1848. Soon he moved to the Sadar Faujdari Adalat as a criminal lawyer. On 28 March 1853, he was appointed as a government pleader. Apart from his work as a lawyer, he also worked as the inaugural Professor of Law at the law department of the Hindu College from 1855 to 1857. In 1861, Pandit was promoted to the position of senior government pleader by the new administration. Within a year, on 18 November 1862, on the recommendation of the Chief Justice Sir Barnes Peacock, Shambhunath Pandit was promoted to the position of a sitting judge at the newly founded Calcutta High Court.

== Public life ==
Sambhunath Pandit was a close friend of Iswarchandra Vidyasagar & John Elliot Drinkwater Bethune & was an ardent supporter of female education. He also supported Vidyasagar's attempts to conduct the first widow remarriage on 5 December 1855. In 1851, he became a founder member of British Indian Association. Pandit was also noted for his charitable activities among the poor of the city.

== Personal life ==
After the death of first wife Malorani early into their marriage, Pandit married a non-Brahmin Bengali Hindu girl called Haridasi. Due to this intercaste marriage, he was disowned by his family. So Pandit converted to Brahmoism.

In the History of the Brahmo Samaj, Sivanath Sastri writes, "In the month of June 1852, a number of influential men of that suburban town (meaning Bhowanipur) assembled at the house of the late Sambhunath Pandit, latterly a Judge of Calcutta High Court, and established an Association under the name of Jnan Prakasika Sabha, or "Truth Revealing Society", whose object it was to promote the spiritual enlightenment of its members. It was virtually a Brahmo Samaj, though the name was different. Sambhunath Pandit became its president, Babu Annadaprasad Banerjee, a pleader of the High Court, vice-president, and Baboo Harishchandra Mukherji of the Hindu Patriot fame its secretary... From the first anniversary of the Society held in 1853, it was duly and formally installed as Bhowanipur Brahmo Samaj." It followed the Adi Samaj form of divine service. While serving as a record-keeper, he had published a book entitled On the Being of God championing monotheism & aniconism.

With Haridasi, Shambhunath Pandit had one son - Prananath, who also became a lawyer at the Calcutta High Court & a daughter Malati, who he had enrolled in Bethune School as one of its first batch of students. After the death of Haridasi, Shambhunath married another Bengali Hindu woman called Swaruparani. Together, they had 2 sons - Radhagobinda & Shankaranath.

Shambhunath Pandit died of an infectious carbuncle at his Bhowanipore residence (situated near Bangur Institute of Neurology) on 6th June 1867, at the age of 47.

== Legacy ==
A government hospital and an important road in Bhowanipur are named after him.
