= Ardhendu Sekhar Mustafi =

Bengali theatre actor

Ardhendu Shekar Mustafi
- অর্ধেন্দু শেখর মুস্তাফি
- Born: 25 January 1850; Bagbazar, Calcutta, Bengal Presidency
- Died: 5 September 1908 (aged 58); Calcutta, Bengal Presidency
- Education: Hare school
- Occupations: Theater Actor, director, and writer

Ardhendu Sekhar Mustafi (25 January 1850 — 5 September 1908) was a Bengali actor, playwright and theater personality.

== Career ==
Mustafi was born at Bagbazar, Kolkata, British India in 1850. He studied in the Hare School. Mustafi first performed in 1867 in a satire drama Kichhu Kichhu Bujhi at Pathuriaghata Royal palace. He joined Bagbazar Amateur Theater group and performed in Sadhabar Ekadashi, written by novelist Dinabandhu Mitra. He was known as a rival and associates actor of Girish Chandra Ghosh. Mustafi helped Ghosh to establish the National Theater in 1872. Amrita Lal Basu described Mustafi as 'An actor made by God' because he could perform different type of characters in a play. In Nildarpan, Mustafi played both male and female roles including the characters of antagonist Englishman, Wood Sahib. He was also a successful drama teacher of Kolkata. Mustafi acted in various stages including Indian National Theater, Great National Theater, Emerald Theater, Arya Natya Samaj, Minerva, Aurora and Star Theater since 1872 to 1904. He also wrote a book named Binar Jhankar.

== Plays ==
- Nabin Tapaswini
- Durgeshnandini
- Sirajddaula
- Mir Kashim
- Prafulla
- Rizia
- Pratapaditya
- Buro Shaliker Ghare Ro
- Meghnadbadh
- Balidan
- Hirakchurna
