= Bhadralok =

Social class in colonial Bengal

Bhadralok (bhôdrôlok, transl. gentleman) is Bengali for the new class of 'gentlefolk' who arose during British rule in India in the Bengal region in the eastern part of the Indian subcontinent.

== Caste and class makeup ==
According to Sekhar Bandyopadhyay, the Bhadralok primarily, though not exclusively, belonged to "the three traditional upper castes of Bengal", the Brahmin, Baidya and Kayastha. Wealth, English education, and high status in terms of administrative service were the factors which led to the rise of this 'new aristocracy' and since a large number of the three upper castes had administrative skills and economic advantages, they formed the majority of Bhadralok in 19th century Bengal. The Bhadralok "was never a closed status group", in practice it was an open social group. A majority of the Brahmins and Kayasthas, being poor and illiterate, were not regarded as Bhadralok. By the late 19th century many of the middle-ranking peasant and trading castes, who had gained affluency, had entered the ranks of Bhadralok .

== Politics ==
The polity and politics of West Bengal have been dominated by the bhadralok despite their lesser numerical presence in the state. Most Chief Ministers of West Bengal since 1947 have been from Bhadralok social groups.

== Economy ==
Among others, Joya Chatterji, Lecturer in History of Modern South Asia at Cambridge and Fellow of Trinity College, blames the Bhadralok class for the economic decline of the state of West Bengal after India's independence in 1947. She writes in her book, titled The Spoils of Partition:

Bengal's partition frustrated the plans and purposes of the very groups who had demanded it. Why their strategy failed so disastrously is a question which will no doubt be debated by bhadralok Bengal long after the last vestiges of its influence have been swept away... But perhaps part of the explanation is this: for all their self-belief in their cultural superiority and their supposed talent for politics, the leaders of bhadralok Bengal misjudged matters so profoundly because, in point of fact, they were deeply inexperienced as a political class. Admittedly, they were highly educated and in some ways sophisticated, but they had never captured the commanding heights of Bengal's polity or its economy. They had been called upon to execute policy but not to make it. They had lived off the proceeds of the land, but had never organised the business of agriculture. Whether as theorists or practitioners, they understood little of the mechanics of production and exchange, whether on the shop-floor or in the fields. Above all, they had little or no experience in the delicate arts of ruling and taxing people. Far from being in the vanguard as they liked to believe, by 1947 Bengal's bhadralok had become a backward-looking group, living in the past, trapped in the aspic of outdated assumptions, and so single-mindedly focused upon their own narrow purposes that they were blind to the larger picture and the big changes that were taking place around them.

== Popular culture ==
The Bhadralok class appears frequently in popular Bengali literature, including in the novel and stories of Saratchandra Chattopadhyay and Rabindranath Tagore. Kaliprasanna Singha in his famous book Hootum Pyanchar Naksha sarcastically criticized the class's social attitude and hypocrisy during its ascension to prominence in the nineteenth century.

In the 1990s and 2000s, the band Chandrabindoo highlighted the class' hypocritical attitude and paradoxical social role in their lyrics to the songs "Sokale Uthiya Ami Mone Mone Boli", "Amar Modhyobitto Bheeru Prem", "Amra Bangali Jaati" and many more.

== See also ==
- Christianity in West Bengal
- Bengal Renaissance
- Nastanirh
- Gentleman
