= Kaliprasanna Singha =

Bengali writer (1841–1870)

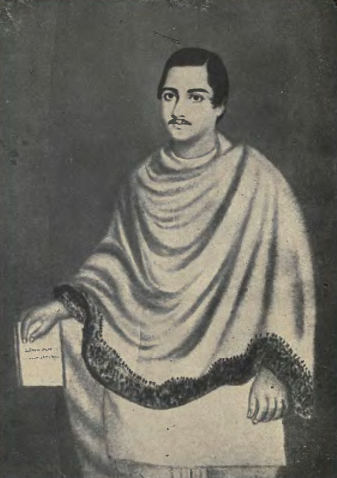
- Portrait from Memoirs of Kali Prossunno Singh
- Born: 23 February 1841; Calcutta (now Kolkata), Bengal Presidency, Company Raj
- Died: 24 July 1870 (aged 29); Calcutta, Bengal Presidency, British India
- Other name: Hootum Pyancha
- Occupation: Litterateur
- Spouse: Sharatkumari Devi
- Parent(s): Nandalal Singha, Trailokyamohini Devi

Kaliprasanna Singha (23 February 1840 – 24 July 1870), well known by his pen name Hootum Pyancha, was a Bengali author, playwright, and philanthropist. His most famous work was the translation of the ancient Hindu epic Mahabharata into Bengali. Singha's book Hootum Pyanchar Naksha (lit. 'Sketches by a Watching Owl'), a compilation of satirical social sketches, is another work that is noted for reflecting Bengali urban society of the time. He is also remembered as a philanthropist who helped several people and movements in distress.

== Early life ==
Though the exact date of Kaliprasanna Sinha's birth is debatable, on 24 February 1840, the Calcutta Courier published the news that celebrations were held on 23 February 1840 on the occasion of the birth of the son of Nandalal Singha of Jorasanko. The confusion about his year of birth is because researchers initially found his death announcement where it was stated that he died at the age of 29 in 1870. However, if the news published in Calcutta Courier, found at a later date, is taken into account, his date of birth would be somewhere near 23 February 1840.

Kaliprasanna was born into the renowned Bengali Kayastha Zamindar family of Jorasanko in North Kolkata. His father, Nandalal Sinha, was the son of Jayo Krishno Sinha (or Jay Krishna Sinha), who was one of the directors of Hindu College, Kolkata. His great-grandfather Shantiram Sinha (1722 – 1778) established the Jorasanko Sinha Family. He left immense wealth for his sons – Pran Krishna (1764 – 1812) and Joy Krishna (1770 – 1820). Joy Krishna was childless for very long, but finally his youngest wife Shibsundari Devi gave birth to their son Nandalal in 1819.

In 1846, Nandalal died of cholera when Kaliprasanna was only six years old. A judge of the lower court, Babu Hara Chandra Ghosh, the Singha family's neighbour and a son of Babu Pran Krishna Singha's friend Abhay Charan Ghosh, was appointed as his legal guardian. As tensions arose among his relatives for the family inheritance, Kaliprasanna's mother Trailokyamohini Devi had to fight legal battle against their relatives – for which Kaliprasanna had expressed sadness in Hootum Pyanchar Naksha.

In his short span of life (1841–1870), Kaliprasanna was a man of unbelievable versatile qualities. It is said that he had a power to recollect anything that he would see or hear even once, and that too from a very early age. The foundation of the Vidyotsahini Sabha by him at age 14 bears testimony to the abilities of this child prodigy. Ishwarchandra Vidyasagar was astonished to see how this young boy could mingle with so many elderly associates and lead them towards recreational pursuits such as organisation of the theatres. Hootum Pyanchar Naksha is his immortal creation in which he portrayed the picture of the 19th-century babudom in Kolkata. Sunil Gangopadhyay, in his epoch making novel Sei Somoy (Those Days), recreated the same period with Kaliprasanna as the symbolic character, his name in this historical fiction being Nabinkumar.

== Marriage ==
Kaliprasanna married Bhubanmohini, a daughter of Loknath Basu of Bagbazar in 1854, but she died within a few days. Sometime later, Kaliprasanna married Sharatkumari, daughter of Chandranath Basu of Hatibagan, and sister of Prabhas Chandra Basu. Chandranath Basu's wife (presumably Sharatkumari's mother) was a granddaughter of Raja Prasanna Narayan Deb.

== Education ==
Kaliprasanna was admitted to Hindu College, currently known as Presidency University. In 1857 he left college. He continued his education in English, Bengali and Sanskrit at home. He enhanced his English knowledge under the guidance of a European teacher Mr. Kirkpatrick. He had contribution in different fields as an author, editor, a publisher, a philanthropist, a social worker, and a great patron of art, literature and culture.

== Contributions ==
=== Vidyotsahini Sabha and contribution to Bengali Theatre ===
Other than his contribution to literature, Kaliprasanna had immense contribution to Bengali theatre too. He established the Vidyotsahini Sabha (a platform for those interested in education) at the age of 15. It was established most probably in 1855. Eminent gentlemen like Kristo Das Pal, Acharya Krishna Kamal Bhattacharya, Peary Chand Mitra, and Radhanath Sikdar were associated with it. Vidyotsahini Sabha was mainly responsible for promoting Hindu theatre, and Vidyotsahini Mancha was set up in 1857 at Kaliprasanna's home. The members of this group performed Shakuntala in 1857. According to a witness, "The performance of 'Sakuntala' at Simla was, however a failure, This is not to be wondered at; for Sakuntala being a masterpiece of dramatic genius, requires versatile and consummate talent for its representation, rarely to be met with in this country."

Later on Kaliprasanna enacted the play Benisanhar, which received a warm response and the performance was praised in Samvad Prabhakar. Young Kaliprasanna played the role of Bhanumati, a female character. Later in 1857 itself, Kaliprasanna himself wrote the play Vikramorvashi based on the Sanskrit composition of Kalidas. Kaliprasanna played the role of Pururava. The drama was highly eulogised including the performance of Kaliprasanna as actor.

Through Vidyotsahini Sabha he felicitated Michael Madhusudan Dutt for introducing blank verse in Bengali poetry. Kaliprasanna awarded Michael Madhusudan with a certificate and a silver peg.

Kaliprasanna also wrote several other plays, such as Babu (1854), Sabitri Satyaban (1858) and Malati Madhab (1856).

=== Publications ===
He also edited/published several magazines like Vidyotsahini Patrika, Paridarshak, Sarvatattwa Prakashika, Bibidhartha Samgraha etc. Paridarshak was a Bengali daily newspaper started by Jaganmohan Tarkalankar and Madangopal Goswami. For improvement of the newspaper, Kaliprasanna took over editorship of the newspaper. The quality of the newspaper was ahead of its times and Kristo Das Pal wrote, "He also started a first class vernacular daily newspaper, the like of which we have not yet seen." Bibidhartho Samgraha was first edited by Babu Rajendralal Mitra, the well known native gentleman. After him that magazine had been revived under the auspices of Kaliprasanna Singha.

In 1862 the most acclaimed Hootum Pyanchar Naksha had been published. In this book he criticised the activities of the then middle class societies in a humorous manner under the pseudonym Hootum Pyancha.

He provided financial assistance to magazines like Tattwabodhini Patrika, Somprakash, Mookerjee's Magazine, Bengalee, Doorbin and Hindoo Patriot.

=== Translation of Mahabharata ===
Under his editorship, the Mahabharata was translated to Bengali in prose form, which is still read and published widely. The whole project was supervised by Ishwarchandra Vidyasagar. The translation was completed in a house named "Sarswatashram" at Baranagar in North Kolkata. Kaliprasanna distributed Mahabharata without charging a price. Kaliprasanna compromised his several mahals(owned lands)to bear the expenses.

He also translated "Bhagavad Gita" the Hindu sacred scripture, which was published posthumously.

=== Social contributions ===
After the death of Harish Chandra Mukherjee in 1861, the magazine dedicated to welfare of native Indians, was facing extinction due to want of money. Kaliprasanna, who revered Harish Chandra immensely, bought the ownership at a cost of fifty thousand rupees, and appointed Shambhu Chandra Mookerjee for management of the magazine. Kaliprasanna also contributed five thousand rupees for preserving the memorial of Harish Chandra, and also wished to dedicate a land for development of a memorial building, which however did not materialise due to lack of interest among others. He also donated to the fund for saving the editor of "Hindu Patriot" Harish Chandra Mukherjee's house from auction after Harish's death.

He also advocated widow remarriage, and after the enactment of Act, to popularise the concept, he declared a reward of Rs 1000 to every man who married a widow.

When Rev. James Long, an Anglican priest of the Church Missionary Society was accused of sedition for translating the controversial Nil Darpan, a Bengali-language play written by Dinabandhu Mitra criticising the treatment of Indian ryots by European indigo merchants Kaliprasanna paid the entire amount of a Rs 1000 fine which was imposed on Rev. Long.

Kaliprasanna was also appointed as an honorary magistrate and Justice of Peace in 1863. He also served as the Chief Presidency Magistrate of Calcutta for sometime. He was also elected as a Municipal Commissioner for Calcutta. Kaliprasanna however incurred huge financial crisis during the last few days of his life as he had no control on expenditure and there was no end to his donations.

== Death ==
Kaliprasanna had started drinking heavily which caused health issues. He died on 24 July 1870 due to liver ailment, at the age of 29, leaving behind his huge contributions.

Kaliprasanna's extravagant ways most of which was dedicated to the welfare of the society however took a toll on him in his last days. It was said that the distribution of several copies of Mahabharata alone cost him a huge sum of two and a half lakhs of rupees in those days. It has been also learnt, that though a major income of the zamindari family came from the revenue paid by peasants, Kaliprasanna though being a zamindar, fought for the cause of the peasants and freed several peasants from the revenue burden. In his last days, he was learnt to run into huge debts, and the large estates in Orissa and Bengal Club in Kolkata were sold. He was also deceived by friends and relatives.

Kaliprasanna died before having any issue. After his death, his wife adopted Bijay Chandra Singha, who was the son of Balaichand Singha, the great-grandson of Babu Pran Krishna Singha. Bijoy Chandra took over the Hindu Patriot.

After his death Kristo Das Pal wrote "But beneath the troubled waters of youth there was a silvery current of geniality, generosity, good-fellowship and high mindedness, which few could behold without admiring. With all his faults Kaliprasunno was a brilliant character and we cannot adequately express our regret that a career begun under such glowing promises should have come to such an abrupt and unfortunate close."

== In popular culture ==
He was a Major inspiration for the lead character in Sunil Gangopadhyay's famous Novel Shei Somoy. His name in the novel being Nabinkumar.
