= Oriental Seminary =

First Privately Owned and run School in Kolkata

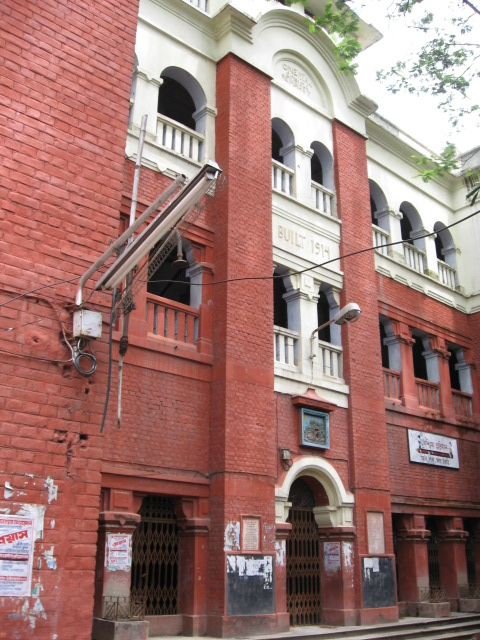

Information
- Established: 1829; 197 years ago
- Founder: Gour Mohan Addy

The Oriental Seminary is a state government Sponsored school in Kolkata.

== History ==
The Oriental Seminary was established in 1829 by the educator Gour Mohan Addy. It was the first privately-run, first-rate school for Hindus (the children of Hindus)Hindu parents in Calcutta (now known as Kolkata). It was open only to boys of Hindu parents. It was possibly India's first fully private school, as even Hindu School, Hindu College, and Hare school had to abide by certain government guidelines.

In earlier days, students wanting to study English had to go to the missionary schools, where they were subject to substantial religious influence. The establishment of a school for learning English free from religious influences was a major contribution of Addy. Traditional Indian education centres which taught Sanskrit and/or Persian had started fading out.

== The founder and teachers ==
Gour Mohan Addy (20 January 1805 – 3 March 1846) founded the school without government funding. He appointed teachers to each class level by their ethnicity: Eurasian teachers for junior classes, Bengali teachers for intermediate classes, and Englishmen or Bengalis for upper levels. He died in a boating accident on the Hooghly river, when returning from a trip to Serampore to hire a teacher.

Currently the principal of the primary section is Rina Basak Halder.

== Notable alumni ==
Oriental Seminary was the earliest school Rabindranath Tagore attended. The first experience of school aroused in the youngster the yearning to be a teacher. Wielding a stick, he used to teach from the railings in the big veranda of the palatial Jorasanko Thakur Bari.

Among the list of other notable alumni are Bhaktisiddhanta Sarasvati, Krishnadas Pal, Girish Chandra Ghosh, Womesh Chandra Bonnerjee, Sir Gooroodas Banerjee, Sambhunath Pandit, Vishwanath Datta, Amrita Lal Basu, Akshay Kumar Datta, Sudhindranath Dutta, Jatindranath Sengupta, Swami Abhedananda, Bankim Ghosh, Malay Roy Choudhury and Mithun Chakraborty.
