= Hindoo Patriot =

English weekly newspaper in Calcutta, British India

Hindoo Patriot হিন্দু প্যাট্রিয়ট
- Type: Weekly (1853–1892); Daily (1892–)
- Owners: Madhusudhan Ray (1853–54); Girish Chandra Ghosh (1854–56) (1856–61); Kaliprasanna Singha (1861); Ishwar Chandra Vidyasagar (1861–62); Board of Trustees (1862–)
- Editor: Girish Chandra Ghosh (1853–55); Harish Chandra Mukherjee (1855–61); Girish Chandra Ghosh (1861); Krishnadas Pal (1861–1884); Rajkumar Sarbadhikari (1884–1911)
- Founded: 1853; 173 years ago
- Language: English
- Headquarters: Kolkata, Bengal Presidency, British India
- Circulation: c. 200 (pre-1857)

The Hindoo Patriot (Bengali: হিন্দু প্যাট্রিয়ট) was an English weekly published from Calcutta in the later half of the nineteenth century in Bengal.

== History ==
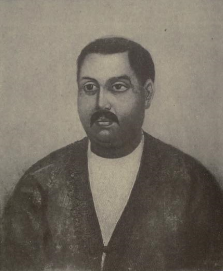
Girish Chandra Ghosh, the first editor of Hindoo Patriot.

In 1853, one Madhusudan Ray, a Burabazar banker approached Sreenath Ghosh, the founder editor of Bengal Recorder, and his brother Girish Chandra Ghosh to start an English newspaper. It was agreed that Bengal Recorder would be discontinued and Hindoo Patriot was chosen as the name for the new paper. The name is said to have been given by Girish Chandra Ghosh; although, according to the Reis and Rayyet, the name was given by Kshetra Chandra Ghosh, the youngest of the Ghosh brothers. Kristo Das Pal believed that the name was given by Harish Chandra Mukherjee. Manmathanath Ghosh, the grandson and biographer of Girish Chandra Ghosh, however, has refuted the latter claim and on the authority of Madhusudan Ray concluded that the name Hindoo Patriot was given by Girish Chandra Ghosh himself, citing that Harish Chandra Mukherjee had joined the Hindoo Patriot later and held a subordinate position in the initial years.

The Hindoo Patriot was first published on 6 January 1853 by Madhusudan Ray, under the editorship of Girish Chandra Ghosh. It began to be published every Thursday from Kalakar Street where Madhusudan Ray's press was located. In 1854, it was printed for some time from Cossitollah. Harish Chandra Mukherjee, the promising correspondent of Bengal Recorder, had joined Hindoo Patriot and gradually rose to the editorial board. In 1855, he became the chief editor of Hindu Patriot. A year later he bought the newspaper from Girish Chandra Ghosh in the name of his elder brother Haran Chandra Mukherjee. Girish Chandra Ghosh continued to write till 1858, when he left Hindoo Patriot to start another English newspaper named the Bengalee.

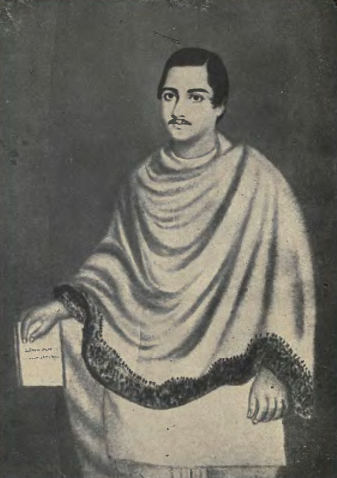
Kaliprasanna Sinha saved Hindoo Patriot from a financial ruin in 1861.

After the untimely death of Harish Chandra Mukherjee, The Hindoo Patriot was facing the grim prospect of a financial disaster. At that time Kaliprasanna Singha provided the necessary financial support and saved the paper from ruin. Girish Chandra Ghosh who had severed all ties with Hindoo Patriot three years ago, was moved by the plight of Harish Chandra Mukherjee's bereaved mother and helpless widow and took up the editorship again. After he left Hindoo Patriot again in November that year, the paper was bought over by Ishwar Chandra Vidyasagar. Krishnadas Pal became its new editor.

In 1865, the Indian Field an Indian-owned English weekly newspaper founded by Kishori Chand Mitra in 1859, merged with the Hindoo Patriot. After the death of Krishnadas Pal in 1884, Rajukumar Sarbadhikari became the new editor. It was largely due to his efforts that the Hindoo Patriot became a daily from 16 March 1892.

== Activism ==
=== 1857 revolt ===
During the revolt of 1857, the Hindoo Patriot used to publish stories of the revolt as the lead articles. He believed that the rebels had harmed their own cause by placing their trust in the leadership of Mughals, whom he described as the rotten house of Tamerlane. In 1859, when Tatya Tope was hanged, the Hindoo Patriot saluted his martyrdom and recognized the efforts of Lakshmi Bai and Kunwar Singh.

=== Indigo revolt ===
The Hindoo Patriot, under the able editorship of Harish Chandra Mukherjee became the mouthpiece of protest against imperial injustices. In the late fifties, the Hindoo Patriot began to expose the oppression and atrocities on Indian peasants by the indigo planters. The latter used to force the peasants into cultivating indigo.

In the late 1875, when one Jagadananda Mukherjee invited the Prince of Wales to his residence and zenana, the Hindoo Patriot commented that the national feeling had been outraged.

After the initial editorship of Girish Chandra Ghosh and Harish Chandra Mukherjee, Krishnadas Pal was the editor of the paper for 23 years. During this period he opposed the imperial laws like the Immigration Bill, the Vernacular Press Act and the Ilbert Bill through the columns of the Hindoo Patriot. He protested against the oppression of tea workers and termed the Immigration Bill as 'The Slave Law of India'.
