= Kristo Das Pal =

Nineteenth-century Indian journalist (1838–1884)

Kristo Das Pal কৃষ্ণদাস পাল
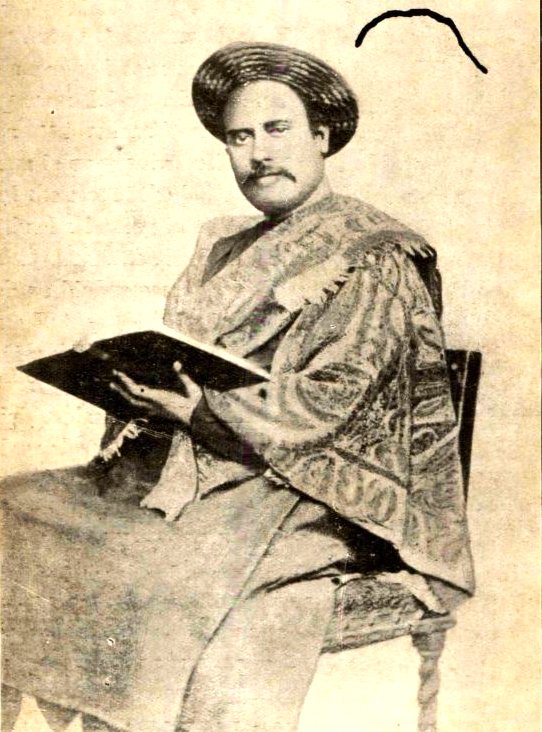
- Kristo Das Pal
- Born: 1838; Calcutta, Bengal Presidency, Company Raj
- Died: 24 July 1884 (aged 46); Calcutta, Bengal Presidency, British India
- Occupation: Journalist
- Parent: Ishwar Chandra Pal

Kristo Das Pal CIE (Bengali: কৃষ্ণদাস পাল; 1838 – 24 July 1884), was an Indian journalist, orator and an editor of the Hindoo Patriot.

== Early life ==
Son of Ishwar Chandra Pal, he received an English education at the Oriental Seminary and the Hindu Metropolitan College, and at an early age devoted himself to journalism. A student of D. L. Richardson, he acquired an admirable proficiency in English. In 1861, he was appointed assistant secretary (and afterwards secretary) to the British Indian Association, a board of Bengal landlords, which numbered among its members some of the most cultured men of the day. At about the same time he became editor of the Hindu Patriot, originally started in 1853 and conducted with ability and zeal by Harish Chandra Mukherjee until his death in 1861. This journal having been transferred by a trust deed to some members of the British Indian Association, it henceforth became to some extent an organ of that body. Thus Kristo Das Pal had rare opportunities for proving his abilities and independence during an eventful career of twenty-two years.

== Later life ==
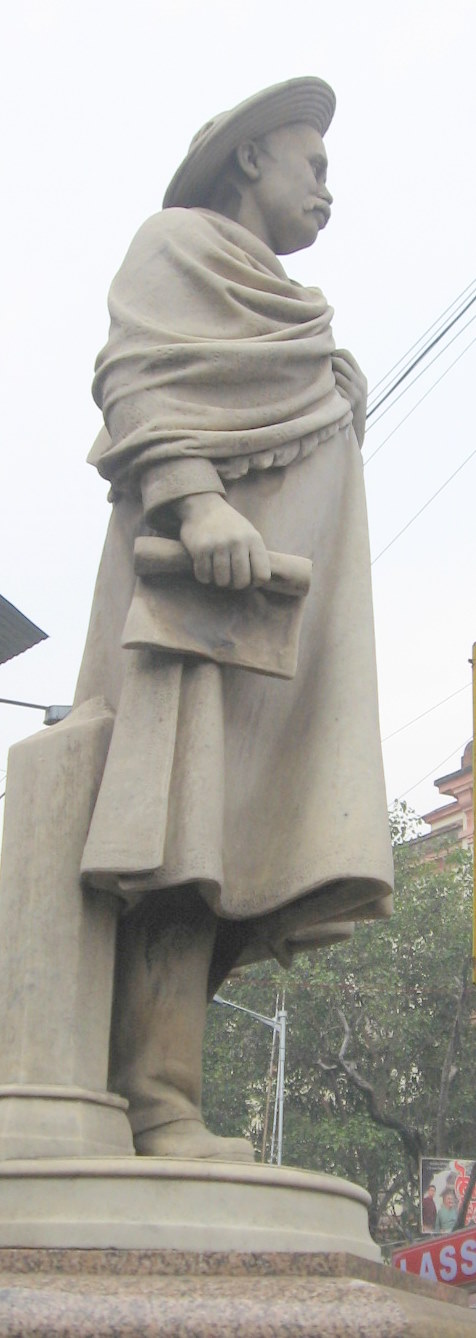
Statue of Kristo Das Pal at the crossing of College Street and Mahatma Gandhi Road

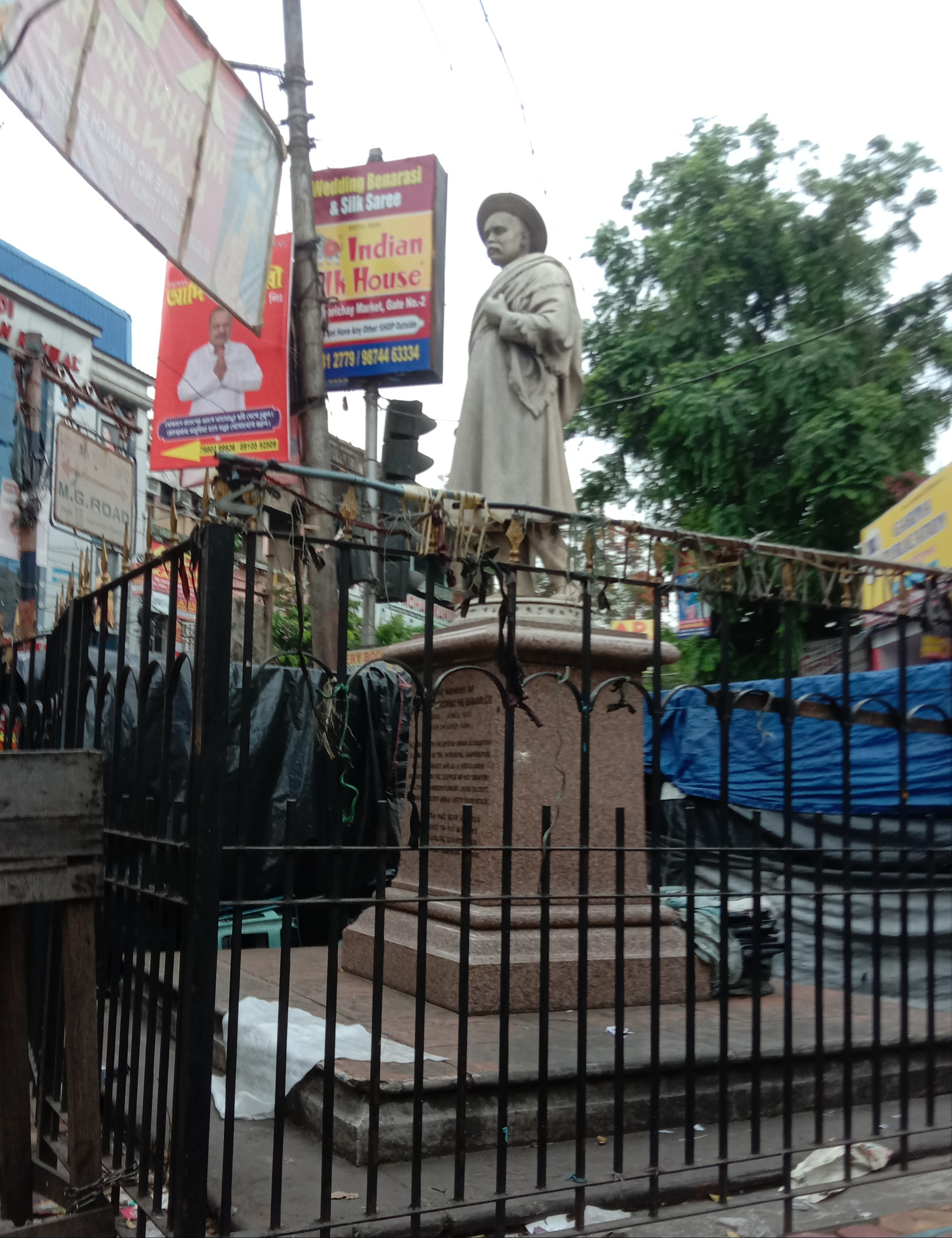
Statue of Kristo Das Pal in Kolkata, in May 2022.

In 1863, he was appointed justice of the peace and municipal commissioner of Calcutta. In 1872, he was made a member of the Bengal legislative council, where his practical good sense and moderation were much appreciated by successive lieutenant governors. His opposition, however, to the Calcutta Municipal Bill of 1876, which first recognized the elective system, was attributed to his prejudice in favour of the classes against the masses. In 1878, he received the decoration of C.I.E. In 1883 he was appointed a member of the viceroys legislative council. In the discussions on, the Rent Bill, which came up for consideration before the council, Kristo Das Pal, as secretary to the British Indian Association, necessarily took the side of the landlords. He was given title of Rai Bahadur in 1877 and was therefore also called as Rai Kristo Das Pal Bahadur.

He was one of the patrons of Hindu Mela

He died on 24 July 1884 from diabetes. Speaking after his death, Lord Ripon said: "By this melancholy event we have lost from among us a colleague of distinguished ability, from whom we had on all occasions received assistance, of which I readily acknowledge the value. . . . Mr. Kristo Das Pal owed the honourable position to which he had attained to his own exertions. His intellectual attainments were of a high order, his rhetorical gifts were acknowledged by all who heard him, and were enhanced when addressing this council by his thorough mastery over the English language." A full-length statue of him was unveiled by Lord Elgin at Calcutta in 1894.
