= Nabanna =

Bengali harvest festival

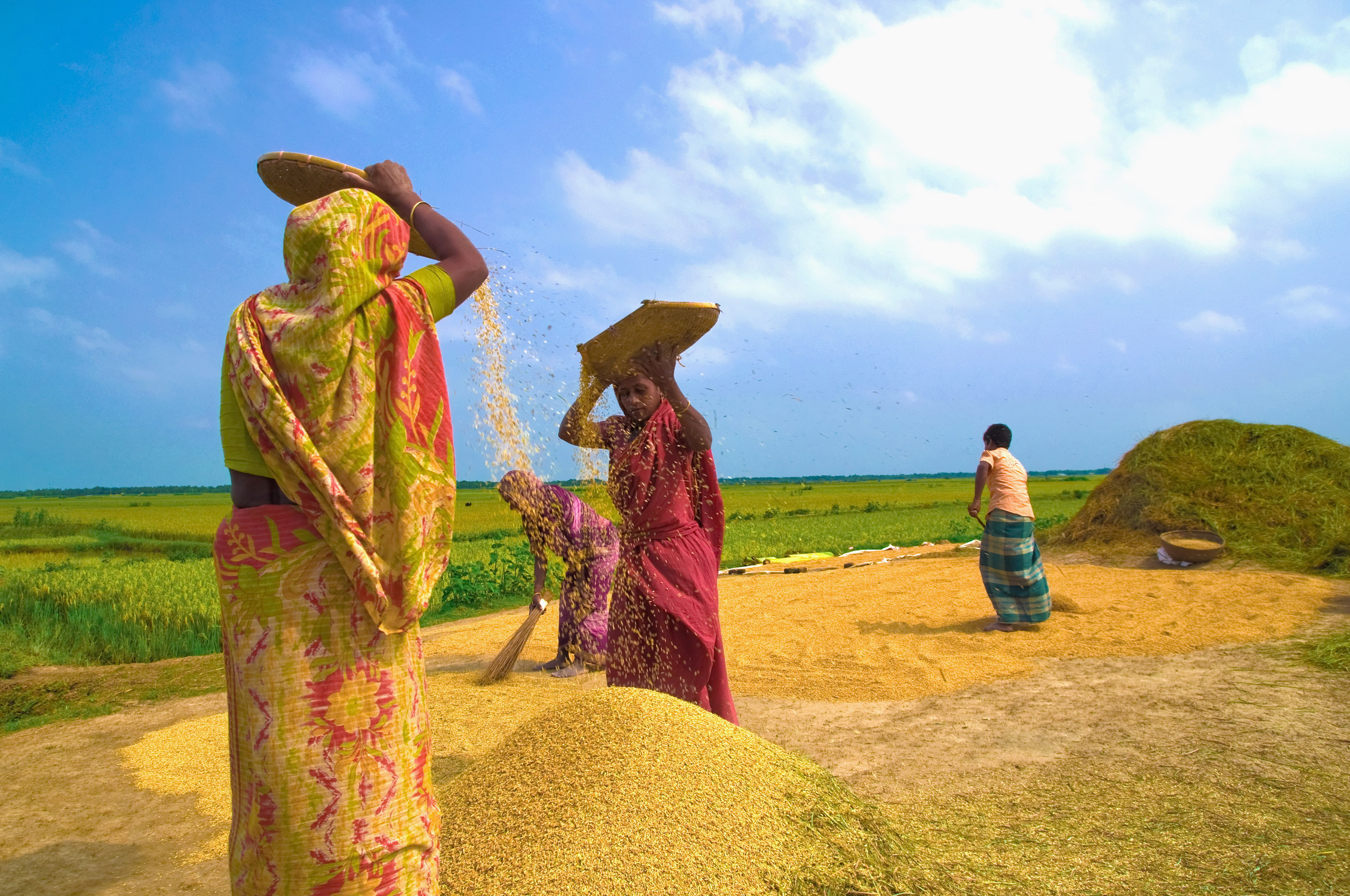
Harvesting preparation

Nobanno (Bengali: নবান্ন, Nobānno; lit: New Feast) is a Bengali harvest celebration usually celebrated with food and dance and music in Bangladesh and in the Indian states of West Bengal, Tripura, Assam's Barak Valley and Eastern parts of Jharkhand. It is a festival of food; many local preparations of Bengali cuisine like pitha are cooked.

== Celebration ==
The festival is celebrated with mela which are called Nabanna Mela. The villagers and locals from both the major religious groups join the festival with equal participation.

The festival gets a lot of support from the creative army of Bengali culture. Several poets, musicians, baul and painters flock to such mass gatherings. There is a famous play written on nabanna by Bijon Bhattacharya which depicts the sad incident of the great Bengal Famine of 1943.

In contemporary times, the Nabanna festival is celebrated annually on the first day of Agrahayan in Dhaka, organized by the Jatiya Nabanna Utshab Udjapan Parshad (National Harvest Festival Committee) since 1998. Shahriar Salam is the founder and main planner of the organisation. There are huge numbers of cultural activists, organisations & performing in a day long festival....

People from several villages of Howrah and even from other districts of West Bengal come here. People not only come to visit the Mela. In addition, they participate in many cultural programmes and competitions like 'Pithe Making' (Preparation of different sorts of Bengali Cakes), Seat-and Draw, Senior Citizens' Walking Competition, etc. An "Art-Camp" may attract creative minded people where artists from different states will participate. Some rare items of rural Bengal as "Dhenki" (Old-style Domestic Rice Mill), paddy of different varieties directly from the farmers' house are to be exhibited in the Exhibition ground. You can taste some delicious Bengali dishes like Pati-Sapta, Payesh (the latest addition is 'Vegetable Payesh'), Jilipipi (not Jilipi), etc. during the festival. Bengal's time-honoured culture and heritage will be presented to you in forms of Baul song, Chhou-dance, Jatra, Tarja, Kobi-gaan, etc. These artists come from different parts of the state to perform their talent and expertise in front of thousands of appreciative gatherings. Moreover, you can refurbish your collection of folk arts from the 'exhibition-cum-sale' stalls of handicrafts made by rural artisans.

== Social and cultural effects ==
Several dance and music forms have grown out of the ritual accompanied with the festival. Examples are Chhau, Bihu etc. Also the name nabanna is associated to several rural welfare projects and banks. It has also been associated with the Indian People's Theatre Association (IPTA) movement of Bengali theatre
