= Hootum Pyanchar Naksha =

1861 book by Kaliprasanna Singha

Hootum Pyanchar Naksha (lit. 'Sketches by a Watching Owl') is a book by Kaliprasanna Singha (1841–1870), first published in 1861. The book has been influential in Bengali literature. It reflects the tension that arose within several areas of Bengali society, especially in Calcutta. Factors contributing to this tension included the rise in conversions to Christianity, the emergence of Brahmoism, and the ideologies of social reform adopted by the reformers of the mid-nineteenth century. Hootum Pyanchar Naksha gives expression to these changes, conveying with irony and bawdy humor how the old and the new coexist in Calcutta.

The first English translation of this book was published in 2008.
