= Mahesh Chandra Bhattacharyya =

Mahesh Chandra Bhattacharya
- Born: 1 December 1858; Bitghar, Brahmanbaria, Bengal Presidency, British India (Now Bangladesh)
- Died: 10 February 1944 (aged 85); Calcutta, British India
- Occupation: Homeopathic medicine Business
- Known for: Social works
- Spouse: Harasundari Bhattacharya

Mahesh Chandra Bhattacharya (1 December 1858 – 10 February 1944) was a Bengali businessperson, dealing in Homeopathic medicines.

== Early life ==
Mahesh Chandra Bhattacharya was born on 1 December 1858 at Bitghar, Comilla in Bengal Presidency during British rule in India (now in Nabinagar upazila, Brahmanbaria District, Bangladesh). His father Ishwar Chandra Tarka Siddhanta was a scholar and his mother Rammala Devi was a devout woman. Mahesh was influenced by the virtues in his parents. Due to poverty, he could not get institutional education; rather studied at home.

== Career ==
In 1883, he came to Calcutta and founded M. Bhattacharyya & Co. in 1889 to sell homeopathy and allopathy medicines. Later, he opened branches in Comilla and Dhaka.

By practicing austerities, Mahesh Chandra carried out the philanthropic activities as well. He devoted for social welfare activities particularly for spending education. In the memory of his father, he established Ishwar Pathshala for the poor in Comilla town in 1914. Besides, he established Rammala Library and Rammala Hostel at Shaktola of Comilla town in 1912 and 1916 respectively in memory of his mother. The library was considered as the Lighthouse of undivided India. By his initiative, Nivedita Girls' School and Nivedita Girls' Hostel were established in Comilla for fostering women´s education. In his own village, he established the Shiksha Sangsad. He also established Iswhar Patshala Tol at Kashidham in Varanasi, India.

In order to mitigate the scarcity of drinking water in those days, he dug pond in his own village. While in a pilgrimage, he helped the famine stricken people at Baidyanath. At that time, he used to serve food to around 400 to 500 people daily. During the winter, he used to distribute clothes to the poor. For the convenience of the travelers, he set up a passenger-hostel named by Kalighat Hostel at Calcutta in 1935, where the passengers could stay for 4/5 days on gratis. He set up a Dharmasala after the name of his wife Harashundari Devi in Varanasi.

Like distinguished persons, namely Mahendralal Sarkar, Brajendranath Bandyopadhyay, Akshay Kumar Datta and Batakrishna Pal of Bengal, he used to spend a great portion of his income from the business towards selfless help and empathy towards the poor in the form of treatment, free distribution of drugs and other materials ways.

== Bibliography ==
He published four books for Homeopathic treatments in Bengali, English and other Indian languages and wrote a biography "Atmakatha" (My Life). The books in Bengali language are;

- Parbarik Chikitsa
- Streerog Chikitsa
- Homeopathic Olaotha Chikitsa
- Paribarik Bhesajtatwa

== Honour ==
In his memory with the contribution from his family firm M Bhattacharya & Co Pvt Ltd, 'Mahesh Bhattacharya Homeopathic Medical College & Hospital' was established in 1967 in Howrah (West Bengal). The 'Bitghar Danbeer Mahesh Chandra Vidyapith' at his native place in Bangladesh has been upgraded to a College.

== Death ==
Mahesh Bhattacharya died on 10 February 1944 at Varanasi, British India at the age of 86.
