= Tarja (folk poetry contest) =

Tarja (তর্জা) is a form of folk poetry contest from Bengal with a long tradition. Historically it used to be performed in the village gathering around a chandimandap or altar for village god, mela and other social events, in streets, and marketplace religious festivals. The themes of the contest are usually taken from Ramayana, Mahabharata or Puranas the poets sings their part in the form of doggerels and the other participant has to guess the meaning of it. During the rising bhadralok population of the Bengal Renaissance many of these clubs as well as jhumur clubs had been destroyed on the basis of its obscene content.

An example of a tarja couplet will be like:

Maagi minsheke chit kore fele diye buke diyechhe paa
Aar chokhta kare jhulur jhulur, mukhe neiko raa

This literally translates as "the hussy has thrown the bloke flat on his back, with her foot on his chest/ wordless she stands glaring in anger". The answer to this puzzle will be the goddess Kali and the legend connected to her. The answerer to this will also sing out their answer in a poem made at that instant of time.

== As an art form ==
The music grown out of this poetry contest has a particular flavour in it. It is also highly conntected to the other similar forms like jhumur, tappa and has contributed to a degree to the music of Bengal.
