= Nil Darpan =

Famous Bengali Language Play

Nil Darpan (Bengali: নীল দর্পণ, The Indigo Mirror) is a Bengali-language play written by Dinabandhu Mitra in 1858–1859. The play was essential to Nil Vidroha, better known as the Indigo Revolt of February–March 1859 in Bengal, when farmers refused to sow indigo in their fields to protest against exploitative working conditions during the period of Company rule. It was also essential to the development of theatre in Bengal and influenced Girish Chandra Ghosh, who in 1872 would establish the National Theatre in Calcutta (Kolkata), where the first play ever commercially staged was Nildarpan.

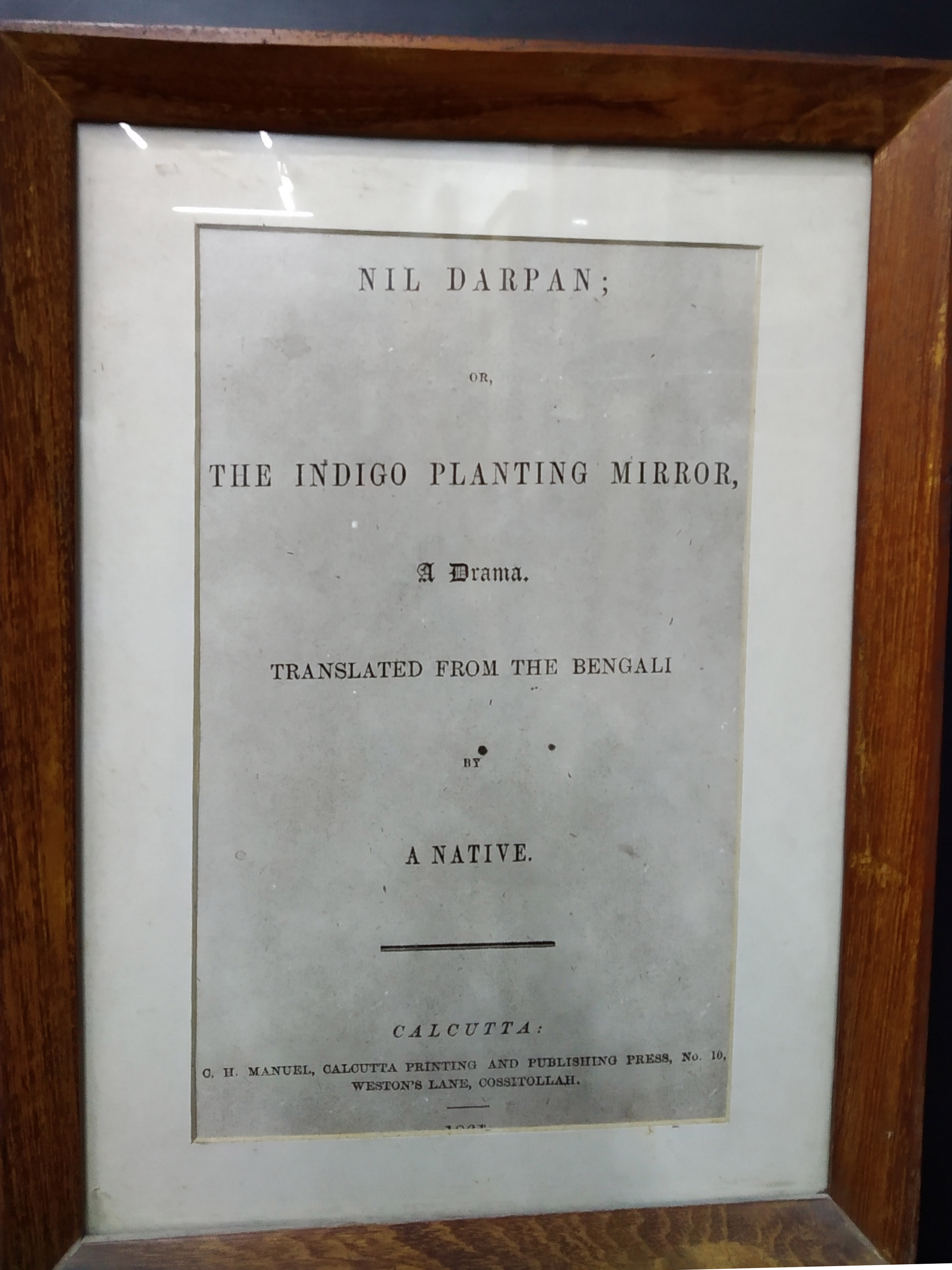
Nil Darpan

== Critical summary ==
The play was received with mixed results upon its release. It was allegedly translated by Michael Madhusudan Dutta and published by Reverend James Long, for which he was sentenced to prison and charged with criminal libel.

I present "The Indigo Planting Mirror" to the Indigo Planters' hands; now, let every one of them, having observed his face, erase the freckle of the stain of selfishness from his forehead, and, in its stead, place on it the sandal powder of beneficence, then shall I think my labour success...

It is evident from this wish that it was a piece meant to raise a voice among the elite intellectuals of Kolkata so that the farmers' revolt would be integrated with the urban thinkers. Unlike the Sepoy Revolt, the Indigo Revolt was effectively a revolt integrating the whole population of Bengalis with no distance kept between the several classes of society, which can be attributed to the effort by Mitra, Rev. James Long, and Michael Madhusudan Dutt.

Indian literature has a long-standing tradition of drama writing. For almost a millennium the only form of literature other than odes was drama. The distinction of Sanskrit drama by luminaries like Kalidasa was strong enough to keep audiences absorbed for centuries. But a dawn was coming by the mid-1800s in Bengal where the Bengal Renaissance saw the rise in western education and ideas, and therefore the styles of new forms of literature were seeping in. For example, Ram Narayan Tarkaratna (1823–1885) had already left the Sanskrit tradition and started writing social realism. The drama is markedly different from the earlier dramas of that period; notably, the first modern drama written in Bengali by Ram Narayan still had the old sadhu bhasa, the artificial Sanskritised dialect of modern Bengali as the writing medium.

The characters in the drama are the villagers and the indigo planters who have the money and the law in their hand.

== Characters ==
Male characters

- Golok Chandra Basu, a rich farmer. (গোলক চন্দ্র বসু, একজন সম্পন্ন চাষি)
- Nobin Madhab, son of Golok Chandra Basu. (নবীন মাধব, গোলক বসুর বড় ছেলে)
- Bindu Madhab, son of Golok Chandra Basu. (বিন্দু মাধব, গোলক বসুর ছোট ছেলে)
- Sadhu Charan, a neighbouring Ryot. (সাধু চরণ, গোলকের প্রতিবেশি রাইয়ত)
- Ray Charan, Sadhu's brother. (রাই চরণ, সাধু চরণের ছোট ভাই)
- Gopinath, The Dewan. (গোপীনাথ, নীলকরের দেওয়ান)
- Torap, A heroic figure.(তোরাপ, একজন প্রতিবাদী চরিত্র)
- Indigo planters. (নীলকর) :
- J. J. Wood. (জে জে ঊড, প্রধান নীলকর)
- P. P. Rose J. (পি পি রোজ, উডের ছেলে)
- The Amin or Land measurer. (জমির পরিমাপকারী)
- A Khalasi, a Tent-pitcher. (আমিন খালাসী, নীল সংগ্রাহক)
- Tadagir, Native Superintendent of Indigo Cultivation.
- Magistrate, Amla, Attorney, Deputy Inspector, pundit, Keeper of the Gaol, Doctor, a Cow-keeper, a Native Doctor, Four Boys, a Latyal or Club-man, and a Herdsman.

Female characters

- Sabitri, Wife of Golok chandra basu(সাবিত্রী, গোলক বসুর স্ত্রী)
- Soirindri, Wife of Nobin. (সৈরিন্দ্রী, নবীন মাধবের স্ত্রী)
- Saralota, Wife of Bindu Madhab. (সরলতা, বিন্দু মাধবের স্ত্রী)
- Reboti, Wife of Sadhu Charan. (রেবতী, সাধু চরণের স্ত্রী)
- Khetromani, Daughter of Sadhu & Reboti. (ক্ষেত্রমনি, সাধুচরণ ও রেবতীর মেয়ে)
- Aduri, Maid-servant in Gokul Chunder's house. (আদুরি, গোলকের বাড়ির কাজের মেয়ে)
- Podi Moyrani, a Sweetmeat maker. (পদী ময়রানী, বিনোদনকারিনী, রোগ সাহেবের সহচরী)

== Legacy ==
The legacy of black humor in the play is well shared by contemporary dramatists like Michael Madhusudan Dutt, Girish Chandra Ghosh and Ardhendu Sekhar Mustafi. It was also important in development of the chalit bhasa, or colloquial dialect, which is free of the Sanskrit-influenced sadhu bhasa.

== The trial of James Long ==
The proceedings of the trial of Reverend Mr. James Long first appeared in the second Edition (India) of the English version of the play, Nil Darpan (also transliterated as Neel Darpan or Nil Durpan). It included all the relevant documents and comments of the Indian-language and Anglo-Indian newspapers. It was published in 1903 by Messrs A. N. Andini and Co., Calcutta. Mr. Kumud Bihari Bose compiled it under the title: "The Trial of the Rev. James Long and the Drama of Nil Durpan," subtitled "Indigo Planters and all about them." The play dealt with the upheaval between the indigo planters and Indian ryots in different parts of Bengal, Bihar, and U.P. This conflict gave rise to the rift and division between the different classes of the society and between the different sections of the government as well.

== Background of the trial of the play Nil Darpan ==
James Long criticized the colonial authorities and the European mercantile community for provoking the revolt by their treatment of the indigo cultivators. His view concurred that of Dinabandhu Mitra, who expressed his sentiments in a play entitled Nil Darpan (the original Bengali play was written by him) and published anonymously in Dhaka in 1860. Mitra sent Long a copy of the play as early as 1861. Long brought it to the notice of W.S. Seton-Karr, Secretary to the Governor of Bengal and ex-President of the Indigo Commission. Seton-Karr, sensing its importance, mentioned Nil Durpan in conversation with Lieutenant Governor Grant. Grant expressed a wish to see a translation of it and to print a few copies to be circulated privately among friends. After the discussion, Seton-Karr asked Long to arrange for a translation of the play in English. Michael Madhusudan Dutta translated it under the supervision of Long. Long, as the editor, cut out some coarse passages and wrote a short prefatory note for the play. When the translation was complete, Seton-Karr ordered the printing of five hundred copies in lieu of Grant's wish of a few copies. Then Long sent the translated manuscripts to Clement Henry Manuel, the proprietor of the Calcutta Printing and Publishing Press, to print five hundred copies, and the cost came to around Rs. 300. It was published in April or May 1861. Unknown to the Lieutenant Governor, Long began sending out the copies in official government envelopes that had the heading: "On her Majesty's Service". The translation revealed the nature of the oppression against the indigo workers. It naturally offended the establishment so much that the Anglo-Indian press started raising propaganda against the publisher and the translator. One of the leading newspapers named The Englishman and some indigo planters instituted a libel suit against Long and the printer C. H. Manuel. The words mentioned in Long's introduction to the play stated that what was presented in it was "plain but true". This was subsequently used by the planters in their prosecution of Long for publishing defamatory statements.

Counsel (acting on Long's advice) named Long as the one responsible, as Long had given Manuel a copy of the play for publication. The planters filed for only nominal damages, even as they had decided to prosecute Long for libel in a criminal suit.

Friday, 19 July 1861 was fixed as the first date for the trial and it lasted from then to 24 July at the Calcutta Supreme Court. It was regarded as the first "state trial of India under the Empire". Mr. Peterson and Mr. Cowie were prosecuted. Mr. Eglinton and Mr. Newmarch appeared on behalf of the defendant. Sir Mordunt Wells presided as the judge.

It is true that it becomes difficult to censor any literary work when it becomes so available in the public domain. That is why it became very urgent to find out the list of people who had the books after its printing. The issue of finding out the list was the concern for the first day of trial on 19 July 1861. The list submitted at the trial contained the number of copies that had been issued was said to be two hundred and two.

The agenda for the days of 20 to 24 July was to justify the two counts brought against James Long. The first count referred to libel or a supposed libel against the two leading newspapers named the Englishman and Hurkaru published in Kolkata. These two papers were alluded to in the preface of the play Nil Durpan:

The Editors of two daily newspapers are filling their columns with your praises; and whatever other people may think, you never enjoy pleasure from it, since you know fully the reason of their so doing. What surprising power of attraction silver has! The detestable Judas gave the great preacher of the Christian religion, Jesus and others, into the hands of Odious Pilate for the sake of thirty rupees; what wonder then, if the proprietors of two newspapers, becoming enslaved by the hope of gaining one thousand rupees, throw the poor helpless of this land into the terrible grasp of your mouths.

Being aggrieved, Mr. Brett, the managing proprietor and formerly joint editor of the Englishman, brought a criminal prosecution against James Long. He claimed that the implied meanings of the allusions were defamatory because the extract indicates they wrote for reward from the indigo planters and not otherwise.

The second count, which concerned the interests of the society at large, was the alleged libel against that portion of the community called the indigo planters of Lower Bengal.

Sir Mordunt Wells accused Long of slandering European women in Nil Durpan: the question of shame was brought up through the episode of a woman riding on horseback with the magistrate of the zillah through the village, as well as injuring the reputation of every European in the country by calling them Planter or Civilian or Soldier. The fictitious characters named Mr. Wood and Mr. Rose in the play represent the indigo planters. This also became a reason for attacking Long.

== Bibliography ==
- Dinabandhu Mitra: Nil Durpan or the Indigo Planting Mirror, translated by Michael Madhusudan Dutt, edited by Sudhi Pradhan and Sailesh Sen Gupta (Calcutta: Paschimbanga Natya Academy, 1997)
- Geoffrey A. Oddie, chapter Eight, The Aftermath: Nil Durpan, Trial and Imprisonment, Missionaries, Rebellion and Proto-Nationalism: James Long of Bengal 1814–87 (London: Routledge, 1999)
- Nurul Hossain Choudhury, "James Rev. Long", Banglapedia.
