= James Long (priest) =

Anglo-Irish priest, missionary and philanthropist

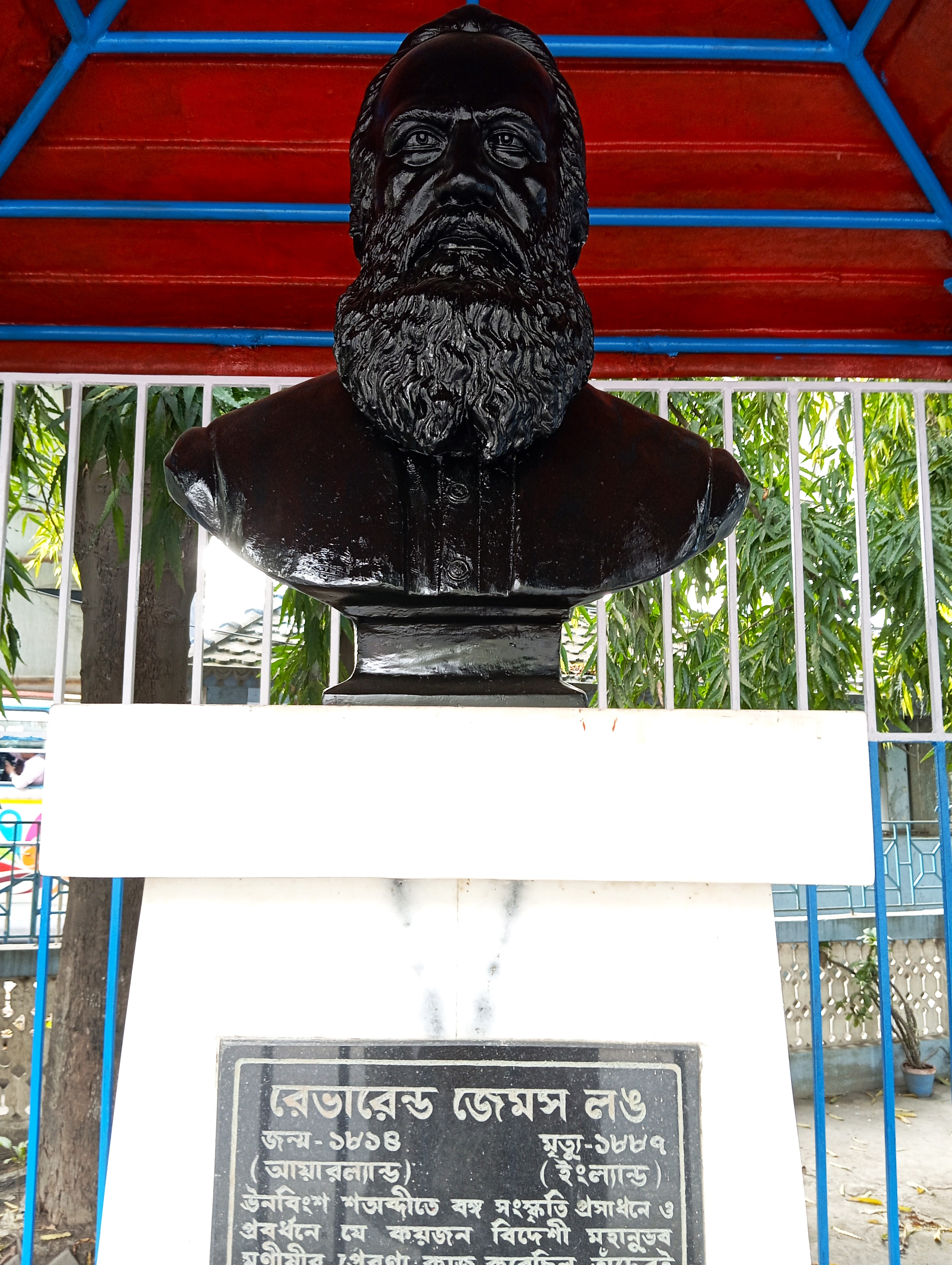
Statue of James Long on James Long Sarani, Kolkata, West Bengal

James Long (1814–1887) was an Anglo-Irish priest of the Anglican Church. A humanist, educator, evangelist, translator, essayist, philanthropist and a missionary to India, he resided in the city of Calcutta, India, from 1840 to 1872 as a member of the Church Missionary Society, leading the mission at Thakurpukur.

Long was closely associated with the Calcutta School-Book Society, the Bethune Society, the Bengal Social Science Association and The Asiatic Society. He also published the English translation of the play Nil Darpan by Dinabandhu Mitra, an act for which he was subsequently prosecuted for libel, fined, and briefly jailed.

== Early life ==
James Long was born in Bandon, County Cork, Ireland in 1814, when Ireland was still a part of the United Kingdom, to John Long and his wife Anne. At the age of twelve he was enrolled at the newly opened Bandon Endowed School, where he learnt "Hebrew, Greek, Latin, French and English languages; Euclid, Algebra, Logic; Arithmetic, Book-keeping, Reading, Writing, History and Geography". He proved an excellent student, distinguishing himself especially in theology and the classics.

Long's application to join the Church Missionary Society was accepted in 1838 and he was sent to the Church Missionary Society College, Islington. Following two years training at Islington the Reverend Long was sent to Calcutta to join the CMS mission there. He arrived in Calcutta in 1840, briefly returning to England in 1848 to marry Emily Orme, daughter of William Orme.

== Calcutta and Thakurpukur ==
From 1840 to 1848, Long taught at the school for non-Christian students run by the CMS at its premises located on Amherst Street. Returning to India a married man in 1848, he was placed in charge of the CMS mission in Thakurpukur, at the time a hamlet a day's journey out of Calcutta in the Bengal Presidency. By 1851, Long had set up a vernacular school for boys in Thakurpukur, while his wife Emily ran a corresponding school for girls. In an 1854 letter to F. J. Halliday of the Council of Education, he boasts a roll-call of "about 100 boys, Hindu, Mussulman, and Christians." His work Bengali Proverbs (1851) has been called a significant addition to Bengali literature. He studied Bengali proverbs and folk literature for another two decades, publishing A Catalogue of Bengali Newspapers and Periodicals from 1818 to 1855 (1855), and the Descriptive Catalogue of Vernacular Books and Pamphlets which was forwarded by the Government of India to the Paris Exposition of 1867 .

=== The Nil Darpan affair ===
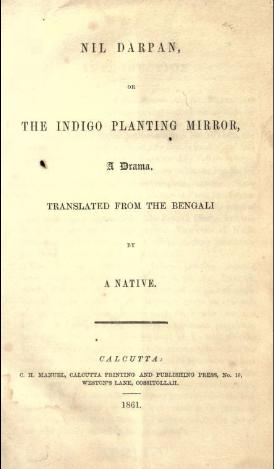
Title page of Long's edition of the English Nil Darpan

In 1861, at the height of the Indigo revolt by the ryots in Bengal, Long received a copy of the Bengali play Nil Darpan (also transcribed as Neel Darpan or Nil Durpan) from its author Dinabandhu Mitra, who had been one of Long's students at the CMS school on Amherst Street. The play, published anonymously the previous year in Dacca, was sympathetic to the abject condition of the ryots or labourers on indigo plantations and critical of European planters for their treatment of indigo cultivators. Long brought it to the notice of Walter Scott Seton-Karr, Secretary to the Governor of Bengal and ex-President of the Indigo Commission. Seton-Karr, sensing its importance, mentioned Nil Durpan in conversation with the Lieutenant Governor, John Peter Grant. Grant then expressed a wish to see a translation of it and print a few copies to be circulated privately amongst friends. Long had it anonymously translated into English "By A Native" (Long refused to divulge the name of the translator to the trial court; Bankim Chandra Chattopadhyay later attributed the translation to Michael Madhusudan Dutt, although this attribution remains contentious) and printed in either April or May 1861. In his introduction to the play, he wrote that "[i]t is the earnest wish of the writer of these lines that harmony may be speedily established between the Planter and the Ryot..." Long sent the translated manuscript to Clement Henry Manuel, the proprietor of the Calcutta Printing and Publishing Press, to print five hundred copies at the cost of some three hundred rupees. Unknown to the Lieutenant Governor, Long began sending out copies in official Government envelopes to prominent Europeans both in India and abroad that had the heading: "on her Majesty’s Service."

The circulation of the play "generated hostility from indigo planters, who brought a lawsuit against Long on the charges that the preface of the play slandered the editors of the two pro-plantation newspapers, the Englishman and the Bengal Hurkaru, and that the text of the drama brought the planters a bad name." As soon as the planters noticed the circulation of the play, W. F. Fergusson, the Secretary of the Landholders' and Commercial Association, wrote to the Governor of Bengal. He inquired as to which parties had sanctioned the play and whether the authority of the Bengal Government had given permission to publish it. He also threatened those who had circulated "foul and malicious libel on indigo planting, evoking sedition and breaches of the peace". He wrote that they must be prosecuted "with an utmost rigour of the law". The Lieutenant Governor replied that some officials had caused the offence; the planters, unsatisfied with the answer, decided to institute legal proceedings with a view to ascertain the authors and publishers of the Nil Durpan. The words mentioned in Long’s Introduction to the play stated that what was presented in it was "plain but true"; this was subsequently used by the planters in their prosecution of Long for publishing defamatory statements. C. H. Manuel, whose name was mentioned as printer of Nil Durpan, was indicted in the Calcutta Supreme Court on 11 June 1861. He pleaded guilty, and his counsel (acting on Long’s advice) named Long as his employer in the matter of publishing.

Long's trial lasted from 19 to 24 July 1861, at the Calcutta Supreme Court. Mr. Peterson and Mr. Cowie prosecuted, Mr. Eglinton and Mr. Newmarch appeared on behalf of the defendant, and Sir M.L. Wells presided as judge. Wells found Long guilty of libel, fined him one thousand rupees and sentenced him to one month’s imprisonment, which he served in the period of July–August 1861. Kaliprasanna Singha paid the fine on Long's behalf.

== Later life and legacy ==
Following three years of home leave following the indigo controversy, Rev. and Mrs Long returned to Calcutta. Mrs Long died of amoebic dysentery while on a voyage back to England in February 1867. After her death, Long shared a house in Calcutta with the Rev. Krishna Mohan Banerjee, a longtime friend and associate who had lost his wife the same year. Together the two men hosted joint Indo-British soirees—rare events during the colonial era—and generally sought to foster a rapprochement between the Anglo-Indian community and Indians. Guests included Bishop George Cotton and Keshub Chunder Sen among others.

As Long continued his educational work, he developed a keen interest in Russia, which he visited for the first time in 1863, and twice after his retirement in 1872. In a paper written by Long titled Russia, Central Asia, and British India and published in London in 1865, he wrote of his optimism about the prospects of serf emancipation, and criticized prevailing attitudes of paranoia towards Russia in light of (from Long's point of view) the valuable role carried out by Russian government and of the Eastern Orthodox Church in propagating Christianity in Central Asia to serve as a bulwark against Islam.

In 1872, Reverend James Long retired from the Church Missionary Society and left India for good. He lived for the rest of his life in London, where he continued to write and publish until his death on 23 March 1887. Long set up a posthumous endowment called the Long Lectureship in Oriental Religions in 1885, for the appointment of one or more lecturers annually to deliver lectures at certain centres of education in Britain.

Rev. Long lends his name to James Long Sarani, a major thoroughfare running through Thakurpukur.
