= British Indian Association =

Political organization in the 19th century India

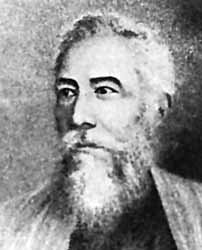

The British Indian Association was a political organization in the 19th century in India. Its rival was the Indian National Association.

The Madras Native Association founded by Merchant Billionaire Gazulu Lakshmi Narslu Chetty in 1854 had established close ties with this Association in the interests of Native Indians

== History ==
The British Indian Association was established on 29 October 1851 in Kolkata, India with Radhakanta Deb as its first President. The first general secretary of the association was Debendranath Tagore. The association was exclusively composed of Indians and it worked towards increasing the welfare of Indians. Its members included Kristo Das Pal, Peary Chand Mitra, and Ramgopal Ghosh.

The British Indian Association placed a number of demands before the British parliament that included education of Indians, removing monopoly of the East India Trading Company, support for Indian manufacturers, and inclusion of Indians in the civil service. Their demands would later be adopted by the Indian National Congress.The British Indian Association ceased operations in 1954 when the Zamindari system was abolished in India.
