= Harish Chandra Mukherjee =

Indian journalist (1824 – 1861)

Harish Chandra Mukherjee ( 24 July 1824 – 16 June 1861) was an Indian journalist. He was the editor of the Hindoo Patriot weekly.

== Biography ==
Mukherjee was born in 1824 in Bhowanipore near Calcutta. He was the younger of the two sons of his father, Ram Dhun Mukerji, by his third wife, Rukhhini Debi, and was brought up in the house of his maternal uncles. After studying in the Union School where he was admitted as a charity boy, he left school at the age of fourteen in search of employment.

== Works ==
He started his career by writing bills, letters, petitions, and translating Bengali documents to English. In 1848, he was selected to join in the office of the Military Auditor General. He was promoted from clerk to Assistant Military Auditor. In 1852, when he became a member of the British Indian Association, he read all the Regulation Laws in order to be able to carry on discussions on that subject with other members.

Harish Chandra began his journalism by writing to the Hindu Intelligencer and to the Englishman. In 1853, three brothers, Srinath Ghose, Girish Chunder Ghose and Khetna Chunder Ghose, started a newspaper called the Hindoo Patriot, which was issued under their joint editorship. They were assisted by Harish Chandra who later began editing the newspaper.

Harish Chandra edited the Hindoo Patriot. He supported the issue of widow remarriage and criticised the annexation policy of Lord Dalhousie. He defended the policy of Lord Canning during the Indian Rebellion of 1857. During the Indigo revolt of 1859, he stood by the side of the ryots, and exposed the oppression and high-handedness of the planters. His strong advocacy of the cause led to the appointment of the Indigo Commission to enquire into the grievances of the people. He was an important witness examined before the Commission, and he gave evidence in support of his position. In 1860, the Indigo planters instituted civil and criminal suits against him and immediately after his sudden death at the age of thirty-six, they succeeded in obtaining a decree.
