= Dinabandhu Mitra =

Indian writer and dramatist (1829-1873)

- দীনবন্ধু মিত্র
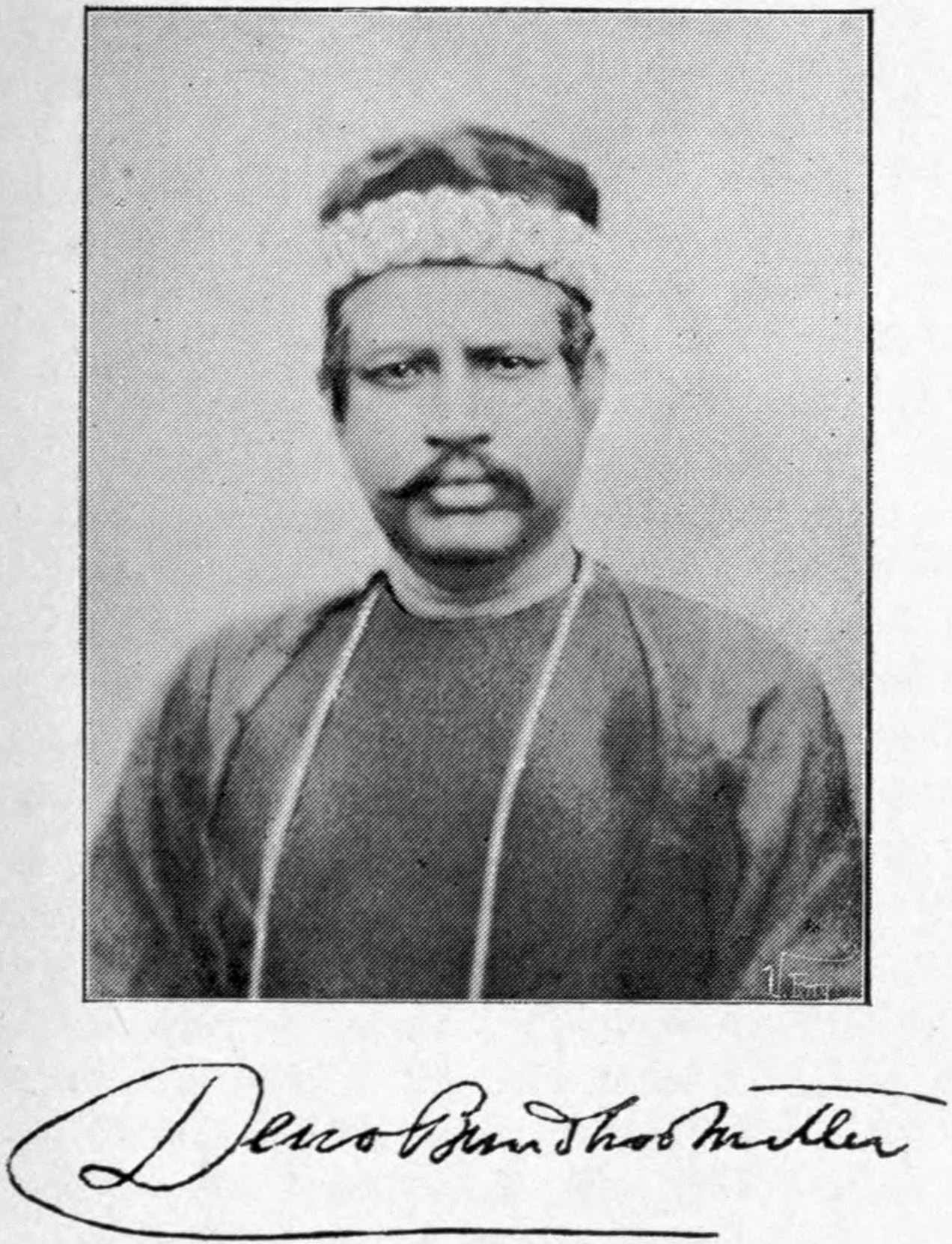
- Portrait and signature of Dinobandhu Mitra
- Born: Gandharva Narayan; 10 April 1829; Chowberia, Gopalnagar, North 24 Parganas, Bengal Presidency, British India
- Died: 1 November 1873 (aged 43–44); Calcutta, Bengal Presidency, British India
- Father: Kalachand Mitra
- Relatives: Nilmani Mitra (uncle)

Dinabandhu Mitra, also known as Denobhandhoo Mithra, (10 April 1829 – 1 November 1873) was a Bengali-language writer and dramatist. He is notable for his play Nil Darpan (1860).

== Early life ==
Dinabandhu Mitra was born at Chowberia village in Gopalnagar P.S., North 24 Parganas and was the son of Kalachand Mitra. His given name was Gandharva Narayan, but he changed it to Dinabandhu Mitra. His education started at a village pathshala. His father arranged a job for him on a zamindar's estate in 1840. But the small boy fled to Kolkata, where he started working in the house of his uncle, Nilmani Mitra. Around 1846, he was admitted to the free school run by James Long. Dinabandhu was a bright student and won a number of scholarships. In 1850, he enrolled in Hindu College and was awarded scholarships for academic excellence. However, he did not appear in his last examination, and, instead, started working as a postmaster in Patna in 1855. He served in various posts in the Postal Department in Krishnanagar, Nadia, Dhaka and Orissa. In 1870, he was made supernumerary postmaster in Serampore. In 1872, he joined the Indian Railways as an inspector.

== Literary career ==
Mitra started writing literary pieces while still at college. His poetic style was inspired by poet Ishwar Chandra Gupta. His poems were able to attract the attention of intellectuals at Kolkata, but his favourite genre was the drama. His work in the postal department had taken him to various parts of the country giving him opportunities to study human life closely and thereby adding to his ability to unfold the drama of life with a degree of realism unknown at that time. Among his books of poems are Suradhuni Kavya (first part appeared in 1871, second part appeared in 1876) and Dvadash Kavita (1872). His plays include Nil Darpan (1860), Nabin Tapasvini (1863), Biye Pagla Budo (1866), Sadhabar Ekadashi (1866), Lilavati (1867), Jamai Barik (1873) and Kamale Kamini (1873). He also wrote a novel titled Poda Mahehshvar. Another one of his noted contributions was Jamalaye Jibanta Manush (An Alive Man in the Abode of Yama), the basic storyline will later be adopted into film in the same name starring Bhanu Bandopadhyay and Basabi Nandi.

=== Nil Darpan ===
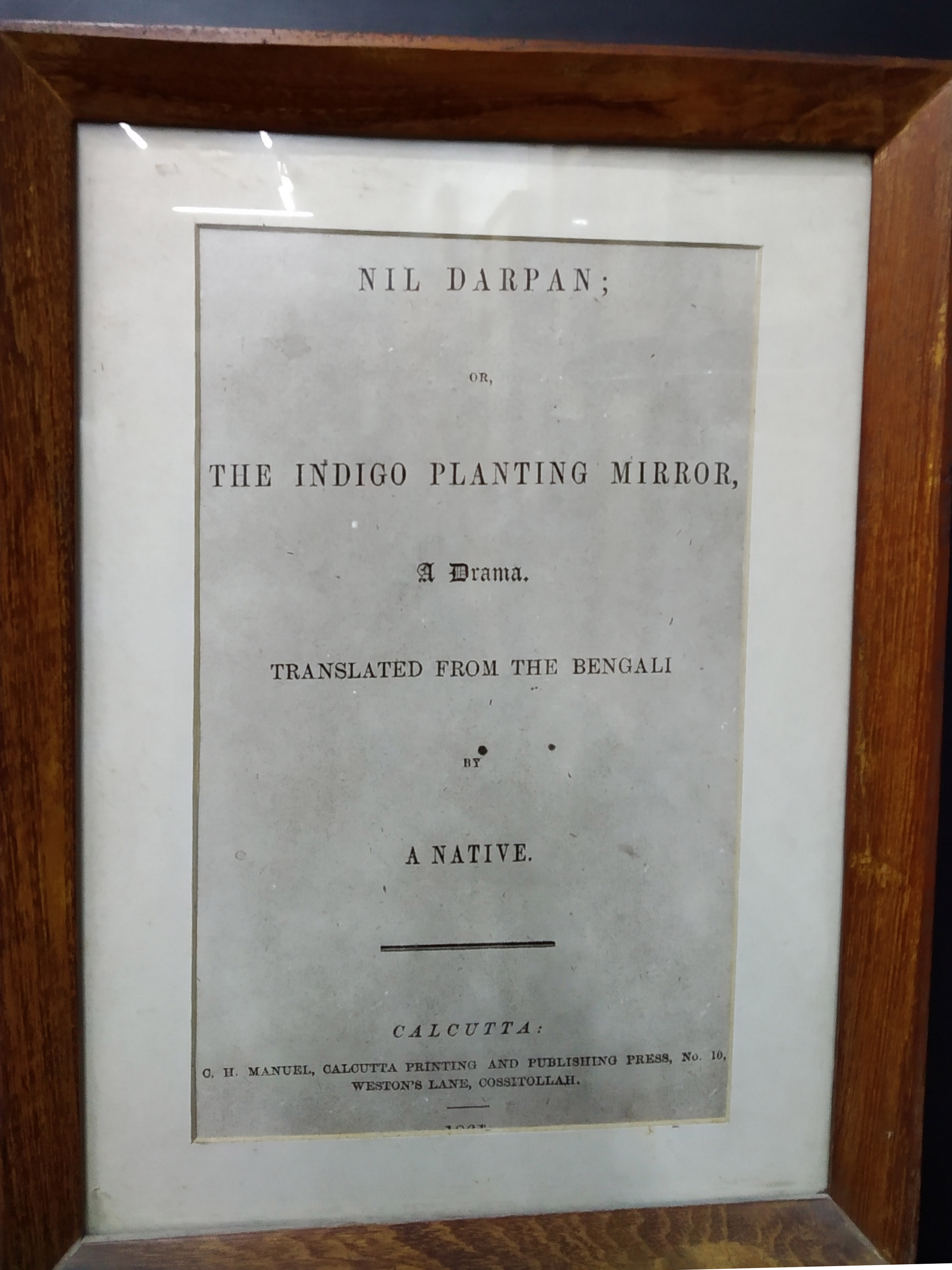
English translation of Nil Darpan.

Mitra's play Nil Darpan was about the plight of indigo farmers. Indigo revolt (1858) in Bengali was the revolt of the indigo farmers against the indigo planters. It was one year after the Sepoy Revolt, Bengal saw one more important revolt in its history. The play was published from Dhaka and soon after its publication it ignited a major argument in the newspapers. His first hand experience of the indigo cultivators, while on the job as the postmaster in rural Orissa and Bengal, were reflected in the drama. Michael Madhusudan Dutt translated the play into English immediately after it was published. and Reverend James Long published it. The play got wide publicity in Europe where it was translated into other languages. No other Bengali book at that time got so wide publicity at such large scale. It was so emotionally motivating that when the play was staged, the notable educator and reformer Iswar Chandra Vidyasagar was so taken in by the realism of the performance of Ardhendushekhar Mustafi (the actor playing the role of the indigo planter Mr Wood) that he threw a shoe at the actor. The actor accepted the shoe as a compliment.

A lawsuit was filed against Rev. Long on 19 July 1861 for libeling the editor of the Englishman and libeling the indigo planters. Rev. Long was fined a sum of 1000 Rs. and a month of time in jail, the fully packed court house were full with sympathy towards the Rev. and the dramatist. The fined sum was paid at the spot by author Kaliprasanna Singha. The court hearing against the indigo planters went for the next four years. Bankimchandra Chattopadhyay compared Nil Darpan to Uncle Tom's Cabin for its role in arousing people's awareness of the evils of indigo plantations.

== Later life and legacy ==
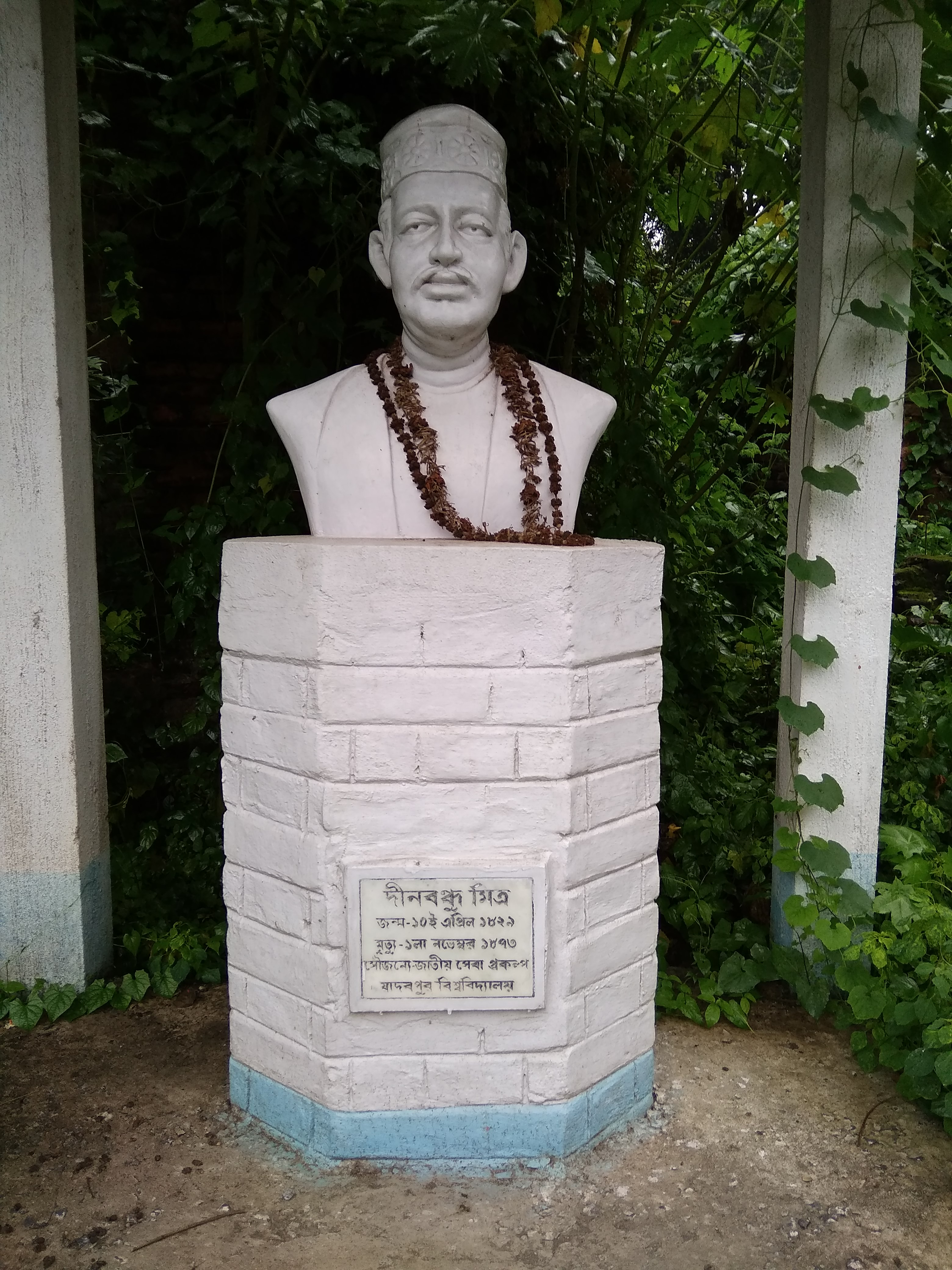
Bust of Mitra in Chouberia, Bongaon.

Mitra was awarded the title Rai Bahadur by the British Raj for services rendered at the Lushai Expedition. He was the matchmaker between Bankim Chandra Chatterjee and Rajlakshmi Devi. He died on 1 November 1873.

The college Dinabandhu Mahavidyalay (estd. 1947) is named after Mitra.
