= Girish Chandra Ghosh =

Bengali actor, director, and writer (1844–1912)

- Born: 28 February 1844; Baghbazar in Calcutta, Bengal Presidency, British India
- Died: 8 February 1912 (aged 67); Calcutta, Bengal Presidency, British India
- Education: Hare School
- Occupations: Actor, director, and writer
- Spouse: Pramodini Devi

Girish Chandra Ghosh (28 February 1844 – 8 February 1912) was a Bengali actor, director, and writer. He was largely responsible for the golden age of Bengali theatre. He cofounded the Great National Theatre, the first Bengali professional theatre company, in 1872; wrote nearly 40 plays and acted and directed many more; and later in life became a noted householder disciple of Sri Ramakrishna.

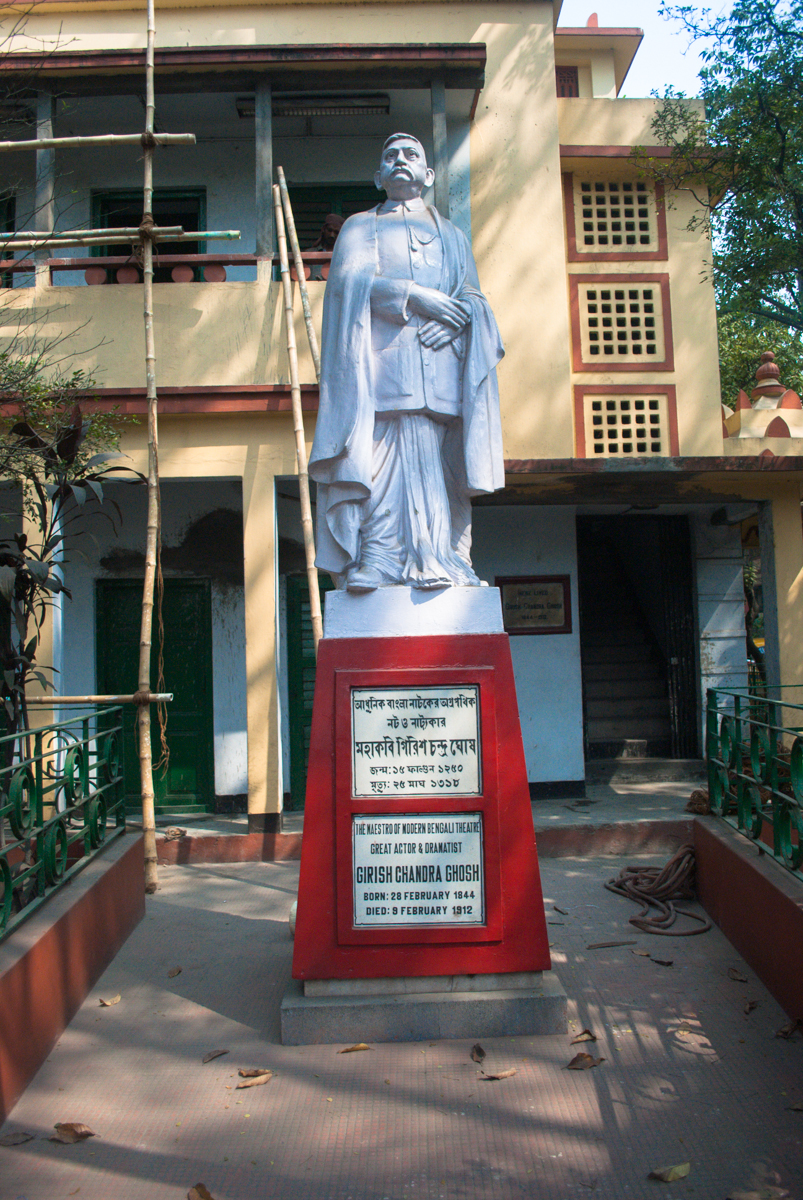
Home of Girish Ghosh

== Biography ==
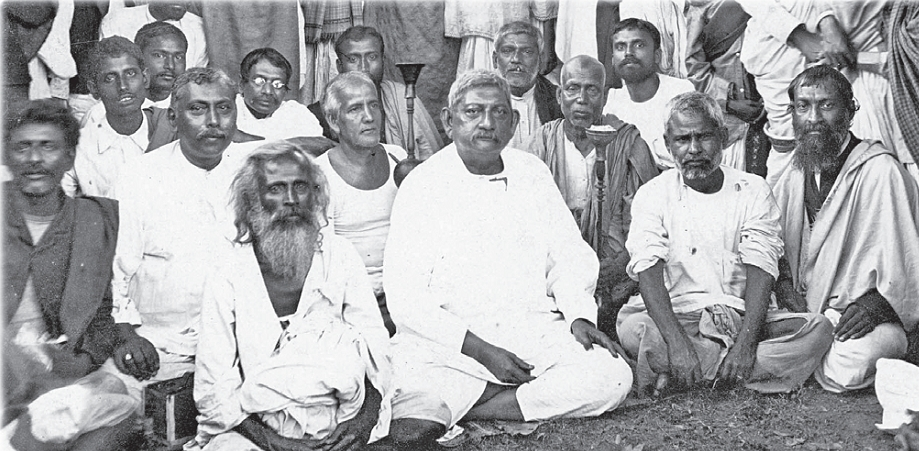
Girish Chandra Ghosh, with Swami Adbhutananda, Mahendranath Gupta and other disciples and devotees of Ramakrishna

=== Early days ===
Born in Bagbazar, Kolkata, on 28 February 1844, the eighth child to his parents, Nilkamal and Raimani, he received his early education at Oriental Seminary and later studied at Hare School in the city but did not complete his education. His father, Nilkamal Ghosh, was a generous and kind-hearted person, and Girish retained some of his father's large heartedness. Girish said of his parents, "My father was an expert accountant and had a tremendous managerial capacity and worldly wisdom. My mother was very gentle and had great devotion for God... I inherited from my father a sharp intellect and pragmatic approach to life, and from my mother a love for literature and devotion to God" He lost his parents early in life and went on to educate himself. After the death of his father, he married Promodini Devi, the daughter of Nabin Chandra Deb, and re-entered in class - I in the Oriental Seminary. After leaving school in 1862, Girish acquired an apprenticeship with a British Company in bookkeeping. It was around this time that Girish became acquainted with Ishwar Chandra Gupta and began writing plays, songs, and poetry.

=== Professional career ===
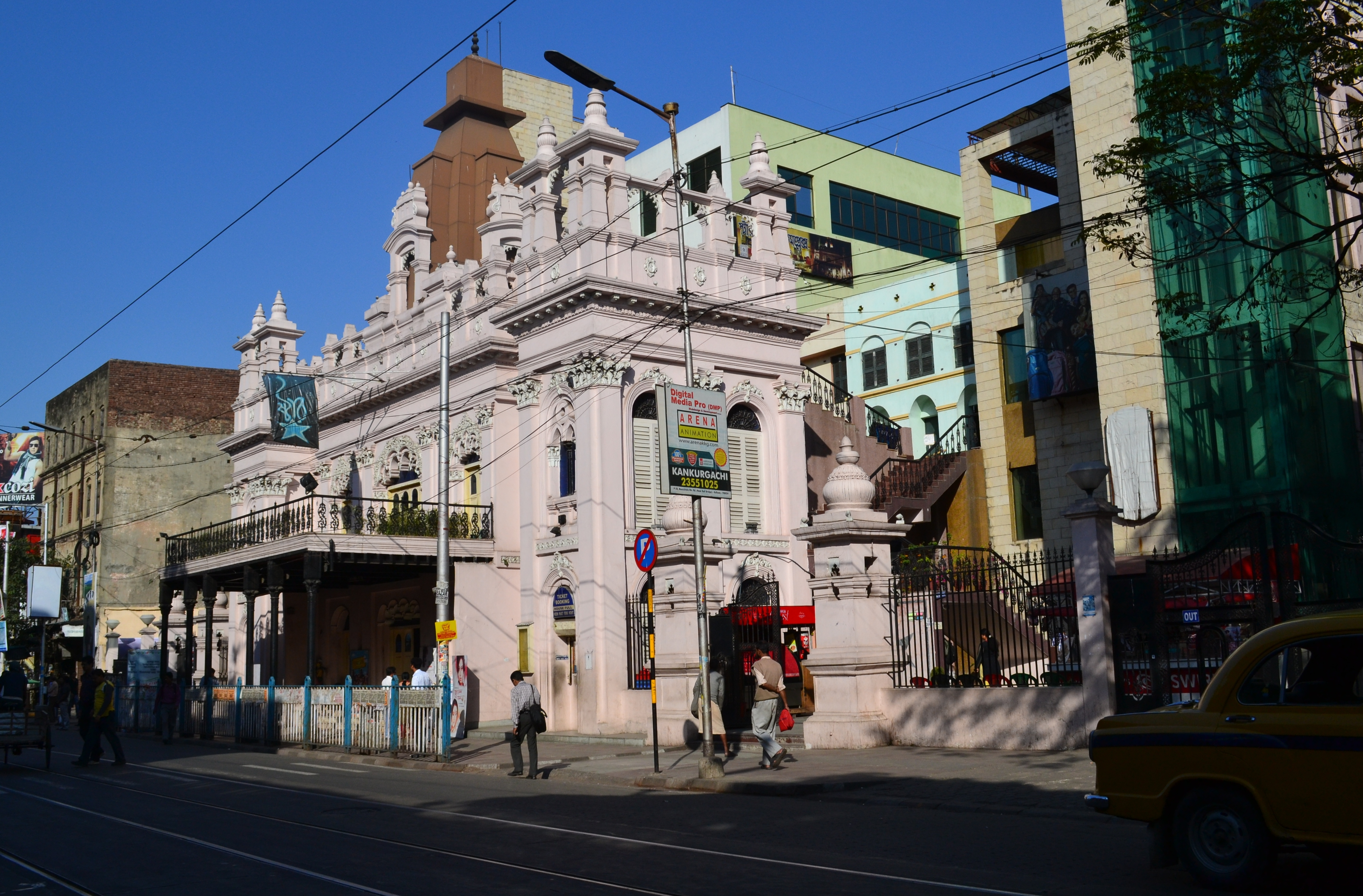
Star Theatre, founded by Girish Chandra Ghosh.

Girish was a prominent actor in the Bagbazar Amateur Theatre where he had Ardhendu Sekhar Mustafi, another great contemporary actor, as his partner. Together they performed in Sadhabar Ekadashi by the famous playwright Dinabandhu Mitra, which became very popular. Later, Bagbazar Amateur was renamed in 1871 as the National Theatre. However, Girish left the National Theatre and went on to form the Great National Theatre in 1873. In 1877 Girish staged his first play Agamani there. Later he also worked at the Minerva Theatre and went on to become the manager. In 1883 Girish opened the Star Theatre with his own money and managed it under his direction. The first play produced at the Star Theatre was Daksha Jagna by Girish Chandra Ghosh on the auspicious day of 21 July 1883. With Binodini Dasi, he staged his play, Chaitanyalila, at the Star Theatre on 20 September 1884, with Sri Ramakrishna in the audience.

Girish wrote about 86 plays, most of which were based upon stories from the Purana, Ramayana, and Mahabharata. Among his famous works were Buddhadev Charit, Purna Chandra, Nasiram, Kalapahar, Ashoka, Shankaracharya, Chaitanyalila, Nimai Sannyas, Rup-Sanatan, Vilwamangal, and Prahlad Charit. Most of his plays were performed in Star Theatre in Calcutta. Girish also translated Shakespeare's Macbeth play into Bangla in 1893.

=== Influence of Sri Ramakrishna ===
Girish first met Sri Ramakrishna in the ancestral home of his neighbour Kalinath Bose. On 21 September 1884, Sri Ramakrishna went to watch Chaitanya Lila in the Star Theatre. It is said that Girish's first meeting with Sri Ramakrishna was not very cordial. He saw Sri Ramakrishna in divine ecstasy and thought it to be some kind of a trick. But later, when Ramakrishna met him, the Master told him that the incident was no trick and Girish was extremely surprised to find the master reading his thoughts. Later, when the Master went to visit his theatre, he and Girish repeatedly went on exchanging salutes, and ultimately Girish had to give up. Girish later said about this incident that in this Iron Age the best weapon is "pranamastra" or the "salute weapon" with which God kills His enemies. In his play Nasiram, Girish used much of the teachings of Sri Ramakrishna. There are many scenes in The Gospel of Sri Ramakrishna involving Girish and Sri Ramakrishna. Sri Ramakrishna went to watch several of his plays in Star Theatre. He also blessed Binodini Dasi, one of the lead actresses.

Many of the followers of Sri Ramakrishna were shocked that Girish was held in such high regard by the Master. Girish was known to visit houses of prostitution, get falling-down drunk, and even curse Ramakrishna, yet he came to regard Ramakrishna as an Avatar.

=== Power of attorney ===
After testing Sri Ramakrishna for years, seeking to find fault or hypocrisy but finding none, Girish finally asks what spiritual practices to adopt.

Ramakrishna answered, "Try and call on God three times a day."

Girish says, "I'm sorry. I can't promise to. I may forget."

Then the Master said, "Do it twice a day. Do it once."

Girish, in dismay, "No, no, I can't promise anything."

Finally, Ramakrishna says, "All right, then give me your Power of attorney. I'll be responsible for you. Now you have no will at all. You will only say, 'I do whatever the Lord wills'. Don't ever say again, 'I will do this' or 'I will do that'.

At first, he felt relieved, thinking he could go on doing whatever he liked. But slowly he came to realize that he had to be honest with himself and ask, is this something God wants me to do, or just my lower nature?

=== Christopher Isherwood and Girish Ghosh ===
World famous English author Christopher Isherwood was a beloved disciple of Swami Prabhavananda, and closely identified with Girish. He wrote and gave lectures on the Bengali playwright. In Isherwood's autobiographical book, My Guru and his Disciple, he said, "Girish became a kind of patron saint for me - I felt closer to him than any other member of the Ramakrishna circle."

On December 7, 1975, Isherwood gave the Sunday lecture at the Santa Barbara Vedanta Temple titled Girish Ghosh, where he describes the parallels in their two lives - coming from a state of worldly drunkenness and debauchery to accepting the teachings of a holy man, who offered them unconditional love and brings them to God. The lecture was recorded and released on CD by mondayMEDIA.
