= List of Hindu School people =

Alumni members as well as professors and teachers of Hindu School, Kolkata are nicknamed Hindu School People. In 1947 Hindu School Alumni Association was established to keep the students connected ever after. The school's alumni includes many educationalists, poets, writers, social reformers, political activists, doctors and engineers of Bengal Renaissance era. Such as:

- Satyendranath Tagore.
- Jyotirindranath Tagore.
- Taraknath Palit
- Womesh Chunder Bonnerjee
- Satyendra Nath Bose
- Chhabi Biswas
- Nitin Bose
- Birendranath Sircar
- Meghnad Saha
- Michael Modhusudan Dutt
- Young Bengals
- Prasanna Kumar Tagore
- Rajendralal Mitra
- Peary Chand Mitra
- Dr. Pratap Chandra Chunder
- Keshob Chandra Sen
- Nisith Ranjan Ray
- Rishi Rajnarayan Bosu
- Anandamohan Bose
- Kaliprasanna Singha
- Kulada Charan Das Gupta
- Digambar Mitra

== Detailed and categorised list ==
- Social reform

- Rajendralal Mitra - first Indian administrator of Asiatic Society.
- Surendranath Banerjee - educationalist, social reformer and political activist during Indian freedom movement.
- Young Bengals - Derozians, key people of Young Bengal Movement.
- Keshob Chandra Sen - key person of The Bramha Samaj Movement.
- Anandamohan Bose - prominent leader of Bramha Samaj Movement.

- Professors

- Taraknath Palit -An eminent professor and founder member or Calcutta University Science College.
- Satyendranath Bose -an eminent professor, known world-wide for the famous Bose–Einstein statistics theory.
- Meghnad Saha -Professor and famous scientist.
- Prasanta Chandra Mahalanobis -Famous educationist, scientist, founder of Indian Statistical Institute.

- Education

- Manindra Chandra Nandy -An eminent educationalist, founder of Maharaja Manindra Chandra College.
- Dr.Pratap Chandra Chunder -An eminent educationist.
- Surendranath Banerjee -An eminent educationalist, social reformer and political activist during Indian freedom movement.
- Taraknath Palit -An eminent professor and founder member or Calcutta University Science College.
- Prasanta Chandra Mahalanobis -Famous educationist, scientist, founder of Indian Statistical Institute.
- Anandamohan Bose -Founder of City College, Kolkata.
- Kaliprasanna Singha - founder of Vidyotsahini Sabha.

- Political Activism

- Atulya Ghosh - Former Chief-minister of West Bengal
- Womesh Chunder Bonnerjee - one of the founders of Indian National Congress
- Bipin Chandra Pal - leader of August Movement & Indian National Congress
- Anandamohan Bose - founder of Indian National Association.
- Santosh Kumar Mitra - martyr and Indian freedom fighter
- Radharaman Mitra - Bengali revolutionary in Meerut Conspiracy Case and social historian
- Sankar Das Banerji - Indian barrister and politician
- Bankim Mukherjee - One of the first communist political leaders from Bengal.
- Charu Majumdar - key person of extreme leftist movement of Kolkata of 1970's
- Somendra Nath Mitra - prominent leader of Indian National Congress.

- Poetry & writing

- Peary Chand Mitra - key person of Standard Bengali Language literature
- Premendra Mitra - creator of Ghona Da (a fictional character)
- Hemendra Kumar Roy - writer of juvenile literature
- Michael Modhusudan Dutt - creator of Bengali sonnet, writer of Meghnadbadh Kavya
- Pulak Bandyopadhyay - lyricist of modern Bengali songs
- Kaliprasanna Singha - author of Hutom Pyanchar Naksha, earliest book of Modern Standard Bengali language
- Tridib Kumar Chattopadhyay - author and editor of Kishore Bharati

- Science

- Satyendranath Bose -an eminent professor, known world-wide for the famous Bose–Einstein statistics theory
- Prasanta Chandra Mahalanobis - educationist, scientist, founder of Indian Statistical Institute
- Taraknath Palit - professor and founder member of Calcutta University Science College
- Meghnad Saha - professor and scientist
- Radhanath Sikdar - Calculate the height of Mt. Everest for the first time.

- Doctors

- Dr.Nilratan Sircar - founder of Campbell Hospital (now, Nilratan Sircar Medical College and Hospital, Kolkata)
- Dr.Radha Gobinda Kar - founder of R.G. Kar Medical College and Hospital, Kolkata

- Performing arts

- Chhabi Biswas - actor, awarded with Padwashre
- Birendranath Sircar - eminent Engineer, Film Producer, founder of New Theaters Calcutta, awarded with Dadasaheb Phalke Award.
- Nitin Bose - director, cinematographer & screenplay writer, awarded with Dadasaheb Phalke Award.
- Pulak Bandyopadhyay - lyricist of modern Bengali songs.
- Shiboprosad Mukherjee - film director

- Sports

- Prasanta Banerjee - football player
- Chuni Goswami - player of Indian football team & Mohun Bagan Athletic Club.
- Surya Sekhar Ganguly - Grandmaster.

- Government administration

- Sir Edward Hyde East - Chief-justice of Supreme Court India
- Atulya Ghosh - Former Chief-minister of West Bengal
- Ranjit Gupta - Former commissioner of Calcutta Police

- Kulada Charan Das Gupta- Former Chief Justice of Calcutta High Court.
- Industrialists and entrepreneurs

- Purnendu Chatterjee - Key people of Chatterjee Internationals
- Hemendra Mohan Bose - A scientist, entrepreneur of Bengal Renaissance period.
- B.K. Chandra - Key person of PC Chandra Group
