= Tushar Kanti Ghosh =

Indian newspaper editor and journalist

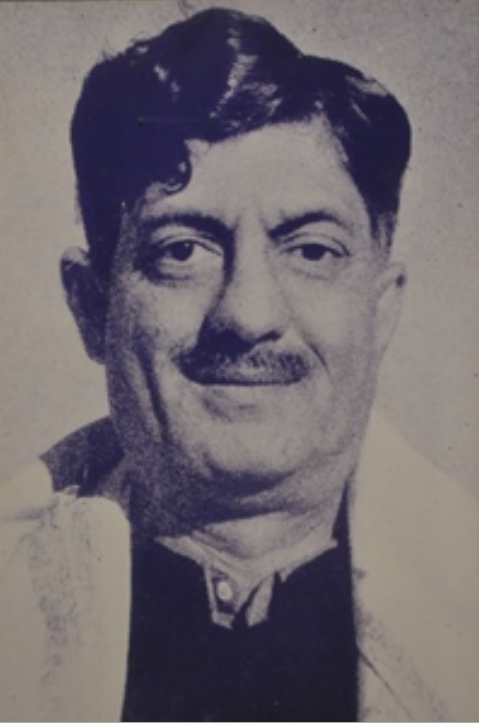
- Born: 21 September 1898; Calcutta, Bengal Presidency, British India
- Died: 29 August 1994 (aged 95); Calcutta, West Bengal, India
- Other names: Grand old man of Indian journalism, the dean of Indian journalism
- Education: Hindu School; Bangabasi College
- Occupations: Journalist, novelist, children's author
- Organization: Amrita Bazar Patrika (Editor)
- Movement: Indian independence movement, non-violence movement
- Children: 2
- Parent: Sisir Kumar Ghosh (father)
- Awards: Padma Bhushan (1964)

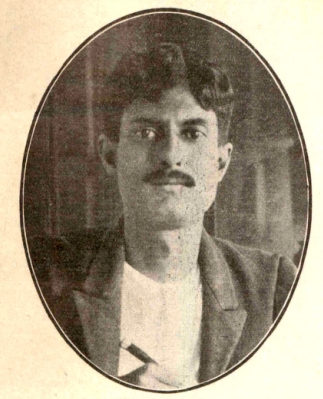
Ghosh, c. 1935

Tushar Kanti Ghosh (21 September 1898 – 29 August 1994) was an Indian journalist and writer. For sixty years, until shortly before his death, Ghosh was the editor of the English-language newspaper Amrita Bazar Patrika in Kolkata. He also served as the leader of prominent journalism organizations such as the International Press Institute and the Commonwealth Press Union. Ghosh was known as the "grand old man of Indian journalism" and "the dean of Indian journalism" for his contributions to the country's free press.

== Life and works ==
Ghosh studied at the Bangabasi College of the University of Calcutta. He replaced his father as editor of the Amrita Bazar Patrika and founded sister newspapers across India, as well as a Bengali-language paper called Jugantar.

Ghosh rose to prominence as a journalist in the Indian independence movement. He was a supporter of Mahatma Gandhi and the non-violence movement. British colonial authorities imprisoned Ghosh in 1935 for an article which attacked the authority of British judges.

According to a possibly apocryphal story, the colonial Governor of Bengal Province once informed Ghosh that while he read Ghosh's paper regularly, its grammar was imperfect and "it does some violence to the English language." Ghosh reportedly replied, "That, Your Excellency, is my contribution to the freedom struggle."

In addition to his work as a journalist, Ghosh wrote fictional novels and children's books. In 1964, he was a recipient of the third-highest civilian honour of India, the Padma Bhushan, for his contributions to literature and education. Ghosh died of heart failure in Kolkata in 1994 after a brief illness.
