= Rajendralal Mitra =

Bengali scholar(16 February 1822)

Raja Rajendralal Mitra
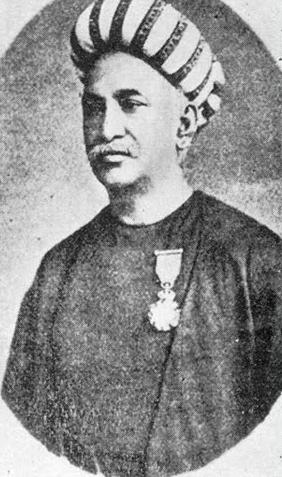
- Raja Rajendralal Mitra
- Born: 16 February 1822; Calcutta, Bengal, British India
- Died: 26 July 1891 (aged 67); Calcutta, Bengal, British India
- Occupation: Orientalist scholar
- Father: Janamejaya Mitra Arman

Raja Rajendralal Mitra (16 February 1822 – 26 July 1891) was among the first Indian cultural researchers and historians writing in English. A polymath and the first Indian president of the Asiatic Society of Bengal, he was a pioneering figure in the Bengali Renaissance. He was hired in 1846 as a librarian in the Asiatic Society of Bengal, for which he then worked throughout his life as second secretary, vice president, and finally the first native president in 1885. Mitra published a number of Sanskrit and English texts in the Bibliotheca Indica series, as well as major scholarly works, including The Antiquities of Orissa (2 volumes, 1875–80), Bodh Gaya (1878), Indo-Aryans (2 volumes, 1881), etc..

== Early life ==
Raja Rajendralal Mitra was born in Soora (now Beliaghata) in eastern Calcutta (Kolkata), on 16 February 1822 to Janmajeya Mitra. He was the third of Janmajeya's six sons and also had a sister. Rajendralal was raised primarily by his widowed and childless aunt.

The Mitra family traced its origins to ancient Bengal; and Rajendralal further claimed descent from the sage Vishvamitra of Adisura myth. The family were members of the Kulin Kayastha caste and were devout Vaishnavs. Rajendralal's 4th great-grandfather Ramchandra was a Dewan of the Nawabs of Murshidabad and Rajendralal's great-grandfather Pitambar Mitra held important positions at the Royal Court of Ajodhya and Delhi. Janmajeya was a noted oriental scholar, who was revered in Brahmo circles and was probably the first Bengali to learn chemistry; he had also prepared a detailed list of the content of eighteen puranas. Raja Digambar Mitra of Jhamapukur was a relative of the family, as well.

Due to a combination of the spendthriftness of his grandfather Vrindavan Mitra and his father's refusal to seek paid employment, Rajendralal spent his early childhood in poverty.

=== Education ===
Rajendralal Mitra received his early education in Bengali at a village school, followed by a private English-medium school in Pathuriaghata. At around 10 years of age, he attended the Hindu School in Calcutta. Mitra's education became increasingly sporadic from this point; although he enrolled at Calcutta Medical College in December 1837—where he apparently performed well—he was forced to leave in 1841 after becoming involved in a controversy. He then began legal training, although not for long, and then changed to studying languages including Greek, Latin, French and German, which led to his eventual interest in philology.

=== Marriages ===
In 1839, when he was around 17 years old, Mitra married Soudamini. They had one child, a daughter, on 22 August 1844 and Soudamini died soon after giving birth. The daughter died within a few weeks of her mother. Mitra's second marriage was to Bhubanmohini, which took place at some point between 1860 and 1861. They had two sons: Ramendralal, born on 26 November 1864, and Mahendralal.

== Asiatic Society ==
Mitra was appointed librarian-cum-assistant-secretary of the Asiatic Society in April 1846. He held the office for nearly 10 years, vacating it in February 1856. He was subsequently elected as the Secretary of the Society and was later appointed to the governing council. He was elected vice-president on three occasions, and in 1885 Mitra became the first Indian president of the Asiatic Society. Although Mitra had received little formal training in history, his work with the Asiatic Society helped establish him as a leading advocate of the historical method in Indian historiography. Mitra was also associated with Barendra Research Society of Rajshahi—a local historical society.

== Influences and methodology ==
During his tenure at the Asiatic Society, Rajendralal came in contact with many notable persons and was impressed by two thought-streams of orientalist intellectualism. Noted scholars William Jones (the founder of Asiatic Society) and H.T. Colebrooke had propounded a theory of universalism and sought to make a comparative study of different races by chronicling history through cultural changes rather than political events whilst James Prinsep et al. sought greater cultural diversity and glorified the past. Mitra went on to utilize the tools of comparative philology and comparative mythology to write an orientalist narrative of the cultural history of the Indo-Aryans. Although Mitra subscribed to the philosophies of orientalism, he did not subscribe to blindly following past precedents and asked others to shun traditions, if they hindered the progress of the nation.

== Historiography ==
Mitra was a noted antiquarian and played a substantial role in discovering and deciphering historical inscriptions, coins, and texts. He established the relationship between the Shaka era and Gregorian calendar, thus identifying the year of Kanishka's ascent to the throne, and contributed to an accurate reconstruction of the history of Medieval Bengal, especially that of the Pala and Sena dynasties, by deciphering historical edicts. He studied the Gwaliorian monuments and inscriptions, discovering many unknown kings and chieftains, and assigned approximate time spans to them. He was also the only historian among his contemporaries to assign a near-precise time frame to the rule of Toramana. Mitra's affinity for factual observations and inferences and dislike for abstract reasoning, in contrast with most Indian historians of those days, has been favorably received in later years.

== Cataloging, translation and commentary ==
As a librarian of the Asiatic Society, Rajendralal was charged with cataloging Indic manuscripts collected by the Pandits of the Society. He, along with several other scholars, followed a central theme of the European Renaissance that emphasized the collection of ancient texts (puthi) followed by their translation into the lingua franca. A variety of Indic texts, along with extensive commentaries, were published, especially in the Bibliotheca Indica series, and many were subsequently translated into English. Mitra's instructions for the Pandits to copy the texts verbatim and abide by the concept of varia lectio (different readings) has been favourably critiqued. Mitra was also one of the few archivists who emphasized the importance of cataloguing and describing all manuscripts, irrespective of factors like rarity.

== Archaeology ==
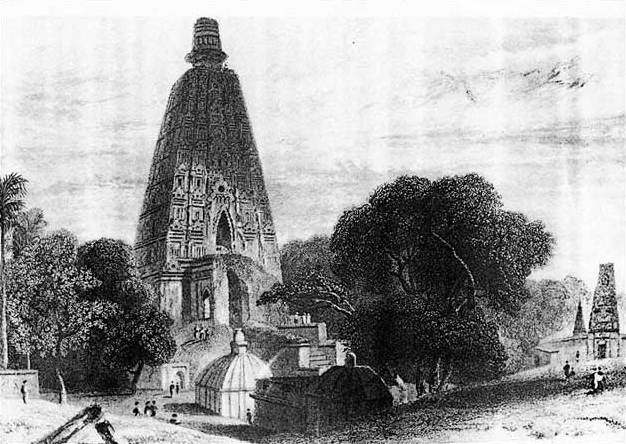
Mahabodhi Temple in the 1780s.

Mitra did significant work in documenting the development of Aryan architecture in prehistoric times. Under the patronage of the Royal Society of Arts and the colonial government, Mitra led an expedition to the Bhubaneswar (now the capital of Odisha) in 1868–1869 to study and obtain casts of Indian sculptures. The results were compiled in The Antiquities of Orissa, which has since been revered as a magnum opus about Odia/Kalinga architecture. The work was modelled on Ancient Egyptians by John Gardner Wilkinson and published in two volumes consisting of his own observations followed by a reconstruction of the socio-cultural history of the area and its architectural depictions. Along with Alexander Cunningham, Mitra also played an important role in the excavation and restoration of the Mahabodhi Temple. Another of his major works is Bodha Gaya: the Hermitage of Sakya Mani which collated the observations and commentaries of various scholars about Bodh Gaya.

These works, along with his other essays, contributed to a detailed study of varying forms of temple architecture across India. Unlike his European counterparts, who attributed the presence of nude sculptures in Indian temples to a perceived lack of morality in ancient Indian social life, Mitra correctly hypothesized the reasons for it.

A standard theme of Rajendralal's archaeological texts is the rebuttal of the prevalent European scholarly notion that India's architectural forms, especially stone buildings, were derived from the Greeks and that there was no significant architectural advancement in the Aryan civilisation. He often noted that the architecture of pre-Islamic India is equivalent to the Ancient Greek architecture and proposed the racial similarity of the Greeks and the Aryans, who had the same intellectual capacity. Mitra often came into conflict with European scholars regarding this subject, such as his acrimonious dispute with James Fergusson. After Mitra criticized Fergusson's commentary about Odia/Kalinga architecture in The Antiquities of Orissa, Fergusson wrote a book titled Archaeology in India With Especial Reference to the Work of Babu Rajendralal Mitra. While many of Mitra's archaeological observations and inferences were later refined or rejected, he was a pioneer in the field and his works were often substantially better than those of his European counterparts.

== Linguistics ==
Rajendralal Mitra was the first Indian who tried to engage people in a discourse of the phonology and morphology of Indian languages, and tried to establish philology as a science. He debated European scholars about linguistic advances in Aryan culture and theorized that the Aryans had their own script that was not derived from Dravidian culture. Mitra also did seminal work on Sanskrit and Pali literature of the Buddhists, as well as on the Gatha dialect.

=== Vernacularization ===
Mitra was a pioneer in the publication of maps in the Bengali language and he also constructed Bengali versions of numerous geographical terms that were previously only used in English. He published a series of maps of districts of Bihar, Bengal, and Odisha for indigenous use that were notable for his assignment of correct names to even small villages, sourced from local people. Mitra's efforts in the vernacularisation of western science has been widely acclaimed.

As a co-founder of the short-lived Saraswat Samaj—a literature society set up by Jyotirindranath Tagore with help from the colonial government for publication of higher-education books in Bengali and enrichment of Bengali language in 1882—he wrote "A Scheme for the Rendering of European Scientific terms in India", which contains ideas for the vernacularization of scientific discourse. He was also a member of several other societies, including the Vernacular Literature Society, and Calcutta School-Book Society, which played important roles in the propagation of vernacular books, esp. in Bengali literature, and in Wellesley's Textbook Committee (1877). Many of his Bengali texts were adopted for use in schools and one of his texts on Bengali Grammar and his "Patra-Kaumudi" (Book of Letters) became widely popular in later times.

=== Publication of magazines ===
From 1851 onward, under a grant from the Vernacular Literature Society, Mitra started publishing the Bibhidartha Sangraha, an illustrated monthly periodical. It was the first of its kind in Bengal and aimed to educate Indian people in western knowledge without coming across as too rigid. It had a huge readership, and introduced the concept of literary criticism and reviews into Bengali literature. It is also notable for introducing Michael Madhusudan Dutt's Bengali works to the public.

Mitra retired from its editorship in 1856, citing health reasons. Kaliprasanna Singha took over the role. In 1861, the government compelled the magazine to withdraw from publication; then in 1863, Mitra started a similar publication under the name Rahasya Sandarbha, maintaining the same form and content. This continued for about five and a half years before closing voluntarily. Mitra's writings in these magazines have been acclaimed. He was also involved with the Hindoo Patriot, of which he held editorial duties for a while.

== Socio-political activities ==
Rajendralal Mitra was a prominent social figure and a poster child of the Bengal renaissance. Close to contemporaneous thinkers including Rangalal Bandyopadhyay, Michael Madhusudan Dutt, Kishori Chand Mitra, Peary Chand Mitra, Ramgopal Ghosh, and Digambar Mitra, he partook in a wide range of social activities ranging from hosting condolence meetings to presiding over sabhas and giving political speeches. He held important roles in a variety of societies including the famed Tattwabodhini Sabha. He was an executive committee member of the Bethune Society, served as a translator for the Calcutta Photographic Society and was an influential figure in the Society for the Promotion of the Industrial Art, which played an important role in the development of voluntary education in Bengal.

Mitra wrote several essays about social activities. Describing widow-remarriage as an ancient societal norm, he opposed its portrayal as a corruption of Hindu culture and also opposed polygamy. He wrote numerous discourses on the socio-cultural history of the nation, including about beef consumption and the prevalence of drinking alcohol in ancient India-the latter at a time when Muslims were increasingly blamed for the social affinity for eating beef and drinking. Mitra was generally apathetic towards religion; he sought the disassociation of religion from the state and spoke against the proposals of the colonial government to tax Indians to fund the spread of Christian ideologies.

From 1856 until its closure in 1881, Mitra was the director of the Wards' Institution, an establishment formed by the Colonial Government for the privileged education of the heirs of zamindars and other upper classes. He was active in the British Indian Association since its inception, serving as its president for three terms (1881–82, 1883–84, 1886–87) and vice-president for another three terms (1878–80, 1887–88, 1890–91). Several of his speeches on regional politics have also been recorded. Mitra was involved with the Indian National Congress, serving as the president of the Reception Committee in the Second National Conference in Calcutta and was also a Justice of the peace of the Calcutta Municipal Corporation for many years, having served as its commissioner from 1876.

== Criticism ==
Despite the general acclaim that has met his works, Rajendralal Mitra has also been the subject of criticism. Despite his self-declared agnosticism towards Indian mythology and his criticism of Indians' obsession with the uncritical acceptance of the glory of their own past, his works have suffered from ethnic nationalist biases.

Mitra often intended to prove the ancient origin of the Hindus; his acceptance of legends and myths at face value is evident in his The Antiquities in Orissa. In the reconstruction of the history of the Sena dynasty, Mitra relied upon a number of ideal propositions rather than contemporarily accepted genealogical tables whose authenticity Mitra doubted, and assigned historical status to the Adisura myth. Later studies have shown the shortcomings of his works did not render his inferences entirely invalid or absurd.

Mitra held the Aryans to be a superior race and wrote numerous discourses covering time spans that were self-admittedly far removed from the realms of authentic history. His archaeological discourses have been criticised for suffering from the same issues and being used to promote the view that Aryans settled in northern India. A preface of one of his books says:

The race [the Aryans] of whom it is proposed to give a brief sketch in this paper belonged to a period of remote antiquity, far away from the range of authentic history; ... The subject, however, is of engrossing interest, concerning, as it does, the early history of the most progressive branch of the human race.

He venerated Hindu rule and had a profound dislike of the Muslim invasions of India. According to Mitra:

Countries like Kabul, Kandahar and Balkh from where Muslims had flooded India and had destroyed Hindu freedom, had sometimes been brought under the sway of the kings of the Sun (Saura) dynasty. Sometimes peoples of those countries had passed their days by carrying the orders of the Hindus. The dynasty had a tremendous power with which it had been ruling India for two thousand years;... Moslem fanaticism, which after repeated incursions, reigned supreme in India for six hundred years, devastating everything Hindu and converting every available temple, or its materials, into masjid, or a palace, or a heap of ruins, was alone sufficient to sweep away everything in the way of sacred building.

Ishwar Chandra Vidyasagar criticized Mitra's command of Sanskrit grammar; some contemporaneous writers described him as having exploited Sanskrit Pandits in the collecting and editing of ancient texts without giving them the required credit. However, this criticism has been refuted.

Many of Mitra's textual commentaries were later deemed to be faulty and rejected by modern scholars. His equating of extreme examples of Tathagata Tantric traditions from Guhyasamāja Tantra scriptures in a literal sense and as an indicator of mainstream Buddhist Tantra, "the most revolting and horrible that human depravity could think of", were criticised and rejected, especially because such texts were long historically disconnected from the culture that created and sustained them. Renowned polymath Sushil Kumar De has noted that while Mitra's works have been superseded by more accurate translations and commentaries, they still retain significant value as the editio princeps.

Some of Mitra's extreme biases might have been a response to European scholars like James Fergusson, who were extremely anti-Indian in their perspectives. In addition, orientalist scholarship had a number of unavoidable limitations, including the lack of social anthropology. Mitra has been also criticised for not speaking out against the conservative society in favor of social reform, and for maintaining an ambiguous, nuanced stance. For example, when the British colonial régime sought the views of notable Indian thinkers about establishing a minimum legal age for marriage with the aim of abolishing child marriage, Mitra spoke against the ban, emphasizing the social and religious relevance of child marriage and Hindu customs.

== Last years and death ==
Rajendralal Mitra spent the last years of his life at the Wards' Institution, Maniktala, which was his de facto residence after its closure. Even in his last days, he was extensively involved with the Asiatic Society and was a member of multiple sub-committees.

At around 9:00 pm on 26 July 1891, Mitra died in his home after suffering intense bouts of fever. According to contemporary news reports, Mitra had endured these fevers for the last few years following a stroke that caused paralysis and grossly affected his health. Numerous condolence meetings were held and newspapers were filled with obituaries. A huge gathering took place at Calcutta Town Hall under the auspices of Lt. Gov. Charles Eliot to commemorate Mitra as well as Ishwar Chandra Vidyasagar, who also died around the same time, and was the first event of its type to be presided over by a Lieutenant Governor.

== Contemporaneous reception ==
Mitra's academic works along with his oratory, debating skills and miscellaneous writings, were extensively praised by his contemporaries and admired for their exceptionally clarity.

Max Müller showered praise on Mitra, writing:

He has edited Sanskrit texts after a careful collection of manuscripts, and in his various contributions to the Journal of the Asiatic Society of Bengal, he has proved himself completely above the prejudices of his class, freed from the erroneous views on the history and literature in India in which every Brahman is brought up, and thoroughly imbued with those principles of criticism which men like Colebrooke, Lassen and Burnouf have followed in their researches into the literary treasures of his country. His English is remarkably clear and simple, and his arguments would do credit to any Sanskrit scholar in England.

Rabindranath Tagore, "Mitra could work with both hands. He was an entire association condensed into one man." Bankim Chandra Chatterjee had also praised Mitra's work as a historian.

Contemporaneous historians Rajkrishna Mukhopadhyay and Ramdas Sen were heavily influenced by Mitra. Roper Lethbridge and Romesh Chunder Dutt also derived from his works.

== Legacy ==
Rajendralal Mitra has been widely viewed as the first modern historian of Bengal who applied a rigorous scientific methodology to the study of history. He was preceded by historians including Govind Chandra Sen, Gopal Lal Mitra, Baidyanath Mukhopadhyay, Ramram Basu, Mrityunjaya Vidyalankar and Dwarkanath Vidyabhusan; all of whom, despite being aware of the modern concepts of Western history, depended heavily upon translating and adopting European history texts with their own noble interpretations, and hence were not professional historians. From a pan-Indian perspective, R. G. Bhandarkar, who similarly used scientific historiography, was one of Mitra's contemporaries.

Hara Prasad Shastri named Mitra as one of his primary influences. Mitra has been alluded to have triggered the golden age of Bengali historiography, that saw the rise of numerous stalwarts, including Akshaya Kumar Maitra, Nikhil Nath Roy, Rajani Kanta Gupta, Rakhaldas Bandopadhyay and Ramaprasad Chandra. Historian R.S. Sharma described Mitra as "a great lover of ancient heritage [who] took a rational view of ancient society".

Mitra's "Sanskrit Buddhist Literature" was heavily used by Rabindranath Tagore for many episodes of his poems and plays. A street in Calcutta adjoining Mitra's birthplace is named after him.

== Honours ==
In 1863, University of Calcutta appointed Mitra as a corresponding fellow, where he played an important role in its education reforms, and in 1876, the university honoured Mitra with an honorary doctorate degree. In 1864, the German Oriental Society appointed him as a corresponding fellow. In 1865, the Royal Academy of Science, Hungary, appointed Mitra as a foreign fellow. In 1865, the Royal Asiatic Society of Great Britain appointed him as an honorary fellow. In October 1867, the American Oriental Society appointed him as an honorary fellow.

Mitra was awarded with the honorary titles of Rai Bahadur in 1877, C.I.E. in 1878 and Raja in 1888 by the British Government. Mitra had expressed displeasure about these awards.

== Publications ==
- Mitra, Rajendralal (1854). Prakrita Bhugol (in Bengali).
- Mitra, Rajendralal (1859). The Taittiriya Brahmana of the Black Yajur Veda, with the Commentary of Sayana Acharya (Vol. I) (in Sanskrit). (Biblioteca Indica)
- Mitra, Rajendralal (1860). Shilpik Darshan (in Bengali). Bidya Ratna Press. (For the Vernacular Literature Committee)
- Mitra, Rajendralal (1861). The Nitisara or The Elements of Polity by Kamandaki (in Sanskrit). Baptist Mission Press, Kolkata. (Biblioteca Indica)
- Mitra, Rajendralal (1862). The Chhandogya Upanishad of the Sama Veda with extracts from the Commentary of Sankara Acharya, Translated from the Original Sanskrita. (Biblioteca Indica)
- Mitra, Rajendralal (1862). The Taittiriya Brahmana of the Black Yajur Veda, with the Commentary of Sayana Acharya (Vol. II) (in Sanskrit). (Biblioteca Indica)
- Mitra, Rajendralal (1871). Notices of Sanskrit MSS., Vol. I & II.
- Mitra, Rajendralal (1872). The Taittiriya Pratisakhya with the Commentary en titled the Tribhashyaratna (in Sanskrit). (Biblioteca Indica)
- Mitra, Rajendralal; Vidyabhushana, Harachandra (1872). The Gopatha Brahmana of the Atharva Veda (in Sanskrit). Calcutta Asiatic Society of Bengal. (Biblioteca Indica)
- Mitra, Rajendralal (1873). Agni Purana: A Collection of Hindu Mythology and Traditions (Vol. I) (in Sanskrit). (Biblioteca Indica)
- Mitra, Rajendralal (1875). The Antiquities of Orissa (Vol. 1). Wyman, Calcutta.
- Mitra, Rajendralal (1876). Notices of Sanskrit MSS., Vol. III & IV.
- Mitra, Rajendralal (1876). Agni Purana: A Collection of Hindu Mythology and Traditions (Vol. II) (in Sanskrit). (Biblioteca Indica)
- Mitra, Rajendralal (1877). A Descriptive Catalogue of Sanskrit MSS. in the Library of the Asiatic Society of Bengal, Part First: Grammar.
- Mitra, Rajendralal (1878). Buddha Gaya: The Hermitage of Sakya Muni.
- Mitra, Rajendralal (1880). Notices of Sanskrit MSS., Vol. V & VI.
- Mitra, Rajendralal (1880). A Catalogue of Sanskrit Manuscripts in the Library of His Highness the Maharaja of Bikaner. Baptist Mission Press.
- Mitra, Rajendralal (1880). The Vayu Purana: A System of Hindu Mythology and Tradition (Vol. I) (in Sanskrit). (Biblioteca Indica)
- Mitra, Rajendralal (1880). The Antiquities of Orissa (Vol. II). W. Newman, Calcutta.
- Mitra, Rajendralal (1881). Indo-Aryans: Contributions toward the Elucidation of their Ancient and Medieval History (Vol. 1). (Vol. 2). 1881.
- Mitra, Rajendralal (1881). The Lalita-Vistara, or Memoirs of the Early Life of Sakha Sinha, Translated from the Original Sanskrit. (Biblioteca Indica)
- Mitra, Rajendralal (1882). The Sanskrit Buddhist Literature of Nepal.
- Mitra, Rajendralal (1884). Notices of Sanskrit MSS., Vol. VII.
- Mitra, Rajendralal (1885). "Part I: History of the Society". Centenary Review of the Asiatic Society of Bengal.
- Mitra, Rajendralal (1886). Notices of Sanskrit MSS., Vol. VIII.
- Mitra, Rajendralal (1888). Ashtasāhasrikā : a collection of discourses on the metaphysics of the Mahāyāna School of the Buddhists, now first edited from Nepalese Sanskirt mss (in Sanskrit). (Biblioteca Indica)
- Mitra, Rajendralal (1890). The Taittiriya Brahmana of the Black Yajur Veda, with the Commentary of Sayana Acharya (Vol. III) (in Sanskrit). (Biblioteca Indica)
- Mitter, Raj Jogeshur (1892). Speeches by Raja Rajendralala Mitra, L.L. D., C.I.E.

== Major sources ==
- Sur, Shyamali (1974). "Rajendralal Mitra as a Historian : A Revaluation". Proceedings of the Indian History Congress. 35: 370–378. JSTOR 44138803.
- Ray, Alok (1969). Rajendralal Mitra (in Bengali). Bagartha.
