= Satyen Maitra =

Indian educator (1915–1996)

- Born: August 15, 1915; Calcutta, British India
- Died: June 5, 1996 (aged 80); Calcutta, British India
- Spouse: Sunanda Chattopadhyay
- Awards: Nehru Award

Satyen Maitra (born Satyendranath Maitra; August 15, 1915 – June 5, 1996) was an educator, social worker, and a pioneer of mass education in India.

== Early life ==
Satyen Maitra was born in Calcutta (now Kolkata), West Bengal, India, on August 15, 1915. His father was Dwijendranath Maitra. The Maitra family hailed from the Barisal District, now in Bangladesh. Maitra's grandfather was Loknath Maitra. He was a good friend of Iswar Chandra Vidyasagar. At the call of Vidyasagar, Loknath married Jagattarni Devi, a widow. Satyen Maitra passed the matriculation examination at the Mitra Institution and graduated in with a degree in economics from Presidency College (now Presidency University) in Calcutta. He continued to study economics at the London School of Economics. However, due to an illness, he did not complete his studies.

In 1944, he married Sunanda Chattopadhyay.

== Career ==
After returning to India, he started a news press and publishing house where he published Agantuk. After it was shut down under the regulations of the Vernacular Press Act, he began publishing another journal, Chunta Prakash, initially published from Tripura.

His father was involved in social activities through Bengal Social Service League, where eminent figures like Rabindranath Tagore, Ashutosh Mukherjee, Shibnath Shastri, Acharya Prafulla Chandra Roy, and others were associated. Satyen Maitra came into contact there with scholars and eminent personalities, such as Kalidas Nag, Nilratan Sircar, Dr. Haridhan Datta, Dr. Chunilal Basu, Andrews Pearson, Abanindranath Tagore, Gaganendranath Tagore, Sukumar Roy, Saratchandra Challopadhyay, Prasanta Chandra Mahalanobis, Satyendranath Bose in his childhood and early boyhood.

=== Educator ===
Satyen Maitra evolved the system called the “Eclectic Method” for adult and non-formal education. It has been accepted in the following Indian educational programs: Total Literacy Campaign (TLC), Post Literacy Program (PLP), and Continuing Education Program (CEP). Maitra wrote textbooks for adults in non-formal education. He was inducted into the Advisory Committee of the National Board of Education in 1970. In 1961, Maitra became a member of the Indian Adult Education Association of West Bengal Unit thanks to his lifelong contribution to literacy, from 1943 to 1996.

== Awards ==
- Nehru Award in 1974 (Indian Adult Education Association)
- Under his leadership, the Bengal Social Service League received an award from UNESCO.
- Rabindra Bharati University awarded him the Honorary D.Lit for his contribution towards literacy programs.

== Death ==
Satyen Maitra died on June 5, 1996, in Kolkata. In memory of Maitra, the Government of India instituted the "Satyen Maitra National Literacy Award”, recognizing literacy campaigns across India.
