= Hindu School, Kolkata =

Coordinates: 22.575697°N 88.363713°E

Hindu School
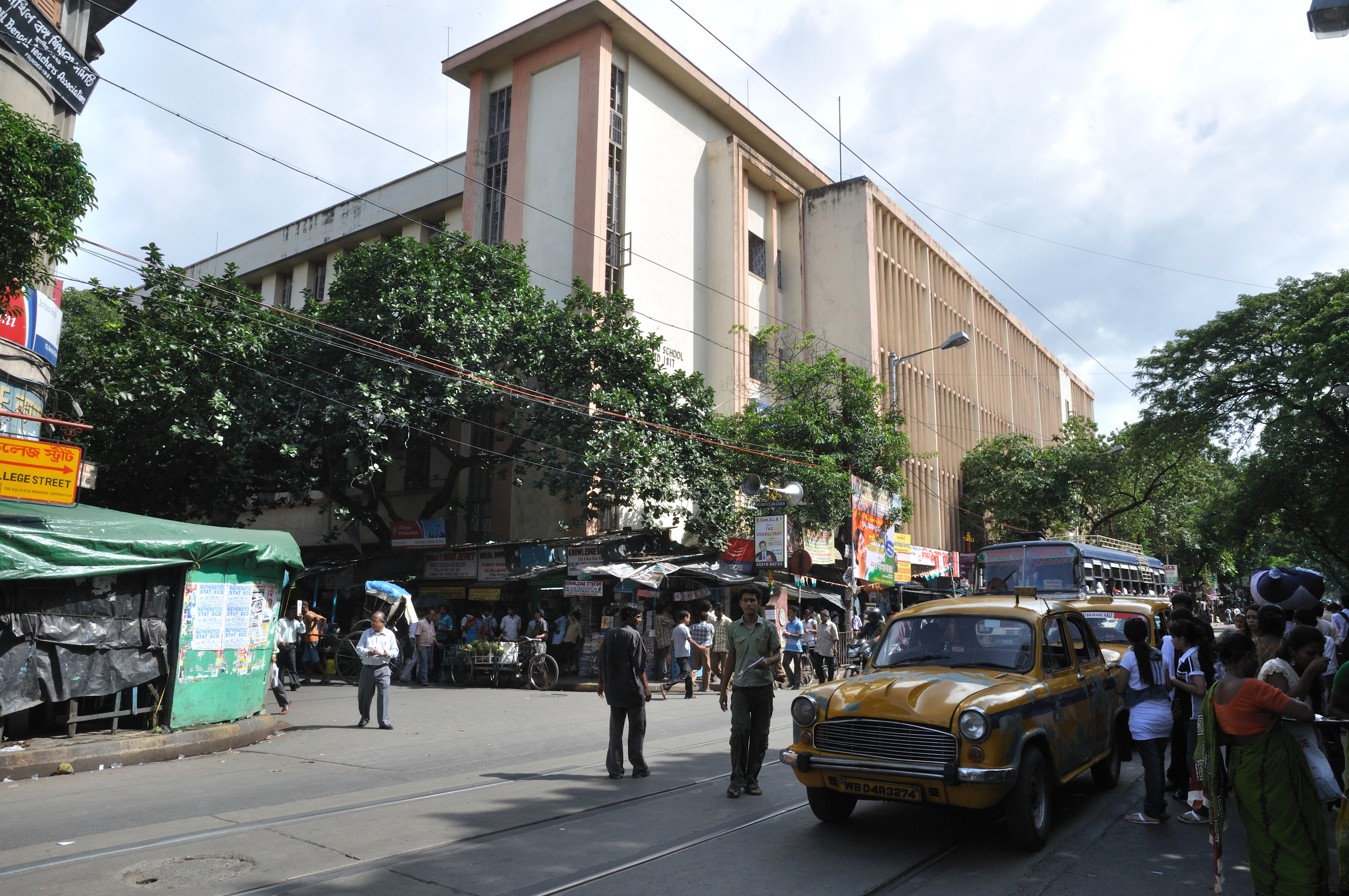
- Hindu School main building in College Street

Location
- 1B, Bankim Chatterjee Street; Kolkata, West Bengal, 700 073; India

Information
- School type: Public school Daytime
- Motto: তমসো মা জ্যোতির্গময়ঃ (Illumine the darkness)
- Religious affiliation: Secular
- Established: January 20, 1817; 209 years ago
- Founder: Raja Rammohan Roy; Radhakanta Deb; Rasamay Dutt; Baidyanath Mukhopadhya; David Hare; Sir Edward Hyde East
- Status: Open
- Locale: College Street
- Sister school: Hare School, Sanskrit Collegiate School, Presidency College
- School board: WBBSE & WBCHSE
- Authority: Government of West Bengal
- Category: Higher Secondary
- Chairman: Governor of West Bengal
- Principal: Subhrojit Dutta
- Staff: 19
- Faculty: 53
- Gender: Boys
- Campus: Urban
- Affiliations: Department of Higher Education, Government of West Bengal
- Alumni: See List of Hindu School people
- Website: Hindu School

Hindu School is a state government-administered school in Kolkata (Calcutta), India. Founded in 1817, it is the oldest modern educational institution in Asia (then known as Hindu College). The institution played a key role during Bengal Renaissance period. It is located on College Street, in the vicinity of Hare School, College Square, Presidency University, Sanskrit College, Calcutta Medical College and the University of Calcutta.

== History ==
With the establishment of the Supreme Court of Calcutta in 1773 many Hindus of Bengal showed eagerness to learn the English language. David Hare, in collaboration with Raja Radhakanta Deb had already taken steps to introduce English education in Bengal. Babu Baidyanath Mukhopadhya advanced the introduction of English as a medium of instruction further by enlisting the support of Sir Edward Hyde East, Chief Justice of the Supreme Court of Fort William who called a meeting of 'European and Hindu Gentlemen' in his house in May 1816. The purpose of the meeting was to "discuss the proposal to establish an institution for giving a liberal education to the children of the members of the Hindu Community". The proposal was received with unanimous approbation and a donation of over Rs. 100,000 was promised for the setting up of the new college. Raja Ram Mohan Roy showed full sympathy for the scheme but chose not to come out in support of the proposal publicly for fear of "alarming the prejudices of his orthodox countrymen and thus marring the whole idea".

The college was formally opened on Monday, 20 January 1817 with 20 'scholars'. The foundation committee of the college, which oversaw its establishment, was headed by Raja Rammohan Roy. The control of the institution was vested in a body of two governors and four directors. The first governors of the college were Maharaja Tejchandra Bahadur of Burdwan and Gopee Mohan Thakoor. The first directors were Gopi Mohun Deb of Sobhabazar, Joykissen Sinha, Radha Madhab Banerjee and Gunganarain Doss. Buddinath Mukherjee was appointed as the first secretary of the college. The newly established college admitted Hindu students only from affluent and upper-caste families.

At first the classes were held in a house belonging to Gorachand Bysack of Garanhatta (later renamed 304, Chitpore Road), which was rented by the college. In January 1818 the college moved to 'Feringhi Kamal Bose's house' which was located nearby in Chitpore. From Chitpore, the college moved to Bowbazar and later to the building that now houses the Sanskrit College on College Street. In 1855 the 'Pathshala' part was renamed as Hindu School and the 'Mahapathshala' part became Presidency College, Kolkata.

== Medium of education ==
Hindu School had been providing education primarily in Bengali medium until 2017, prior to its bi-centenary, when it has been decided to introduce English as the second medium of imparting education.

== Notable alumni ==
Short notable alumni list

- Young Bengals
- Satyendranath Tagore.
- Jyotirindranath Tagore.
- Taraknath Palit
- Bhaktivinoda Thakur
- Womesh Chunder Bonnerjee
- Satyendra Nath Bose
- Chhabi Biswas
- Birendranath Sircar
- Nitin Bose
- Meghnad Saha
- Michael Modhusudan Dutt
- Rajendralal Mitra
- Peary Chand Mitra
- Dr. Pratap Chandra Chunder
- Keshob Chandra Sen
- Nisith Ranjan Ray
- Rishi Rajnarayan Bosu
- Anandamohan Bose
- Kaliprasanna Singha
- Radharaman Mitra
- Kulada Charan Das Gupta
- Sankar Das Banerji
- Santosh Kumar Mitra

== See also ==
- List of schools in Kolkata
- List of schools in West Bengal
