= Indian National Association =

Former nationalist organization of India

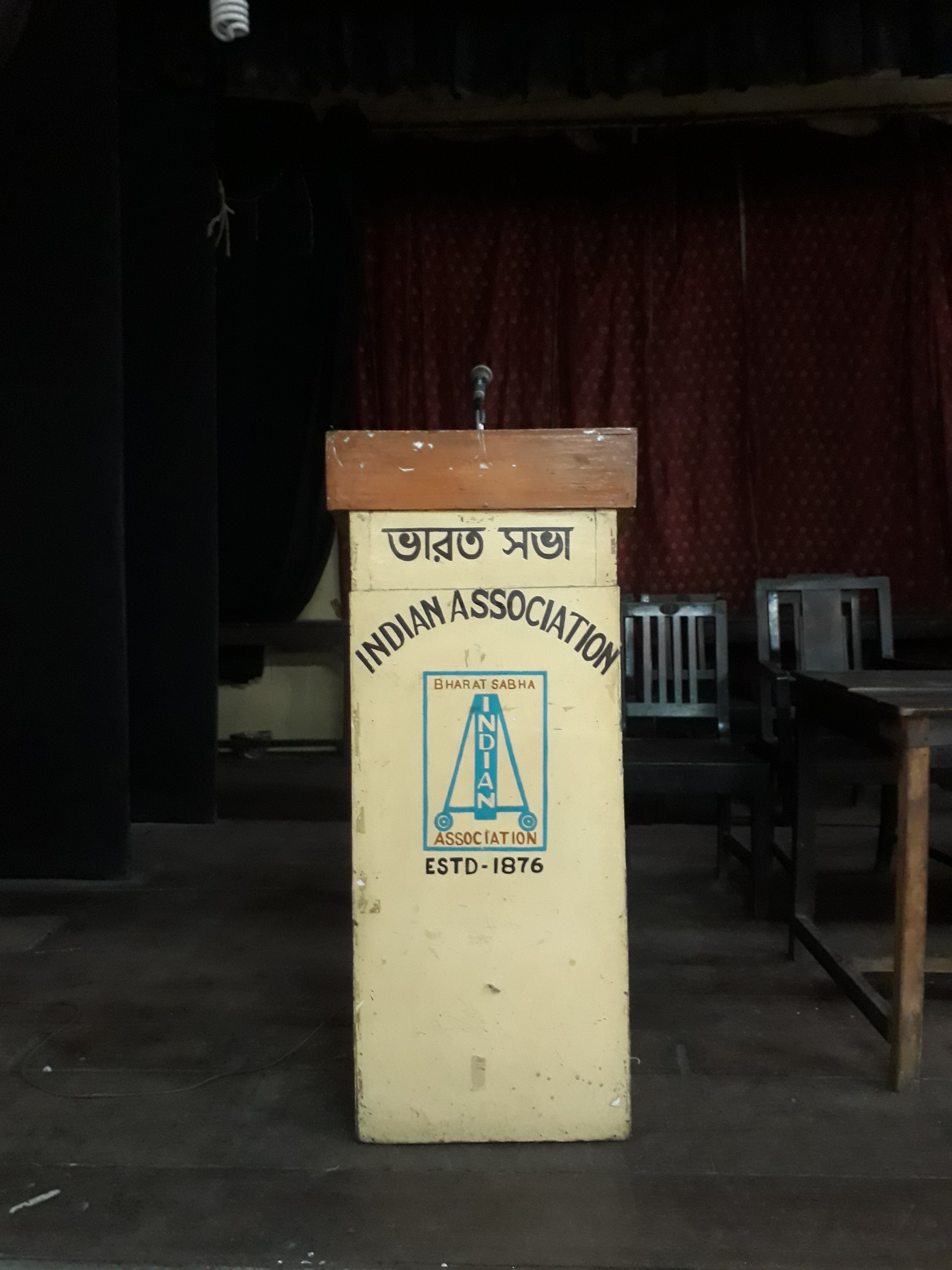
Inside of the Indian Association

The Indian Association was the first avowed nationalist organization founded in British India by Surendranath Banerjee and Ananda Mohan Bose in 1876. The objectives of the Association were for "promoting by every legitimate means the political, intellectual and material advancement of the people". The Association attracted educated Indians and civic leaders from all parts of the country and became an important forum for India's aspirations for independence. It later merged with the Indian National Congress.

== Timeline ==
Indian Association formed in 1876 was one of the pioneer political associations with an all India outlook. During the second half of the 19th century, India witnessed marked changes in social and economic life. One of the striking developments of this time was the growth of political consciousness leading to the birth of political associations and national movements for independence. Prior to the Indian Association, Sisir Kumar Ghosh along with Sambhu Charan Mukherjee founded 'The India League' in Calcutta on 25 September 1875. The nationalist leaders like Ananda Mohan Bose, Durga Mohan Das, Nabagopal Mitra, Surendranath Banerjee and others were associated with this organisation. The League represented the middle class and worked to stimulate the sense of nationalism among the people and to encourage political education. With a broad vision of an all India outlook, the leaders kept the organisation above provincial and communal politics.

But soon the League foundered and shortly afterwards Surendranath Banerjee founded the Indian Association along with his friend Ananda Mohan Bose on 26 July 1876. The leaders who were associated with this organisation were Sivanath Sastri, Kristodas Pal, Dwarakanath Ganguly, Narendra Kishore, and others. Rev Krishna Mohan Banerjee and Ananda Mohan Bose were elected the first President and Secretary respectively of the Association. There was not much difference between the India League and the Indian Association in objectives and outlook. Both of them had worked to help the growth of national awakening and political unity among the educated middle class in India. The very name 'Indian Association' implied that national movement was assuming an all India character in outlook and approach.

The Association started its programme with a number of objects: (a) the creation of a strong body of public opinion in the country; (b) the unity of the Indian races and peoples on the basis of common political interest and aspirations; (c) the promotion of friendly feeling between Hindus and Muslims and (d) the inclusion of the masses in the great public movement of the time.

Prior to Indian National Association, there was no political organisation in Bengal that represented the interest of the middle class and the raiyats. The Association gave the young middle-class community a political platform on a more democratic basis. The leaders of the Association were mostly educated young men, lawyers, and journalists. Surprisingly it did not include big business leaders and landlords as members. In the words of Anil Seal, the Indian Association had worked as a pressure group for graduates and professional men, which claimed to represent 'The middle class'.

Being founded by moderate leaders like Surendranath Banerjea and Ananda Mohan Bose, who were also at the helm of its affairs, the Association was above extreme and narrow Hindu nationalism and parochialism. As a gesture of friendship and goodwill towards the Muslims, they invited Nawab Mohammad Ali to preside over its second annual conference. Indeed, the Indian Association had laid the foundation for the growth of national awakening and political consciousness that ultimately saw the establishment of the Indian national congress in 1885, and for this Surendranath Banerjea deserves credit. In fact, the Association was the forerunner of the Congress.

Right from its birth, the Association started its work in right earnest. The reduction of age limit (1877) from 21 to 19 years for the candidates of the Indian Civil Service examination gave it an excellent opportunity to start an all India movement. Under the leadership of Surendranath Banerjee, the Association strongly protested against this unjust decision. Surendranath was chosen as a special delegate to visit different parts of India to secure support for the memorial that the Association intended to send to British Parliament. Surendranath's tour of India was a great success. It enkindled a new spirit of nationalism, which helped to create a feeling of national unity on important political issues. He was the first politician to receive all India popularity. Under his able leadership, the Association demanded simultaneous holding of civil service examination in England and India and Indianisation of higher administrative posts. Besides, the Association led the campaign against the repressive arms act (1878), the vernacular press act, and the exemption of duties on cotton goods. Public meetings were held in Calcutta demanding the removal of racial inequality between Indians and Europeans and reduction of the salt tax. The Association gave its support to the Bengal tenancy act of 1885 and demanded self Government in India.

It is true that with the establishment of the Indian National Congress, the Association gradually lost much of its political importance. Yet it must be given the credit for initiating the idea of holding an all India conference with representatives from every province. The first Indian National Conference was accordingly held in Calcutta in 1883. The second National Conference, organised by the Association, held in 1885 in Calcutta. It coincided with that of the National Congress, which was meeting for the first time in Bombay in December 1885. The Indian Association expressed its solidarity and decided its merger with the Congress when the National Congress was organising its second annual conference in Calcutta in December 1886.

It is true that the Indian Association lost its earlier political importance as soon as Congress began to function as an all India organisation. Even then when the partition of Bengal (1905) occurred, the Association under the leadership of Surendranath Banerjea became very active. The Association, under the leadership of Surendranath, organised the Boycott and swadeshi movement against the partition, raised a National Fund, drew up a National Educational Policy and, in 1906, formally inaugurated the National Council of Education. Violent agitation compelled the government to revoke the partition of Bengal in December 1911. After the annulment of the partition, the Indian Association lost much of its political importance and continued its existence being engaged mainly in social works.
