= Konnagar =

- Town
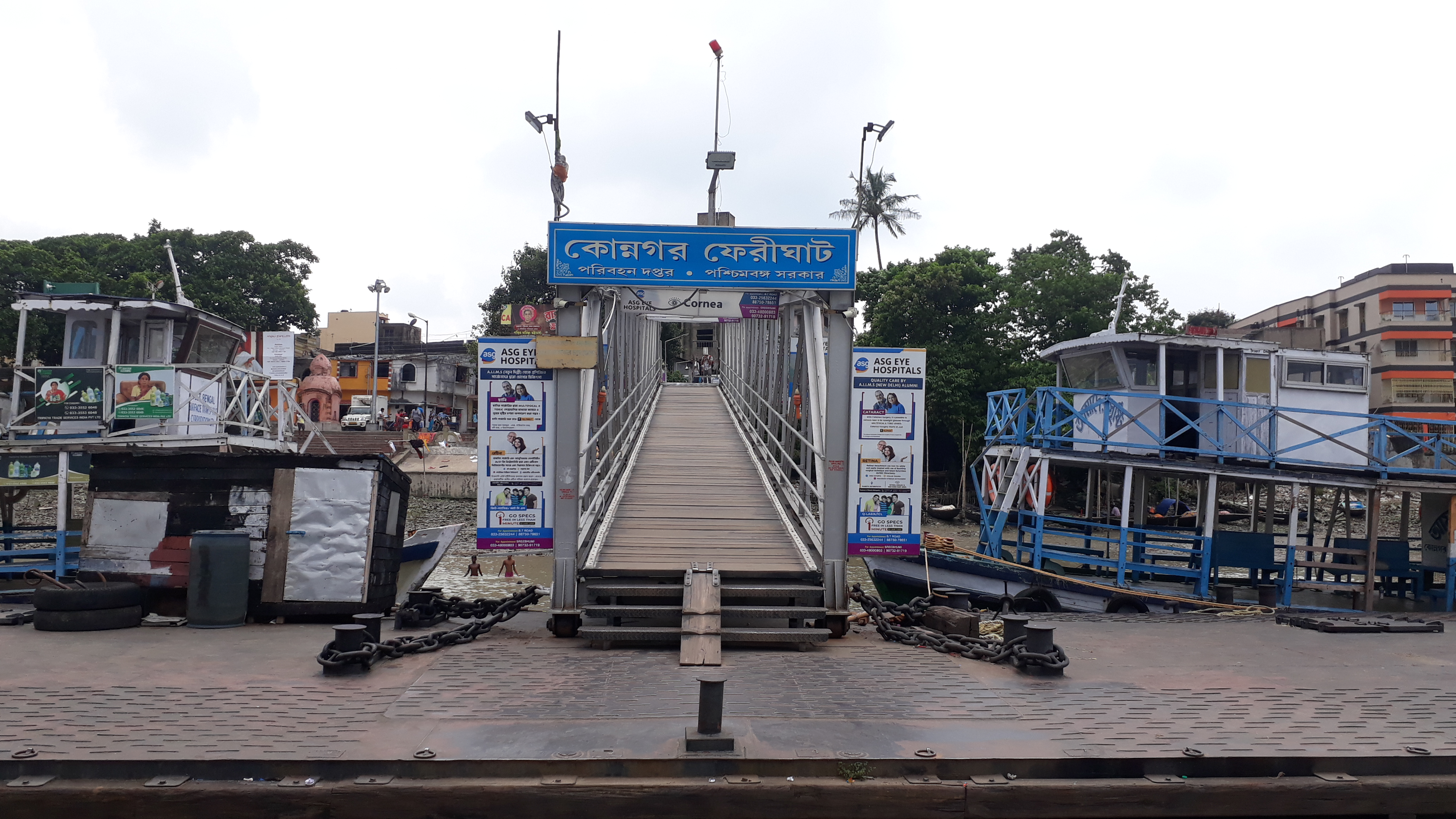
- Konnagar Ferry Ghat which connects Konnagar to Sodepur

- Location in West Bengal, India Konnagar (India) Konnagar (Asia)
- Coordinates: 22.7032°N 88.3185°E
- Country: India
- State: West Bengal
- Division: Burdwan
- District: Hooghly

Government
  - Type: Municipality
  - Body: Konnagar Municipality

Area
  - Total: 4.67 km^{2} (1.80 sq mi)
- Elevation: 14 m (46 ft)

Population (2011)
  - Total: 76,172
  - Density: 16,300/km^{2} (42,200/sq mi)

Languages
  - Official: Bengali
  - Additional official: English
- Time zone: UTC+5:30 (IST)
- PIN: 712235
- Telephone code: +91 33
- Vehicle registration: WB
- Lok Sabha constituency: Serampore
- Vidhan Sabha constituency: Uttarpara
- Website: www.konnagarmunicipality.org

Konnagar is a town and a municipality of Hooghly district in the Indian state of West Bengal. The town is under the jurisdiction of the Uttarpara police station in Serampore subdivision. It is a part of the area covered by the Kolkata Metropolitan Development Authority.

== History ==
In 1931, Tomáš Baťa, the Czechoslovak shoe tycoon, established his first Indian operation in Konnagar. By 1936, the plant was phased out. In May 1931, Baťa sold his business interests to his brother Jan Antonín Baťa, who founded Batanagar, Bata's first permanent shoe factory in India. The Bata brand was launched on 24 August 1894 in Zlín, then in Austria-Hungary (now in the Czech Republic). The company first established itself in India in 1931 by renting a building to start an experimental shoe production plant in Konnagar, with 75 Czech experts. Jan Antonín Baťa also built factories in Digha, near Patna, and elsewhere in India, employing more than 7,000 people. Batanagar, under Baťa's ideals, became one of the bigger suburban towns near Kolkata.

Konnagar has been the home of many notable personalities. It was the ancestral home of the great nationalist and religious leader Sri Aurobindo and noted physicist Sisir Kumar Mitra. Shafiur Rahman one of the martyrs of the language movement in East Pakistan was born in Konnagar.

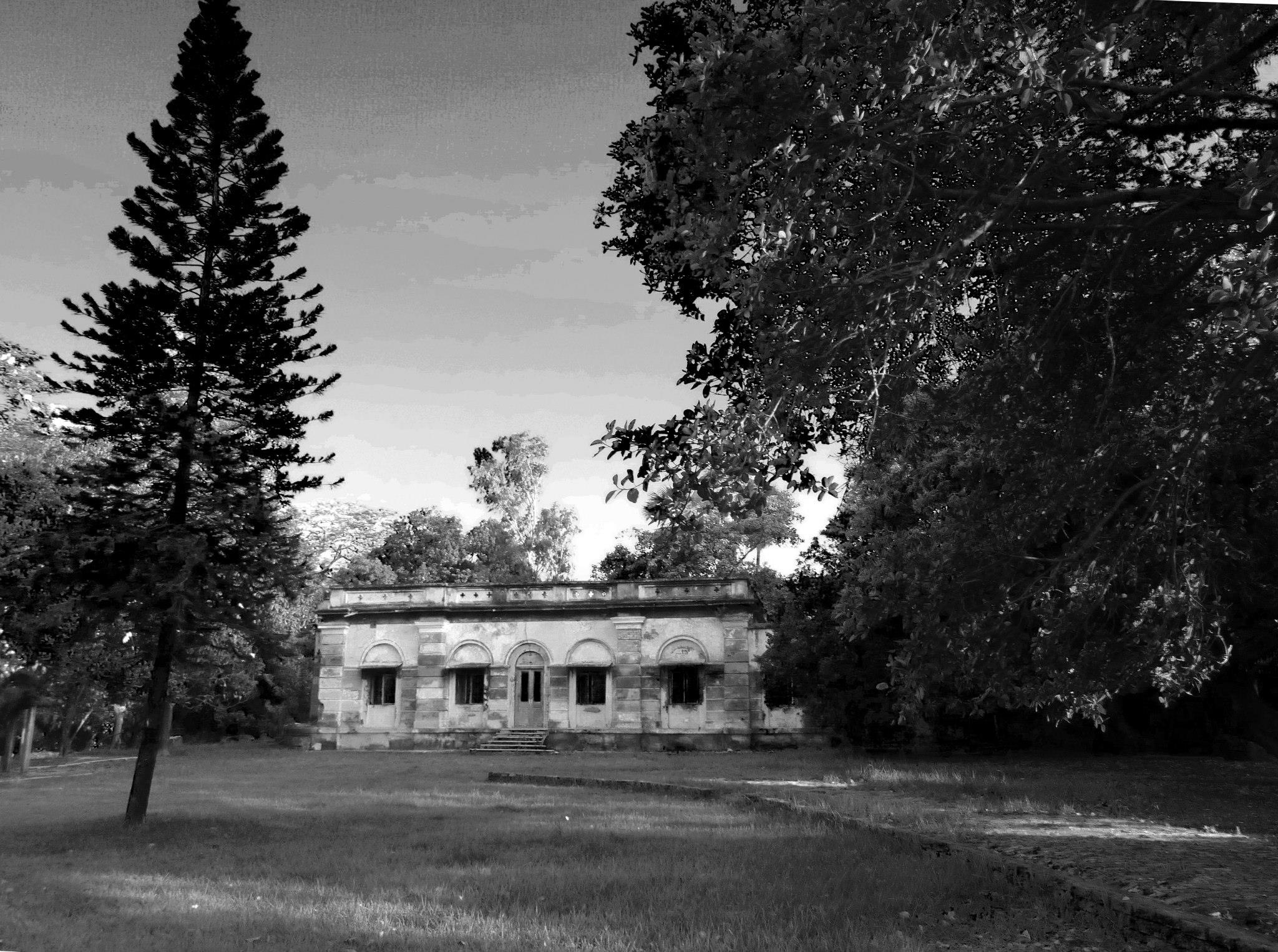
Abanindranath Tagore's Konnagar Baganbari

The town had been visited by the greats of Tagore, Mahasweta Devi and many others. Tagore was believed to be just a child when he and his family came to this town to escape the onslaught of Dengue which hit Kolkata. He revisited the town again when he was 19. He came to visit the Brahmasomaj Ghat along with his father Maharshi Debendranath. Shibram Chakraborty used to live here for a brief period of time in his childhood near G.T.Road beside Konnagar High School.Sri Aurobindo's father and famous Indian geographer Shashi Bhusan Chatterjee happened to be a pupil of Konnagar High School established in the 19th century. And the town though got recognition chiefly due to the initiatives of Sib Chandra Deb, its antiquity can hardly be denied. Its reference is there even in the 500-year-old Mangal-Kāvya.

Konnagar is well known for its Shakuntala Kali Temple. This temple is considered to be very sacred and people from various parts of West Bengal pay a visit. This is a Puja that was started by the Chakraborty Bari Zamindars and today it has become an important event in Konnagar's calendar. The annual Puja is held in the Bengali calendar month of Boisakh (April). A very interesting fact about this Puja is that the idol is completed on the day of Puja itself. There are grand Fairs organised on the grounds adjacent to the temple.

Apart from this Puja, there is another important puja in this small city. Rajrajeshwari Puja has been organised in Konnagar for over 300 years now. It is held on the eve of Maghi Purnima (February).

== Geography ==
Shafiur Rahman, Bengali language movement martyr memorial

Konnagar is located at 22.7032°N 88.3185°E. It has an average elevation of 14 metres (45 feet). Konnagar is positioned between Rishra and Hind Motor on the Howrah-Bardhaman main line and Grand Trunk Road. It is located on the west bank of the River Hooghly. Its approximate area is 4.32 km^{2}.

West side of the Konnagar railway station is called Nabagram and Kanaipur. Most of the population in Nabagram is migrated from East Bengal. Being situated only 13.5 km from the heart of Kolkata, the area enjoys semi urban status. Konnagar has an extensive fruit and vegetable market which is visited by people from the nearby areas. The market is famous for its affordable prices. Konnagar is filled with many cultural clubs which makes it a culturally rich town.

Konnagar is also known for its famous Shakuntala Kalitala Mandir, Baro Mandir, Rajrajeswari Mandir, Shankaracharya Temple, Bungalow of Abanindranath Tagore, Paternal house of Rishi Aurobindo Ghosh, Bramhosomaj Ghat and house made by Raja Rammohan Roy. The first ever workshop of Bata Shoe Company Ltd. in India was initially set up in Konnagar in 1932. Baro Mandir (Dwadosh Mandir Ghat/Twelve Temples) was built in 1821 in the bank of Ganges river. The Bungalow of Abanindranath Tagore is a heritage place of the city.

== Demographics ==
Languages spoken in Konnagar Town (2011)
1. Bengali (81.0%)
2. Hindi (15.1%)
3. Urdu (0.95%)
4. Telugu (0.84%)
5. Gujarati (0.65%)
6. Others (1.44%)

As per 2011 Census of India Konnagar had a total population of 76,172 of which 38,653 (51%) were males and 37,519 (49%) were females. Population below 6 years was 5,815. The total number of literates in Konnagar was 63,911 (90.84% of the population over 6 years).

The following Municipalities and Census Towns in Hooghly district were part of Kolkata Urban Agglomeration in 2011 census: Bansberia (M), Hugli-Chinsurah (M), Bara Khejuria (Out Growth), Shankhanagar (CT), Amodghata (CT), Chak Bansberia (CT), Naldanga (CT), Kodalia (CT), Kulihanda (CT), Simla (CT), Dharmapur (CT), Bhadreswar (M), Champdani (M), Chandannagar (M Corp.), Baidyabati (M), Serampore (M), Rishra (M), Rishra (CT), Bamunari (CT), Dakshin Rajyadharpur (CT), Nabagram Colony (CT), Konnagar (M), Uttarpara Kotrung (M), Raghunathpur (PS-Dankuni) (CT), Kanaipur (CT) and Keota (CT).

== Transport ==
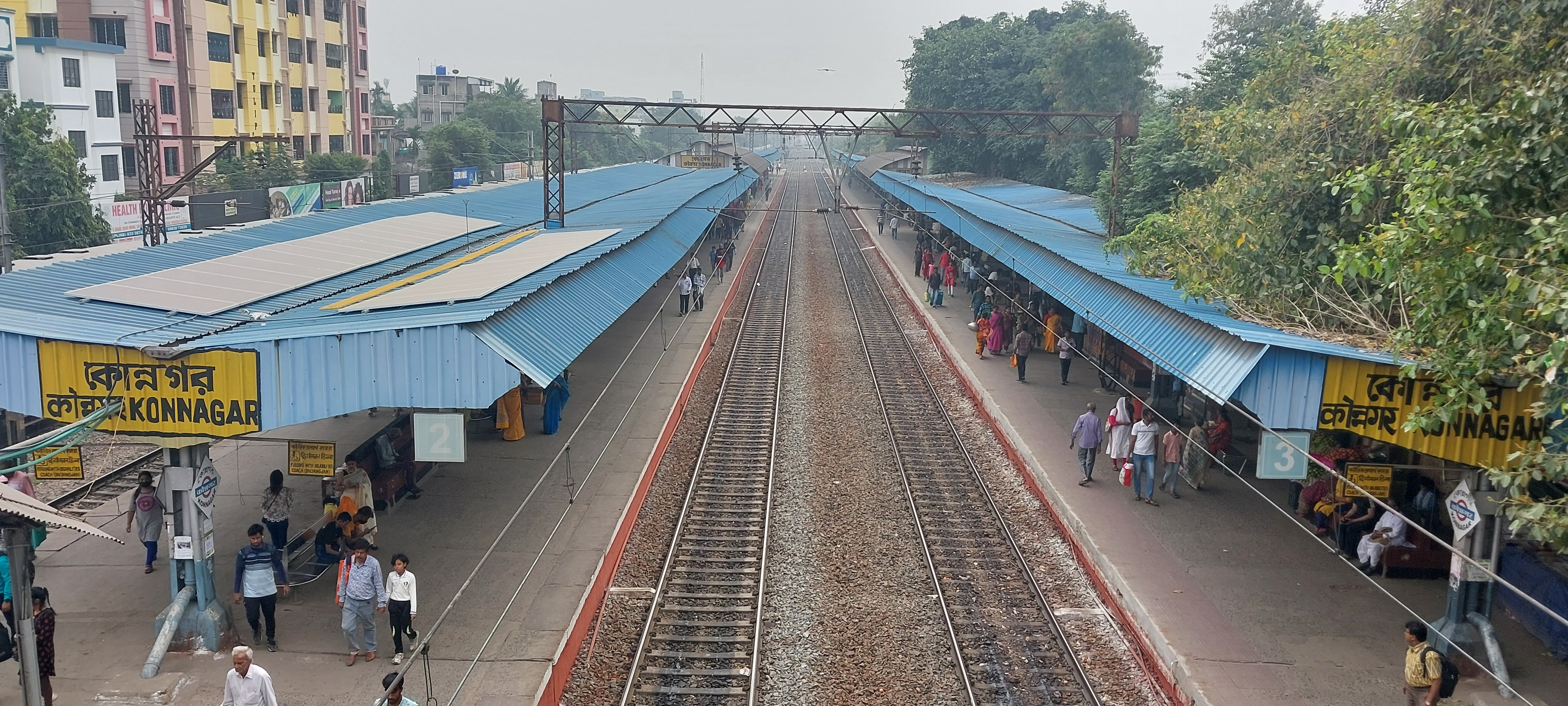
Konnagar railway station at Konnagar

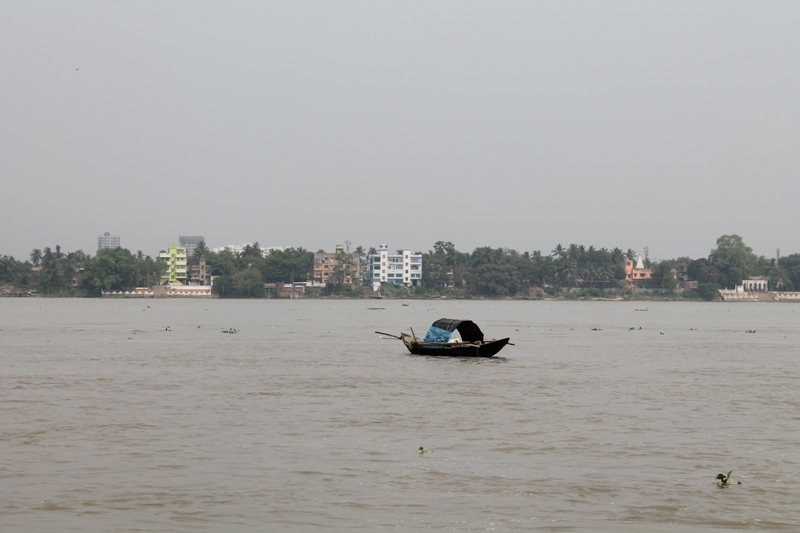
Hooghly River in Konnagar

Konnagar is well connected with Howrah through trains. Konnagar lies on the Howrah-Bardhaman main line. Konnagar railway station has three platforms (1 for Down train, 2 for both and 3 for Up trains). Konnagar is also connected to Kolkata through roadways by State Highway 6/ Grand Trunk Road.

=== Private bus ===
- 2 Chunchura Court - Dakshineswar
- 285 Serampore - New Town
- 3 Serampore - Bagbazar/Salt Lake
- D4/1 Serampore - Bagbazar( up to Belgachia)

There are regular auto services available also towards Bally and Serampore. Apart from this, there are Ferry Services to Greater Kolkata (Panihati) on the other end of Ganges banks. Now ferry service becomes more frequent. Netaji Subhas Chandra Bose International Airport is 17 km from Konnagar.

== Education ==
Nabagram Hiralal Paul College, a general degree college, was established in 1957, at Nabagram, Konnagar. Prof. Sudhangshu Sekhar Bhattacharya, a contributor to the build-up of the college. In Konnagar, there are quite a few higher secondary high schools including Konnagar Boys' High School (established in 1854), Hindu Girls' High School, Rajendra Smriti Vidyalaya, Nabagram Hiralal Paul Girls High School and Nabagram Vidyapith. There are many government secondary schools including Ashalata Balika Vidyalaya, Konnagar K.P Balika, Konnagar Sri Arabinda Vidyapaith. All the above mentioned institutions are government aided.

== Notable people ==
- Aurobindo Ghosh (Rishi), a famous freedom fighter.
- Premendra Mitra a renowned Bengali writer is connected with Konnagar by family.
- Shafiur Rahman, martyr of the 1952 Language Movement.
- Digambar Mitra, famous Kolkata-based descendant of Mitra family of Konnagar.
- Sisir Kumar Ghosh, Social reformer.
- Sisir Kumar Mitra, Scientist and pioneer of radio-science in India.
