= Anandamohan Bose =

Indian nationalist

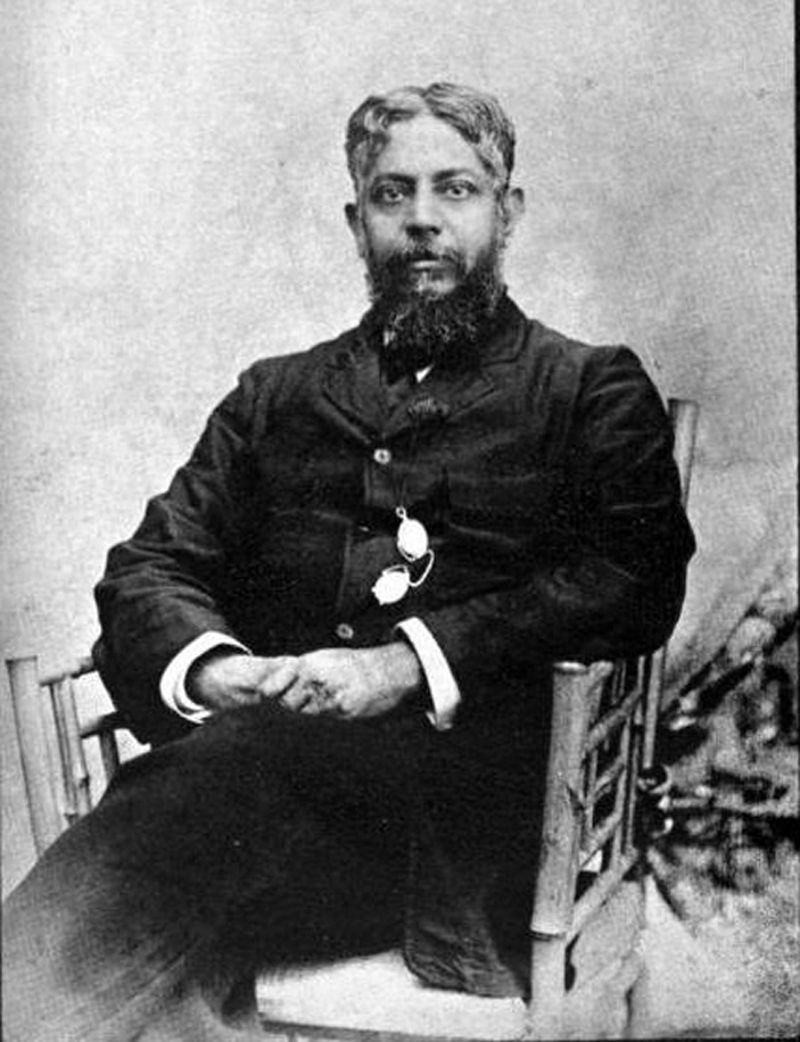
- Anandamohan Bose
- Born: 23 September 1847; Joysiddhi, Itna, Kishoreganj District, British India
- Died: 20 August 1906 (aged 58); Calcutta, Bengal Presidency, British India
- Education: University of Cambridge
- Occupations: Politician, academic, social reformer, lawyer
- Known for: Co-founder of Indian National Association
- Political party: Indian National Congress
- Spouse: Swarnaprabha Bose

Ananda Mohan Bose (Bengali: আনন্দমোহন বসু) (23 September 1847 – 20 August 1906) was a Bengali politician, academic, social reformer, and lawyer during the British Raj. He co-founded the Indian National Association, one of the earliest Indian political organizations, and later became a senior leader and later President of the Indian National Congress. In 1874, he became the first Indian Wrangler (a student who has completed the third year of the Mathematical Tripos with first-class honours) of the Cambridge University. He was also a prominent religious leader of Brahmoism and with Sivanath Sastri a leading light of Adi Dharm.

== Early life ==
Ananda Mohan was born at Jaysiddhi village in Mymensingh District of Bengal province in British India (in Itna Upazila of Kishoreganj District of present-day Bangladesh). His father was Padmalochan Bose, and his mother was Umakishori Devi. He passed his entrance examination from the Mymensingh Zilla School under the University of Calcutta and got first division in 1862. He passed his F.A. and B.A. examinations from the Presidency College, Calcutta and secured first position in both examinations. In 1870, he went to England for higher education along with Keshab Chandra Sen. Ananda Mohan Bose studied mathematics at the University of Cambridge from 1870. He earned a First Class degree and was the first Indian wrangler. While in Britain, Bose also studied to become a barrister and was called to the Bar in 1874. In 1870, he received the Premchand Roychand Scholarship. .

== Anandamohan and the Sadharan Brahmo Samaj ==
Anandamohan was a supporter of Brahmo Dharma from his student life. He was officially converted to Brahmo religion along with his wife Swarnaprabha Devi (sister of Jagadish Chandra Bose) by Keshab Chandra Sen in 1869. The young members of Brahmo Samaj differed with Keshab Chandra Sen regarding matters like child marriage, running of the organisation and various other matters. As a result, on 15 May 1878 he, along with Sivanath Shastri, Sib Chandra Deb, Umesh Chandra Dutta and others founded the Sadharan Brahmo Samaj. He was elected its first president. On 27 April 1879 he founded the Chhatrasamaj, the student's wing of the Sadharan Brahmo Samaj movement. In 1879, he founded the City College, Calcutta, as an initiative by the movement.

== His political and educational contributions ==
Anandamohan was the founder of City School and City College in Kolkata. He founded the Students' Association with an objective of promoting nationalism among the students and along with Surendranath Banerjee and Sivanath Shastri organised regular lectures. He was also associated with Calcutta University and was elected a member of Education Commission. He protested against changing the composition of Educational Service.

Anandamohan was interested in politics from his student days. While in England, he founded "India Society" along with a few other Indians. He was also associated with "Indian League" founded by Sisir Kumar Ghosh. He was the secretary of "Indian Association" till 1884 and was its president throughout his lifetime. He protested against acts like Vernacular Press Act and the reduction of the maximum age for Indian Civil Service Examination. He presided in the protest meeting against Partition of Bengal held at Federation Hall in 1905, where his address was read by Rabindranath Tagore due to his ill health.
