= Nabagram Vidyapith =

High school in Konnagar, India

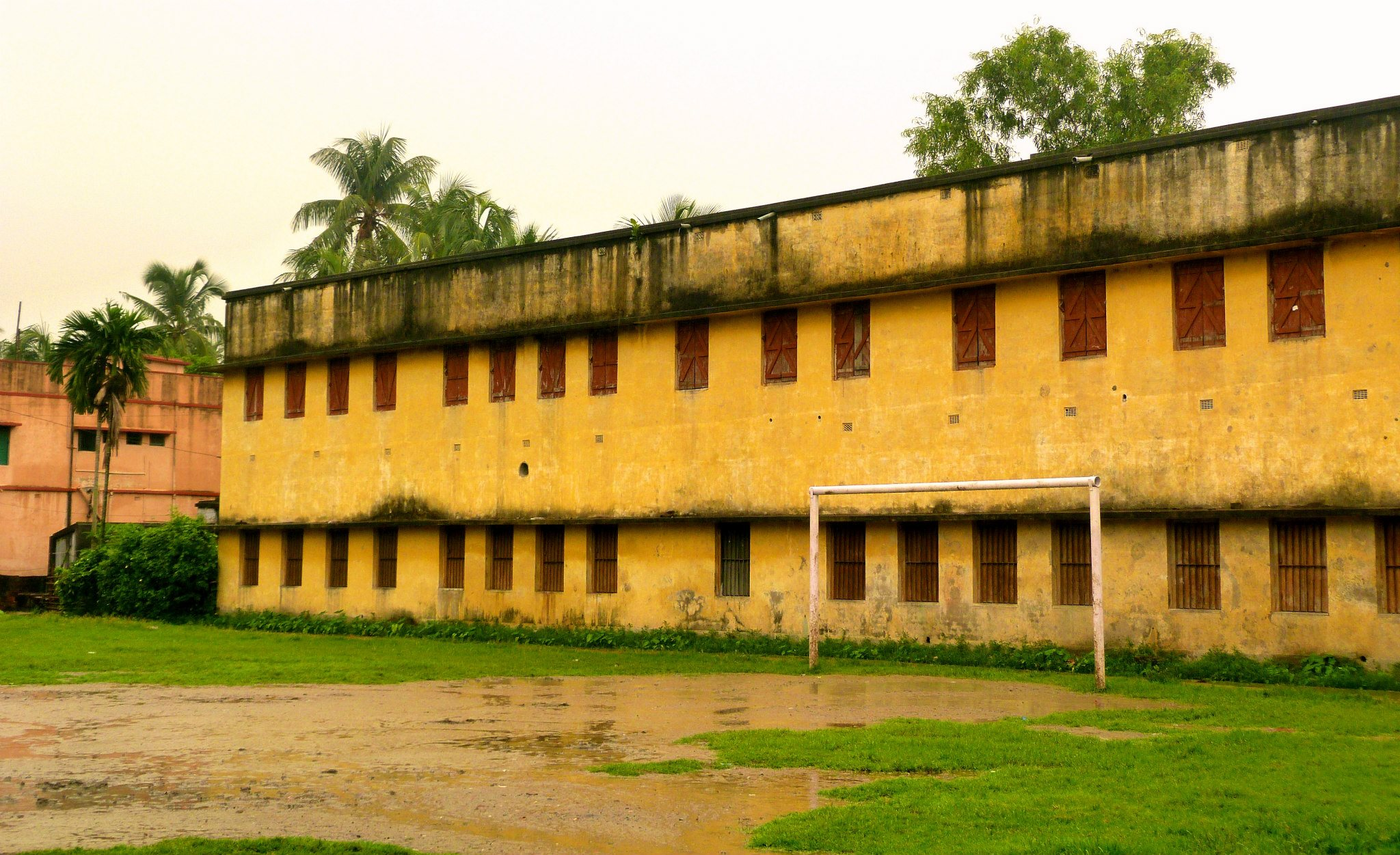

Location
- Adibartama, Nabagram, Konnagar; Hooghly- 712246; Srirampore subdivision West Bengal, India; Adibartma, Konnagar, Nabagram

Information
- Motto: A faithful man who is absorbed in transcendental knowledge and who subdues his senses quickly attains the supreme spiritual peace.
- Established: 1948
- Category: Boys'
- Headmaster: Mrs. Soma Chowdhury
- Classes: V to X XI, XII (Commerce & Science); XI, XII (Vocational)
- Affiliations: WBBSE (for Madhyamik); WBCHSE (for Higher Secondary); WBSCVET (for Higher Secondary Vocational)
- Website: http://www.nabagramvidyapith.org/ https://nbalumni.wordpress.com/

Nabagram Vidyapith is a boys high school located in Konnagar, Hooghly District, in the state of West Bengal, India.

== Organisation ==
Nabagram Vidyapith was established on 9 January 1948. Located at Konnagar, Hooghly.

This institution is affiliated to the West Bengal Board of Secondary Education. The medium of instruction is Bengali. The current principal of the institution is Mrs. Soma Choudhury. The institution presently consists of 1,100 students and 45 teachers.

== Alumni association ==
The official alumni association (Nabagram Vidyapith Alumni Association) has been formed in the year of 2018.

== Subjects ==
=== Higher Secondary ===
1. education
2. Commerce
3. science

=== Vocational ===
1. Computer Assembly and Maintenance
2. Automobile Mechanics
3. Home Science

== Notable alumni ==
- Goutam Chattopadhyay, senior research scientist, Jet Propulsion Laboratory (NASA)
- Binod Ghosha, writer, recipient of President's Award.
- Sanjib Bandyopadhyay, deputy director general at India Meteorological Department, Calcutta (Alipore Weather Office)
- Kaushik Mukhopadhyay, deputy director at Directorate General of Civil Aviation (India)
- Amalendu Dasgupta, director at Development Consultants Private Limited, Kolkata (DC Group)

== Gallery ==
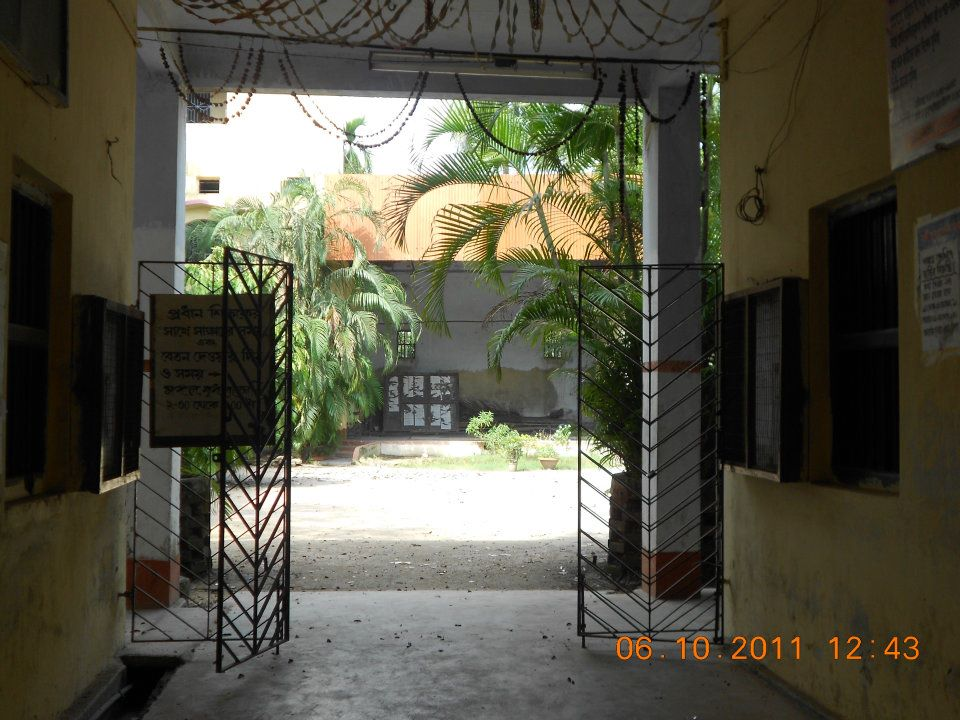
Vidyapith entrance

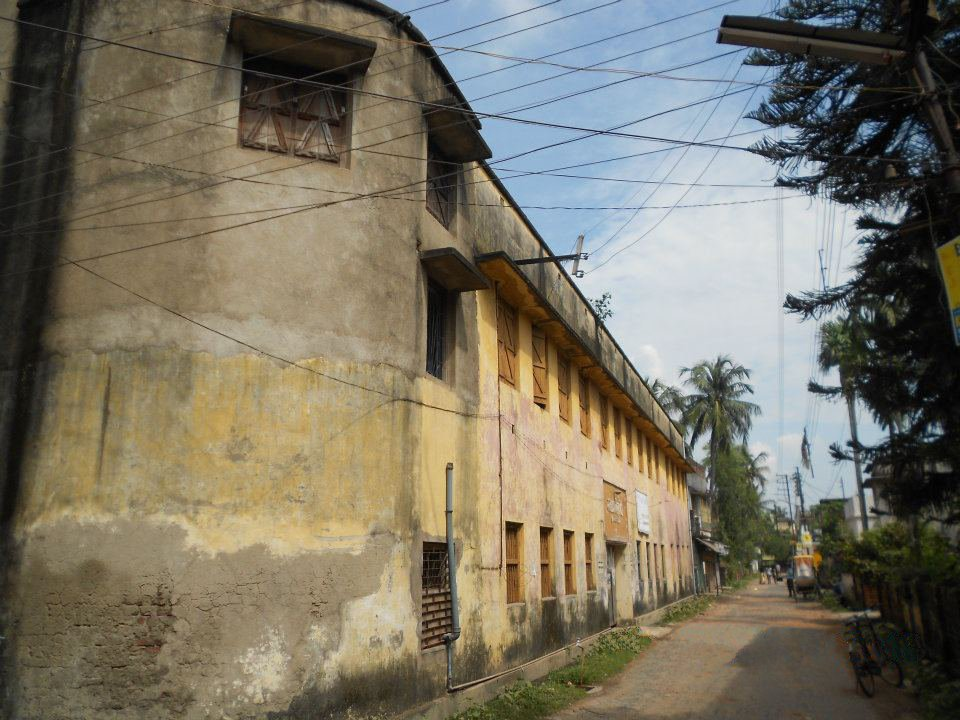
School Building

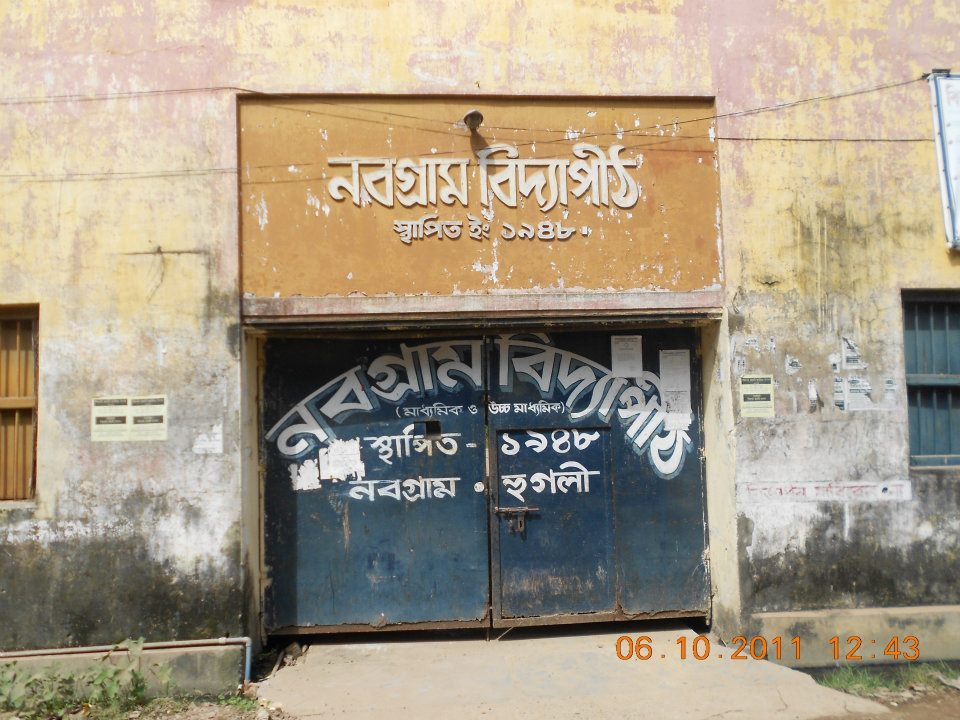
Nabagram Vidyapith school gate mentions in Bengali script - Established in 1948

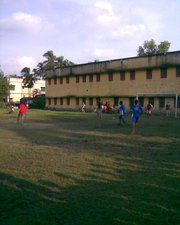
Nabagram Vidyapith Playground

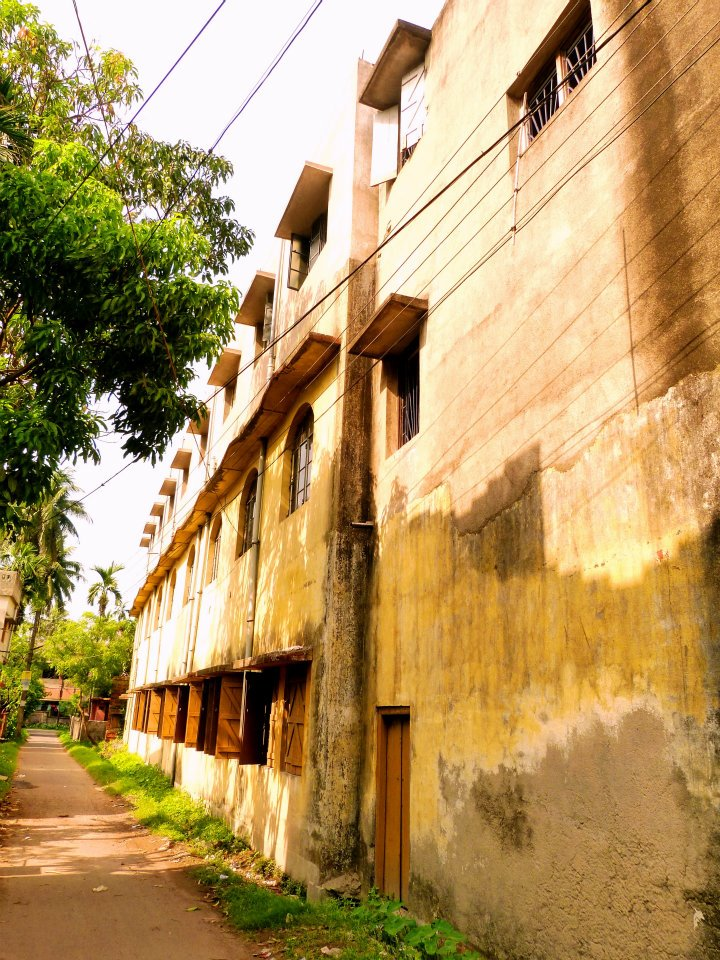
Backside of the School

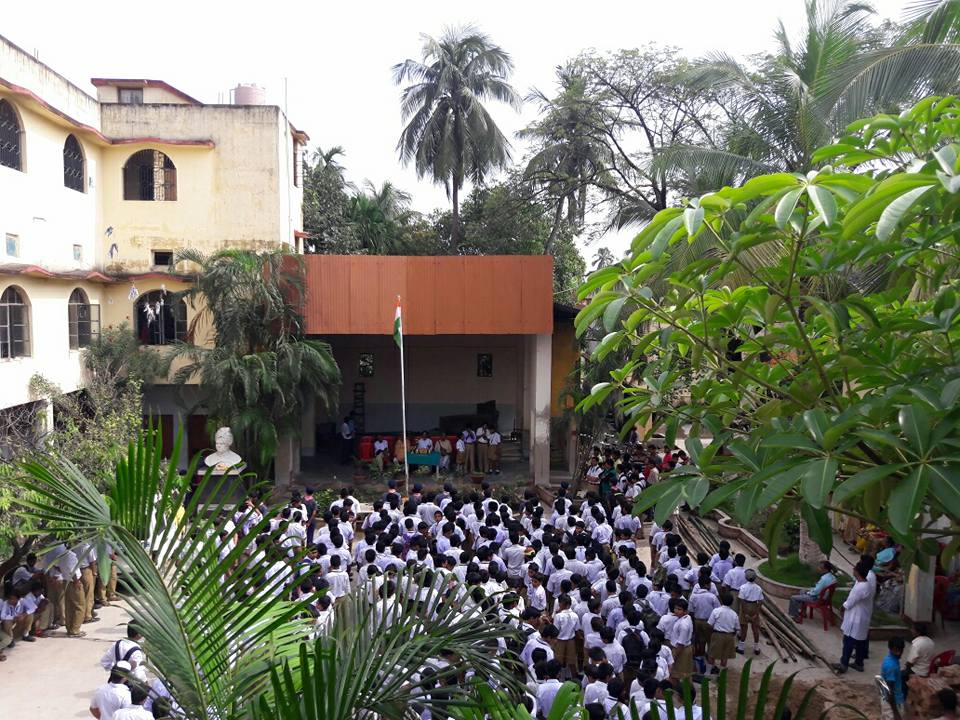
Prayer Ground

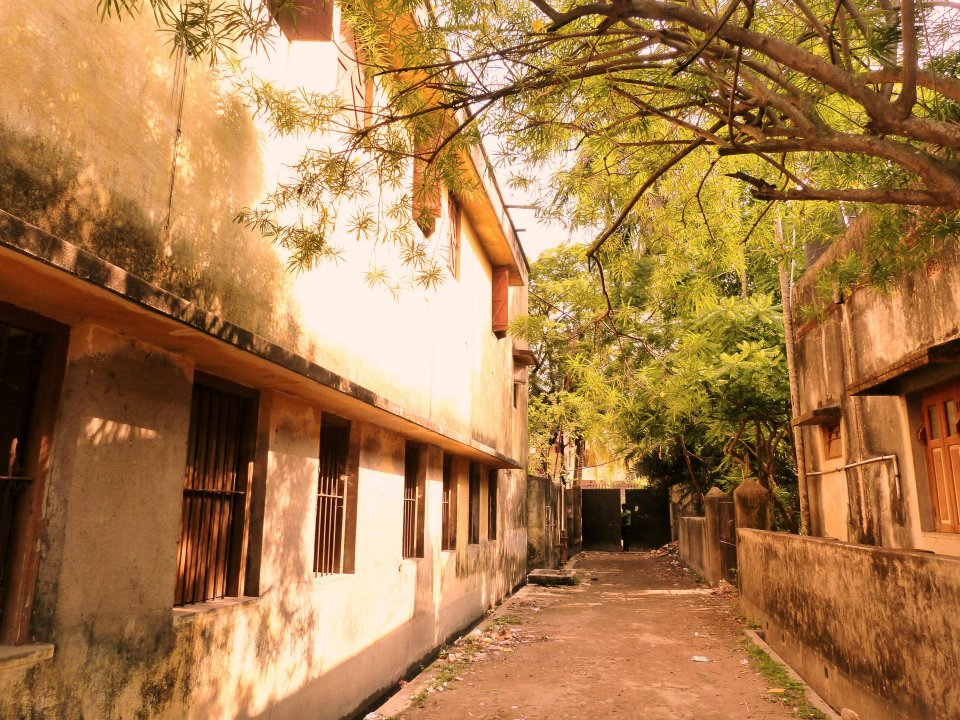
Exit Gate

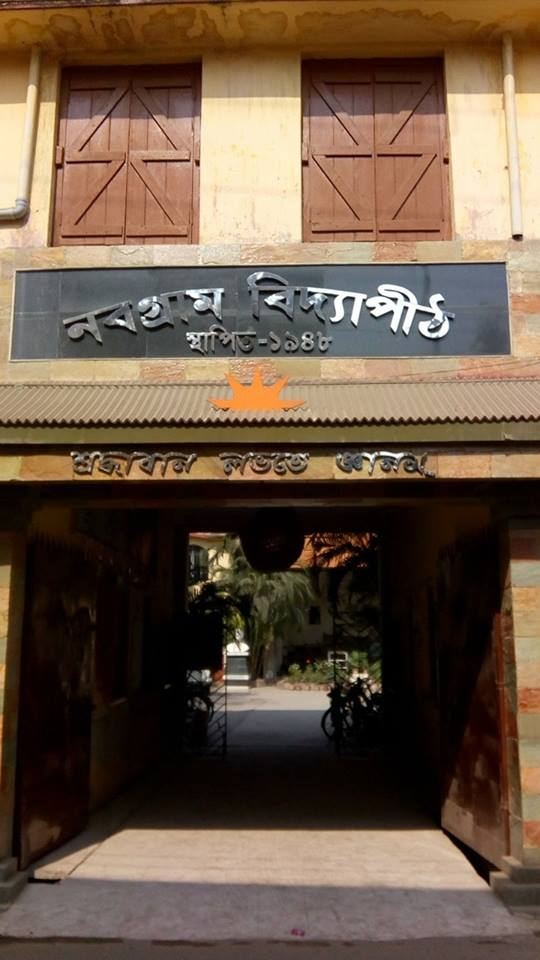
New Entry Gate

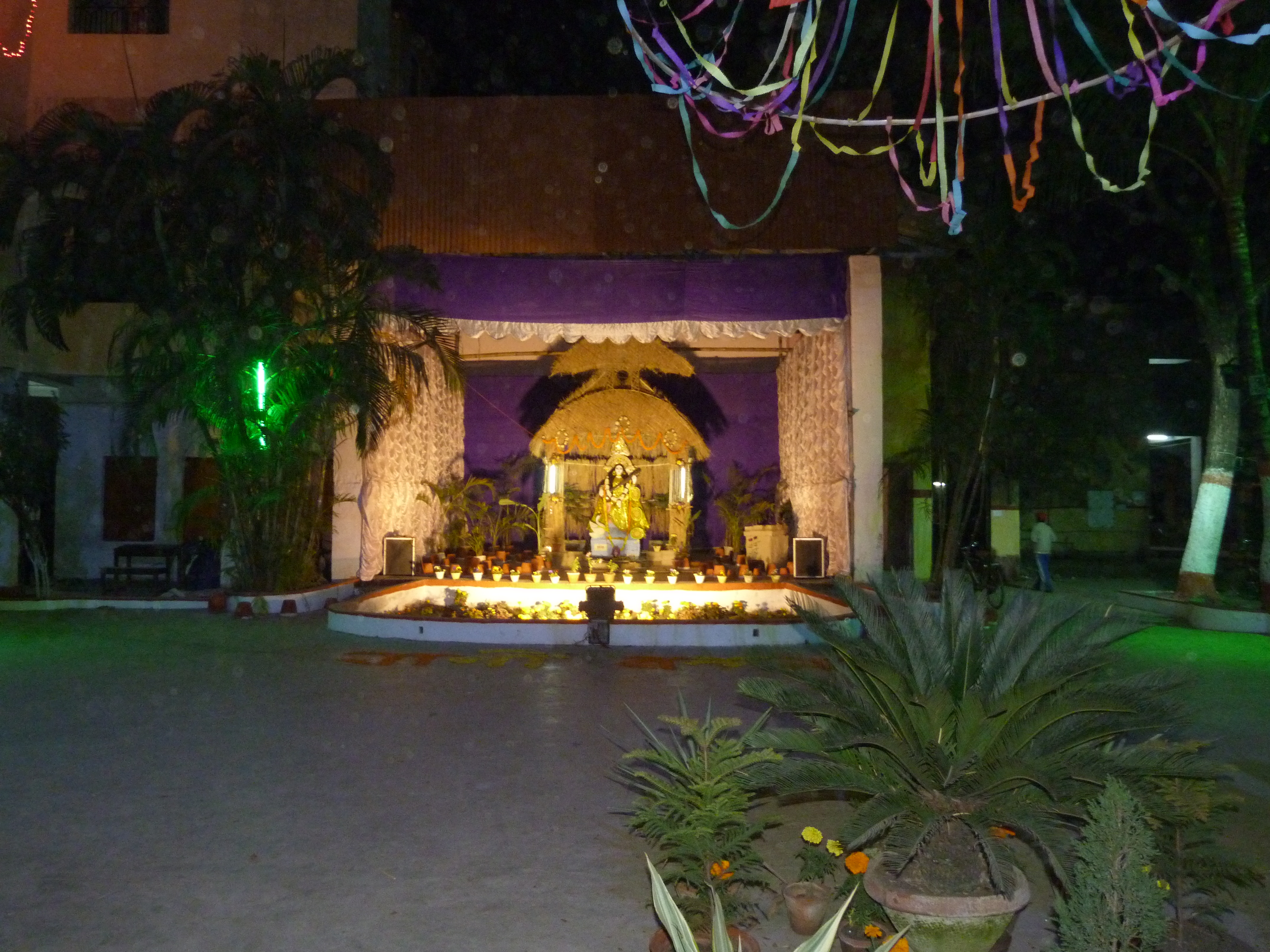
During Saraswati Puja

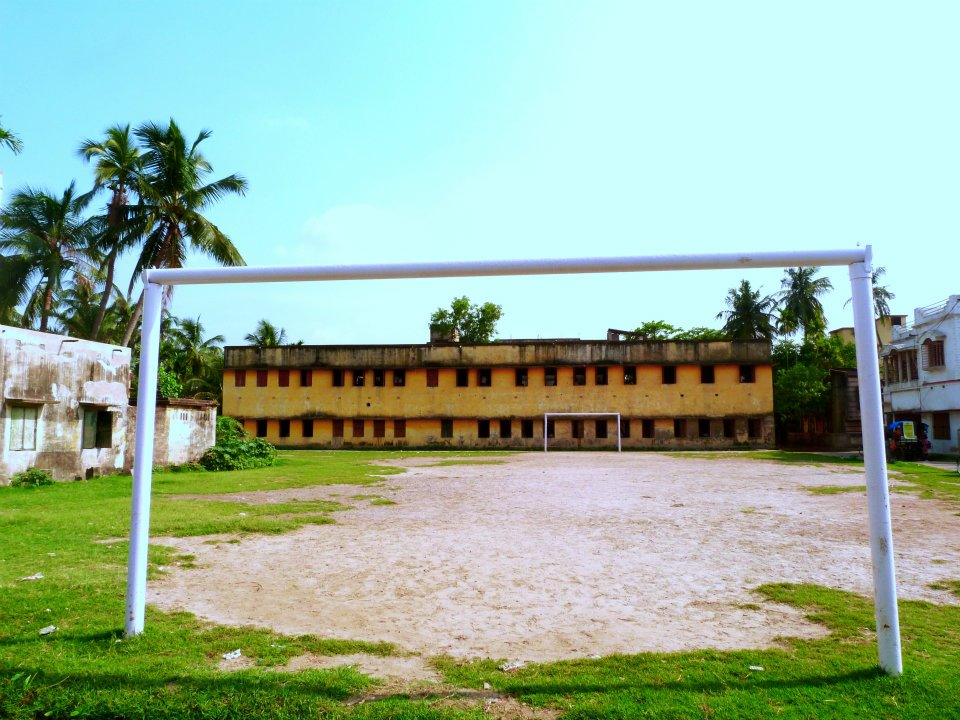
School Ground

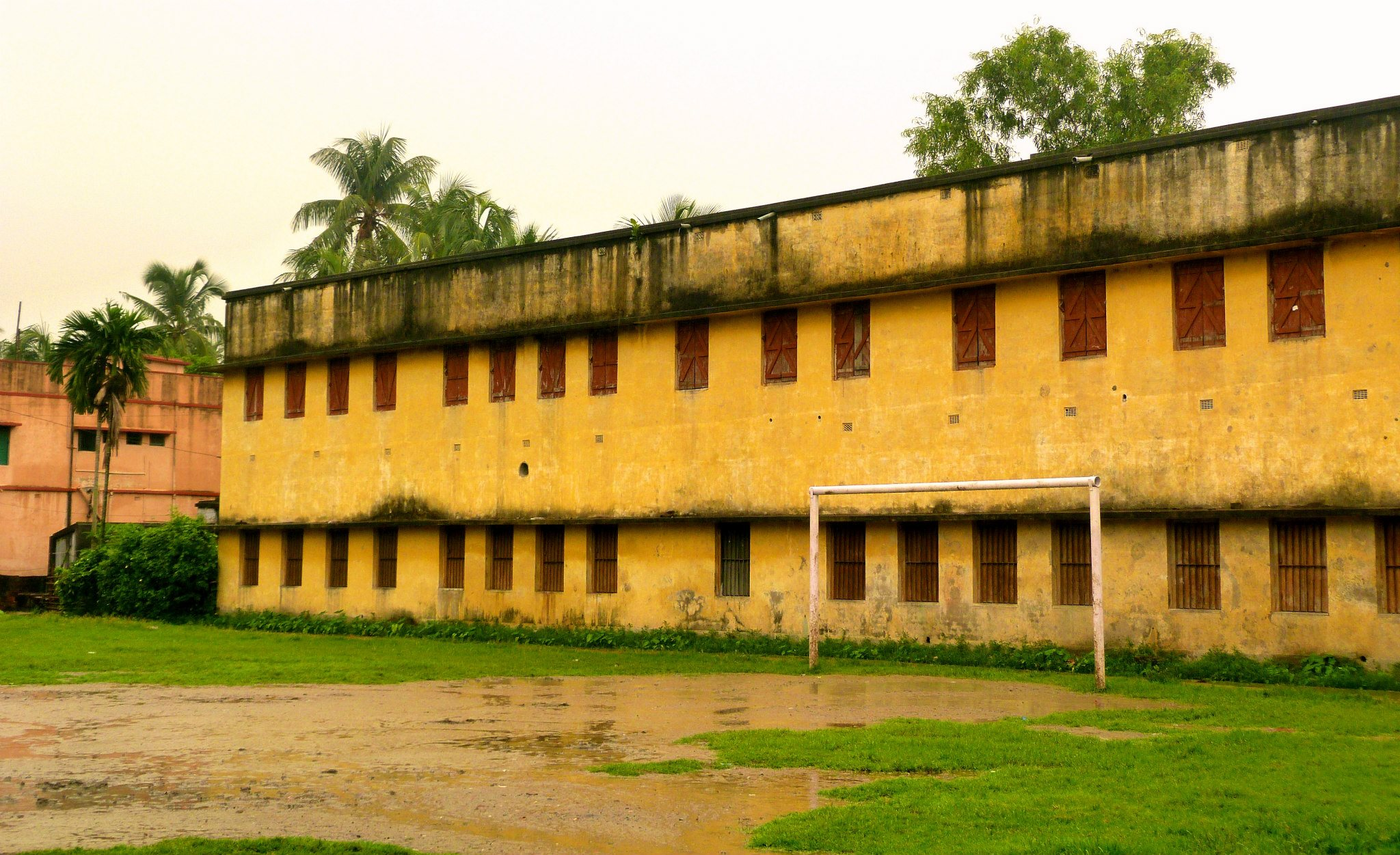
Building No. 2

== See also ==
- Rishra Brahmananda Keshab Chandra High School
- Mahesh Sri Ramkrishna Ashram Vidyalaya (Higher Secondary)
- Rishra High School
