= Baidyanath Mukhopadhyay =

Educationist

- Born: Calcutta, Bengal Presidency, Company Raj
- Known for: Social reformer during Bengal Renaissance
- Scientific career
- Fields: Educationism

Baidyanath Mukhopadhyay was an educationist, born in Calcutta, and a social reformer during the Bengal Renaissance, who contributed to the foundation of the Hindu School.

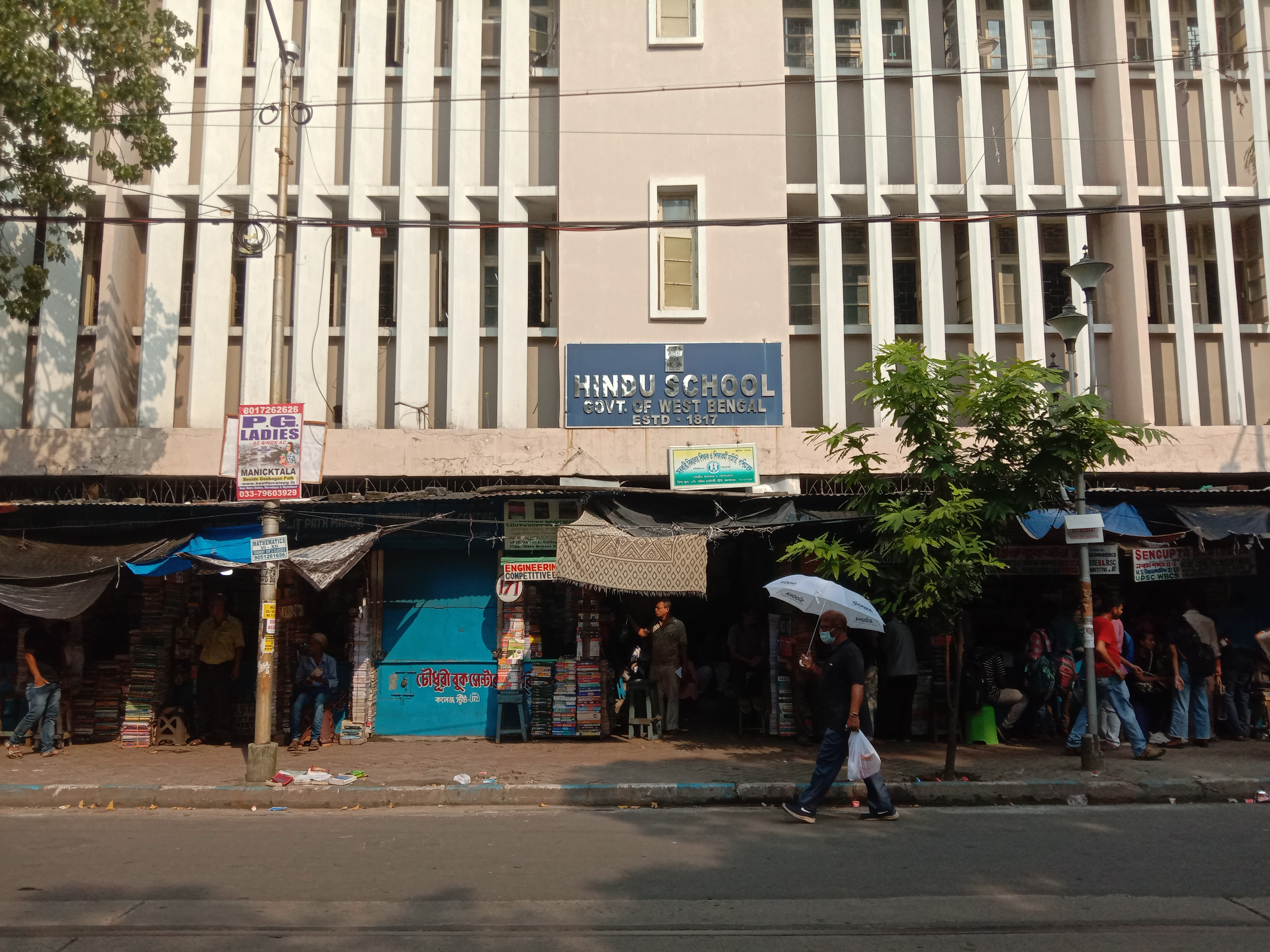
The Hindu School in College Street, August 2022, which was co-founded by Mukhopadhyay.
