= Taraknath Palit =

Indian lawyer and philanthropist

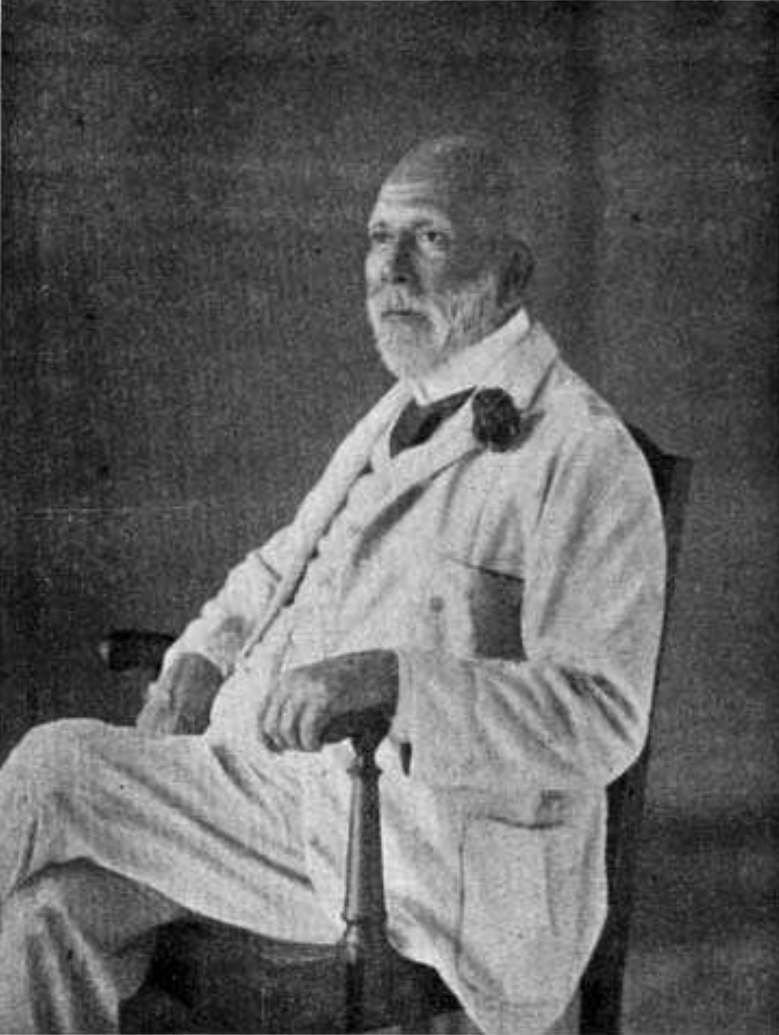
- Taraknath Palit, c. 1912
- Born: 1831; Calcutta, Bengal Presidency, British India
- Died: 3 October 1914 (aged 82–83)
- Occupation: Lawyer
- Known for: Philanthropist, social worker

Sir Taraknath Palit (1831–1914) was an Indian lawyer from the Bengal Presidency and a philanthropist. He was associated with the Swadeshi Movement during the Partition of Bengal and was one of the key figures behind the establishment of Ballygunge Science College of the Calcutta University and Jadavpur University.

== Early life ==
Taraknath was born in 1831 in Kolkata, the only son of millionaire, Kalisankar Palit. He was brought up in Amarpur in Hooghly district, West Bengal.

== Education ==
Taraknath graduated from college at the Hindu School, Kolkata and then he studied law in England. During his stay in England, he came in contact with the first Assamese graduate and civilian Anundoram Borooah.

== Career ==
In 1871, Taraknath returned to India and established a legal practice.

== Philanthropy ==
Taraknath Palit was instrumental in the founding of the National Council of Education (NCE) of India, "a stout supporter of nationalism and national development and attempted to nationalize education." He was one of the main figures behind the foundation of Bengal Technical Institute at the height of Swadeshi Movement, along with Maharaja Manindra Chandra Nandy, Bhupendra Nath Bose, Nilratan Sircar and Rashbihari Ghosh. It was established on 25 July 1906 and was the direct predecessor of Jadavpur University.

In June and October 1912, he executed two trust deeds for Calcutta University, donating Rs 1.5 million. (Note: The law department building is now on the land donated by Taraknath Palit.) His donations helped fund the 27 March 1914 creation of the University College of Science and Technology. (Note: Along with Sir Rashbihari Ghosh, their cumulitive donation of nearly thirty seven and half lakhs of rupees formed the corpus for the creation of University College of Science and Technology also known as the Rajabazar Science College campus of Calcutta University. It is presently located at "Rashbehari Siksha Prangan" at 92, Acharya Prafulla Chandra Road, Kolkata and "Taraknath Palit Siksha Prangan" at 35, Ballygunge Circular Road, Kolkata.)

He was knighted by the British Government on 1 January 1913.

== Death ==
He died on 3 October 1914.
