= Vernacular Press Act, 1878 =

1878 language law in British India

Native Press Act, 1878

Imperial Legislative Council

Repealed by
- Seditious Publications Act, 1882
- Status: Repealed

In British India, the Vernacular Press Act, 1878, modelled on the Irish press laws, was enacted to curtail the freedom of the Indian press and prevent the expression of criticism toward British policies—notably, the opposition that had grown with the outset of the Second Anglo-Afghan War (1878–80). There was also strong public opinion against Lytton's policies such as organizing Delhi Durbar (1877) when India was facing severe famine. The government adopted the Vernacular Press Act, 1878 to regulate the indigenous press in order to manage strong public opinion and seditious writing producing unhappiness among the people of native region with the government.

The act was proposed by Lytton, then Viceroy of India, and was unanimously passed by the Viceroy's Council on 14 March 1878. The act excluded English-language publications as it was meant to control seditious writing in 'publications in Oriental languages' everywhere in the country, except for the South. Thus the British totally discriminated against the (non-English language) Indian press.

== Provisions ==
The act empowered the government to impose restrictions on the press in the following ways:

1. Modelled on the Irish press act, this act provided the government with extensive rights to censor reports and editorials in the vernacular press.
2. From now on the government kept regular track of Vernacular newspapers.
3. When a report published in the newspaper was judged as seditious, the newspaper was warned.
4. The district magistrate was empowered to call upon the printer and publisher of any vernacular newspaper to enter into a bond with the government undertaking not to cause disaffection against the government or antipathy between persons of different religions, caste, and race. However, later this precensorship power was opposed, and a press commissioner was appointed by the government to supply authentic and accurate news to the press.
5. The magistrate’s action was final, and no appeal could be made in a court of law.
6. There could be exemptions from the operation of the act by submitting proofs to a government censor.
7. Printers and publishers might also be mandated to provide a security deposit. This deposit could be forfeited if they violated the rules. Furthermore, if the violation happened again, their printing equipment could be confiscated.

The revolt of 1857 forced the government to curb the freedom of the press.After the revolt enraged English men demanded a clamp down on the press. As vernacular newspaper became assertively nationalist,colonial government began debating measures of strict control

== Reception ==
Because the British government was in a hurry to pass the bill without encouraging any reactions whatever, the bill was not published in the usual papers in Calcutta and the North-Western Provinces were the slowest in obtaining information. While the Amrita Bazar Patrika in Calcutta had converted itself into an all-English weekly within a week of the passing of the Vernacular Press Act, papers in the north were wondering what the exact provisions of the act were, even after two weeks of its existence. The following years saw the appearance and disappearance of a number of Bengali journals in quick succession, failing to gain support with their poverty of language and thought.

Once publishers learned of the provisions, the repressive measure encountered strong opposition. All the native associations irrespective of religion, caste and creed denounced the measure and kept their protests alive. All the prominent leaders as Bengal and India condemned the Act as unwarranted and unjustified, and demanded its immediate withdrawal. The newspapers themselves kept criticizing the measure without end. The succeeding administration of Lord Ripon reviewed the developments consequent upon the Act and finally withdrew it (1881). However, the resentment it produced among Indians helped fuel India's growing independence movement. The Indian Association, which is generally considered to be one of the precursors of the Indian National Congress, was one of the Act's biggest critics. The crucial demand for a judicial trial in case of an accusation of sedition against an editor was never conceded by the government. However, in October 1878 the act was modified in minor respect; the submission of proofs before publication was no longer insisted upon, although the bail-bond remained.

The Act came to be nicknamed “The Gagging Act”. Proceedings were instituted against Som Prakash, Bharat Mihir, Dacca Prakash and Samachar till its repeal by Ripon.
