= Nisith Ranjan Ray =

Indian historian

- Born: 19 November 1910; Ishwarganj, Bengal Presidency, British India
- Died: 7 September 1994 (aged 83); Calcutta, West Bengal, India
- Occupation: Historian
- Known for: Indian history
- Awards: Rabindra Puraskar(1988; Padma Shri(1992)

Nisith Ranjan Ray(19 November 1910 – 7 September 1994) was an Indian historian, social activist and the founder of the Society for Preservation, Calcutta, an organisation working for the preservation of the cultural heritage of Kolkata.

Born in Mymensingh District of the present-day Bangladesh in 1910, Ray taught History at Calcutta University before joining the Victoria Memorial Hall in 1971 as its secretary and curator. He was one of the founder members of the Paschimbanga Bangla Akademi, the apex body for Bengali language in West Bengal and the director of the Institute of Historical Studies, Kolkata. He was the author of several books on history, including Bengal: Yesterday and Today, Calcutta: the Profile of a City, India and Her People: Bengal, A History of India and Concise history of the Indian National Congress, 1885-1947

The Government of India awarded him its fourth-highest civilian honour, the Padma Shri, in 1992. A year of celebrations for the centenary of his birth was opened in November 2009 by the historians P. T. Nair and Amalendu De.

== Selected bibliography ==
- Ray Nisith; Roy Ranjit (1998). Bengal: Yesterday and Today. Papyrus Publishing House. p. 132. ISBN 978-8171750092.
- Nisith Ranjan Ray (1986). Calcutta: the Profile of a City. K. P. Bagchi & Co. ASIN B016TVSWQM.
- Nisith R. Ray (1979). India and Her People: Bengal. Sangam Books. p. 118. ISBN 978-0861311101.
- Narendra Krishna Sinha; Nisith Ranjan Ray (1973). A history of India. Orient Longman. p. 613.
- Nisith Ranjan Ray; Ravindrer Kumar; Manmath Nath Das (1985). Concise history of the Indian National Congress, 1885-1947. Vikas Publishing House. p. 322. ISBN 9780706930207.

== See also ==
- Paschimbanga Bangla Akademi
