= Digambar Mitra =

First Bengali Sheriff of Kolkata, India

Raja Digambar Mitra রাজা দিগম্বর মিত্র
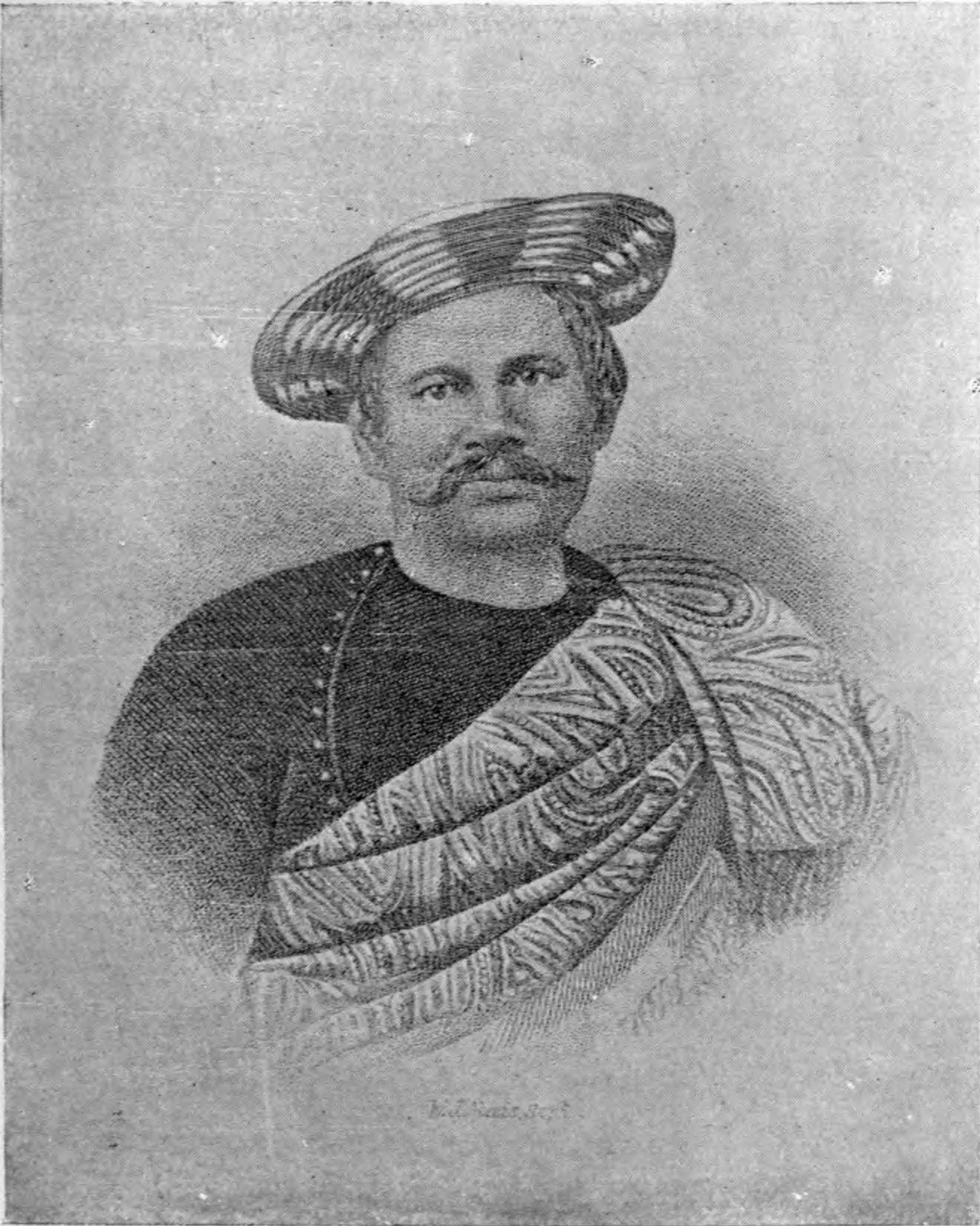
- Born: 1817; Konnagar, Hooghly district, Bengal Presidency, British India
- Died: 20 April 1879 (aged 62); Calcutta, Bengal Presidency, British India
- Occupations: Teacher, financier, evangelist

Raja Digambar Mitra (1817–1879) was an Indian businessman. He was one of the leading Derozians and the first Bengali Sheriff of Kolkata.

== Birth and Ancestry ==
Babu Digambar Mitra, later known as Raja Digambar Mitra, was born in 1817 at Konnagar in the district of Hooghly of present-day West Bengal into a Kulin Kayastha family.

This wealthy and respectable family of Konnagar was locally known as the Mandir-Bati-Mitra family. Raja Digambar Mitra's grandfather Ram Chandra Mitra was a cashier in a Calcutta based mercantile firm. He had three sons namely Shib Chandra Mitra, Shambhu Chandra Mitra and Raj Krishna Mitra, Shib Chandra being the eldest among all of the three. All of them were employed in the same firm as their father. Shib Chandra Mitra had two sons. His eldest son was Raja Digambar Mitra. In the later years, Shib Chandra bought a house in Sovabazar, North Calcutta. Raja Digambar Mitra spend his childhood at Calcutta.

== Life ==
The son of Shib Chandra Mitra of Konnagar in Hooghly district of present-day West Bengal, he was educated at Hare School and Hindu College and was one of the leading disciples of Henry Louis Vivian Derozio.

After finishing his education in 1834, he shifted to Murshidabad to work as a teacher. After leaving that job, he worked as head clerk under the District Magistrate and Collector of Rajshahi. Unhappy with his job, he returned to Murshidabad and worked as a tehsildar for the East India Company. In 1838, he was appointed as the estate manager of Cossimbazar Raj. As manager of the Cossimbazar Raj, he was awarded one lakh rupees for his innovative efforts by Raja Krishnanath of Cossimbazar. He invested the money in cotton, indigo business, and share market which made him rich and he became a zamindar.

An orthodox person he opposed the introduction of widow remarriage.

He was awarded CSI in 1876 and made Raja in 1877.

One of his grandsons was the illustrious Kumar Manmatha Nath Mitra Rai Bahadur of Shyampukur, well known for his extensive knowledge of European fine art and precious gemstones, and the trading in these items. Shyampukur Rajbati once housed the largest Bohemian crystal chandelier in Calcutta.
