= Sisir Kumar Ghosh =

Indian journalist

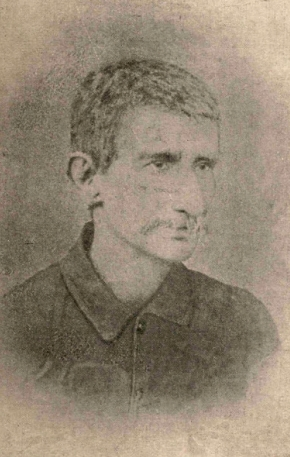
- Born: 1840; Palua, Bengal Presidency, British India
- Died: 10 January 1911 (aged 70–71); Calcutta, Bengal Presidency, British India
- Education: Hare School, Presidency College, Calcutta University
- Occupations: Journalist, Freedom fighter, playwright, biographers
- Known for: Founders of Amrita Bazar Patrika
- Movement: Indian Independence Movement

Sisir Kumar Ghosh (1840–1911), also spelled Shishir Kumar Ghose, was an Indian journalist, founder of the Amrita Bazar Patrika, a Bengali language newspaper, in 1868, and an independence activist from Bengal.

He started the India League in 1875 intending to stimulate the sense of nationalism amongst the people. He was also a Vaishnavite, remembered for writings on mystic saint Chaitanya Mahaprabhu (Gauranga), and for penning a book on him titled Lord Gauranga or Salvation for All in 1897. He also writes several biographies for example: Narottam Charit. He was one of the first batch of students who passed the first entrance examination of Calcutta University in 1857.
