= Rasik Krishna Mallick =

Indian journalist and reformer (1810–1858)

- Born: 1810; Calcutta, Bengal Presidency, British India
- Died: 1858 (aged 47–48); Calcutta, Bengal Presidency, British India
- Occupation: Journalist

Rasik Krishna Mallick (1810 – 8 January 1858) was an Indian journalist, editor, reformer, educationist and a leading member of Young Bengal group. He had shocked the court in British India in the 1820s with the statement that he did not believe in the sacredness of the Ganges.

== Early life ==
He was born in 1810 at Sinduriapatti in Kolkata. He was the son of Naba Kishore Mallick. His father worked in thread trading and was linked to the Seths, who were the original residents of Govindapur. The family had standing in society.

After initial education at home with some grounding in English, Mallick enrolled at Hindu College. He was greatly influenced by Raja Rammohun Roy, who was then active in Kolkata. In 1828, Derozio joined Hindu College, Mallick became one of his disciples.

As a student, he appeared as witness in a case in the supreme court at Kolkata. In those days, the system was that Hindu witnesses had to swear an oath while touching a copper vessel containing Ganges water and tulsi (holy basil) leaf. An Oriya Brahmin brought these items to every witness. Mallick refused to comply with this process. His Bengali statement was translated in court as, "I do not believe in the sacredness of the Ganges".

His family drugged him and wanted to take him forcibly to Varanasi for penance and reformation. However, Mallick recovered and ran away. His family banned him from the house. He worked in Hare School for some time. When Indians were allowed for the first time to be appointed or promoted as deputy collectors Mallick became employed and was posted to Bardhaman.

While residing in Barhaman, he joined forces with his friend, Ramtanu Lahiri, also stationed there, to reject orthodox traditions. Together, they cast off their sacred threads, symbolizing their rejection of rigid caste customs.

== Achievements ==
He was editor of the magazine Jnananwesan and was one of the sponsors of Parthenon, the first English magazine to be edited and published by Indians in 1830.

He was actively involved in the social reforms launched by Suhrid Samiti founed by of Kishori Chand Mitra, brother of his friend Peary Chand Mitra. In 1831, he established a free Hindu school for the spread of education. He also tried to spread education though Calcutta Public Library of Rasamay Dutta. He advocated the use of Bengali as the medium of education without ignoring English. He was partly successful in a campaign to replace Persian in courts by Bengali.

Citing specific examples of political thinking by Derozians, Nitish Sengupta wrote, "In 1833 Rasik-Krishna Mallik criticised police corruption, attributed the lack of protection of the peasantry to the Permanent Settlement, and advocated the abolition of the political power of the merchant company".

Hhe died of illness on 8 January 1858.
