= Drinkwater Bethune =

Drinkwater Bethune may refer:

- John Drinkwater Bethune (1762–1844), English officer and military historian
- John Elliot Drinkwater Bethune (1801–1851), his son, English barrister and pioneer in women's education in India
