= Ramtanu Lahiri O Tatkalin Bangasamaj =

The Life and Times of Ramtanu Lahiri
- Author: Sivanath Sastri
- Publisher: in Calcutta
- Publication date: 1903
- Publication place: Bengali
- English publication date: 1907
- Media type: Print (hardcover)

Ramtanu Lahiri O Tatkalin Bangasamaj (Ramtanu Lahiri and Contemporary Bengali Society/The Life and Times of Ramtanu Lahiri) is a book authored by Sivanath Sastri. It is considered one of the most important historical documents relating to the period commonly known as the Bengali Renaissance; in particular, it is the primary source of information on the Brahmo Samaj. Though named after the social reformer Ramtanu Lahiri, it covers a broad historical period beginning with Ram Mohan Roy and including the Brahmos, Henry Louis Vivian Derozio and his Young Bengal movement and other such important historical events of contemporary Bengali society. A translation into English by Mr. Lahiri's son, Sharat Kumar Lahiri, was published in London in 1907.
