= Hara Chandra Ghosh =

Indian social reformer (1808–1868)

- Born: 23 July 1808; Sarsuna, 24 Parganas, Bengal Presidency, Company Raj
- Died: 3 December 1868 (aged 60); Calcutta, Bengal Presidency, British India
- Occupation: Judge

Rai Bahadur Hara Chandra Ghosh (archaic Hurro Chunder Ghose) was one of the prominent leaders of the Young Bengal group (a group of radical Bengali free thinkers emerging from Hindu College, Calcutta of British India in the early 19th century). He was the first Bengali to be a judge of the Calcutta Small Causes Court from 1854 to 1868. H.E.A. Cotton says, "In his youth, he was a favourite pupil, as the Rev. K.M.Banerjee had been of David Hare and Derozio: but unlike others he maintained his Hinduism." He earned fame as a judge and was not involved in religion and social reform.

== Formative years ==
The family of Hara Chandra Ghosh hailed from Sarsuna in South 24 Parganas. His father was Abhay Charan Ghosh. His grandfather Sitanath Ghosh was a close friend of Babu Pran Krishna Singha, a famous zamindar of Calcutta and granduncle of Kaliprasanna Singha. In those days, it was a custom to learn Persian, but Ghosh was not satisfied with learning Persian only. He was keen to learn English also. As a result of his own efforts, he joined the newly founded Hindu College and later became a favourite student of Derozio. He was one of the students actively involved in the Academic Association, where he used to deliver speeches.

== Career ==
As a youngster, he attracted attention of Lord William Bentinck, who wanted to appoint him on his personal staff and take Ghosh with him but the latter could not accept the offer because of opposition from his mother. However, in 1832, when the position of munsif was created for the Indians, Bentinck appointed him munsif of Bankura. Within a few days of his arrival in Bankura the situation started changing. The court started working from ten to five. When there was shortage of staff, Ghosh himself took down notes and wrote out judgments. His honesty and devotion enhanced the respect for the judiciary in the eyes of the public.

After successfully working in Bankura for six years, he was transferred to Hooghly in 1838, and in 1844, he became principal sadar amin of 24 Parganas. After serving for twenty years as a member of the subordinate Civil Judiciary in Bengal, he was gazetted as junior police magistrate of Kolkata (then known as Calcutta) in 1852, on the unanimous recommendation of the judges of the Sadar Diwani Adalat. In 1854, he was transferred to the Small Causes Court, where he remained till his death.

He was associated with John Elliot Drinkwater Bethune in the formation of the Bethune School and was a member of the school committee. He joined the other Derozians for the construction of a memorial statue for David Hare.

He became the legal guardian of Kaliprasanna Singha, the son of his neighbour Nandalal Singha of Jorasanko after the later's untimely death. He stood with the family through thick and thin, and assisted Kaliprasanna's mother in legal cases against relatives. He was also a trusted advisor of the Kaliprasanna.

== Honours ==
He enjoyed the confidence of Lord William Bentinck, Lord Auckland and Lord Dalhousie. He was made a Rai Bahadur (a title of honor issued in British India to individuals who have performed a deed of great service to the nation).

A memorial meeting was held in the Town Hall, on 4 January 1869, where Chief Justice Norman, mentioned Ghosh as 'the very model of what a native gentleman should be.' A marble bust of Hara Chandra Ghosh was unveiled in the main entrance to the Small Causes Court by Sir Arthur Macpherson, then a judge of Calcutta High Court on 8 March 1876.
