= Radhanath Sikdar =

Indian mathematician (1813–1870)

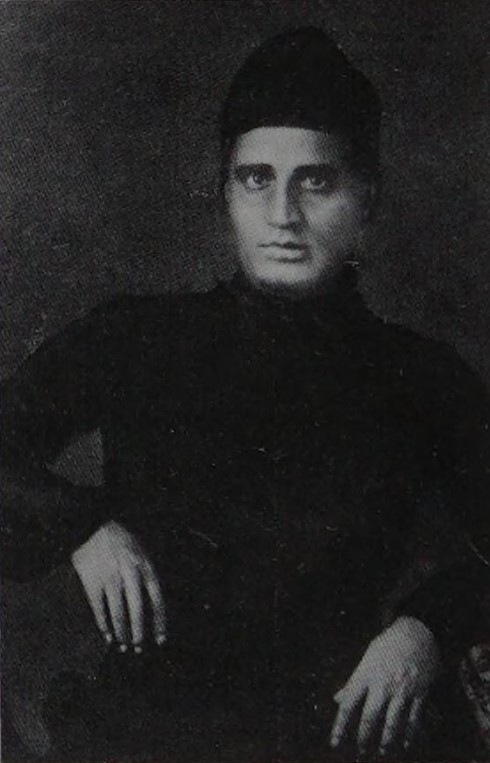
- Radhanath Sikdar
- Born: 5 October 1813; Jorasanko, Calcutta, Bengal Presidency
- Died: 17 May 1870 (aged 56); Chandernagore, French India
- Education: Presidency College (BA)
- Father: Tituram Sikdar
- Relatives: Srinath Sikdar (brother)

Radhanath Sikdar (Bengali: রাধানাথ শিকদার; 5 October 1813 – 17 May 1870) was an Indian mathematician and social reformer. He is best known for being the first person to calculate the height of Mount Everest, in 1852. He was a member of Henry Derozio's Young Bengal group. In 1854, along with fellow Derozian Peary Chand Mitra, Sikdar founded Masik Patrika, a Bengali journal for the education of the Indian women.

== Early life ==
Sikdar was born on 5 October 1813, into a Bengali Brahmin family in Calcutta to Tituram Sikdar and Deviki Sikdar. His father worked as a clerk. He had a brother named Srinath Sikdar. Demonstrating exceptional mathematical ability from an early age, Radhanath's talent soon drew the attention of John Tytler, then Professor of Mathematics at Hindu College (now Presidency University). Recognizing his promise, Tytler provided him with invaluable mentorship and academic support, which played a formative role in Sikdar's intellectual development.

== Great Trigonometric Survey ==
In 1831, George Everest, the Surveyor General of India, was in the pursuit of a mathematician who had specialised in spherical trigonometry, so that they could be a part of the Great Trigonometric Survey. In 1832, under the leadership of Everest, the longitudinal series of the "triangle" survey was completed from Sironj in Central India to Calcutta in Bengal.

While still working on mapping Calcutta, Bengal, Everest had begun his search for a mathematician, and soon enough, John Tytler, a professor of Mathematics at the Hindu College, now known as the Presidency College, recommended his 18-year-old pupil, Radhanath Sikdar.

Radhanath, a student of the college since 1824, was one of the first two Indians to read Isaac Newton's Principia and by 1832; he had studied Euclid's Elements, Thomas Jephson's Fluxion and Analytical Geometry and Astronomy by Windhouse. Taking inspiration from these prestigious papers, he devised a new method to draw a common tangent to two circles, when he was just a teenager. There was little doubt about Radhanath's proficiency in his subject, and he secured the job at the GTS on 19 December 1831 as a "computer" at a salary of thirty rupees per month.

Soon he was sent to Sironj near Dehradun. Even as seven other Bengali 'computers' worked alongside him, Radhanath soon showed his superior skills in mathematics and became Everest's favourite colleague. So much so, that he once stopped his transfer to another department. Radhanath's job was to carry geodetic surveys—the study of the earth's geometric shape orientation in space and gravitational field. He did not just use the established methods but invented his own to accurately measure these factors.

George Everest retired in 1843 and was succeeded by Colonel Andrew Scott Waugh. Eight years later, in 1851, Radhanath was promoted to the position of Chief Computer and transferred to Calcutta. Here, he was also a superintendent for the Meteorological Department.

At the order of Colonel Waugh, Radhanath started measuring the height of mountains. The brilliant mathematician, who had perhaps never seen Mount Everest, discovered in 1852 that Kangchenjunga, which was considered to be the tallest in the world, wasn't really so. Compiling data about Mount Everest from six observations, he eventually came to the conclusion that it was the tallest in the world.

It was during the computations of the northeastern observations that Radhanath had calculated the height of Peak XV at exactly 29,000 ft (8839 m), but Waugh added an arbitrary two feet because he was afraid that the Sikdar's figure would be considered a rounded number rather than an accurate one. He officially announced this finding in March 1856, and this remained the height of Mount Everest till an Indian survey re-calculated it to be 29,029 ft or 8848 m in 1955.

Technological advancements, data from the thousands of climbers, and the discovery of different routes to the summit all have led to a more accurate calculation of the height of Mount Everest—a peak that grows at the rate of 4 mm every year and whose summit is slowly moving northeastwards each passing year.

== Others ==
It appears that while Everest and Waugh both extolled him for his exceptional mathematical abilities, his relations with the colonial administration were far from cordial. Two specific instances are on record.

In 1851 a Survey Manual (eds. Capt. H. L. Thullier and Capt. F. Smyth) was published by the Survey Department. The preface to the Manual mentions that the more technical and mathematical chapters of the Manual were written by Babu Radhanath Sikdar. The Manual proved to be immensely useful to surveyors. However, the third edition, published in 1875 (i.e., after Sikdar's death) did not contain that preface, so that Sikdar's memorable contribution was de-recognized. The incident was condemned by a section of British surveyors. The paper Friend of India in 1876 called it 'robbery of the dead'.

It is also on record that Sikdar was fined a sum of 200 rupees in 1843 for having vehemently protested against the unlawful exploitation of survey department workers by the Magistrate Vansittart. The incident was reported in detail in The Bengal Spectator edited by Ramgopal Ghosh.

In 1854, Sikdar along with his Derozian friend Peary Chand Mitra started the Bengali journal Masik Patrika, for education and empowerment of women. He used to write in a simple and uncluttered style that was rather atypical for the age.

Sikdar had retired from service in 1862, and was later appointed as teacher of mathematics at the General Assembly's Institution (now Scottish Church College).

== Death ==
Sikdar died on 17 May 1870 at Chandernagore and was interred at the Sacred Heart French Cemetery.

== Recognition ==
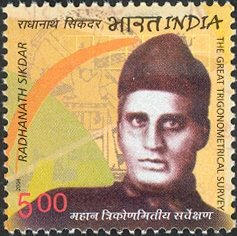
The Great Trigonometrical Survey - Radhanath Sikdar Stamp of India - 2004

In recognition of Sikdar's mathematical genius, German Philosophical Society's Bavaria branch of Natural Science made Radhanath Sikdar a Corresponding Member in 1864, two years after his retirement.

The Department of Posts, Government of India, launched a postal stamp on 27 June 2004, commemorating the establishment of the Great Trigonometric Survey in Chennai, India on 10 April 1802. The stamps feature Radhanath Sikdar and Nain Singh, two significant contributors to society.

== Notes ==
- Bagal, Jogesh Chandra Unabingsha Shatabdir Bangla, 1941
- Chaudhury, Ajana A Brief Historical Review of Early Weather Work in Kolkata, Psyche and Society, Kolkata, May 2009
- Lahiri, Ashish Radhanath Sikdar and Colonial Science, Sahitya Samsad, Kolkata, 2017
- Nath, Sankar Kumar Radhanath Sikdar: Taththeyer Aaloye, Chirayata, Kolkata-73, October 2012
