= Charles Bethune =

Royal Navy Admiral (1802–1884)

Admiral Charles Bethune CB
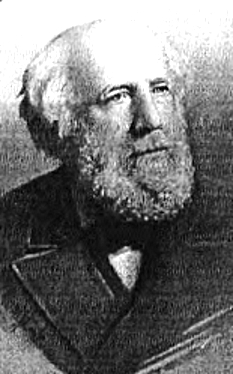
- Born: Charles Ramsay Drinkwater Bethune; 27 December 1802; Little Ealing, Middlesex
- Died: 14 February 1884 (aged 81); Queensberry Place, South Kensington
- Burial place: Brompton Cemetery, London
- Military career
- Allegiance: United Kingdom
- Branch: Royal Navy
- Service years: 1815–1870
- Rank: Admiral
- Commands: HMS Conway
- Conflicts: First Opium War
- Awards: Companion of the Bath

Admiral Charles Ramsay Drinkwater Bethune CB (27 December 1802 – 14 February 1884) was a British officer of the Royal Navy. He rose to the rank of Admiral during his career.

== Early life ==
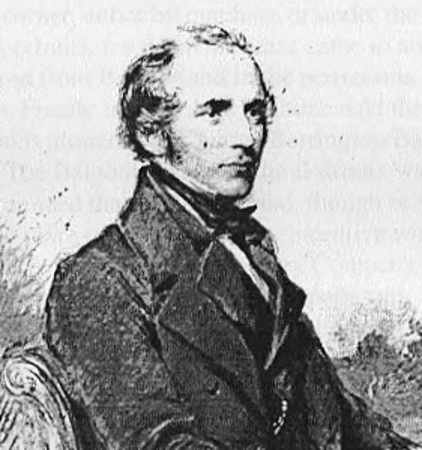
Charles Bethune when young

Born 27 Decemnber 1802 at Little Ealing, Middlesex, the son of Colonel John Drinkwater and Eleanor Congalton, he assumed the name of Bethune in 1837, when his mother inherited the estates of her brother, George Congalton-Bethune.

== Naval career ==
Bethune served with the Royal Navy from the age of 13, joining his first ship HMS Northumberland in 1815. Serving under Captain Charles Ross he escorted Napoleon to exile on Saint Helena. He then served on HMS Leander, HMS Superb and HMS Creole. On 24 March 1822 he passed his exam for Lieutenant and then served in that rank on HMS Doris. He then served on several ships and on 22 July 1830, he was promoted Captain. He commanded HMS Conway in Australasia and the Far East from 1836 to 1842. He reported the Conway Reef in 1838.

He served in the First Opium War operating on the Chinese coast. In June 1840 he commanded a serious of transports to the Chinese coast. On 5 July 1840 he commanded a shore party which was involved in the Capture of Chusan. His ship was then engaged in the blockade of Ningpo before being assigned to survey work. He was appointed a Companion of the Bath in 1841 for his services.

In 1845, he was sent to Borneo by the Admiralty to report on the best location for a British base against piracy. In the course of this mission he painted a number of watercolour views in Sarawak which were published in 1847 in James Augustus St. John's Views in the Eastern Archipelago.

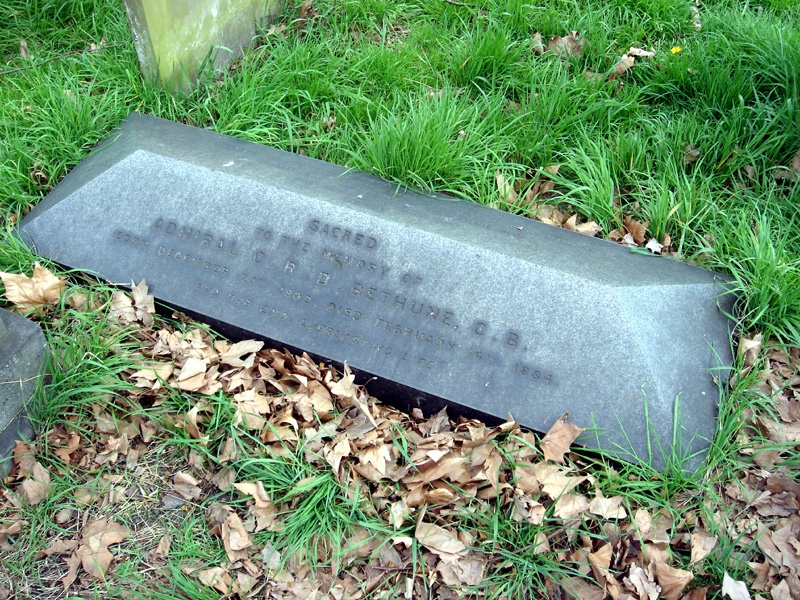
Funerary monument, Brompton Cemetery, London

In 1846 he joined the Council of the newly formed Hakluyt Society, for which he subsequently edited two volumes. The first edited volume, written by Sir John Hawkins, was published in 1847. The second edited volume, written by Antonio Galvano, was published in 1862. In 1851, on the death in India of his elder brother John Elliot Drinkwater Bethune, he became 24th Laird of Balfour, part of Clan Bethune in Fife. He also served as a Justice of the Peace and Deputy Lieutenant for Fife.

He was promoted to rear admiral on 3 October 1855. On 10 November 1862, he was promoted to vice admiral. He was promoted Admiral 2 April 1866. By 1877, he was on the retired list of admirals on half pay.

He died in 1884. He is buried in Brompton Cemetery, London.

== Family ==
In 1846, he had married Frances Cecilia (1819–1888), only child of Henry Edward Staples, and they had six children. His eldest son was Charles Congalton. Of his other sons, #2 Edward Cecil Bethune (1855–1930) became a Lieutenant-General in the British Army, #2 Henry Leonard Drinkwater Bethune (1858–1939) became a captain in the Royal Navy, and #3 Francis John Brownlow Bethune (1860–1954) became a King's Counsel in Australia. His eldest daughter, Mary Frances Drinkwater Bethune (1847–1929), in 1867 married John George Frederick Hope-Wallace (1839–1900), son of the Honourable James Hope and his wife Lady Mary Frances Nugent. Mary Frances Drinkwater Bethune had seven children.
