= High-pressure area =

Region with higher atmospheric pressure

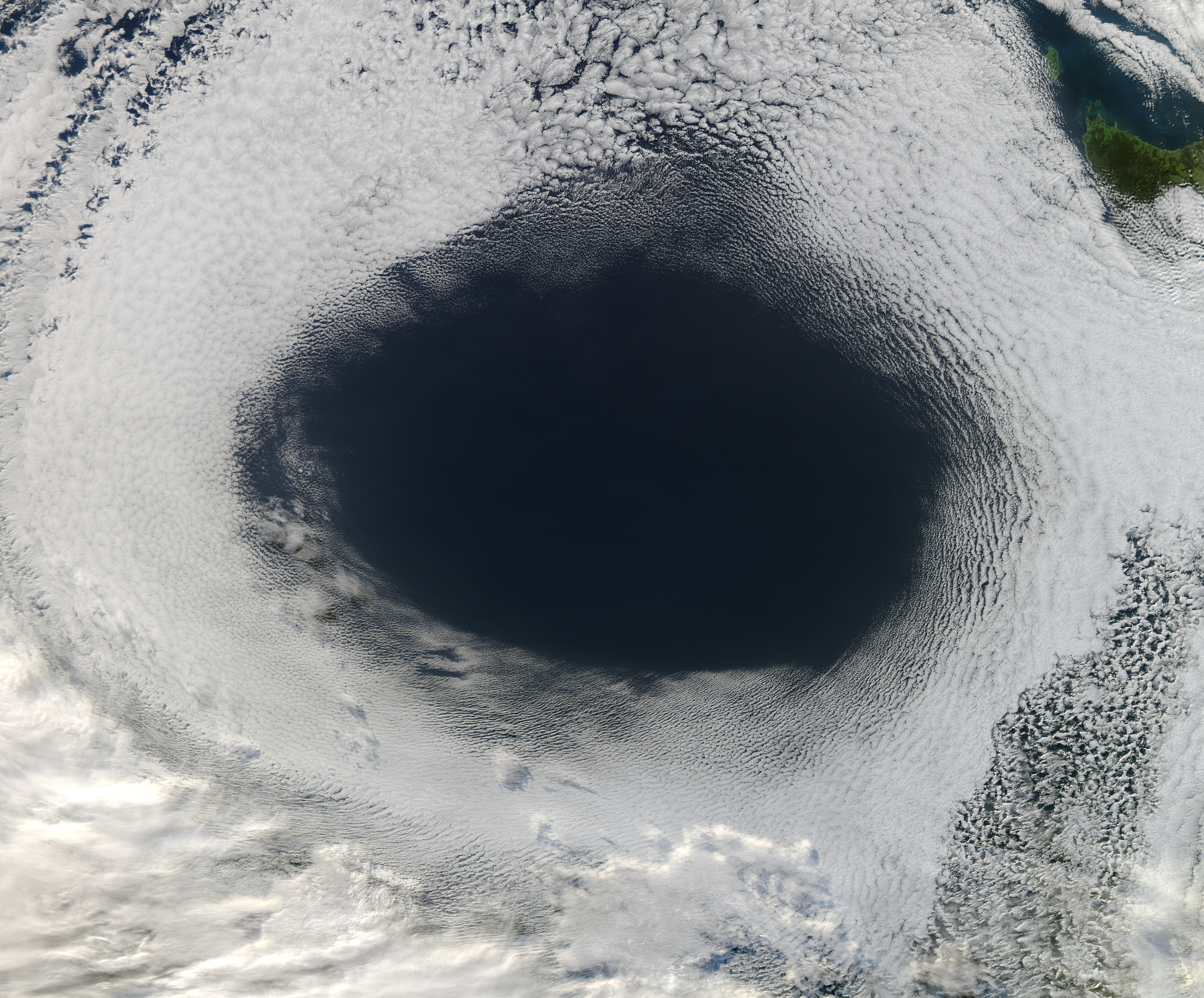
Satellite image showing a high-pressure area south of Australia, evidenced by the clearing in the clouds

A high-pressure air system, high, or anticyclone, is an area near the surface of a planet where the atmospheric pressure is greater than the pressure in the surrounding regions. Highs are middle-scale meteorological features that result from interplays between the relatively larger-scale dynamics of an entire planet's atmospheric circulation.

The strongest high-pressure areas result from masses of cold air which spread out from polar regions into cool neighboring regions. These highs weaken once they extend out over warmer bodies of water.

Weaker—but more frequently occurring—are high-pressure areas caused by atmospheric subsidence: Air becomes cool enough to precipitate out its water vapor, and large masses of cooler, drier air descend from above.

Within high-pressure areas, winds flow from where the pressure is highest, at the center of the area, towards the periphery where the pressure is lower. However, the direction is not straight from the center outwards, but curved due to the Coriolis effect from Earth's rotation. Viewed from above, the wind direction is bent in the direction opposite to the planet's rotation.

On English-language weather maps, high-pressure centers are identified by the letter H.

== Wind circulation in the Northern and Southern hemispheres ==
The direction of wind flow around an atmospheric high-pressure area, as seen from above, depends on the hemisphere. High-pressure systems rotate clockwise in the Northern Hemisphere and counterclockwise in the Southern Hemisphere. A simple rule is that for high-pressure areas, where generally air flows from the center outward, the coriolis force given by the earth's rotation to the air circulation is in the opposite direction of earth's apparent rotation if viewed from above the hemisphere's pole. These results derive from the Coriolis effect.

High pressure systems in the temperate latitudes generally bring warm weather in summer, when the amount of heat received from the Sun during daytime exceeds what is lost at night, and cold weather in winter when the amount of heat lost at night exceeds what is gained during daytime.

In the Southern Hemisphere the result is similar. Australia and the southern cone of South America get hot, dry summer weather from the subtropical ridge and cooler wetter winter weather as cold fronts from the southern oceans take over.

The term cyclone was coined by Henry Piddington of the British East India Company to describe the devastating storm of December 1789 in Coringa, India. A cyclone forms around a low-pressure area. Anticyclone, the term for the kind of weather around a high-pressure area, was coined in 1877 by Francis Galton.

== Formation ==
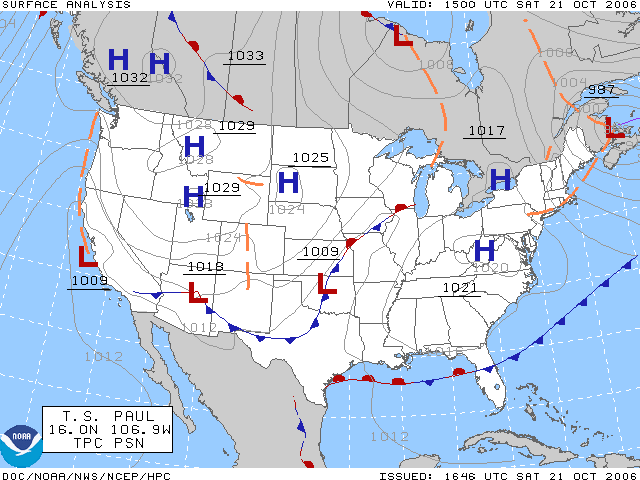
A surface weather analysis for the United States 21 October 2006. High pressure areas are labeled "H".

High-pressure areas form due to downward motion through the troposphere, the atmospheric layer where weather occurs. Preferred areas within a synoptic flow pattern in higher levels of the troposphere are beneath the western side of troughs. On weather maps, these areas show converging winds (isotachs), also known as convergence, near or above the level of non-divergence, which is near the 500 hPa pressure surface about midway up through the troposphere, and about half the atmospheric pressure at the surface.

High pressure systems are also called anticyclones. On English-language weather maps, high-pressure centers are identified by the letter H, within the isobar with the highest pressure value. On constant pressure upper level charts, it is located within the highest height line contour.

== Typical conditions ==
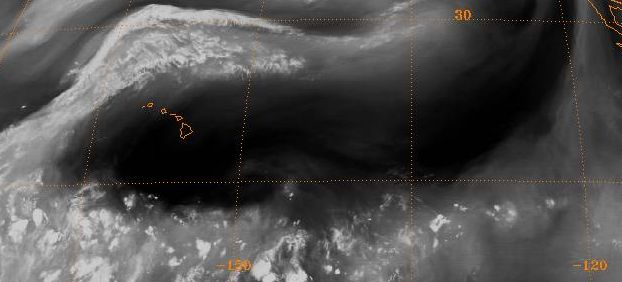
The subtropical ridge shows up as a large area of black (dryness) on this water vapor satellite image from September 2000.

Highs are frequently associated with light winds at the surface and subsidence through the lower portion of the troposphere. In general, subsidence will dry out an air mass by adiabatic, or compressional, heating. Thus, high pressure typically brings clear skies. During the day, since no clouds are present to reflect sunlight, there is more incoming shortwave solar radiation, and temperatures rise. At night, the absence of clouds means that outgoing longwave radiation (i.e. heat energy from the surface) is not absorbed, giving cooler diurnal low temperatures in all seasons. When surface winds become light, subsidence directly beneath a high-pressure system can cause a buildup of particulates in urban areas beneath the ridge, leading to widespread haze. If the low level relative humidity rises towards 100 percent overnight, fog can form.

Strong, vertically shallow, high-pressure systems moving from higher to lower latitudes in the northern hemisphere are associated with continental Arctic air masses. Once arctic air moves over an unfrozen ocean, the air mass modifies greatly over the warmer water and takes on the character of a maritime air mass, which reduces the strength of the high-pressure system. When extremely cold air moves over relatively warm oceans, polar lows can develop. However, warm and moist (or maritime tropical) air masses that move poleward from tropical sources are slower to modify than arctic air masses.

== In climatology ==
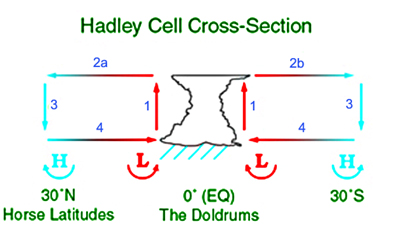
The Hadley cell carries heat and moisture from the tropics towards the northern and southern mid-latitudes. It deposits drier air, contributing to the world's great deserts.

The horse latitudes, or torrid zones, are roughly at the 30th parallel and are the source of warm high pressure systems. As the hot air closer to the equator rises, it cools, losing moisture; it is then transported poleward where it descends, creating the high-pressure area. This is part of the Hadley cell circulation and is known as the subtropical ridge or subtropical high. It follows the track of the sun over the year, expanding north (south in the Southern Hemisphere) in spring and retreating south (north in the Southern Hemisphere) in fall. The subtropical ridge is a warm core high-pressure system, meaning it strengthens with height. Many of the world's deserts are caused by these climatological high-pressure systems.

Some climatological high-pressure areas acquire regionally based names. The land-based Siberian High often remains quasi-stationary for more than a month during the most frigid time of the year, making it unique in that regard. It is also a bit larger and more persistent than its counterpart in North America. Near the center, anticyclonic rotation is replaced by katabatic winds, but the system causes intense northerly winds over the pacific coast, generating a winter monsoon. Arctic high-pressure systems such as the Siberian High are cold core, meaning that they weaken with height. The influence of the Azores High, also known as the Bermuda High, brings fair weather over much of the North Atlantic Ocean and mid to late summer heat waves in western Europe. Along its southerly periphery, the clockwise circulation often impels easterly waves, and tropical cyclones that develop from them, across the ocean towards landmasses in the western portion of ocean basins during the hurricane season. The highest barometric pressure ever recorded on Earth was 1,085.7 hectopascals (32.06 inHg) measured in Tosontsengel, Zavkhan, Mongolia on 19 December 2001.

A particularly hot summer such as 2003 which saw the subtropical ridge expand more than usual can bring heat waves as far north as Scandinavia—conversely, while Europe had record-breaking summer heat in 2003 due to a particularly strong subtropical ridge, its counterpart in North America was unusually weak, and temperatures across the continent that spring and summer were wet and well below normal.

== Connection to wind ==
Atmospheric air flows from areas of high pressure to areas of low pressure resulting in wind. Since stronger high-pressure systems contain cooler or drier air, the air mass is more dense and flows towards areas that are warm or moist where air is less dense and atmospheric pressure at the surface is lower. The larger the pressure difference between a high-pressure system and a low-pressure system, the higher the wind speed. The coriolis force caused by the Earth's rotation is what gives winds within high-pressure systems their clockwise circulation in the northern hemisphere (as the wind moves outward and is deflected right from the center of high pressure) and counterclockwise circulation in the southern hemisphere (as the wind moves outward and is deflected left from the center of high pressure). Friction with land slows down the wind flowing out of high-pressure systems and causes wind to flow more outward than would be the case in the absence of friction. This results in the 'actual wind' or 'true wind', including ageostrophic corrections, which add to the geostrophic wind that is characterized by flow parallel to the isobars.

== See also ==
- Anticyclonic storm – Type of storm
- Anticyclonic tornado – Tornadoes that spin in the opposite direction of normal tornadoes
- Barometric ridge – Elongated region of high atmospheric pressure
- Heat dome – Weather phenomenon
- Trade winds – Equatorial east-to-west prevailing winds
- Weather front – Boundary separating two masses of air of different densities
