= The Fakeer of Jungheera =

1829 English poem by Derozio

The Fakeer of Jungheera is a long poem written by Henry Louis Vivian Derozio, first published in 1829. The poem is 2,050 lines long, and was published when Derozio was only 19. It is notable for being the first long poem written by any Indian in the English language, and forms a central part of Derozio's legacy as one of the founding Anglo-Indian poets. The poem tells the tragic story of a young woman named Nuleeni, who has been brought to her late husband's funeral pyre to commit sati when she is rescued by a band of thieves led by her childhood friend, the titular fakir. Her father convinces the nawab of Rajmahal to recapture her with his army; in the ensuing battle, many die, including Nuleeni and her lover. The poem has been compared to Lord Byron's so-called "Turkish Tales" like The Giaour and to Letitia Elizabeth Landon's poem "The Improvisatrice".
