= Peary Chand Mitra =

Indian author and journalist (1814–1883)

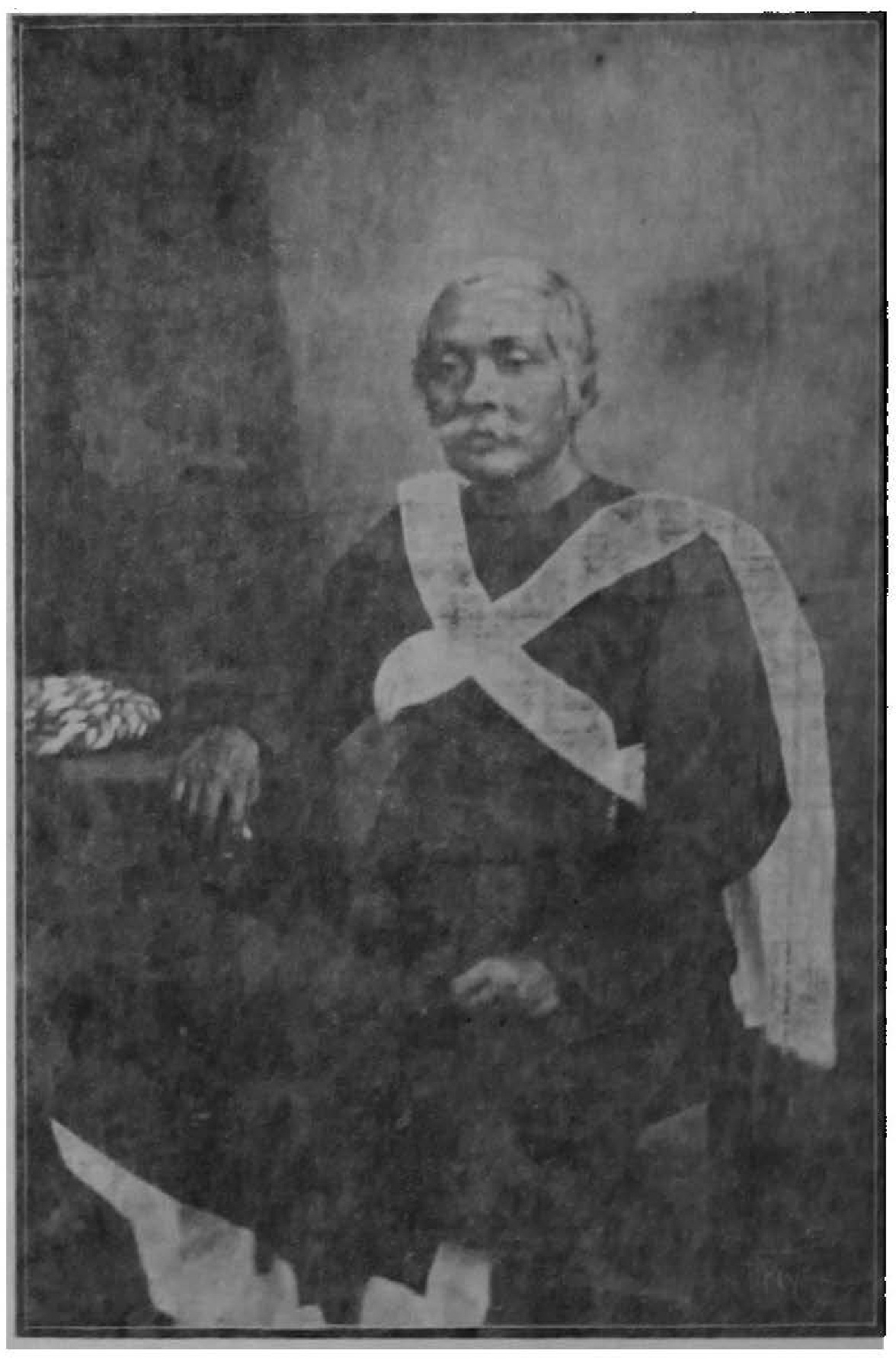
- Portrait of Peary Chand Mitra, c. 1906
- Born: 22 July 1814; Calcutta, Bengal Presidency, British India (now Kolkata, West Bengal, India)
- Died: 23 November 1883 (aged 69); Calcutta, British India (now Kolkata, India)
- Other name: Tek Chand Thakur
- Occupations: Writer, journalist, cultural activist, entrepreneur
- Notable work: Alaler Gharer Dulal (1857)

Peary Chand Mitra (22 July 1814 – 23 November 1883) was an Indian writer, journalist, cultural activist and entrepreneur. His pseudonym was Tek Chand Thakur. He was a member of Henry Derozio's Young Bengal group, who played a leading role in the Bengal Renaissance with the introduction of simple Bengali prose. His Alaler Gharer Dulal pioneered the novel in the Bengali language, leading to a tradition taken up by Bankim Chandra Chatterjee and others. Mitra died on 23 November 1883 in Kolkata.

== Early life ==
Mitra was born at Calcutta on 22 July 1814. His ancestral village was Panisehala in Hooghly District of present-day West Bengal. His father, Ramnarayan Mitra, moved from Panisehala, Hooghli District to Calcutta in early life and made his fortunes as banians to European merchants and officials. Kishori Chand Mitra was his brother. As was the custom at that time, he started learning Persian at a young age and in 1827 joined the Hindu College, where he started learning English. While still a student he started a school in his own home to teach others in his locality what he learnt. At some point in time his friends Rasik Krishna Mallick, Radhanath Sikdar and Sib Chandra Deb joined him to bolster his efforts. David Hare and Derozio helped him as well.

== Career ==
Mitra joined Calcutta Public Library as deputy librarian in 1836. The library was established the same year in the residence of an Englishman named Strong in the Esplanade. It was later shifted to Fort William College and when the Metcalfe Hall was constructed to pay respect to the memory of Charles Metcalfe, the library was moved to the hall in 1844. Mitra rapidly rose up the ladder as librarian, secretary and finally curator, a position he held till his retirement.

He was associated with a variety of social welfare activities of his day. He was a member of the Calcutta University Senate, the society for prevention of cruelty to animals, and the Bethune Society. He was secretary of the British India Society (later Association). He was also a Justice of the Peace.

He had a strong interest in the development of agriculture in the country. His criticism of the permanent settlement, The Zemindar and Ryots, created a sensation. While a member of the Agricultural Society, he started an organisation for the translation of books on agriculture from English to Bengali. In 1881, when Madame Blavatsky and Col Olcott visited India, he became involved with the Theosophical Society.

== Journalism and literary work ==
Mitra was a contributor to the Englishman, Indian Field, Hindu Patriot, Friend of India, Calcutta Review, Bengal Harkara and Bengal Spectator. Along with his Derozian friend Rasik Krishna Mallick, he edited the Jnananeswan. Another Derozian, Ram Gopal Ghosh, was associated with it.

His major literary works include:

- Alaler Gharer Dulal (1857)
- Mad Khaoya Bada Day Jat Thakar ki Upay (1859)
- Ramaranjika (1860)
- Krsipath (1861)
- Bamatoshini (1881)
- Abhedi (1871)
- Jatkinchit (1865)
- Adhyantika (1881)

In English he wrote A Biographical Sketch of David Hare (1877), The Spiritual Stray Leaves (1879), Stray Thought of Spiritualism (1879), and Life of Dewan Ramkamal Sen (1880) and an essay named The Zamindar and Royats. That was the age when Iswar Chandra Vidyasagar was writing Bengali heavily loaded with Sanskrit words and Akshay Kumar Datta was experimenting with the language in Tattwabodhini Patrika. Both were masters of Sanskrit and used all the ornamentation of that rich language. Bengali prose was in its infancy. Learned people used to poke fun at it and ridiculed the language, and a newspaper such as Iswar Chandra Gupta's Sambad Prabhakar published all that.

In 1857, Mitra and Radhanath Sikdar started a small magazine, Masik Patrika, which used simple spoken Bengali prose everybody could understand. It was a major breakthrough in the use of Bengali, and the magazine instantly became popular. His novel Alaler Gharer Dulal, written under the pseudonym Tek Chand Thakur, used simple Bengali prose, closer to the spoken speech of the day, and was serialised in the magazine. It was one of the earliest Bengali novels and became an instant success. So great was its popularity that the language style came to be known as 'Alali'. That set the trend for Bengali prose then. In 1864, Bankim Chandra Chattopadhyay published his first novel Durgeshnandini to finally lay down the standard for Bengali prose. Alaler Ghare Dulal was later translated into English.

=== Dickens of Bengal ===
Rev. James Long was a keen observer of the literary scene in Bengal and referred to Mitra as 'the Dickens of Bengal'. He was imprisoned and fined for writing a preface to the English translation of Dinabandhu Mitra's controversial play Nil Darpan. The translation was done by Michael Madhusudan Dutt.

== Entrepreneurship ==
In later life, Mitra became a successful businessman. Along with his Derozian friend Tarachand Chakraborti, he was involved in export-import business Pearychand & Tarachand Limited.

== Family ==
Mitra had a brother Kishori Chand Mitra, a civil servant. He had four sons – Amrita Lal Mitra, Chuuni Lal Mitra, Heera Lal Mitra and Nagendra Lal Mitra and a daughter Uma Shashi Mitra.
