= Ramgopal Ghosh =

Indian social reformer (1815–1868)

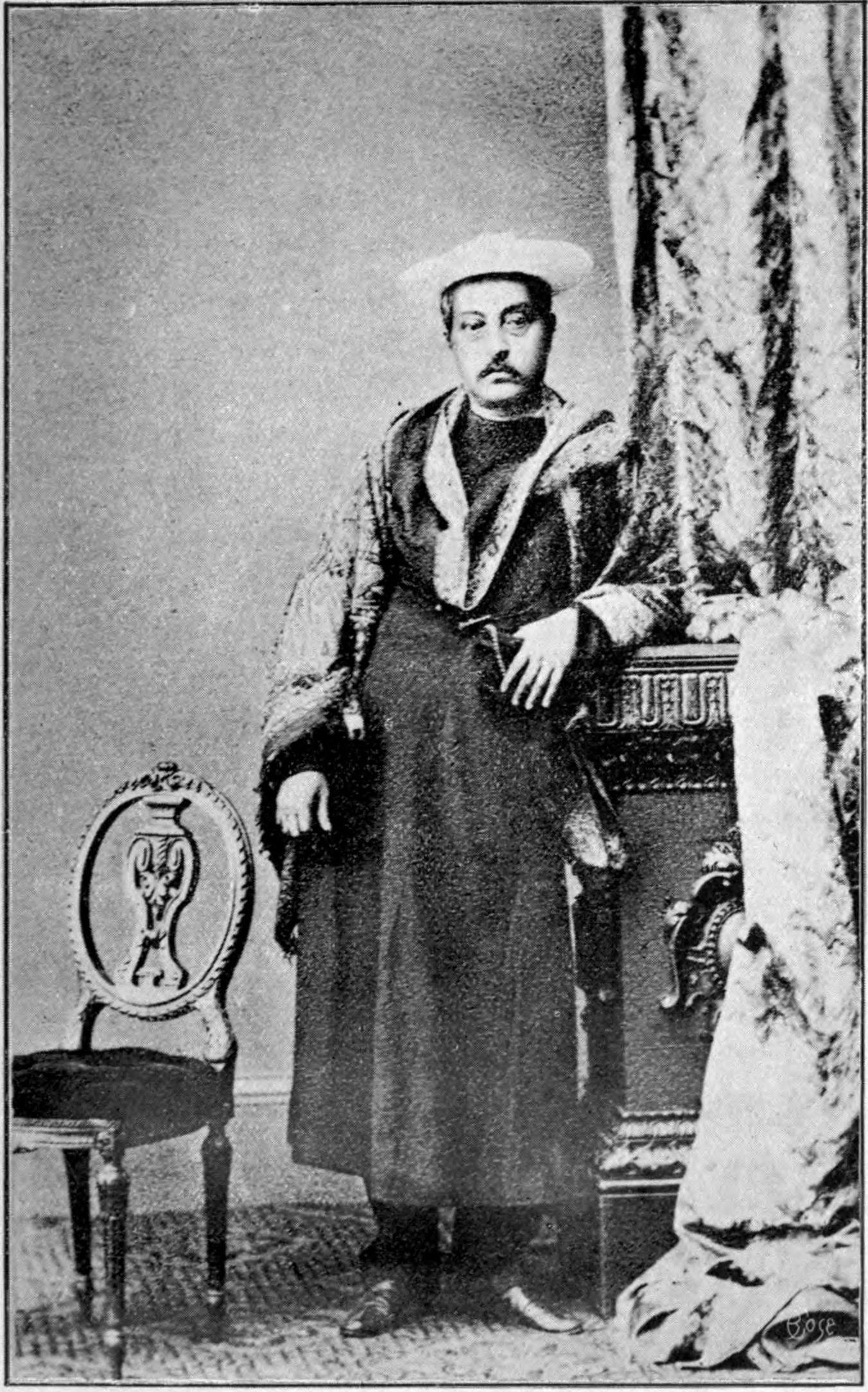
- Born: 15 January 1815; Calcutta, Bengal Presidency, British India
- Died: 25 January 1868 (aged 53); Calcutta, Bengal Presidency, British India
- Occupation: Social Reformer
- Organization: Young Bengal

Ramgopal Ghosh (15 January 1815 – 25 January 1868) was a leader of the Young Bengal Group, a successful businessman, orator and social reformer. He is called the 'Demosthenes of India'. Ghosh was one of the personalities who helped John Elliot Drinkwater Bethune establish a girls' school in Calcutta.

Ramgopal Ghosh received his early education at the Hare Preparatory school and joined the Hindu College in 1824 where he studied under Henry Louis Vivian Derozio. He started his career as a clerk in the firm Messrs. Colvin & Co. and rose to manage the firm. In 1846, he opened a trading firm in his own name, styled R. G. Ghose & Co.

Ramgopal Ghosh was one of the earliest public agitators in Bengal. He was connected with several literary and political associations, such as "The Academic Institution", the "Epistolary Association" and the "Society for the Acquisition of General Knowledge". He contributed to a paper called the Gyananashun. For some time he was the editor of this paper, and when it ceased to exist, he started another called the Spectator and later the Durpan.

In 1861, he was nominated as a member of the Bengal Legislative Council, but could not join owing to failing health. He died on 25 January 1868.
