= Sacred Heart Church, Chandannagar =

Church in West Bengal

Coordinates: 22.8574°N 88.3681°E

The Sacred Heart Church (French: Église du Sacré-Cœur, pronounced [e.ɡliz dy sakʁe kœʁ]; pronounced [ˈpobit̪ːɾoˑ ˈɦɾid̪ɔe̯ ɡiɾdʒaˑ]) is a Roman Catholic heritage church situated at Chandannagar in Hooghly district of the Indian state of West Bengal. It is under the Archdiocese of Calcutta, and it is a heritage site declared by the West Bengal Heritage Commission. The structure is an authentic expression of French architectural style in India.

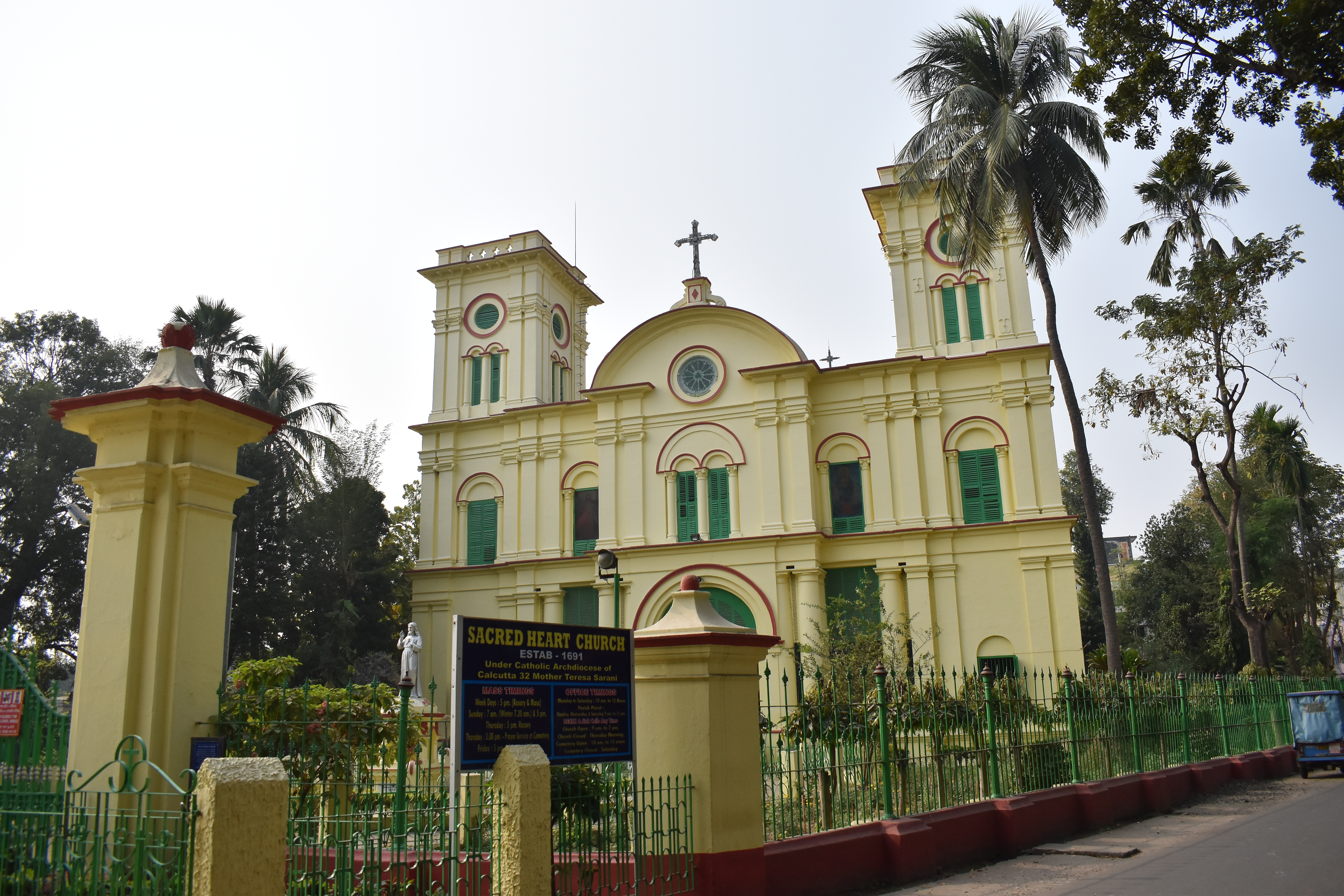
The Sacred Heart Church

== History ==
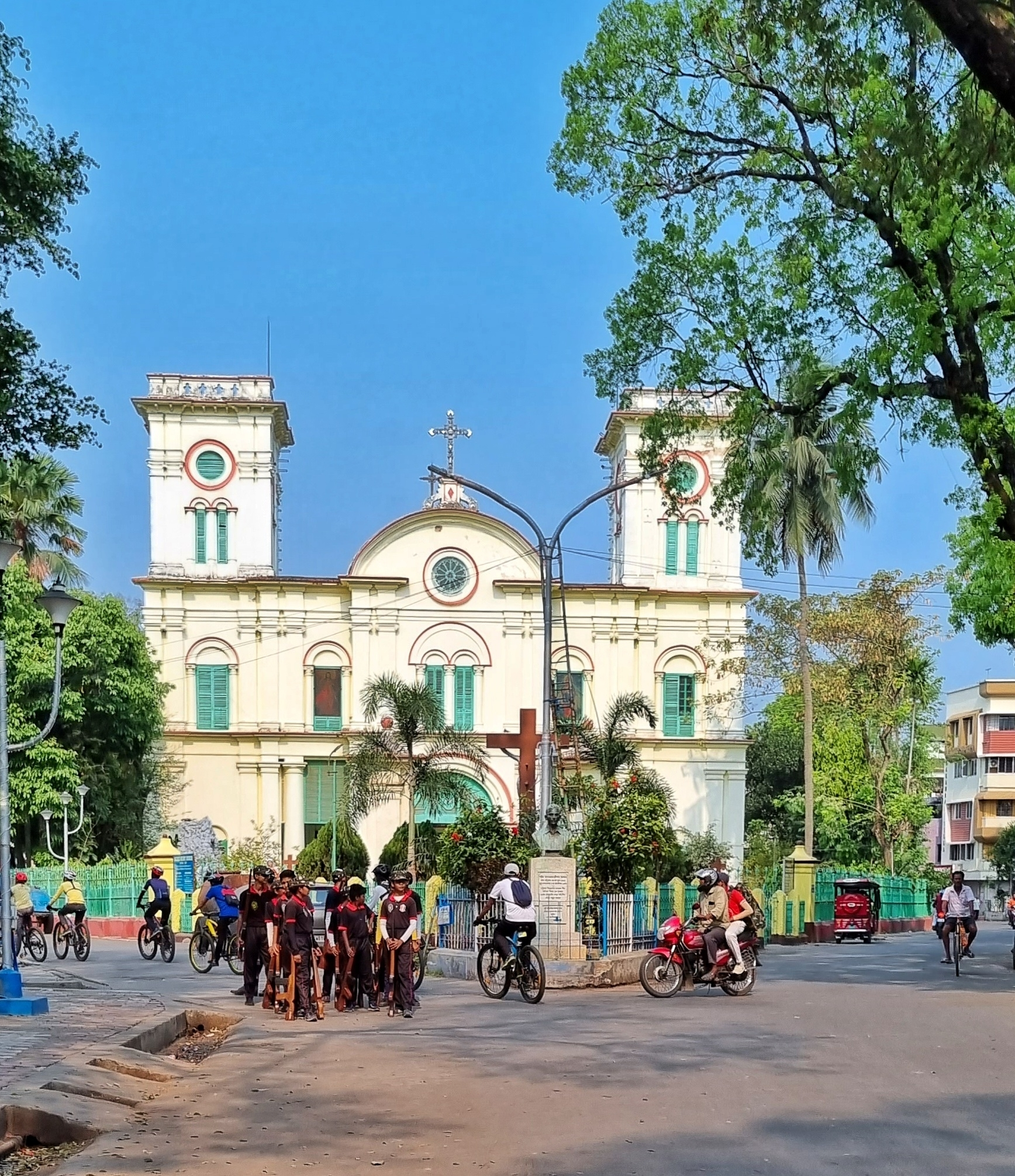
Front view, and visitors at the Sacred Heart Church in Chandannagar, March 2023.

The Sacred Heart Church was inaugurated on 27 January 1884 by Paul Goethals, the Archbishop of Calcutta. Construction started in 1875, during the rule of the French East India Company in Chandannagar, and was completed in 1884 at the instance of Rev. M. Barthet, assisted by his brother Joachim. It was designed by French architect Jacques Duchatz. There is a graveyard named Sacred Heart French Cemetery, maintained by the church.
