= Ramtanu Lahiri =

Indian scholar and activist (1813–1898)

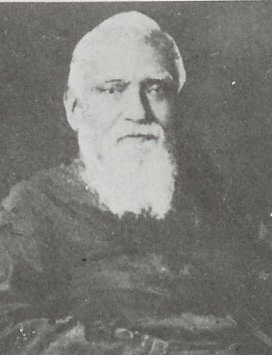
- Born: 1813; Krishnanagar, Nadia, Bengal Presidency
- Died: 18 August 1898 (aged 84–85); Calcutta, Bengal Presidency
- Occupations: Educationist, reformer

Ramtanu Lahiri (1813–1898) was a Young Bengal leader, a teacher and a social reformer. Peary Chand Mitra wrote about him, "There are few persons in whom the milk of kindness flows so abundantly. He was never wanting in appreciation of what was right, and in his sympathy with the advanced principles." Sivanath Sastri's Ramtanu Lahiri O Tatkalin Bangasamaj, published in 1903, was not only his biography but also an overview of Bengali society of the era, "a remarkable social document on the period of the Bengal Renaissance."

== See also ==
- Young Bengal
- Ramtanu Lahiri O Tatkalin Bangasamaj
