= Sacred Heart French Cemetery =

Cemetery in West Bengal

Coordinates: 22.8655°N 88.3682°E

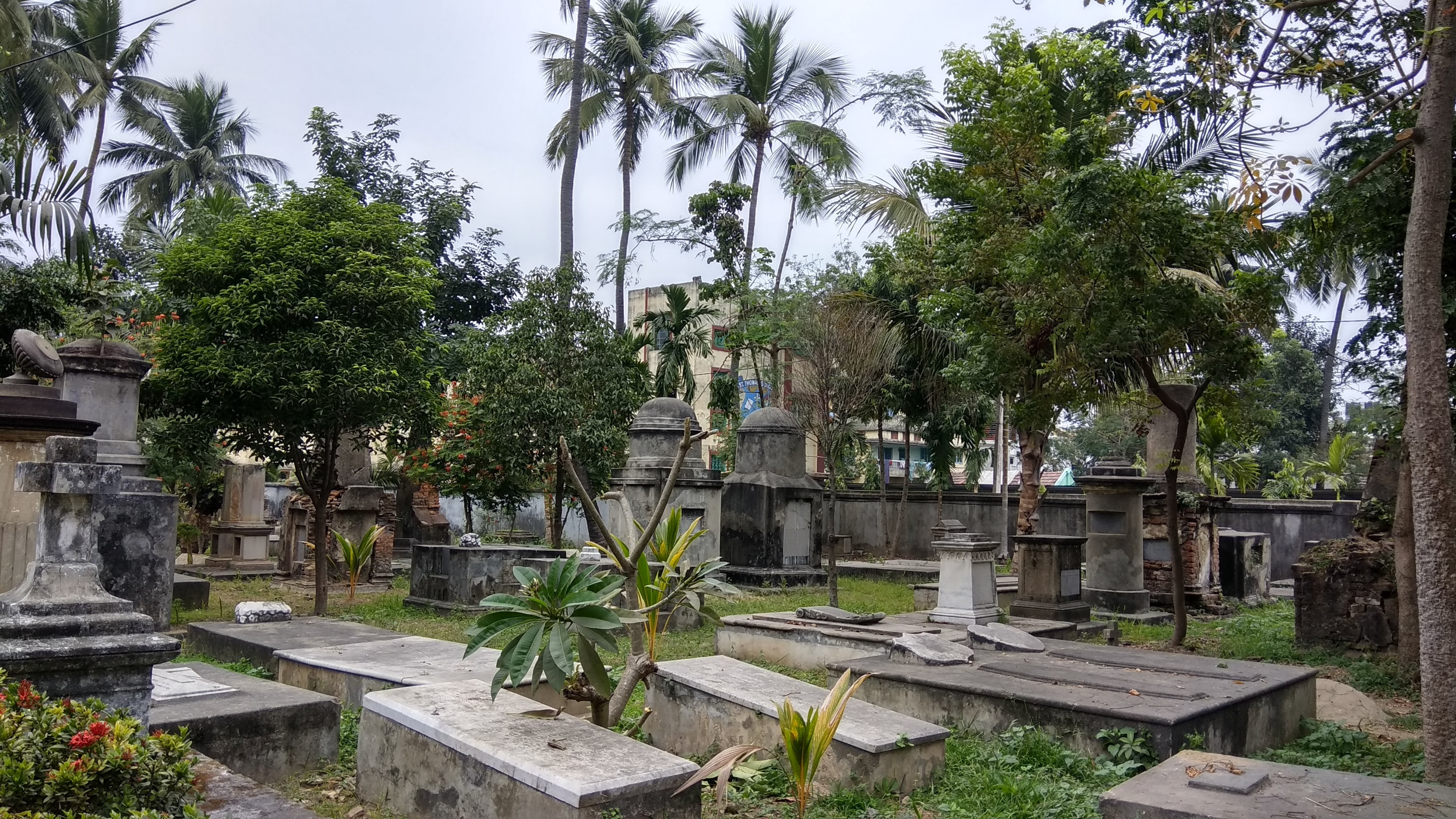
- Sacred Heart French Cemetery
- Interactive map of Sacred Heart French Cemetery

Details
- Location: Laldighi, Chandannagar, Hooghly district, West Bengal
- Country: India
- Type: Roman Catholic
- Owned by: Sacred Heart Church
- No. of graves: 150 approximately

Sacred Heart French Cemetery is a Roman Catholic cemetery located at Laldighi in Chandannagar, West Bengal, which is associated with the Sacred Heart Church.

== History ==
Chandannagar was established as an early French settlement in India by the French East India Company. The cemetery was set up to serve the French Catholic community of the colony. The burial grounds contains the graves of French administrators, missionaries, soldiers and local Catholics as well as their families. It has approximately 150 tombs.

== Notable graves ==
- Henry Piddington
- Leon Margain
- Anne-Marie Javouhey
- Radhanath Sikdar

== External link ==
- Media related to Sacred Heart French Cemetery at Wikimedia Commons
