= To India - My Native Land =

Poem by Henry Louis Vivian Derozio

- by Henry Louis Vivian Derozio
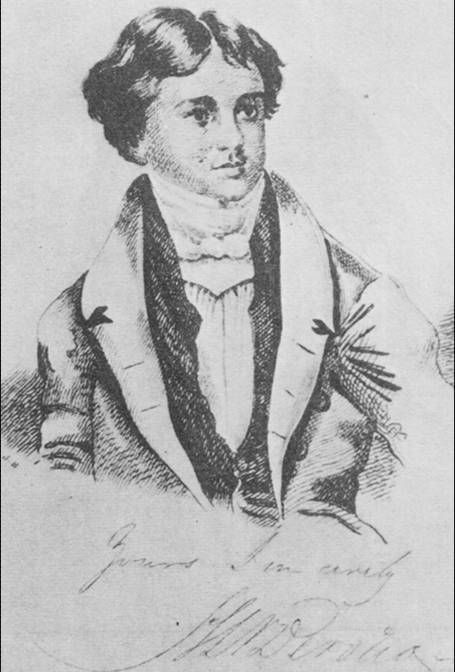
- First published in: The Fakeer of Jungheera
- Country: India
- Language: English
- Subject: British rule
- Form: Petrarchan sonnet
- Meter: Iambic pentameter
- Rhyme scheme: ABABABCC DEDEFF
- Publication date: 1828
- Lines: 14

To India - My Native Land is a poem by Indian poet Henry Louis Vivian Derozio, first published in 1828 as part of his book The Fakeer of Jungheera: A Metrical Tale and Other Poems. In that book, the poem is untitled; Francis Bradley-Birt added the title when publishing a collection of Derozio's poems in 1923. It is one of the most notable works by Derozio.

The poem has been identified by historians as containing some of the first written examples of Indian nationalism, with the poem extolling "patriotism and a love of freedom".

== Summary ==
To India - My Native Land

My country! in thy day of glory past
A beauteous halo circled round thy brow,
And worshipped as a deity thou wast—
Where is thy glory, where the reverence now?
Thy eagle pinion is chained down at last,
And grovelling in the lowly dust art thou:
Thy minstrel hath no wreath to weave for thee
Save the sad story of thy misery!—
Well–let me dive into the depths of time,
And bring from out the ages that have rolled
A few small fragments of those wrecks sublime,
Which human eyes may never more behold;
And let the guerdon of my labour be
My fallen country! one kind wish for thee!

Derozio's poem elates at length of his view on the state of India under the rule of the East India Company, writing that compared to "thy day of glory past" the country has now been "chained down at last", and is reduced to "grovelling in the lowly dust". Despite this, Derozio writes that India may rise again and "bring from out the ages that have rolled".

== Major themes ==
The themes of the poem concern primarily nationalism and patriotism. Derozio writes of the "past glory" of India and how the country that was once "worshipped as a deity" has been chained down to the lowest depths. Derozio writes about some of that heritage of the distant past and in return hopes for a "kind wish" from the country and its people.

The poem uses the image of a golden bird, thus hinting at the past glory of India as imagined by Derozio. Words such as "halo", "deity", "worship" elevate the nation to the imagined height and then words such as "chained", "grovelling", and "lowly dust" sharply contrast the current state of the country. The misery and lament of the poet invites the reader to join in his sorrow. Historians have written that Derozio was influenced by the Romantic-era poetry of Byron and Southey.

== Style ==
The poem is a Petrarchan sonnet with a rhyme scheme of ABABABCC DEDEFF. The poem shows influences of Romantic poets.
