= Poems (Derozio) =

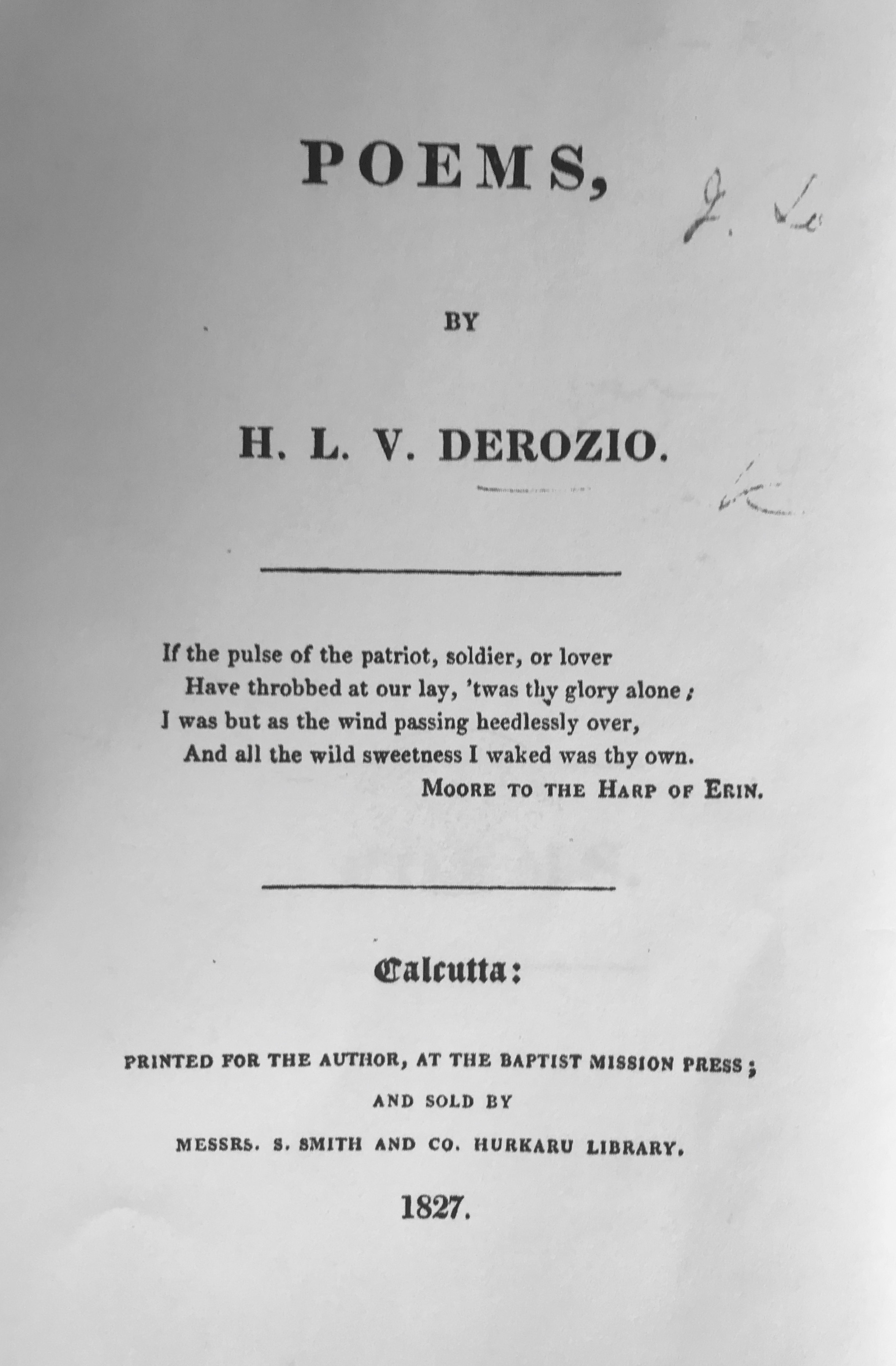
- Author: Henry Louis Vivian Derozio
- Language: English
- Publisher: Baptist Mission Press
- Publication date: 1827
- Publication place: Bengal Presidency, British India

Poems, by H.L.V. Derozio is a book of poetry by Henry Louis Vivian Derozio, first published in Calcutta in 1827.

== Contents ==
=== "The Harp of India" ===
This sonnet is the first poem of the volume, coming directly after Derozio's preface, and serves to assert Derozio's presence as a poet. It is dated to March 1827. Derozio uses a conventional apostrophe to a harp (representing poetry), mourning India's recent loss of a poetic tradition and expressing hope that he might be able to revive it. The poem is an allusion to Thomas Moore's "Dear Harp of My Country," which Derozio quotes as an epigraph (cited as "Moore to the Harp of Erin") on the title page of his own Poems.

=== "Song of the Hindoostanee Minstrel" ===
This poem is now more usually referred to with the spelling "Hindustani". In Poems, it is dated to May 1827, and Derozio includes two footnotes to explain his references to surmah and a sitar.

The poem is structured around three main points. First the speaker describes the beauty of his beloved (a Kashmiri girl). Next, he speaks about poverty. Finally, he assures his beloved that soon they will see better days. At the end of the poem the poet presents the optimistic picture in front of his beloved, he says that though the world may change, their love for each other will remain the same, and will continue to love each other till their end. The poem has been compared to the vision of the lovers in the poem "The Last Ride Together" by Robert Browning.
