= Young Bengal =

Group of Bengali free thinkers emerging from Hindu College, Calcutta

The Young Bengal was a group of Bengali free thinkers emerging from Hindu College, Calcutta. They were also known as Derozians, after their firebrand teacher at Hindu College, Henry Louis Vivian Derozio.

The Young Bengal Movement peripherally included Christians such as Reverend Alexander Duff (1809–1878), who founded the General Assembly's Institution, and his students like Lal Behari Dey (1824–1892), who went on to renounce Hinduism. Latter-day inheritors of the legacy of the Young Bengal Movement include scholars like Brajendra Nath Seal (1864–1938), who went on to be one of the leading theologians and thinkers of the Brahmo Samaj. The Derozians however failed to have a long-term impact. Derozio was removed from the Hindu college in 1831 because of radicalism. The main reason for their limited success was social conditions prevailing at that time which were not ripe for adoption of radical ideas. Further, they did not link masses through peasant causes.

Young Bengal followed classical economics and was composed of free traders who took inspiration from Jeremy Bentham, Adam Smith, and David Ricardo:

"With respect to the questions relating to Political Economy, they all belong to the school of Adam Smith. They are clearly of opinion that the system of monopoly, the restraints upon trade, and the international laws of many countries, do nothing but paralyse the efforts of industry, impede the progress of agriculture and manufacture, and prevent commerce from flowing in its natural course."

== Organisations ==
Derozio and the Young Bengal group set two establishments and published journals that played a role in the Bengal Renaissance. These are noted below:

=== Academic Association ===
Derozio joined Hindu College in 1826 and within a short period attracted students. The Academic Association was established in 1828 under the guidance of Derozio and settled down in Maniktala. Derozio was its president. One of his students, Uma Charan Basu, was its secretary. The principal speakers in the association were: Rasik Krishna Mallick, Krishna Mohan Banerjee, Ramgopal Ghosh, Radhanath Sikdar, Dakshinaranjan Mukherjee, and Hara Chandra Ghosh. Amongst its organisers were Ramtanu Lahiri, Sib Chandra Deb and Peary Chand Mitra.

=== Society for the Acquisition of General Knowledge ===
The Society for the Acquisition of General Knowledge was established on 20 February 1838. It had 200 members in 1843. Currently, this is one of the student societies at Presidency University, Kolkata, that promotes quizzing and related activities among students.

== Prominent members ==
- Krishna Mohan Banerjee (1813–1885) Christian convert
- Tarachand Chakraborti (1805–1855), prominent in the Brahmo Sabha and Young Bengal
- Sib Chandra Deb (1811–1890), a prominent Brahmo Samaj leader of Konnagar
- Hara Chandra Ghosh (1808–1868), judge of the Small Causes Court
- Ramgopal Ghosh (1815–1868), businessman and public speaker
- Ramtanu Lahiri (1813–1898), teacher who publicly removed his sacred thread in 1851
- Rasik Krishna Mallick (1810–1858), refused to swear by the holy Ganges water and ran away from his orthodox home
- Peary Chand Mitra (1814–1883), founded the Monthly Magazine in Bengali and helped establish the Calcutta Public Library in 1831
- Dakshinaranjan Mukherjee (1818–1887), donated the site for the Bethune College for women
- Radhanath Sikdar (1813–1870), surveyor, mathematician, diarist, writer, public speaker and the calculator of the height of the Himalayas.
