= HMS Creole =

Five ships of the Royal Navy have borne the name HMS Creole:

- HMS Creole, formerly the French frigate Créole (1797), captured from the French in 1803, foundered in the Atlantic Ocean on 3 January 1804.
- HMS Creole was a fifth rate ordered in 1803, with the order being cancelled in 1809.
- HMS Creole (1813) was a fifth-rate frigate launched in 1813 and broken up in 1833.
- HMS Creole (1845) was a sixth-rate frigate launched in 1845 and broken up in 1875.
- HMS Creole (R82) was a C-class destroyer launched in 1945, sold to the Pakistan Navy in 1958, and renamed PNS Alamgir. She was scrapped in 1982.
