= Kishori Chand Mitra =

Indian author and civil servant

- Born: May 22, 1822; Calcutta, British India (present-day Kolkata, West Bengal, India)
- Died: August 6, 1873 (aged 51); Calcutta, British India (present-day Kolkata, West Bengal, India)
- Education: Hindu College
- Spouse: Kailashbasini Devi
- Parent: Ramnarayan Mitra
- Relatives: Peary Chand Mitra (brother)

Kishori Chand Mitra (1822 – 1873) was a writer, civil servant and social worker.

== Early life and education ==
Mitra was born in Kolkata although his ancestral village is Panisheola in Hooghly District of present-day West Bengal. His brother was writer Peary Chand Mitra. He studied in Hindu College (later renamed to Presidency University).

== Career ==
Since 1846 Mitra served as the deputy magistrate of Rampur-Boalia (present Rajshahi) for about eight years. He served as the police magistrate of Kolkata during 1854–1858.

Mitra founded a weekly newspaper Indian Field in 1859. Later, in 1865, it was merged with the Hindoo Patriot. He contributed to the Calcutta Review, Hindoo Patriot, Bengal Spectator and Bengal Magazine. He was involved in the foundation and functioning of the Hare Memorial Society, Bethune Society, Social Science Association and Hindu Theosophical Society.
