= John Drinkwater Bethune =

British Army officer and historian (1762–1844)

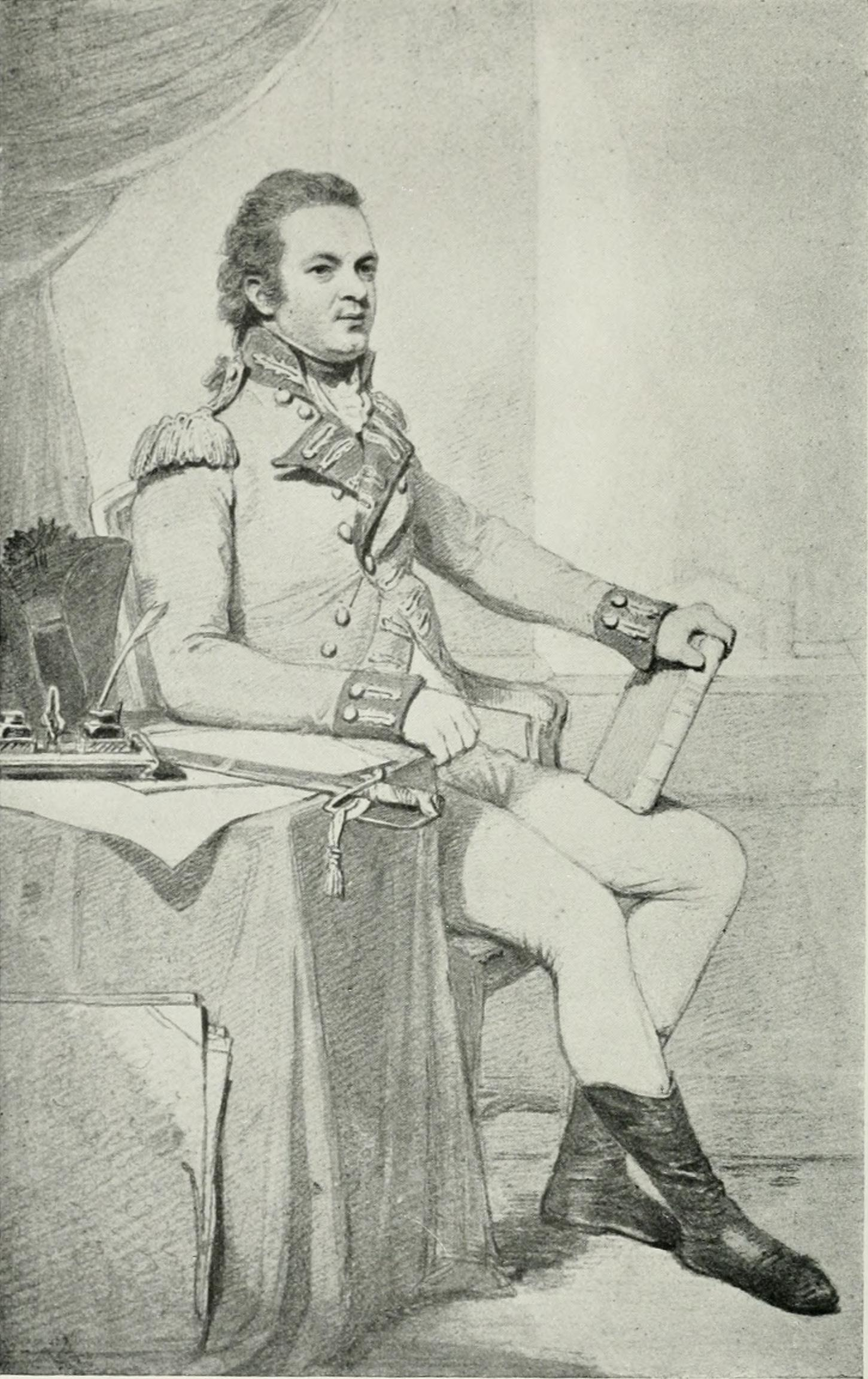
- 1785 portrait
- Born: 9 June 1762; Latchford, Cheshire
- Died: 16 January 1844 (aged 81); Leatherhead, Surrey
- Spouse: Eleanor Congalton

Signature
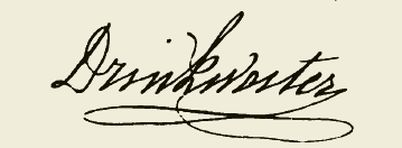

Notes
- Arms: Party per pale, gu. and az., on a fesse, wavy, arg., three billets, of the second, between three garbs or. Crest: Three wheat-ears, two in saltier, one in pale, or, encircled by a ducal coronet. Motto: Labore omnia florent (Everything flourishes through work)

Colonel John Drinkwater Bethune (born John Drinkwater, 9 June 1762 – 16 January 1844) was a British Army officer and historian best known for his account of the Great Siege of Gibraltar that came out in 1785.

== Origins ==
Born at Latchford on 9 June 1762, he was the eldest son of John Drinkwater (1740–1797), a surgeon in the Royal Navy, and his first wife Elizabeth Andrews.

== Career ==
At the age of fifteen he joined the 72nd Regiment of Foot (Royal Manchester Volunteers) as an ensign and was almost immediately posted to Gibraltar. From June 1779 to February 1783 this small British possession was under siege from French and Spanish forces, during which time he kept a careful record of events. When peace came, he had become a captain but his regiment was sent back to Britain and disbanded. From his notes he wrote A history of the late siege of Gibraltar, 1779–1783, with a description and account of that garrison from the earliest period, published in 1785, which was widely read and frequently reprinted. As a soldier, Drinkwater was more interested in the military than in the civil aspects, yet his account does give some glimpses of the sufferings of the civilians.

In 1787 he rejoined the British Army in the 2nd Battalion of the 1st (Royal) Regiment of Foot and returned to Gibraltar. There he was publicly thanked by the military commander, General Eliott, for his book and was given funds to establish the Gibraltar Garrison Library. The regiment was then sent to defend Toulon against the French, where he acted as military secretary until the British had to evacuate in December 1793. From there, he served under the viceroy, Sir Gilbert Eliott, as military secretary and deputy judge-advocate of the Kingdom of Corsica until the French captured the island in October 1796.

He returned to England with Sir Gilbert in the captured French frigate HMS Minerve. Under Captain George Cockburn, it carried the flag of Commodore Horatio Nelson, whom Drinkwater had made friends with in Corsica. On the way they encountered a Spanish fleet off Cape St Vincent and were involved in the ensuing battle. Drinkwater thought that the achievements of Nelson, who was not mentioned in the published dispatches, had been underestimated and he published anonymously A Narrative of the Battle of St Vincent to do justice to his friend.

His next post was again administrative, to sort out the complicated finances of the British occupations of Toulon and Corsica. Between 1794 and 1796 he became first a major and then a lieutenant-colonel, after which he was placed on half-pay with the rank of colonel. In 1799 he married, and was also appointed commissary general of the British forces in the Anglo-Russian invasion of Holland, where he served until evacuation in November 1799. In 1801 he was appointed to the household of the King's brother, the Duke of Kent, who became a close friend.

In 1805 he was nominated a member of the parliamentary commission of military inquiry, becoming its chairman later. His experience there led to the offer of a ministerial post in 1807, to serve under William Windham as Under-Secretary of State for War and the Colonies, but he declined. In 1811 he was appointed comptroller of army accounts, and held the office for 25 years until it was abolished in 1835. As well as his administrative duties, he was a director of the Regent's Canal Company, earning respect for handling the company's financial crises until the canal opened in 1820.

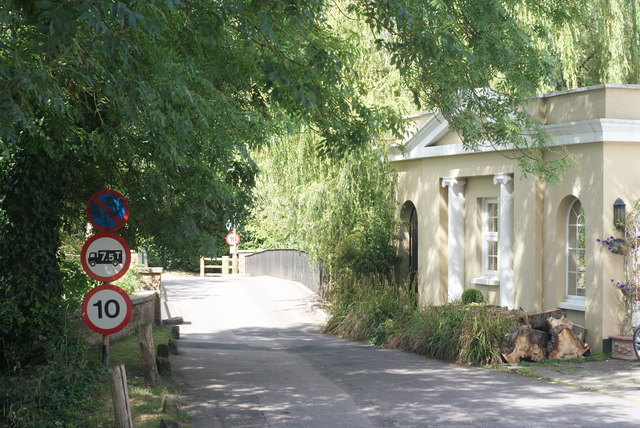
The entrance to Thorncroft Manor, his last home

His last years were spent at Thorncroft Manor, just outside Leatherhead, where although almost totally blind he carried on his literary work. Dying there on 16 January 1844, he was buried at the Church of St Mary & St Nicholas, Leatherhead.

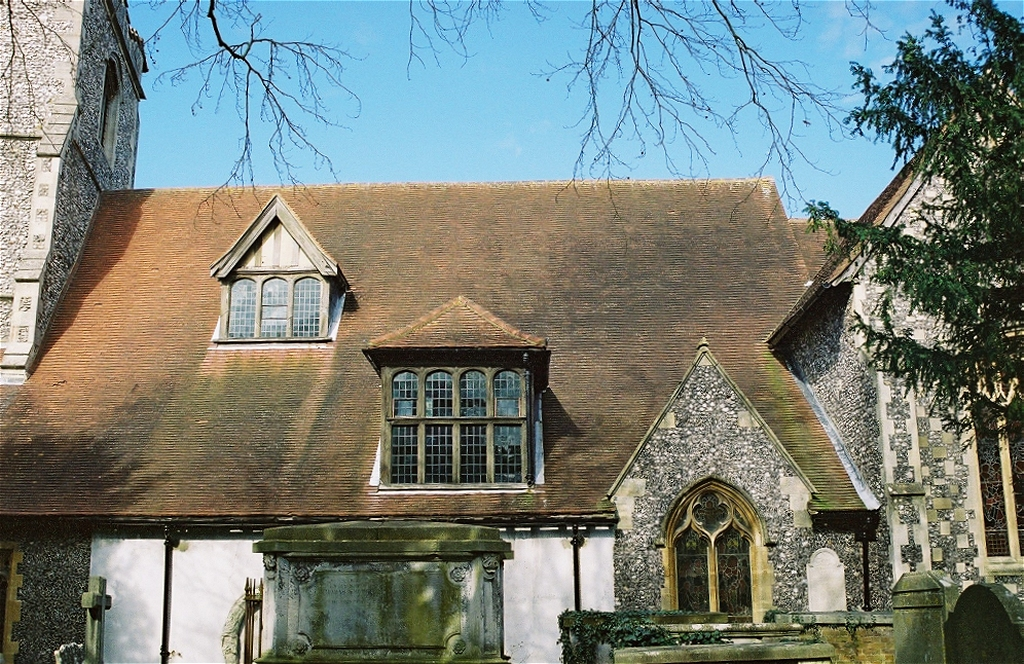
Leatherhead parish church, where he is buried

== Family ==
On 6 June 1799 at St Mary's Church, Putney, he married Eleanor (1766–1848), daughter of Charles Congalton, a captain in the Royal Navy who was laird of Congalton, and his wife Anne, daughter of Sir Gilbert Elliot, 2nd Baronet, of Minto. Her portrait by Henry Raeburn is in the Hermitage Museum at St Petersburg.

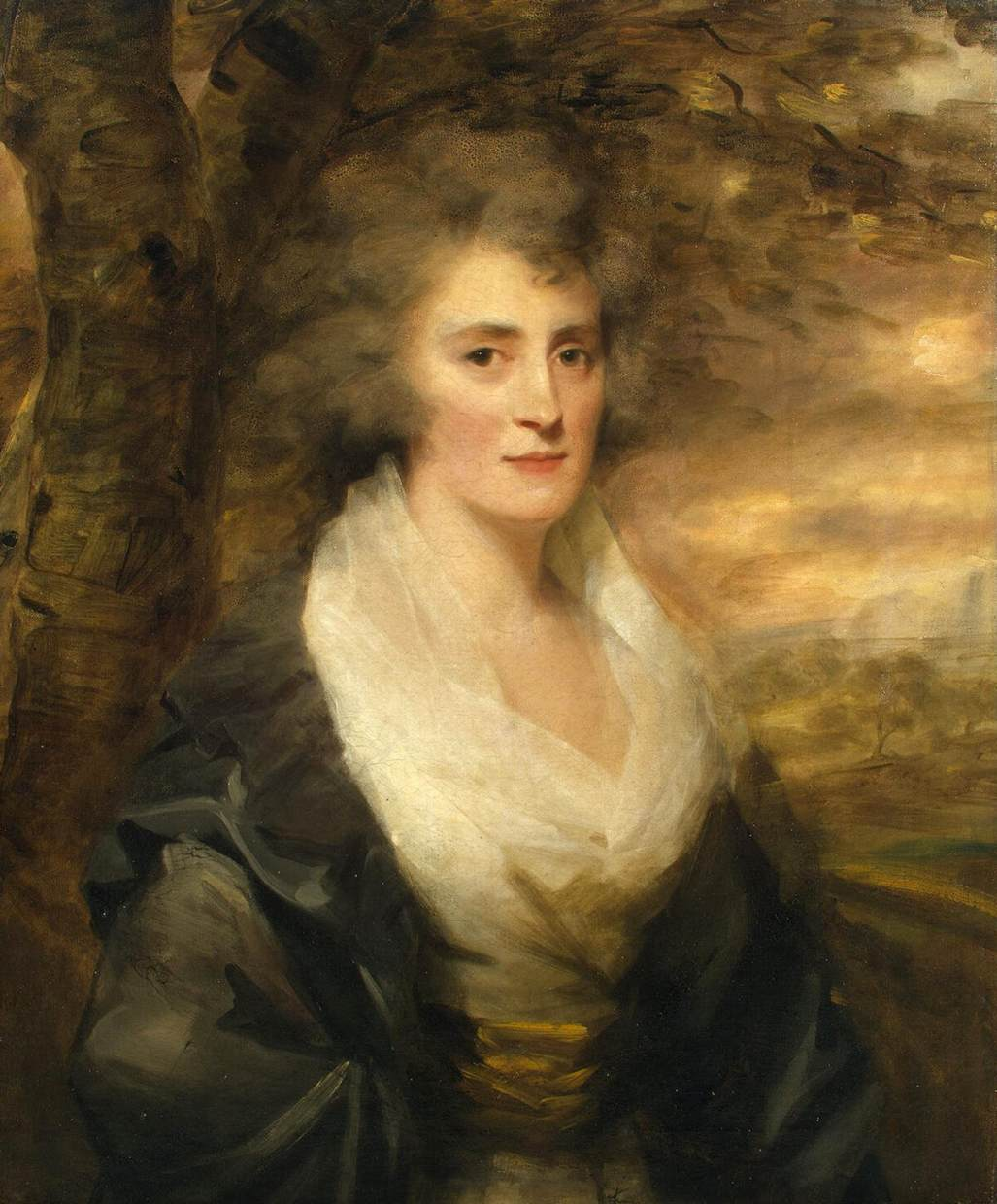
Eleanor, his wife

She had two older brothers, William and Gilbert, who in turn inherited the estate of Balfour in Fife, which had belonged to the Bethune family since about 1375, and changed their name to Bethune. When Gilbert died in 1837 without children, Eleanor was his heir and became the lady of Balfour. She and her husband both changed their name to Bethune.

They had seven children, including:

Eleanor, who married the Reverend William Thomas Hadow and was the grandmother of Sir William Henry Hadow.
John, a civil servant remembered for promoting women's education in India.
Charles, who rose to Admiral in the Royal Navy and was the father of Lieutenant-General Edward Cecil Bethune.
Mary, who married Norman James Biggs Uniacke.
Georgiana, who married Henry Malden.

== Works ==
- A History of the Siege of Gibraltar 1779–1783 (New ed.). London: John Murray. 1905.
- A Narrative of the Battle of St. Vincent (2nd ed.). London: Saunders and Otley. 1840.
- A Compendium of the Regent's Canal, Showing its Connection with the Metropolis (1830)
- Statements respecting the late departments of the comptrollership of the army accounts, showing the inconvenience which will probably result from its abolition. (1835)
