= John Elliot Drinkwater Bethune =

British educator, mathematician and polyglot in British India

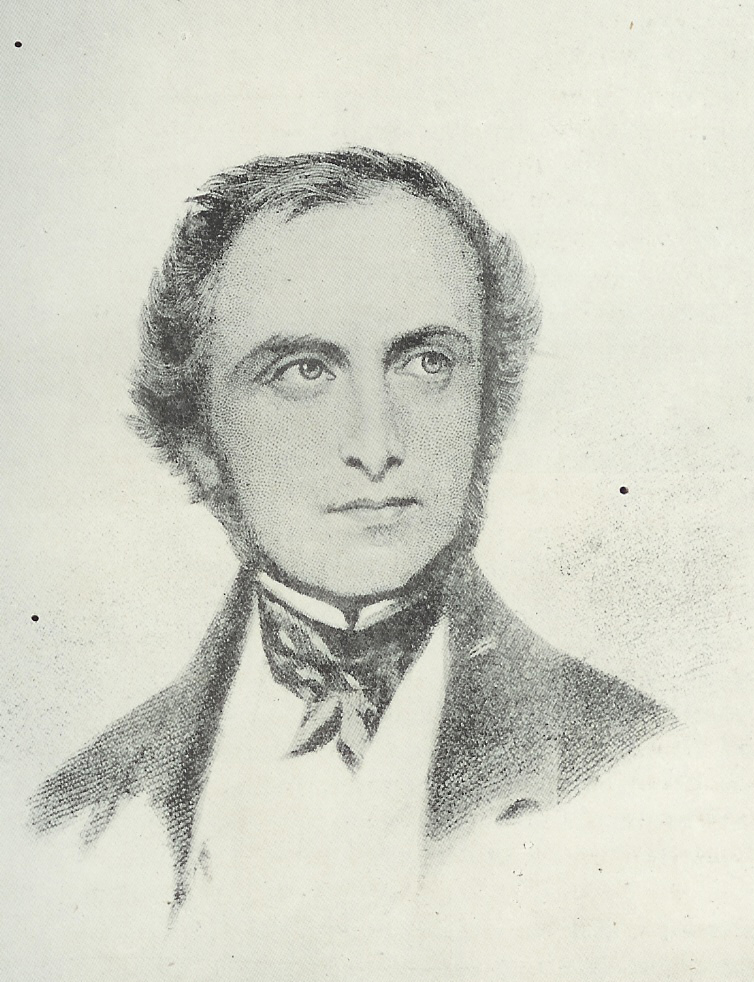
- Born: John Elliot Drinkwater; 12 July 1801; Ealing, England
- Died: 12 August 1851 (aged 50); Calcutta, Bengal Presidency
- Occupation: Lawyer
- Years active: 1848–1851
- Known for: Advocating for education of women in India during the 19th century, Founder of Bethune college
- Relatives: John Drinkwater Bethune (father)

John Elliot Drinkwater Bethune (1801–1851) was an English educator, mathematician and polyglot known for promoting women's education in India. He was the founder of Calcutta Female School (now known as Bethune College) in Calcutta, which is considered the oldest women's college in Asia. He started his professional life as a lawyer in England and came to India by his appointment as a law member of the Governor General's Council of Ministers. His efforts to further women's education were actively supported by Ishwar Chandra Vidyasagar and other members of the Bengali Renaissance.

== Early life ==
Bethune was born in Ealing, England, the elder son of John Drinkwater Bethune. He studied at Trinity College, Cambridge, after which he received employment as the Counsel of the Home Office. He drafted many essential reforms in this position, including the Municipal Reform Act, the Tithe Commutation Act and the County Courts Act. In 1848, he was appointed as a member of the Supreme Council of India and subsequently became the President of the Council of Education.

== Founding the Bethune College ==
Supported by Dakshinaranjan Mukherjee, Ramgopal Ghosh, Iswar Chandra Vidyasagar, and Madan Mohan Tarkalankar, Bethune founded the Calcutta Female School in 1849. The school started in Mukherjee's home in Baitakkhana (now known as Bowbazar), with 21 girls enrolled.

The following year, enrollment rose to 80. In November, on a plot on the west side of Cornwallis Square, the cornerstone for a permanent school building was laid. The name "Hindu Female School" was inscribed on the copper plate placed in the stone and on the ceremonial silver trowel made for the occasion. Support for the school, however, waned after Bethune's death in August 1851. The government took it over in 1856, renaming it Bethune School after its founder in 1862–63. In 1879, it was developed into Bethune College, the first women's college in Asia.

== Death and burial ==
John Elliot Bethune died in Calcutta, West Bengal, India, in 1851. He was buried in Lower Circular Road Cemetery.
