= Henry Louis Vivian Derozio =

Indian educator and poet (1809–1831)

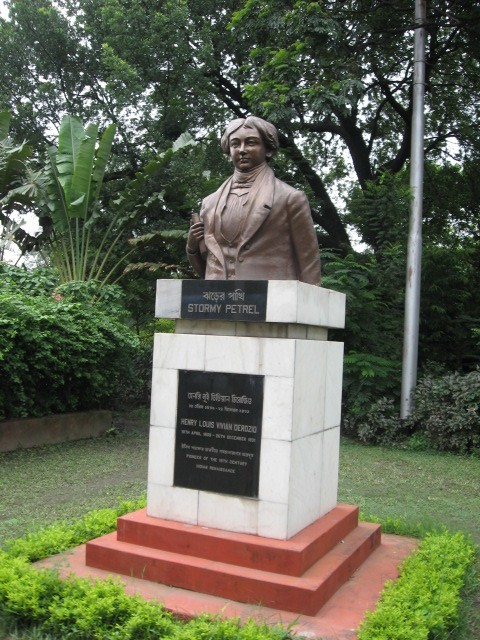
- Bust of Derozio at the Esplanade
- Born: 18 April 1809; Calcutta, Bengal Presidency, British India
- Died: 26 December 1831 (aged 22); Calcutta, Bengal Presidency, British India
- Resting place: South Park Street Cemetery, Mother Teresa Sarani
- Citizenship: India (British subject)
- Occupations: Poet and teacher
- Writing career
- Language: English and Bengali
- Genres: Academic, Educator
- Notable work: To India - My Native Land
- Movement: Bengal Renaissance

Henry Louis Vivian Derozio (18 April 1809 – 26 December 1831) was an Indian poet and assistant headmaster of Hindu College, Kolkata (now Presidency University, Kolkata). He was a radical thinker of his time and one of the first Indian educators to disseminate Western learning and science among the young men of Bengal.

Long after his early death, his legacy lived on among his former students, who came to be known as Young Bengals and many of whom became prominent in social reform, law, and journalism.

== Biography ==
=== Early life ===
Henry Louis Vivian Derozio was born on 18 April 1809 at Entally-Padmapukur in Kolkata. His parents were Francis Derozio, a Christian Indo-Portuguese office worker, and Sophia Johnson Derozio, an Anglo-Indian woman. His original family name was "do Rozário".

Derozio attended David Drummond Dharmatala Academy school from age 6 to 14. He later praised his early schooling for its liberal approach to education, particularly its unusual choice to teach Indian, Eurasian, and European children from different social classes together as peers. Derozio's later religious skepticism is sometimes attributed to David Drummond, who was known as a freethinker. Derozio was a successful student: notices in the India Gazette and the Calcutta Journal at the time mentioned Derozio's academic excellence (including several academic prizes) and successful performances in student plays. While a student, he read the poetry of his contemporaries, John Keats, Percy Shelley, and Lord Byron.

At age 14, Derozio left school to work. He initially joined his father's office in Kolkata, then shifted to his uncle's indigo factory in Bhagalpur. Inspired by the scenic beauty of the banks of the River Ganges, he started writing poetry, which he submitted to the India Gazette. His poetic career began to flourish, with poems published in multiple newspapers and periodicals, in 1825.

In 1827, when Derozio was 18, the editor John Grant took notice of his poetry, offering to publish a book of his work and inviting him to return to Kolkata. He soon became an assistant editor for Grant, as well as publishing in several other periodicals, and founding his own newspaper, the Calcutta Gazette.

=== Hindu College and Young Bengal ===
In May 1826, at age 17, he was appointed teacher in English literature and history at the new Hindu College. Derozio's intense zeal for teaching and his interactions with students created a sensation at Hindu College. He organized debates where ideas and social norms were freely debated. In 1828, he motivated students to form a literary and debating club called the Academic Association.

This was a time when Hindu society in Bengal was undergoing considerable turmoil. In 1828, Raja Ram Mohan Roy established the Brahmo Samaj, which kept Hindu ideals but denied idolatry. This resulted in a backlash within orthodox Hindu society. Derozio helped discuss the ideas for social change already in the air. Despite his youth, he was considered a great scholar and a thinker. Within a short period, he drew around him a group of intelligent boys in college. He constantly encouraged them to think freely, to question, and not to accept anything blindly. His teachings inspired the development of the spirit of liberty, equality, and freedom. They also tried to remove social evils, improve the condition of women and peasants, and promote liberty through freedom of the press, trial by jury, and so on. His activities brought about the intellectual revolution in Bengal. It was called the Young Bengal Movement and his students, also known as Derozians, were fiery patriots.

Due to backlash from conservative parents who disliked his wide-ranging and open discussion of religious issues, Derozio was dismissed from his post in April 1831, shortly before his death.

In 1838, after his death, members of the Young Bengal movement established a second society called the Society for the Acquisition of General Knowledge. Its main objective was to acquire and disseminate knowledge about the condition of the country.

=== Death ===
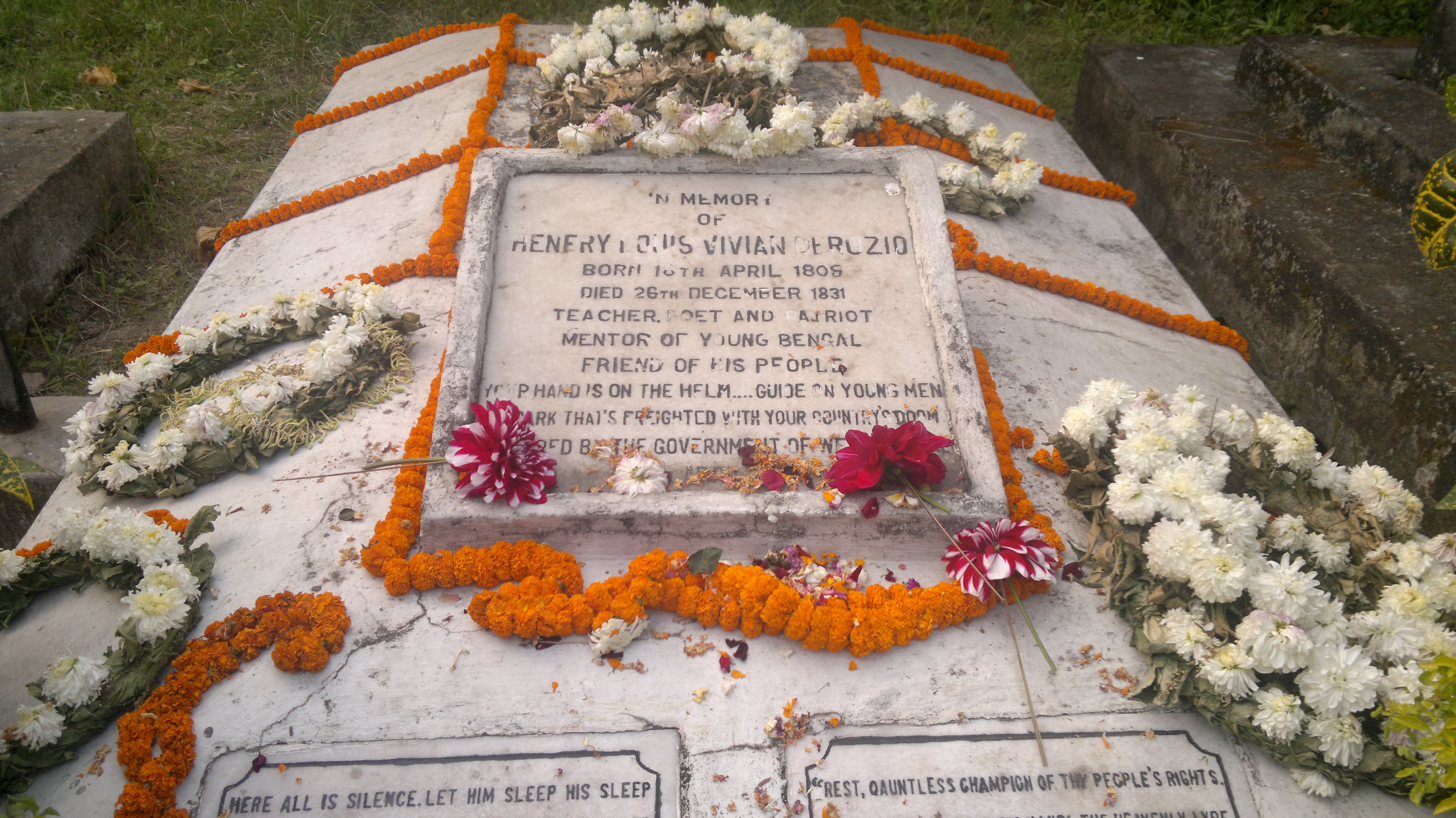
Tomb of Derozio at the South Park Street Cemetery, Kolkata.

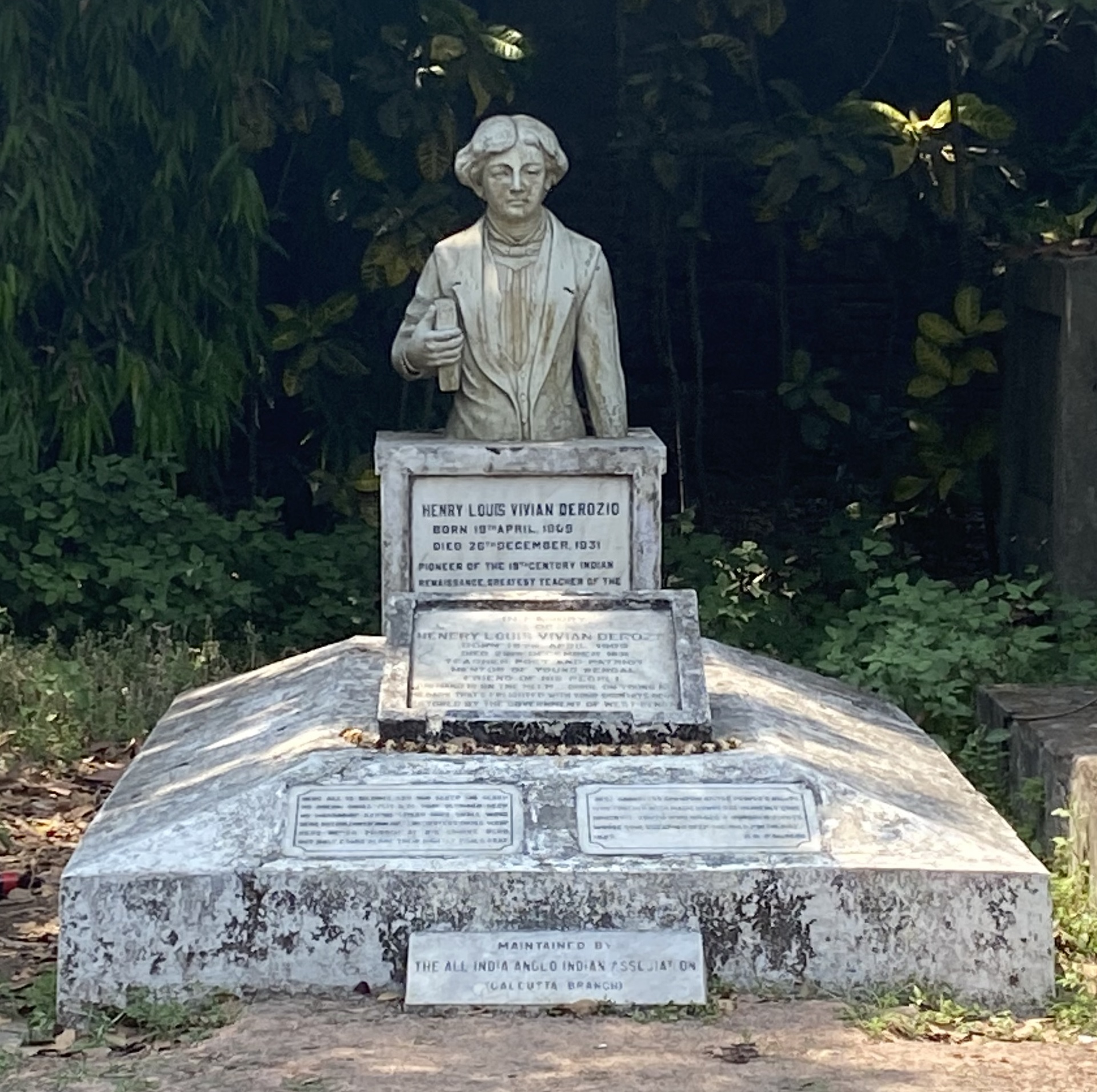
Tomb of Henry Louis Vivian Derozio at the South Park Street Cemetery

Derozio died of cholera at age 22, on 26 December 1831 in Calcutta. His body was buried in South Park Street Cemetery.

== Writing ==
Derozio was generally considered an Anglo-Indian, being of mixed Portuguese, Indian, and English descent, but he considered himself Indian. He was known during his lifetime as the first 'national' poet of modern India, and the history of Anglo-Indian poetry typically begins with him. His poems are regarded as an important landmark in the history of patriotic poetry in India, especially "To India - My Native Land" and The Fakeer of Jungheera. His poems were influenced by Romantic poetry, especially those poets like Lord Byron and Robert Southey.

=== Publications ===
- Poems (1827)
  - "The Harp of India"
  - "Song of the Hindoostani Minstrel"
- The Fakeer of Jungheera: A Metrical Tale and Other Poems (1828)
  - The Fakeer of Jungheera
  - "To India - My Native Land"
- The Poetical Works of Henry Louis Vivian Derozio, ed. B.B. Shah (1907)
  - "To the Pupils of the Hindu College"

== Influence ==
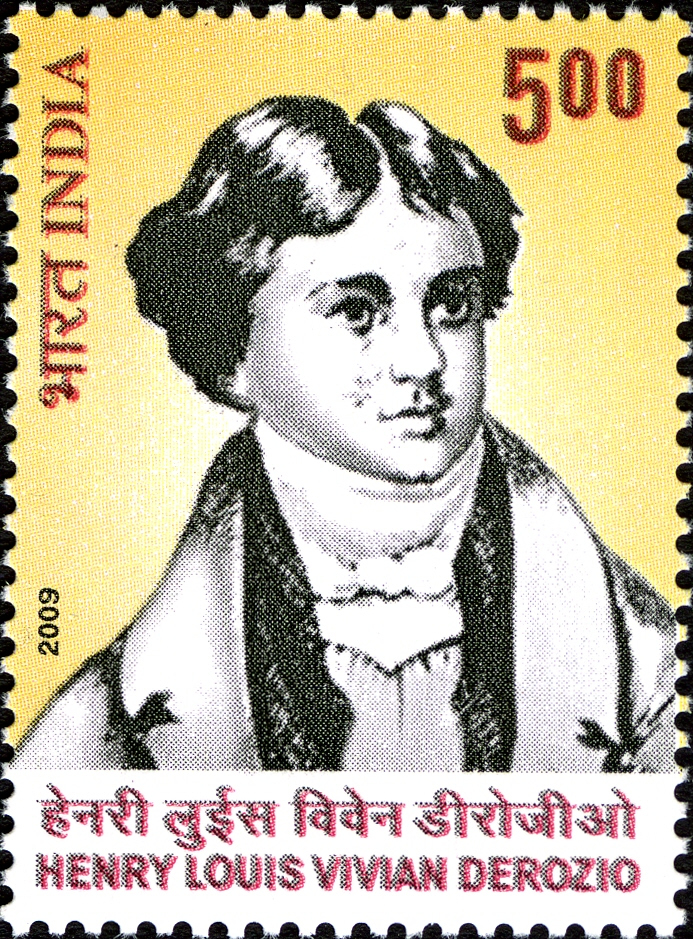
Commemorative stamp of Derozio issued in 2009

Derozio's ideas had a profound influence on the social movement that came to be known as the Bengal Renaissance in early 19th century Bengal, despite being viewed as something of an iconoclast by Alexander Duff and other (largely evangelical) Christian Missionaries. In Duff's Assembly's Institution, Derozio's ideas on the acceptance of the rational spirit were accepted, as long as they were not in conflict with basic tenets of Christianity, and as long as they critiqued orthodox Hinduism.

Derozio is generally believed to be partly responsible for the conversion of Hindus like Krishna Mohan Banerjee and Lal Behari Dey to Christianity. Samaren Roy, however, states that only three Hindu pupils among his first group of students became Christians, and asserts that Derozio had no role to play in their change of faith. He points out that Derozio's dismissal was sought not only by Hindus such as Ramkamal Sen, but also by Christians such as H. H. Wilson. Many other students like Tarachand Chakraborti became leaders in the Brahmo Samaj.

Derozio's political activities have also been seen as crucially important to the development of a public sphere in Calcutta during British rule.

A commemorative postage stamp of Derozio was issued on 15 December 2009.

== In popular culture ==
=== Films and television ===
- In 1988, Indian American Actor Tom Alter portrayed the role Henry Louis Vivian Derozio in the Indian television serial Bharat Ek Khoj produced and Directed by Shyam Benegal

== See also ==
- Young Bengal
- To India - My Native Land
