= Church of the New Dispensation =

19th century religious movement in India

The Church of the New Dispensation was a religious movement founded in the 19th century by Keshab Chunder Sen, characterized by its syncretic blend of Hindu, Christian, and other religious traditions, and its focus on direct, personal spiritual experience and social reform within the framework of Indian Brahmoism.

== History ==
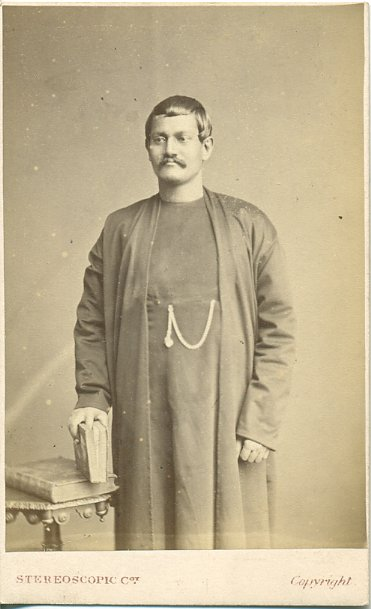
Keshub Chunder Sen, founder of the Church of the New Dispensation

The Church of the New Dispensation, emerging in the early 19th century, represented a significant reform movement within Indian Brahmoism. Initially, it focused on the Advaita Vedanta philosophy, emphasizing the profound relationship between man and the divine. Influenced by both Puritan self-examination practices and faculty psychology, the movement reflected a deep emphasis on self-awareness and spiritual introspection.

Keshab Chandra Sen, a central figure in the 19th-century Bengali reform movement, played a critical role in the sect's formation, advocating for what he termed a 'living religion'. His call for religious and social reform emphasized the importance of God-realization through inward focus, resonating with the educated middle class, particularly the Bhadralok, who were closely aligned with British colonizers. The sect's appeal lay in its progressive ideology that resonated with the educated elite's aspirations for social and religious reform.

A distinctive feature of the sect was its synthesis of various religious elements. Keshab Chandra Sen, driven by his ideology of salvation, sought a universal religion, combining culturally diverse religious practices from Hinduism, Christianity, Vaishnavism, Saktism, Buddhism, and Unitarianism. This eclectic approach, including the adoption of Vaishnava kirtan into Brahmo services, marked a profound shift from traditional Brahmoism towards a more inclusive and universalist stance. Under Keshab Chandra Sen's leadership, the sect established a distinct identity, focusing on individual realization of religious knowledge. Leadership roles within the sect were centered around delivering lectures and designing religious rites that catered to the spiritual needs of its predominantly middle-class followers.

The sect underwent significant shifts in focus and leadership under Sen's guidance. In 1878, a critical division occurred following the controversial marriage of Keshab's under-aged daughter to the prince of Cooch-Behar, a decision seen as violating both the Native Marriage Act and the Brahmo Samaj's principles. This event led to the formation of the Sadharan Brahmo Samaj and subsequently, Keshab reorganized his smaller group of supporters into the Church of the New Dispensation, which adopted a syncretistic and eclectic approach, incorporating Hindu and Christian features.

The Church of the New Dispensation was characterized by its synthesis of Western and Indian traditions. It emphasized individual self-cultivation and balanced development of faculties, advocating for a direct, personal encounter with the divine while rejecting the reliance on external religious authorities.

Later, the sect incorporated concepts from other religious movements, such as avataric evolutionism based on the writings of H.P. Blavatsky in 1882. Keshab Chandra Sen's progressive integration of Christian theology, particularly his views on Christ and the Trinity, marked a controversial yet forward-thinking approach within the sect.

Sen's charismatic leadership was pivotal in the early expansion of the sect, but his controversial decisions led to internal strife and divisions. Sivanath Sastri, a prominent figure in the Sadharan Samaj, emerged as a significant critic, challenging the theological and ideological directions taken by Sen. Sastri's efforts were central to the Brahmo Samaj's impact, promoting ideals such as rational theism, social reform, humanism, and political liberalism.

== Beliefs and practices ==
=== Doctrine ===
Sen introduced the concept of a 'living religion'. This doctrine stressed the importance of God-realization through inward focus and called for religious and social reform, resonating with the values of the educated middle class. Sen's teachings encouraged followers to actively engage in self-improvement and societal betterment, aligning spiritual growth with social responsibility.

Central to the sect's belief was the advocacy for a direct, personal encounter with the divine. This approach rejected the dependence on external religious authorities, emphasizing a more intimate and personal relationship with God. The sect promoted a duality of worshipper and worshipped, fostering a deeper understanding and connection with the divine.

The sect's doctrines reflected a unique synthesis of Eastern and Western religious elements, notably under Keshab Chandra Sen's leadership. He envisioned a universal religion combining diverse practices from different cultural and religious backgrounds, aiming to transcend sectarian and national boundaries in the pursuit of a more holistic spirituality.

=== Practices ===
In its rituals and ceremonies, the Brahmoist sect skillfully integrated elements from both Indian and Western religious traditions. Practices such as 'sadhu samagama' (pilgrimages to the saints) exemplified this blending, promoting a holistic approach to spiritual development that respected various cultural and religious backgrounds.

Adopting practices akin to Puritan and Unitarian traditions, the sect emphasized critical self-examination and personal development through the use of spiritual diaries and public accounts of personal behavior. These practices encouraged followers to reflect deeply on their spiritual journey and ethical conduct

The sect reinterpreted traditional Indian ceremonies in a universal context. For example, the Christian Eucharist was adapted to include Hindu symbols like rice and water, baptism was performed by invoking Varuna, and Vedic rituals like the fire ceremony were given new, universal meanings. This approach highlighted the sect's commitment to a more inclusive and broad understanding of spirituality.

Emphasizing the importance of symbols in spiritual practice, the sect incorporated dance as a form of worship, recognizing its cultural significance across various traditions. This practice demonstrated the sect's appreciation of diverse cultural expressions in religious practice.

The Church of the New Dispensation's rituals were eclectic, drawing from various religious traditions to create a unique spiritual experience for its followers. This eclecticism was a hallmark of the sect's approach to worship, reflecting its broader doctrine of universalism and synthesis of religious practices.

The Church of the New Dispensation also adopted many Hindu practices, such as referring to God as "Mother" and reinstituting idolatry, a practice that had been abolished in Brahmoism.

=== Sacred Texts ===
The Brahmoist sect curated an eclectic collection of sacred writings, drawing from diverse religious traditions. This included texts from Hinduism, Christianity, and other global religious scriptures, reflecting the sect's commitment to a universal religious perspective. These texts were revered not just for their religious significance but also for their philosophical depth and ethical teachings. A key feature of the sect's approach to sacred texts was the emphasis on comparative religious study. This involved deep scholarly analysis and intuitive engagement with texts from various religions, fostering a broad understanding of spiritual and moral principles.

=== Comparison with Mainstream Brahmoism ===
While mainstream Brahmoism focused on a form of monotheistic worship and rationalism, the Brahmoist sect under Keshab Chandra Sen diverged by integrating a broader range of religious and philosophical ideas. This included elements from Eastern and Western religious traditions, creating a more eclectic and inclusive approach to spirituality.

In terms of rituals and ceremonies, the sect deviated from mainstream Brahmoism's simpler, iconoclastic practices. It incorporated more elaborate rituals, drawing from various religious customs, and even reintroduced the use of images and symbols, which mainstream Brahmoism had moved away from.

Theologically, the sect was more experimental, particularly under Keshab Chandra Sen's leadership. It explored concepts like the Trinity and Christ's divinity, which were not typical of mainstream Brahmoism. These explorations sometimes led to accusations of heresy from more traditional Brahmo circles.

Both mainstream Brahmoism and the sect shared a commitment to social reform, but the sect tended to combine these efforts with more radical religious innovations. This sometimes led to internal conflicts and divisions within the broader Brahmo community.

== Influence on Indian society ==
The Church of the New Dispensation, under Sen's leadership, significantly impacted Indian society through its progressive social reforms. Advocating for issues such as women's rights and education reform, the church aligned with the broader aspirations of the educated middle class in Bengal. This advocacy reflected the church's commitment to societal change, transcending traditional religious boundaries.

The church's reformist and progressive stance contributed significantly to the Bengal Renaissance, a period marked by social, cultural, and intellectual awakening. Through its teachings and practices, the church played a crucial role in shaping contemporary social values and contributing to this broader movement of rejuvenation during the 19th century.

== Ecumenical relations ==
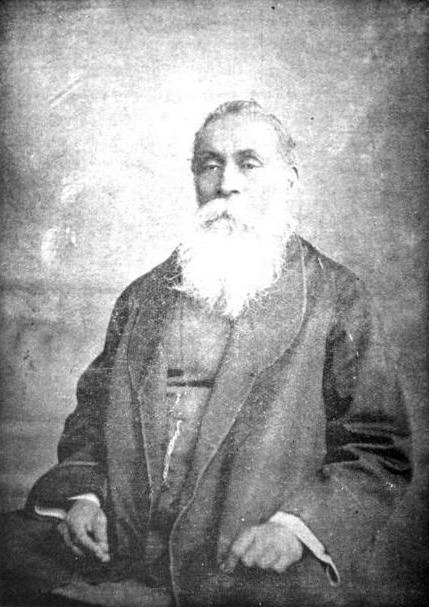
Protap Chunder Mozoomdar, professor of Christianity

The Church of the New Dispensation was known for its ecumenical approach, actively engaging with various religious traditions to foster interfaith understanding and dialogue. This inclusive attitude was a hallmark of Keshab Chandra Sen's leadership, reflecting the church's commitment to a universal religious perspective.

The church emphasized comparative religious studies, encouraging a deeper appreciation of different religious philosophies. This approach facilitated mutual respect and learning among different faith communities, contributing to a climate of interfaith dialogue. Sen appointed four people as "professors" to conduct an academic study of various religions: Gour Govind Roy for Hinduism, Protap Chunder Mozoomdar for Christianity, Girish Chunder Sen for Islam, and Aghorenath Gupta for Buddhism. In the pursuit of the academic study of religions other than their own, all the professors utilized a two-approach, a scholarly criticism with intuitive sympathy, which can be seen as a precursor to the phenomenological approach.

The church's unorthodox practices and beliefs sometimes led to tensions and criticisms from more traditional religious factions. Its syncretic and eclectic approach, while progressive, occasionally faced resistance from orthodox Hinduism and other religions.

== Opposition ==
The Church of the New Dispensation faced resistance from orthodox religious groups, particularly within Hinduism, due to its syncretic practices and departure from traditional religious norms. This opposition was a significant external challenge, impacting the church's ability to expand its influence.

The church's progressive stance on social issues, including women's rights and education, often drew criticism from more conservative elements in mainstream society. This external pressure sometimes hindered the church's efforts in social reform.

== Decline ==
The Church of the New Dispensation faced significant internal challenges, particularly in terms of leadership disputes and doctrinal differences following Keshab Chandra Sen's death. Disagreements over religious practices and the direction of the church led to internal strife and weakened its cohesive structure. The struggle for succession after Sen's death further exacerbated internal conflicts. Different factions within the church vied for leadership, leading to fragmentation and weakening the church's influence.

The decline of the Church of the New Dispensation was marked by internal conflicts and leadership challenges. After Keshab Chandra Sen's death in 1884, the church faced difficulties in maintaining unity and coherent leadership. Keshab's charismatic leadership had been a unifying force, but his absence led to divisions within the church and skepticism from various quarters, including traditional Brahmos and others within the religious and intellectual community.

The actual number of Brahmos remained relatively small, primarily comprising middle-class professionals and their families. Despite the establishment of new branches post-1880, these were mostly aligned with the Sadharan faction, indicating a decline in support for Keshab's approach. The 1891 census reported only 3,051 Brahmos in South Asia, reflecting the limited numerical growth and influence of the church.

Despite the decline, the church's philosophy of eclecticism continued to influence the personalities, lives, and consciousnesses of representative 20th-century Indians, contributing to the shaping of the modern Indian mind. However, the church struggled to maintain its initial momentum and unity in the years following Keshab's death, eventually leading to its dissolution as a significant religious movement.

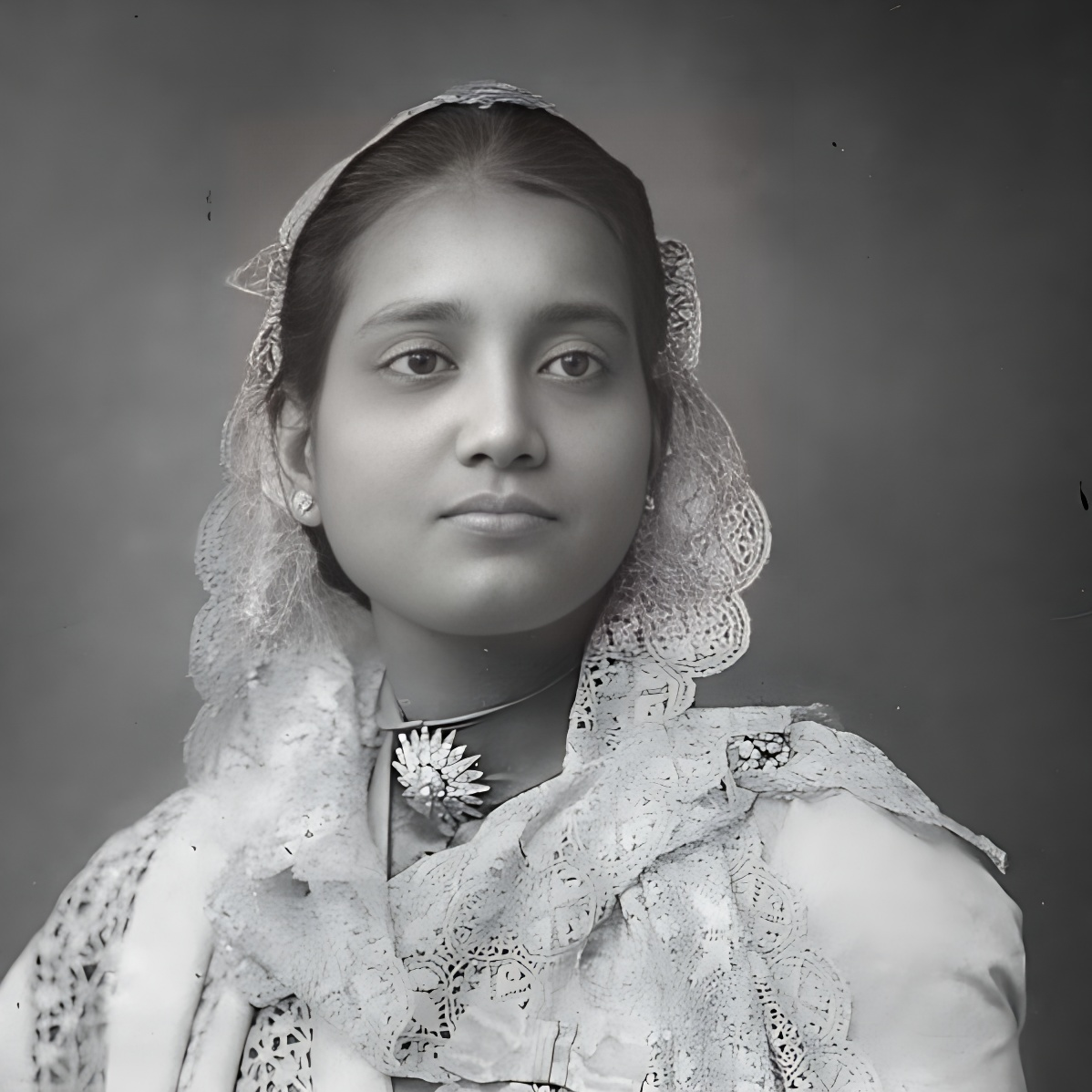
Suniti Devi, daughter of Keshub Chunder Sen

== Remnants and Revivals ==
King Nripendra and his wife, Suniti Devi, constructed the largest Brahmo temple in South Asia, primarily funded with government money, and provided an annual grant of 5,000 rupees for maintenance. In 1888, the king declared that the Church of the New Dispensation was the official state religion, though it had no practical effect in spreading the faith outside the small community of Bengali elite.
