= Indian Reform Association =

The Indian Reform Association was formed on 29 October 1870 with Keshub Chandra Sen as president. It represented the secular side of the Brahmo Samaj and included many who did not belong to the Brahmo Samaj. The objective was to put into practice some of the ideas Sen was exposed to during his visit to United Kingdom.

David Kopf says that Sen was enthusiastic about the Unitarian social gospel, which he observed first hand during his trip abroad. He seemed convinced that the reform efforts he witnessed in Britain could be duplicated in India. The Indian Reform Association was formed to promote "the social and moral reformation of the natives of India".

The comprehensive objective of the Association was to be served through five departments of activity – cheap literature, female improvement, education, temperance, and charity.

== Cheap literature ==
The object of cheap literature was to disseminate useful scientific information amongst the masses through cheap journals and the publication of cheap and useful tracts. On 16 November 1870, the Indian Reforms Association started publishing a weekly newspaper, Sulava Samachar in Bengala, priced only one paisa. It was the first of its kind in India in the line of journalistic venture. Until then the humbler classes had never handled a newspaper and they were for the first time brought in contact with events that were taking place around them. Protap Chunder Mozoomdar noted, "The novelty and success of the newspaper stimulated repeated imitation."

== Female improvement ==
Female normal school was started in February 1871 under the auspices of the female improvement section for adult ladies who wanted to be taught or to learn how to teach. Subsequently, a girls’ school was attached wherein the adult students of the normal school could learn and practice the art of teaching. A carefully devised syllabus laid stress on womanly virtues and accomplishments.

Bamabodhini Patrika meant for women had been established earlier in 1864. The women of the normal school started the Bamahitaishiny Sabha (Society for the Welfare of Women) for mutual improvement and discussions of matters of common interest. Once the Sabha started, its proceedings were reflected in Bamabodhini Patrika. In the course of time the school was replaced by the Victoria Institution.

== Education ==
The third section dealing with education undertook to educate the labouring classes, and to instruct the middle classes in industrial arts. The Working Men’s Institution and the Industrial School were opened on 28 November 1870. In addition to education, the Institution provided healthy entertainment opportunities. The Industrial School gave instruction to the middle class in industrial arts, or rather practical training in such crafts as carpentry, tailoring, clock and watch repairing, printing, lithography and engraving. Brahmo missionaries, headed by Sen himself took to these occupations with workman-like avidity. The present Working Men’s Institution may well be regarded as the descendant of this Institution.

== Temperance ==
When Peary Charan Sarkar first raised the standard of temperance, Sen had lent his support. Indeed, the subject was of long-standing interest to him. Indian Reform Association published a monthly Bengali journal ‘’Mad na Garal’’(Wine or Poison) under the editorial management of Sivanath Sastri. After the collapse of the Indian Reform Association, Sen had formed an organisation of youth called Band of Hope.

== Charity ==
The social activities of this group under Vijay Krishna Goswami, won universal admiration. They started off with medical assistance to those suffering from epidemic malaria.
