= Hare School =

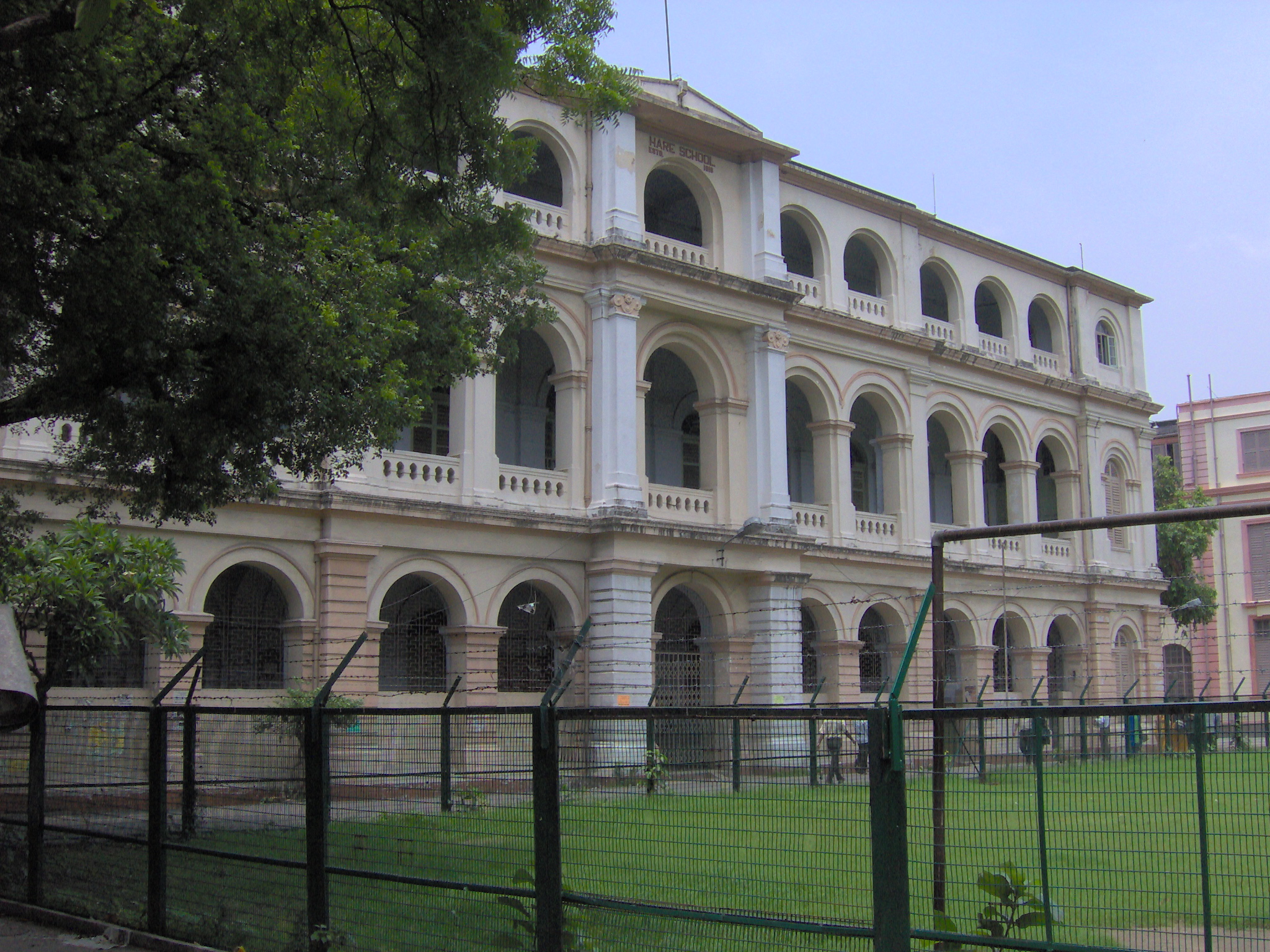

Location
- 87, College Street; Kolkata, West Bengal, 700 073; India; 22°34′32.54″N 88°21′38.75″E

Information
- Type: Government school
- Motto: তমসো মা জ্যোতির্গময়ঃ (illumine the darkness)
- Religious affiliation: Secular
- Established: September 1, 1818; 208 years ago
- Founder: David Hare
- Status: Active
- Locale: College Street
- School board: WBBSE & WBCHSE
- Authority: Government of West Bengal
- Category: Higher Secondary
- Chairman: Governor of West Bengal
- Principal: Jayanta Bhattacharya
- Faculty: 50
- Teaching staff: 42
- Grades: I to Xll
- Years offered: 200
- Gender: Boys' only
- Age range: 5 to 18 years
- Enrollment: 1320 (approximate intake)
- Language: Bengali, English
- Campus: Urban
- Affiliations: West Bengal Board of Secondary Education; West Bengal Council of Higher Secondary Education

Hare School is one of the oldest schools in Kolkata, India, teaching grades one to twelve under the West Bengal Board of Secondary Education and the West Bengal Council of Higher Secondary Education. It is a state government-administered boys school and was established by the Scottish watch-maker, David Hare. The establishment date is not agreed upon, but the official year of establishment is 1818. Thus the school is declared as the oldest western type school in Asia. The school is situated opposite the Presidency University, and is also adjacent to the University of Calcutta and Hindu School. The combined campuses of the Hare School and Presidency College is one of the largest in Kolkata.

== History ==
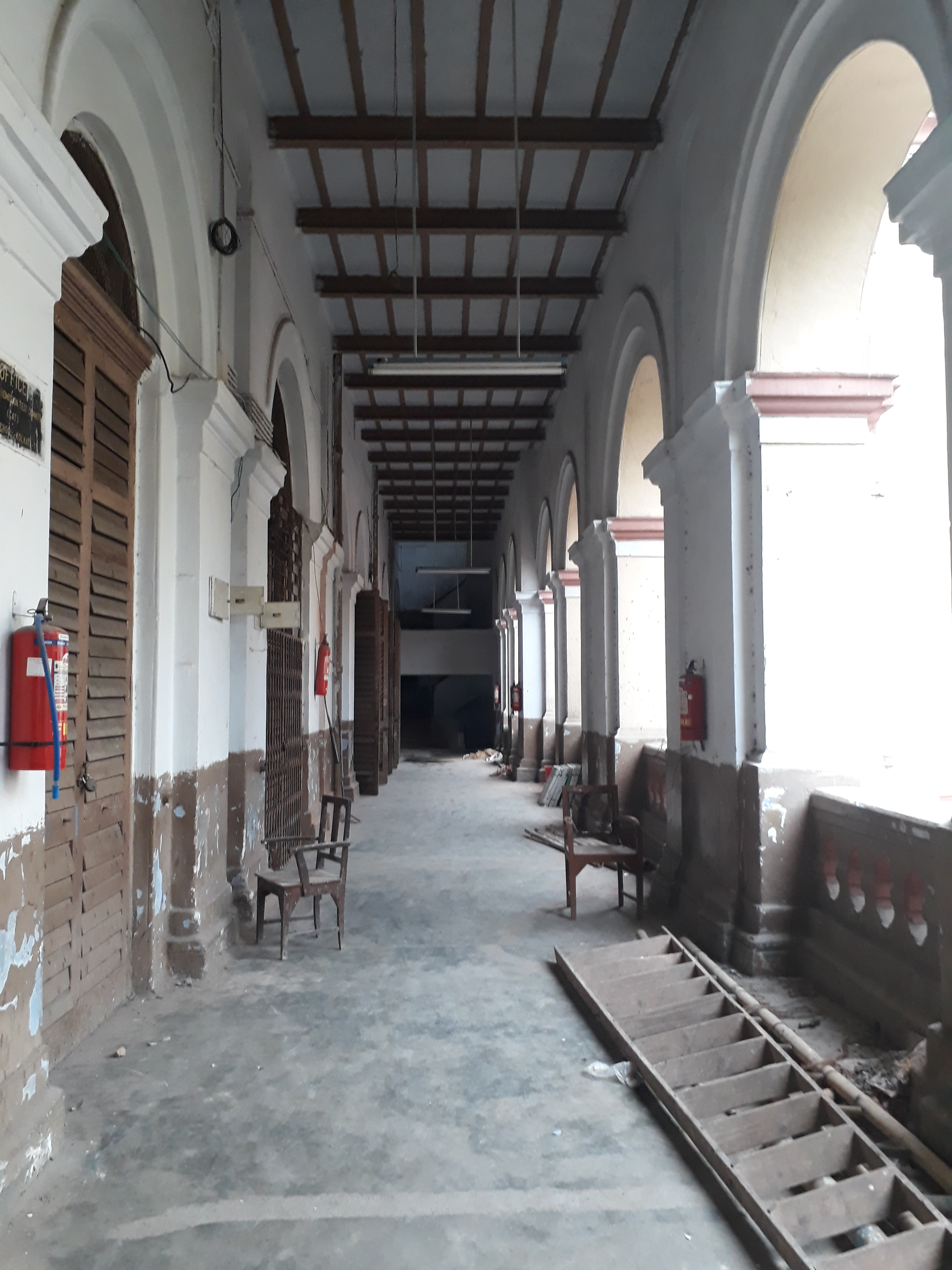
Inside the Hare school building

David Hare established the school in 1818, opposite Hindu College, in the heart of College Street after establishing the Calcutta School-Book Society, and the Hindu College, in 1817, and the Calcutta School Society in 1818. The school started with the name "Arpuli Pathshala" and later as Colootala Branch School, finally it was renamed Hare School in 1867.

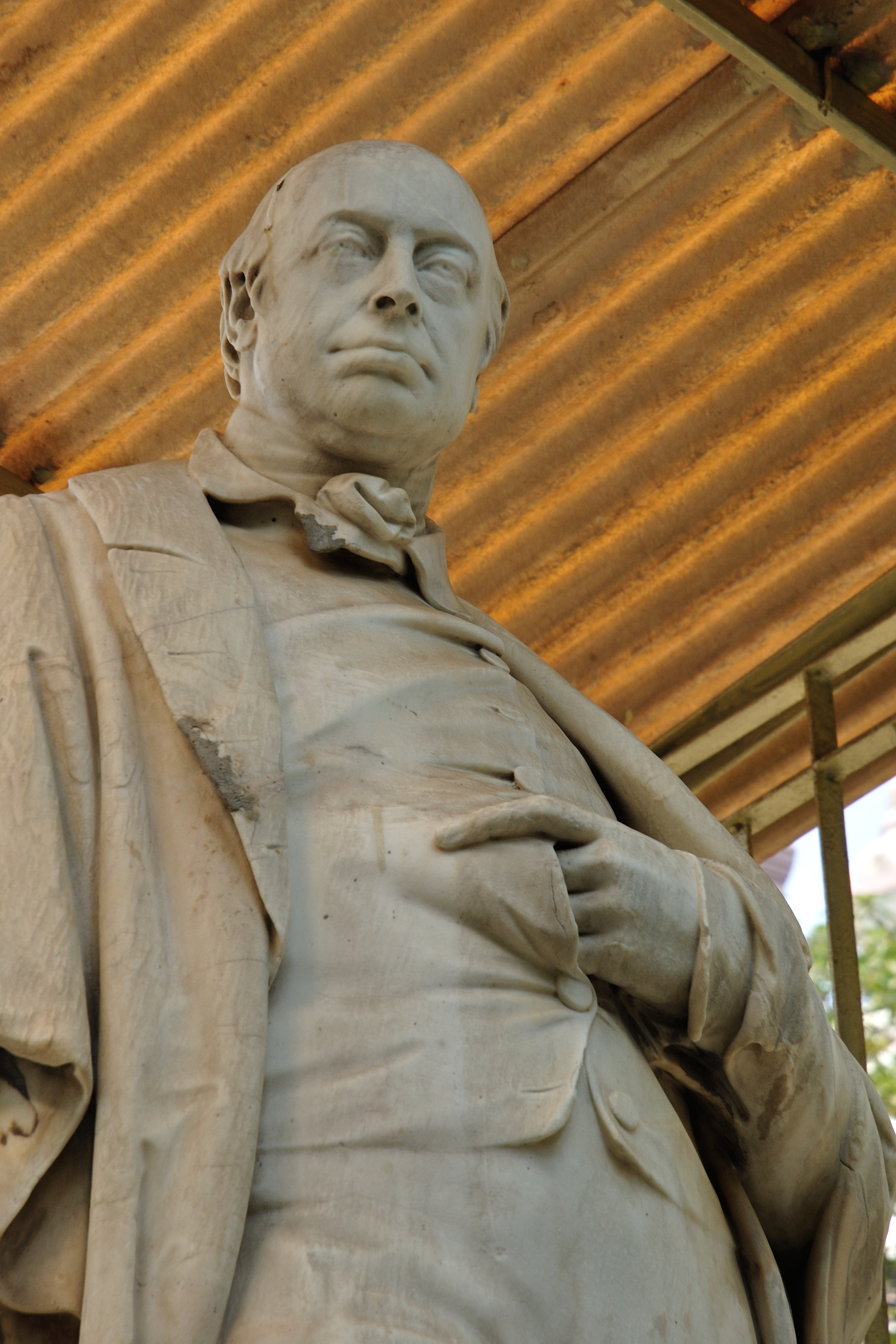
A statue of David Hare at the school

== Notable alumni ==
- Jayanto Nath Chaudhuri — former Chief of the Army Staff
- Krishna Mohan Banerjee—educationist, linguist and Christian Missionary (1822–1824)
- Rajnarayan Basu — writer, intellectual, and social reformer
- Girish Chandra Ghosh, playwright, theatre director and thespian
- Jagdish Chandra Bose — scientist. His work includes crescograph to prove life in trees, the first proof of radio waves.
- Akshay Kumar Baral — poet
- Dibyendu Barua— chess grandmaster
- Pramathesh Barua — actor and director
- Brajendranath De, I.C.S., — civilian and historian
- Guru Dutt, actor, director
- Romesh Chunder Dutt — civil servant, economist, historian, poet, translator of Vedas
- Ramtanu Lahiri — researcher on Bengali language, member of the Young Bengal group (1826–1828)
- Dinabandhu Mitra — Bengali writer of British India, works include Neel Darpan
- Prafulla Chandra Roy — Scientist/chemist: worked on various mercury compounds & founder of Bengal Chemical
- Nagendra Prasad Sarbadikari — father of Indian football
- Peary Charan Sarkar — social reformer and writer
- Radhanath Sikdar — mathematician, the first person to calculate the height of Mount Everest
- Mukur Kanti Khisa - Indian Diplomat (Ambassador of India to Argentina, Chile), the first Chakma person in Indian Foreign Service (IFS) Rank-8th in All India, 27th in IAS Exam.
- Meghnad Saha — inventor of the theory of thermal ionization
- Digambar Mitra — First Bengali Sheriff of Kolkata
- Mahendralal Sarkar — Doctor, social reformer, founder of Indian Association for the Cultivation of Science
- Romesh Chandra Mitra — Judge, Calcutta High Court
- Protap Chunder Mozoomdar — leader of Brahmo Samaj
- Jatindra Mohan Sengupta - Barrister, freedom fighter and politician
- Kalikrishna Mitra — Social reformer and educator
- Swami Saradananda — (Saratchandra Chakrabarty) Direct disciple of Sri Ramakrishna — Author of Sri Ramkrishna Lilaprsanga
- Swami Vijnanananda — (Hariprasanna Chattopadhyaya) Direct disciple of Sri Ramakrishna
- Mahendranath Gupta — (Author of Sri Sri Ramkrishna Kathamrita)
- Ashrafuddin Ahmad Chowdhury — former general secretary of the Congress Party
- Ziaur Rahman — Bir Uttom, freedom fighter, and President of Bangladesh 1977–1981
- Manomohan Bose — Bengali journalist, playwright and writer
- Sisir Kumar Ghosh, Editor
- Manmatha Nath Roy Chowdhury, Raja of Santosh

== See also ==
- List of schools in Kolkata
