= Barasat =

City in West Bengal, India

- City
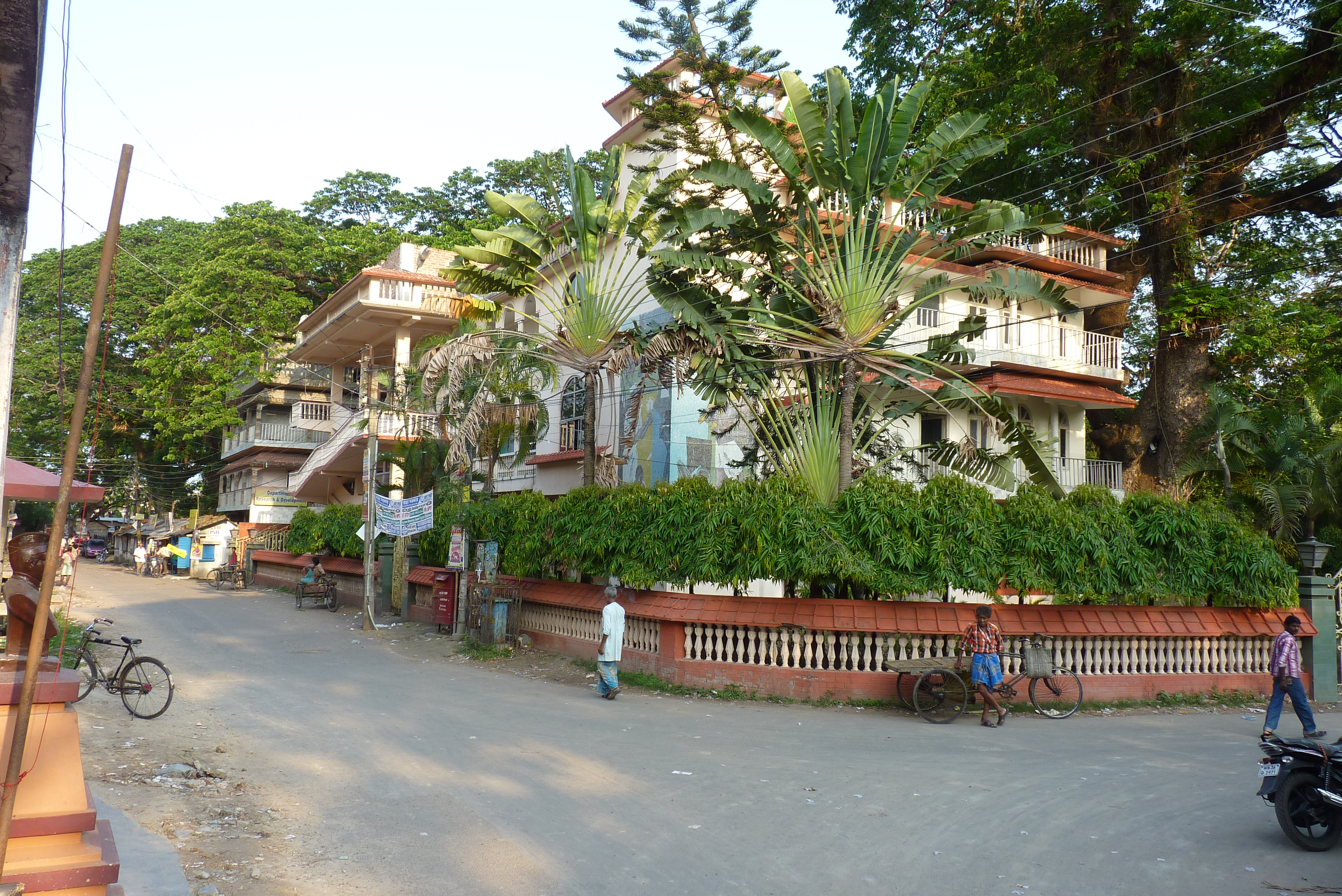
- Streets of Barasat

- Location in West Bengal, India Barasat (India)
- Coordinates: 22.72°N 88.48°E
- Country: India
- State: West Bengal
- Division: Presidency
- District: North 24 parganas

Government
  - Type: Municipality
  - Body: Barasat Municipality
  - Chairman: Asani Mukhopadhyay
  - MP: Kakali Ghosh Dastidar
  - MLA: Shankar Chatterjee

Area
  - Total: 34.06 km^{2} (13.15 sq mi)
- Elevation: 11 m (36 ft)

Population (2011)
  - Total: 278,435
  - Density: 8,175/km^{2} (21,170/sq mi)

Languages
  - Official: Bengali, English
- Time zone: UTC+5:30 (IST)
- PIN: 700124, 700125, 700126, 700127
- Telephone code: +91 (0) 33
- Vehicle registration: WB-25, WB-26
- Lok Sabha constituency: Barasat
- Vidhan Sabha constituency: Barasat
- Website: north24parganas.nic.in barasatmunicipality.org

Barasat is a city , Sub - Division , and a municipality of North 24 Parganas district in the Indian state of West Bengal. It is the headquarters of Barasat Sadar subdivision. It is a part of the area covered by Kolkata Metropolitan Development Authority (KMDA).

== History ==
During the Mughal Empire period, Sankar Chakraborty (a commander of the zamindar Pratapaditya and king of Jessore in present-day Bangladesh) came to Barasat, Kolkata in 1600 and established himself. In 1700, Hazarat Ekdil Shah moved to the town and was known as a social reformer. His tomb, in Kazipara, is a pilgrimage site for the Muslim community. Pratapaditya made his way to Kolkata from Jessore; Sirajudullah went to Kolkata from Murshidabad via Barasat on a road which became two national highways.

Under the British Raj, East India Company officials from Calcutta (Kolkata) made Barasat a weekend retreat and built houses with gardens. Warren Hastings built his villa in the heart of Barasat and Bankim Chandra Chatterjee was the town's first Indian deputy magistrate.

Indigo cultivation was a major industry and indigo merchants were known for their inhumane treatment of farmers. Titumir, a farmer, fomented a revolution against indigo merchants in Barasat. Iswar Chandra Vidyasagar, Pyari Charan Sarkar and Kalikrishna Mitra were known for social reformation in the town, including women's education and widow remarriage. During the early nineteenth century, Barasat Cadet College trained new recruits and cadets from Europe; the college closed in 1811.

From 1834 to 1861, Barasat was the seat of Barasat District. The district became a subdivision of the Twenty-four Parganas district in 1861, and Barasat is the headquarters of North 24 Parganas district.

== Geography ==
Cities, towns and locations in Barasat subdivision, North 24 Parganas
M: municipal town, CT: census town, R: rural/ urban centre, H: historical centre
Owing to space constraints in the small map, the actual locations in a larger map may vary slightly

=== Location ===
Barasat is located in eastern India's Ganges Delta. The Bangladesh border, at Petrapole, is 70–80 kilometres (43–50 mi) from the city.

Its average elevation is 11 metres (36 ft). The nearest river is the Ganges, about 15 kilometres (9.3 mi) to the west, and it is on the Gangetic plain.

=== Area overview ===
The area covered in the map alongside is largely a part of the north Bidyadhari Plain, located in the lower Ganges Delta. The area is flat. It is a little raised above flood level and the highest ground borders the river channels. 54.67% of the people of the densely populated area lives in the urban areas and 45.33% lives in the rural areas.

Note: The map alongside presents some of the notable locations in the subdivision. All places marked in the map are linked in the larger full screen map.

=== Climate ===
Barasat has a tropical climate similar to the rest West Bengal. The region experiences a monsoon from early June to mid-September. The climate is dry in winter (mid-November to mid-February) and humid in summer. January is the coldest month and May is the hottest month in Barasat. Months of July and August produces most rainfall in Barasat.

Climate data for Kolkata (Alipore) 1991–2020 normals, extremes 1901–present
Month	Jan	Feb	Mar	Apr	May	Jun	Jul	Aug	Sep	Oct	Nov	Dec	Year
Record high °C (°F)	32.8 (91.0)	38.4 (101.1)	41.1 (106.0)	43.3 (109.9)	43.7 (110.7)	43.9 (111.0)	39.9 (103.8)	38.4 (101.1)	38.9 (102.0)	39.0 (102.2)	34.9 (94.8)	32.5 (90.5)	43.9 (111.0)
Mean maximum °C (°F)	29.8 (85.6)	33.9 (93.0)	37.5 (99.5)	38.8 (101.8)	39.0 (102.2)	37.8 (100.0)	36.0 (96.8)	35.3 (95.5)	35.5 (95.9)	35.3 (95.5)	33.1 (91.6)	30.0 (86.0)	39.8 (103.6)
Mean daily maximum °C (°F)	25.5 (77.9)	29.4 (84.9)	33.7 (92.7)	35.4 (95.7)	35.5 (95.9)	34.1 (93.4)	32.5 (90.5)	32.3 (90.1)	32.6 (90.7)	32.3 (90.1)	30.2 (86.4)	26.7 (80.1)	31.7 (89.1)
Daily mean °C (°F)	19.9 (67.8)	23.8 (74.8)	28.2 (82.8)	30.6 (87.1)	31.2 (88.2)	30.6 (87.1)	29.5 (85.1)	29.4 (84.9)	29.4 (84.9)	28.3 (82.9)	25.1 (77.2)	21.1 (70.0)	27.3 (81.1)
Mean daily minimum °C (°F)	14.3 (57.7)	18.1 (64.6)	22.9 (73.2)	25.7 (78.3)	26.8 (80.2)	27.1 (80.8)	26.7 (80.1)	26.6 (79.9)	26.3 (79.3)	24.4 (75.9)	20.1 (68.2)	15.5 (59.9)	22.9 (73.2)
Mean minimum °C (°F)	10.9 (51.6)	12.4 (54.3)	18.2 (64.8)	21.1 (70.0)	21.8 (71.2)	23.9 (75.0)	24.3 (75.7)	24.6 (76.3)	23.9 (75.0)	20.9 (69.6)	16.9 (62.4)	11.9 (53.4)	10.0 (50.0)
Record low °C (°F)	6.7 (44.1)	7.2 (45.0)	10.0 (50.0)	16.1 (61.0)	17.9 (64.2)	20.4 (68.7)	20.6 (69.1)	22.6 (72.7)	20.6 (69.1)	17.2 (63.0)	10.6 (51.1)	7.2 (45.0)	6.7 (44.1)
Average rainfall mm (inches)	15.4 (0.61)	24.6 (0.97)	36.8 (1.45)	55.0 (2.17)	118.5 (4.67)	276.7 (10.89)	371.6 (14.63)	372.1 (14.65)	325.0 (12.80)	179.6 (7.07)	32.6 (1.28)	5.6 (0.22)	1,813.3 (71.39)
Average rainy days	1.1	1.5	2.1	3.2	6.2	12.6	17.5	16.8	13.6	7.4	1.4	0.7	84.2
Average relative humidity (%) (at 17:30 IST)	62	55	51	61	68	77	82	83	82	76	68	65	69
Mean monthly sunshine hours	213.9	211.9	229.4	240.0	232.5	135.0	105.4	117.8	126.0	201.5	216.0	204.6	2,234
Mean daily sunshine hours	6.9	7.5	7.4	8.0	7.5	4.5	3.4	3.8	4.2	6.5	7.2	6.6	6.1
Average ultraviolet index	7	9	11	12	12	12	12	12	11	9	7	6	10
Source 1: India Meteorological Department (sun 1971–2000) Weather Atlas
Source 2: Tokyo Climate Center (mean temperatures 1991–2020)

Climate data for Kolkata (Dumdum Airport) 1991–2020 normals, extremes 1939–2020
Month	Jan	Feb	Mar	Apr	May	Jun	Jul	Aug	Sep	Oct	Nov	Dec	Year
Record high °C (°F)	32.5 (90.5)	37.3 (99.1)	40.6 (105.1)	42.8 (109.0)	43.1 (109.6)	43.7 (110.7)	39.2 (102.6)	37.7 (99.9)	37.5 (99.5)	36.8 (98.2)	36.0 (96.8)	33.0 (91.4)	43.7 (110.7)
Mean daily maximum °C (°F)	25.3 (77.5)	29.2 (84.6)	33.6 (92.5)	35.9 (96.6)	36.1 (97.0)	34.8 (94.6)	33.2 (91.8)	33.0 (91.4)	33.3 (91.9)	32.5 (90.5)	30.1 (86.2)	26.6 (79.9)	32.0 (89.6)
Daily mean °C (°F)	18.8 (65.8)	22.9 (73.2)	27.4 (81.3)	30.1 (86.2)	30.6 (87.1)	30.3 (86.5)	29.5 (85.1)	29.3 (84.7)	29.3 (84.7)	27.9 (82.2)	24.3 (75.7)	20.1 (68.2)	26.7 (80.1)
Mean daily minimum °C (°F)	12.9 (55.2)	16.9 (62.4)	21.9 (71.4)	25.2 (77.4)	26.2 (79.2)	26.8 (80.2)	26.6 (79.9)	26.5 (79.7)	26.2 (79.2)	24.1 (75.4)	19.3 (66.7)	14.3 (57.7)	22.2 (72.0)
Record low °C (°F)	5.0 (41.0)	6.1 (43.0)	12.1 (53.8)	16.6 (61.9)	17.6 (63.7)	19.2 (66.6)	20.1 (68.2)	21.1 (70.0)	21.7 (71.1)	15.7 (60.3)	11.7 (53.1)	6.1 (43.0)	5.0 (41.0)
Average rainfall mm (inches)	15.8 (0.62)	20.2 (0.80)	31.9 (1.26)	53.4 (2.10)	140.5 (5.53)	247.5 (9.74)	366.5 (14.43)	355.4 (13.99)	282.1 (11.11)	170.2 (6.70)	21.3 (0.84)	6.8 (0.27)	1,711.5 (67.38)
Average rainy days	1.1	1.4	2.3	3.5	6.6	12.4	17.6	17.1	13.0	7.1	1.1	0.7	83.8
Average relative humidity (%) (at 08:30 IST)	61	53	49	58	66	76	81	82	81	75	67	66	68
Source 1: India Meteorological Department
Source 2: Tokyo Climate Center (mean temperatures 1991–2020)

Barasat has a tropical climate similar to the rest West Bengal. The region experiences a monsoon from early June to mid-September. The climate is dry in winter (mid-November to mid-February) and humid in summer. January is the coldest month and May is the hottest month in Barasat. Months of July and August produces most rainfall in Barasat.

== Demographics ==
Historical population
Year	Pop.	±%
1901	8,634	—
1911	8,790	+1.8%
1921	8,211	−6.6%
1931	8,672	+5.6%
1941	11,230	+29.5%
1951	16,027	+42.7%
1961	43,138	+169.2%
1971	64,097	+48.6%
1981	101,395	+58.2%
1991	160,044	+57.8%
2001	231,521	+44.7%
2011	278,435	+20.3%
Source: Government of India

Religion in Barasat municipality (2011)
Religion	Percent
Hinduism	87.23%
Islam	11.98%
Others	0.79%

According to the 2011 Indian census, Barasat had a total population of 278,435; 140,822 (51%) were males and 137,613 (49%) females, and 22,605 were under age six. The literacy rate was 89.62 percent of the population over age six (229,279 people). The town's population increased from 231,521 in 2001. The literacy rate that year was 76 percent, higher than the national average of 54.5 percent. Of the literate population, 52 percent were male and 48 percent female. Barasat was part of the Kolkata Urban Agglomeration in the 2011 census.

Languages of Barasat (2011)
1. Bengali (97.6%)
2. Hindi (1.82%)
3. Others (0.54%)

According to the 2011 census, 97.64% of the population spoke Bengali and 1.82% Hindi as their first language.

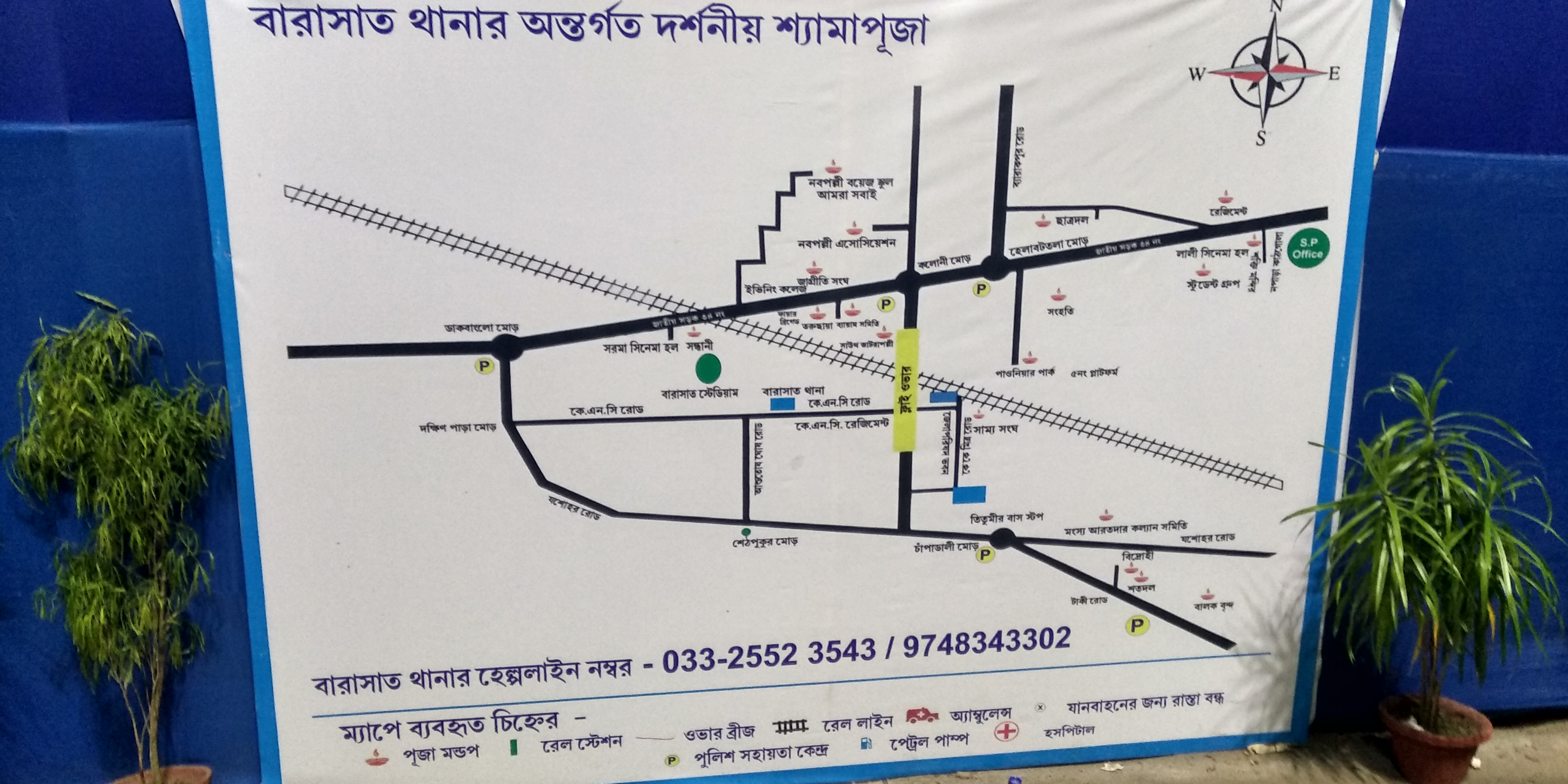
Guide map of some famous Kali Puja in Barasat

== Economy ==
Cotton weaving is Barasat's major industry, and the town is a trade centre for rice, legumes, sugarcane, potatoes, and coconuts. Now it is becoming a shopping destination with various malls including all major brands and multiplexes.

About 32,00,000 people commute daily from around the city to Barasat. Fifty-eight trains transport commuters from 24 stations in the town's Sealdah-Bangaon section and 32 trains carry commuters from 30 stations in the Sealdah-Hasnabad section. Barasat is well connected with Bongaon, Basirhat and Habra by train.

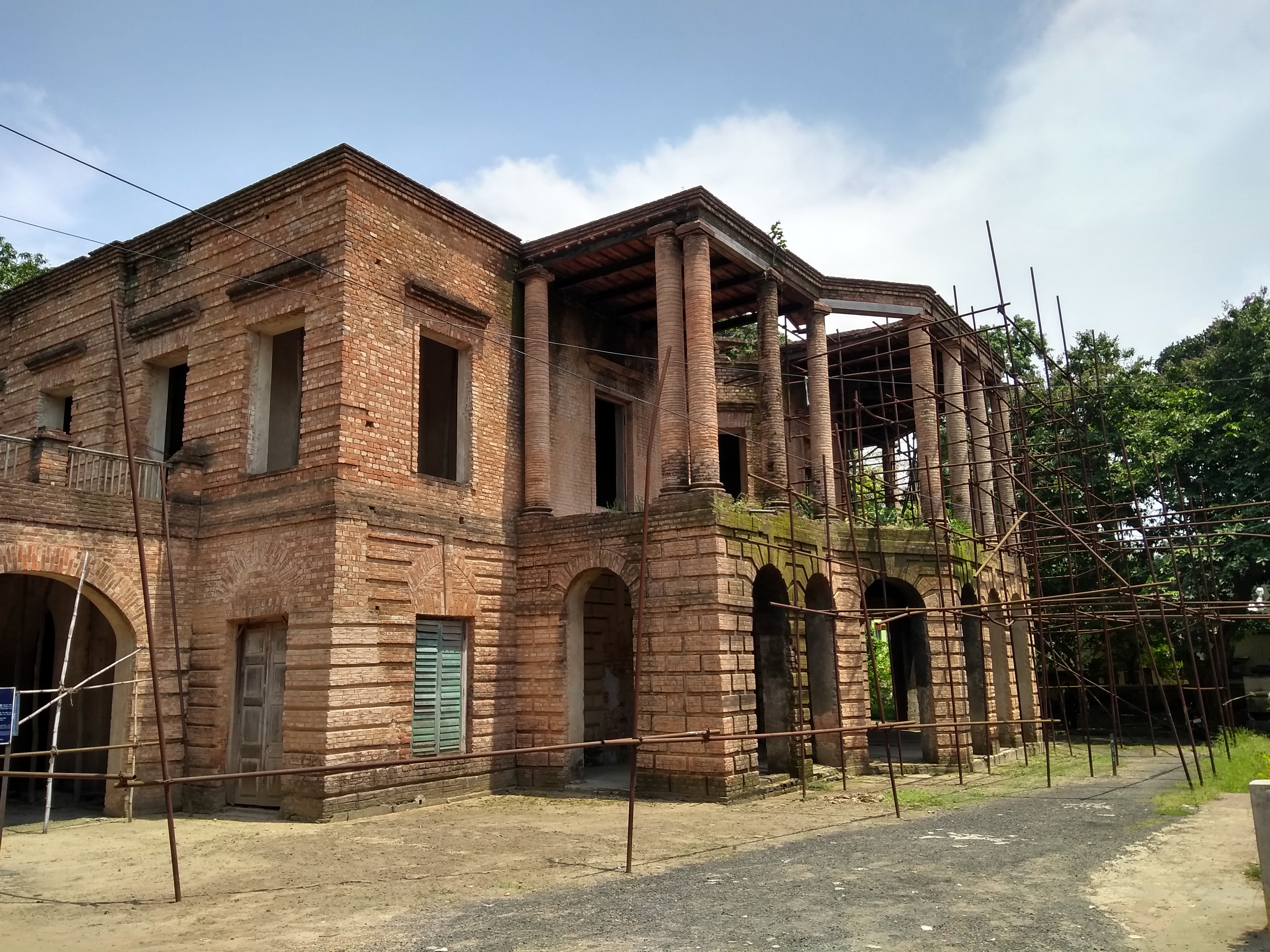
House of Warren Hastings, Barasat

== Transport ==
NH 12 (previously NH 34) running from Dalkhola to Bakkhali, locally popular as Jessore Road, passes through Barasat. Barrackpore-Barasat Road (part of SH 2) goes up to Barrackpore via Nilganj. Many buses ply along these roads.

=== WBTC Bus ===
- EB-12 Barasat - Karunamoyee
- ACT-4 Barasat - Karunamoyee
- AC-37 Barasat - Garia
- D-10 Barasat - Amtala via NewTown & Joka
- DS-34 Barrackpore - Barasat
- AC-2 Barasat - Howrah Stn
- D-37 Barasat - Baruipur
- C-29 Barasat - Barrackpore Court
- C-42 Barasat - Howrah Stn

=== Private Bus ===
- L238 Barasat - Howrah Stn
- DN-9/1 Barasat - Dakshineswar
- 79B Barasat - Bagbazar
- DN-2 Barasat - Dakshineswar
- DN-5 Barasat - Naihati
- 81 Barasat - Fishery Gate
- 81/1 Barasat - Rajchandrapur
- 16/1 Barasat - Dhamakhali
- Barasat - Garia Bus
- Barasat - Baruipur Bus
- Barasat - Botanical Garden Bus
- Barasat - Santragachi(via New Town) Bus
- Barasat - Santragachi(via VIP Road) Bus
- Barasat - Dankuni Housing Bus
- DN-47 Barasat - Karunamoyee
- DN-43 Barasat - Dakshineswar
- 87 Barasat - Jaguli
- 87A Barasat to Naihati

== Administration ==
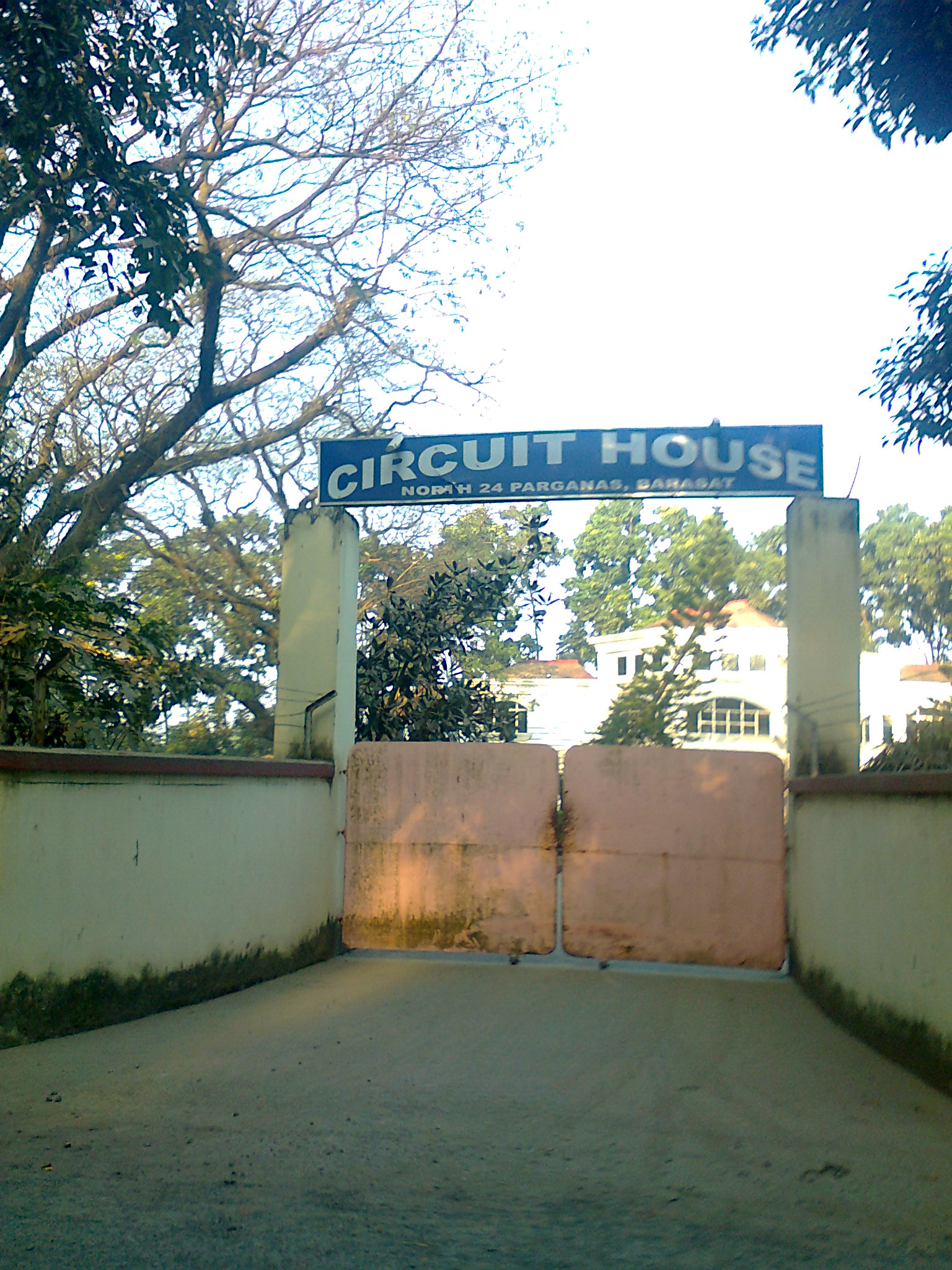
Front gate of Barasat Circuit House, a government guest house

Although Barasat Municipality was established on 1 April 1869, it had no independent existence until 1882. It was controlled by the magistrate office (and its magistrate), without a chairman. In 1882, Barasat Municipality was formed and a local government was created. Barasat Association, a citizen organization, donated land for the construction of municipal buildings.

Barasat is divided into 29 mouzas. There were originally four wards, later increasing to 18. After surrounding panchayats were incorporated in 1995, the number of wards increased to 32. In 2015, before the municipal election, the number of wards increased to 35. Barasat is part of the Kolkata Metropolitan Area, for which the KMDA is the statutory planning and development authority. The KMDA manages the area's infrastructure development.

The district court handles local and national cases. The Barasat police have a jurisdiction of 4.6 square kilometres (1.8 sq mi), and serves a population of 417,663 in the Barasat municipal area. There are two police outposts (in Barasat and Badu), and a women's police station (in KNC Road, near Barasat Govt College) in the town.

=== Zilla Parishad (district council) ===
The Zilla Parishad of North 24 Parganas was founded on 26 June 1986, with the north–south bifurcation of the 24 Parganas district. The highest tier of the three-tier panchayati raj system, its headquarters are at Barasat. It has six riverine panchayat samitis in the Sundarbans, which has a saline tract on one side and rich alluvial tracts of the Ichamati River basin and industrial belt of Barrackpore on the other side. Its territory extends on the east to the Bangladesh border.

== Notable residents ==
Bankim Chandra Chattopadhyay was the deputy magistrate of 24 Parganas during the 19th century.

Graves Haughton became a cadet in 1808, and received his first commission on 13 March 1810 from Barasat cadet institution.

== Educational Institutes ==
- The city of Barasat comprises various education institutions ranging from pre-schools, secondary schools, high schools, colleges and universities. It has both government funded institutions and privately operated institutions.

=== Schools ===
- Auxilium Convent School
- Barasat Indira Gandhi Memorial High School
- Barasat Peary Charan Sarkar Government High School
- Barasat Mahatma Gandhi Memorial High School
- Calcutta Public School
- Kalikrishna Girls' High School (First school for female education in Indian subcontinent)
- Adamas School
- Aditya Academy Secondary
- Bodhisukha School
- Central Modern School, Bararat
- Delhi Public School, Bararat
- Kalyani Public School
- Nabapally Boy's High School
- Nabapally Jogendranath Balika Vidyamandir
- Narayana School
- Purba Barasat Adarsha Bidyapeeth
- Sudhir Memorial School

=== Colleges & Universities ===
- Adamas University
- Barasat College
- Barasat Government College
- Barasat Government Medical College and Hospital
- Brainware University
- Camellia School of Engineering & Technology
- Eminent College of Pharmaceutical Technology
- West Bengal State University

== See also ==
- Barrackpore
- Basirhat
- Kolkata
- North 24 Parganas
