= David Hare =

David Hare may refer to:

- David Hare (philanthropist) (1775–1842), Scottish philanthropist
- David Hare (artist) (1917–1992), American sculptor and photographer
- David Hare (playwright) (born 1947), English playwright and theatre and film director

== See also ==
- David O'Hare (born 1990), Irish tennis player
