= Kalikrishna Girls' High School =

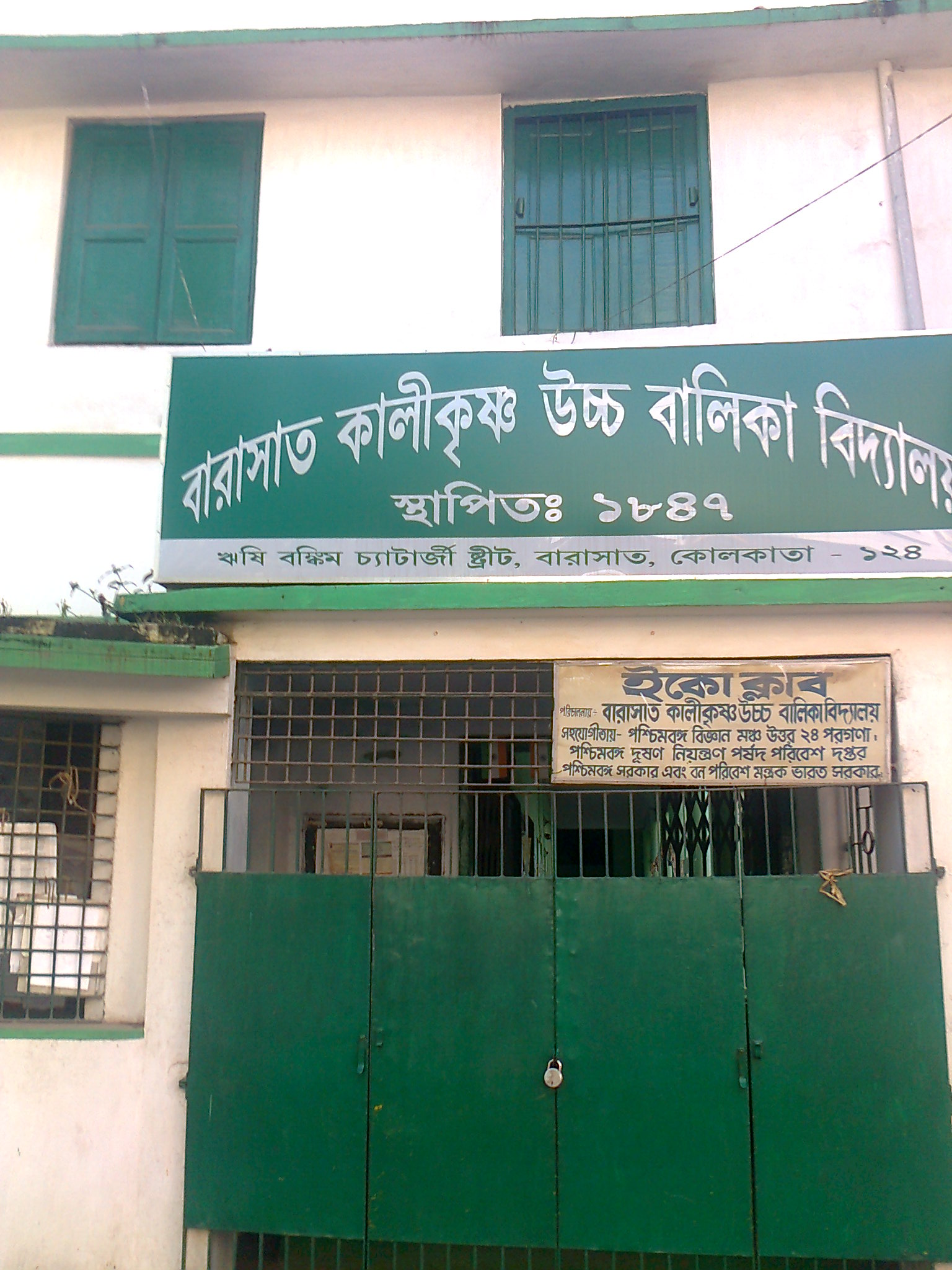
- Sign board of school entrance

Location
- Rishi Bankim Chandra Road; Barasat, West Bengal, 700124; India
- Coordinates: 22.7138°N 88.4783°E

Information
- Type: High school
- Established: 1847; 179 years ago
- Founder: Kalikrishna Mitra
- School board: West Bengal Board of Secondary Education
- Headmistress: Mousumi Sengupta
- Grades: I–XII
- Gender: Girls
- Language: Bengali
- Colours: Green and white

Barasat Kalikrishna Girls' High School is India's first girls' school and currently a state government affiliated heritage high school for girls in Barasat, West Bengal, India.

== History ==
It was established in 1847 by Kalikrishna Mitra, with the support of Nabinkrishna Mitra and Peary Charan Sarkar.

The school faced resistance from conservative Brahmin in Bengal but was able to sustain the school due to the support of John Elliot Drinkwater Bethune. It has the distinction of being the first non-government girls' school, run by Indians. This is the first free Girls' High School of British India established by any Indian except Christian Missionary or Government.

== See also ==
- List of schools in West Bengal
