= Eminent College of Pharmaceutical Technology =

College in West Bengal

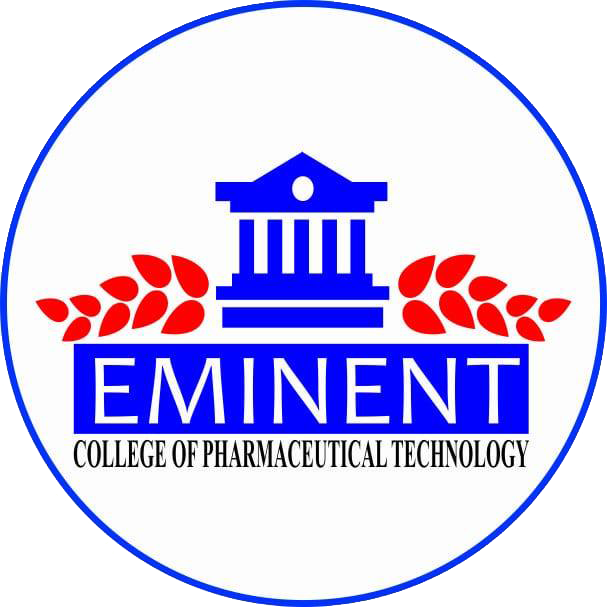
- Motto: Excellence in technical education
- Type: Private
- Established: 2017; 9 years ago
- Affiliations: MAKAUT & WBSCT&VE&SD
- Chairman: Mr. Samir Chakraborty
- Principal: Prof. Suchandra Sen
- Location: Moshpukr, Barbaria, Barasat, West Bengal, 700 126; 22°44′48.0″N 88°27′54.0″E
- Campus: Rural, 18.5 km from Netaji Subhas Chandra Bose International Airport
- Approvals: AICTE & PCI
- Location within West Bengal Location within India

Eminent College of Pharmaceutical Technology (ECPT) is a private pharmacy college located in Moshpukr, Barbaria, Barasat, West Bengal, about 4.8 kilometers from the Barasat Junction railway station and 11.4 kilometers from the Barrackpore Railway Station. It was established in 2017 with its first batch of D. Pharm students and B. Pharm was started next year. It offers a 2 year Diploma in Pharmacy and 4 year Bachelor of Pharmacy courses (Degree). The college is affiliated to Maulana Abul Kalam Azad University of Technology and West Bengal State Council of Technical and Vocational Education and Skill Development and approved by All India Council for Technical Education (AICTE) and PCI.

== Campus ==
Eminent College of Pharmaceutical Technology occupies a campus area of 10 bigha.

== Laboratories ==
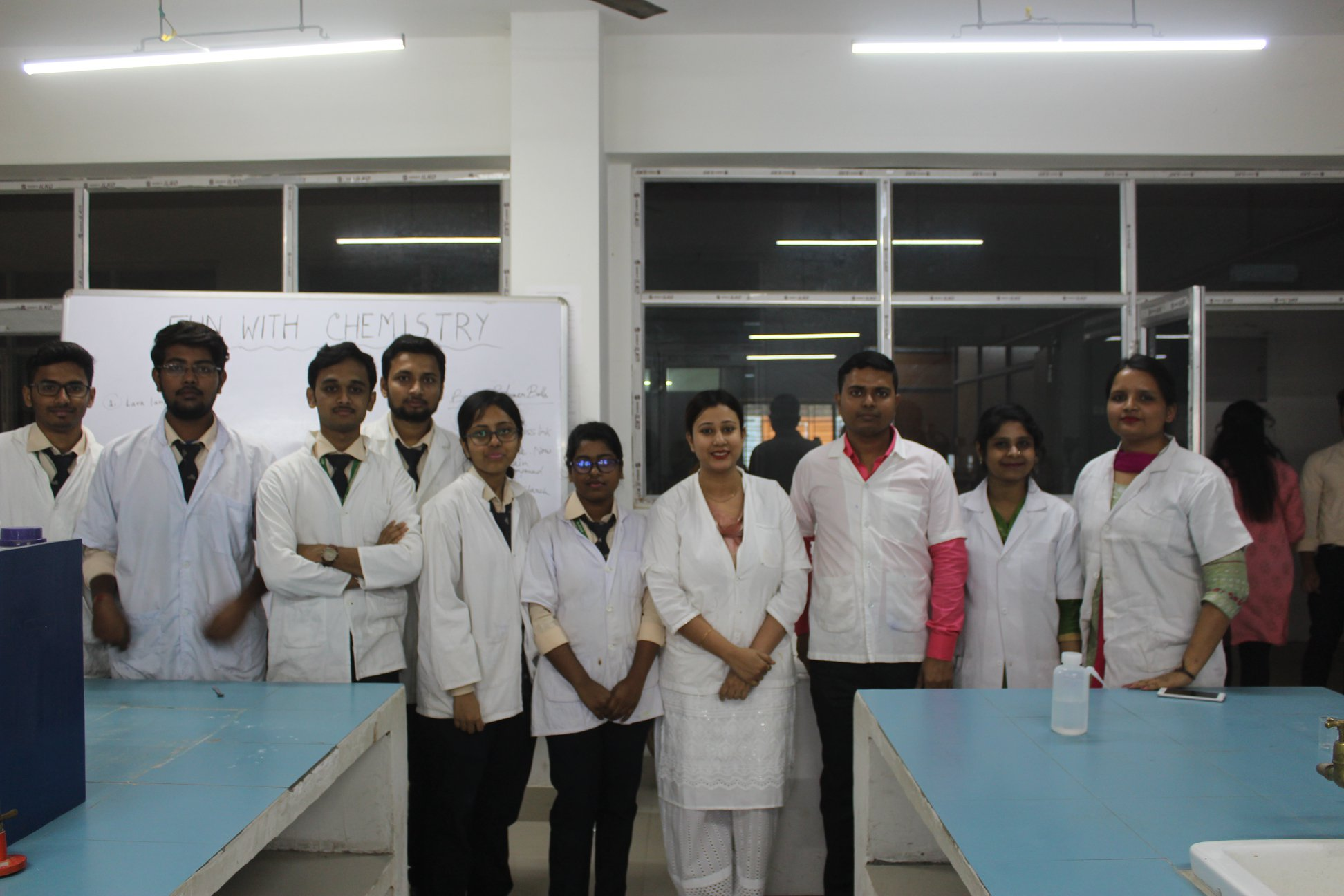
ECPT Laboratory

ECPT have laboratories for the Degree, Diploma curriculum and research. ECPT laboratories are equipped with instruments and machines prescribed by the Pharmacy Council of India. UV-Visible spectrophotometer, Colorimeter, Micro-Centrifuge, Nephelometer - Turbidimeter, Flame-Photometer, Refractometer, Polarimeter, Conductivity meter, D.M. Plant, Double Cone Blender, Melting Point Apparatus, Ball Mill Apparatus, Tablet Coating Machine, Tablet Punching Machine, Tablet Hardness Tester, Tablet Counter, Dissolution Test Apparatus, Ampoule Sealing Machine, Projection Microscope, Histamine Chamber, Actophotometer, Student's Organ Bath, Laminar Air Flow etc. are few instruments available in ECPT laboratories with other necessary instruments for pharmacy courses.

== See also ==
- List of institutions of higher education in West Bengal
- Education in India
- Education in West Bengal
