= Girish Chandra Sen =

Brahmo Samaj missionary and translator (1835–1910)

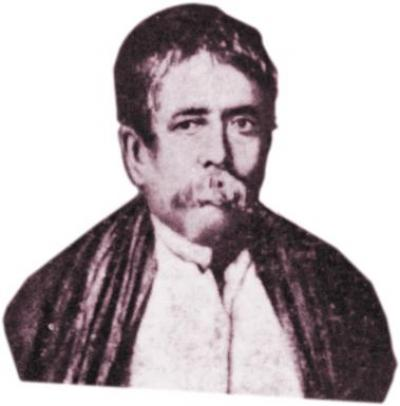
- Born: 1835; Panchdona, Bengal Presidency, British India
- Died: 15 August 1910 (aged 74–75); Calcutta, Bengal Presidency, British India
- Occupations: Scholar, Missionary

Girish Chandra Sen (c. 1835 – 15 August 1910) was a Bengali religious scholar and translator. He was a Brahmo Samaj missionary and known for being the first publisher of the Qur’an into Bengali language in 1886.

== Early life ==
Sen was born in a Baidya family in the village of Panchdona in Narayanganj District in Bengal (now part of Narsingdi District in Bangladesh). He studied in Pogose School in Dhaka.

In 1869, Keshub Chunder Sen chose from amongst his missionaries, four persons and ordained them as professors of four old religions of the world. He was selected to study Islam. Others selected to study different religions were Gour Govinda Ray for Hinduism, Protap Chandra Mozoomdar for Christianity, and Aghore Nath Gupta for Buddhism. A firm believer in the basic unity of all religions, he immersed himself in his studies and later went to Lucknow in 1876 to study Arabic, Islamic literature and the Islamic religious texts. After five years (1881–1886) of studies, he produced the first Bengali translation of the Quran.

== Works ==
On completion of his studies, he returned to Kolkata and engaged in the translation of Islamic scriptures. After about five years (1881–1886) of studies, he produced an annotated Bengali version of the Qur’an via Persian.

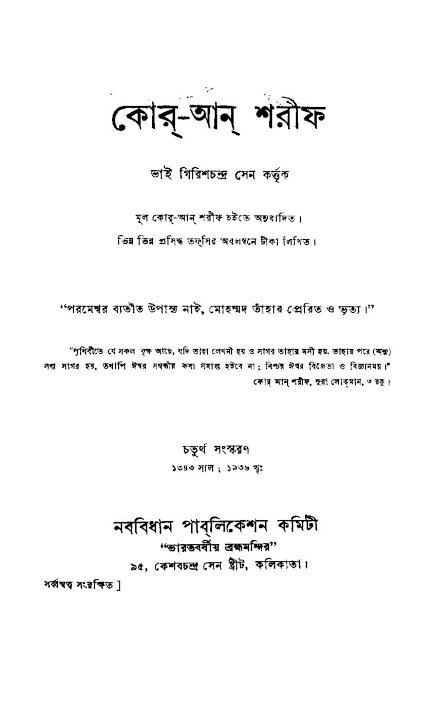
Quran translation of Girish Chandra Sen

Sen is also the first known translator of the works of Shakespeare in Bengali. His autobiography, Atmajivani, was published in 1906. Initially, Sen worked at the Dhaka Prakash and later as an assistant editor at the Sulava Samachar and Bangabandhu and as editor and publisher of the monthly Mahila. While still at school he wrote a book, Banitabinodan, on the importance of women's education and Ramakrishna Paramhangser Ukti O Jivani. For his great contributions in translating Islamic literature into Bengali language, Muslims of Bengal often referred to him as Bhai Girish Chandra.
