= Peary Charan Sarkar =

Educationist and philanthropist

- Born: 23 January 1823; Chorbagan, Calcutta, Bengal Presidency, Company Raj
- Died: September 30, 1875 (aged 52); Calcutta, British India
- Other names: Pyari Churn Sircar, Pyari Charan Sircar, Peary Churn Sircar
- Education: Hare School, Hindu College
- Occupations: Educationist, textbook Writer, school teacher
- Organization: Barasat Peary Charan Sarkar Government High School
- Known for: Female education
- Children: Sailendra Sircar
- Father: Bhairav Chandra Sarkar
- Relatives: Nripendra Nath Sircar (grandson) Birendranath Sircar (Great Grandson) Brajendranath De ICS (Great Nephew)

Peary Charan Sarkar (1823–1875) was an educationist, philanthropist and textbook writer in nineteenth century Bengal. His series of Reading Books introduced a whole generation of Bengalis to the English language, sold in the millions and were translated into every major Indian language. He was also a pioneer of women's education in Bengal and was called 'Arnold of the East.

== Early life and family ==
Sarkar was born at Chorbagan in North Calcutta. His family hailed from Taragram in Hooghly district of West Bengal, and the family name was originally Das. For services rendered, the Nawab of Bengal had awarded the title 'Sarkar' to Bireshwar Das, an ancestor. Bhairav Chandra Sarkar, Pyari Charan's father, had become quite wealthy as a ship chandler serving the East India Company, and the family was regarded as a good example of the new bhadralok class. Sarkar was educated at David Hare's Pataldanga School and admitted to Hindu College, but his father and one of his brothers died shortly afterwards. His eldest brother was working in Hooghly and could only send money to their mother; as a Hindu widow she had little standing in the family and was ejected from the family home, along with Sircar and his younger brothers and sisters. Peary Charan Sarkar was married to Princess Kailashkamini Dasi, the great grandchild of Maharaja Manik Ram

Sarkar was forced to leave college and take up a job in 1843 as a teacher at the Hooghly School. In the same year, his essay 'On the Effect upon India of the New Communication with Europe by Means of Steam' appeared in the Department of Public Instruction's Report on Education. Sarkar became headmaster of Barasat School (later named Barasat Peary Charan Sarkar Government High School in his honour), in 1846, and occupied the post until 1854.

== The Barasat Girls' School ==
At Barasat, two brothers, Nabin Krishna Mitra and Kalikrishna Mitra, offered in 1847 to fund Bengal's first private school for girls if Sarkar would agree to help set it up. The school (later renamed Kalikrishna Girls' High School) began operations, but Barasat was an extremely conservative Brahmin-majority area and the residents were outraged. Swapan Basu, in his biography of Sircar, alleges that rumours circulated that several landlords were offering money to have Sircar assassinated. At this juncture, John Elliot Drinkwater Bethune stepped in to help. He exhorted the financiers not to give up, and with time the opposition weakened. Bethune visited the Barasat school in 1848, and was so impressed that in 1849 he set up the Bethune School for Girls in Calcutta. Sircar continued to actively in campaign for women's education, helping to set up several more schools, including a technical and an agricultural school. In 1854, with a stipend of two hundred rupees, he was appointed headmaster of the Colootollah School and was responsible for changing its name to Hare School.

== Presidency College ==
In 1863 Sarkar was appointed as a temporary lecturer at Presidency College, Kolkata. In 1867, he was made a permanent lecturer. There was some opposition to this, as Sarkar had never completed his education, but such a promotion was not uncommon, and Sircar's abilities were sufficient to the heads of the school.

He continued his campaign for women's rights, donating two and a half thousand rupees to the Widow Remarriage Fund in 1869. In 1873, he became a member of the working committee of Keshub Chunder Sen's Society for the Suppression of Vice in Indian Society. He was also associated with the Bengal Temperance Society. Keshab Chandra Sen later took up his work on temperance in Indian Reform Association.

After he was appointed as Professor at Presidency College, Sarkar would visit Colootollah school and take a few classes whenever he could. He was regarded as a very meticulous teacher, always correcting his students' work precisely. He also insisted that they learn practical skills as well, and used to teach his students gardening. In 1875, while working in his garden, Sarkar cut his finger. The wound turned gangrenous and an operation failed to save his life. Sarkar died on 1 October 1875.

== The Reading Books ==
The First Book of Reading for Native Children was published in 1850, likely by the School Book Press, and the rest of the Reading Books (numbers two to six) came out between 1851 and 1870, not necessarily in sequence. In 1875 Sarkar's friend and colleague at Presidency College, E. R. Lethbridge, proposed a revision of the books and began negotiations with Thacker and Spink of Calcutta to republish them. However, around this time Lethbridge was contacted by Macmillan and Company, later giving the books to them. Thacker had already printed a few copies, and when the deal was discovered, Macmillan had to buy the books to appease Thacker. Macmillan was looking for a ready-made series with which to launch their Indian publishing business.

== Other achievements ==
Sarkar played a significant role in the Bengal Renaissance. Apart from his role in initiating women's education and impressing upon people to send their daughters to school when Bethune School was opened, he played a pioneering role in the teaching of agriculture in a scientific manner. He set up a vocational training centre for the children of women workers and was instrumental in opening many new schools. He was one of the patrons of Hindu Mela.

Sarkar took charge of editing the government newspaper Education Gazette in 1866, but resigned when he was not allowed to publish certain news. He took a leading role in promoting prohibition and was one of the founders of Eden Hindu Hostel, which is located on the street named after Sarkar: Peary Charan Sarkar Street

He published two newspapers titled Well Wisher and Hitasadhak.

== Sources ==
- Sangsad Bangla Charitrabhidhan (The Sangsad Dictionary of Biography) (Calcutta: Sahitya Sangsad, 1998) (Bengali language source).
- Swapan Basu, Pyari Charan Sarkar, (Calcutta: Bangla Sahitya Akademi, 2001) (Bengali language source).
