= Kalikrishna Mitra =

Indian educationist and philanthropist

- Born: 1822; Calcutta, Bengal Presidency, British India
- Died: 2 August 1891 (aged 68–69); Calcutta, Bengal Presidency, British India
- Education: Hare School, Presidency College, Kolkata
- Occupations: Writer; social workers; educators
- Known for: Female education

Kalikrishna Mitra (1822 – 2 August 1891) was an Indian philanthropist, educator and writer. He established the first non-government girls’ school in India.

== Early life and education ==
Mitra was born to Shibnarayan Mitra in Kolkata, British India. He passed from Hare School and entered into the Presidency College but due to poor economic condition he had to leave his studies and start living in his maternal house at Barasat, presently North 24 Parganas district.

His elder brother was a notable doctor, Nabinkrishna Mitra.

== Contribution ==
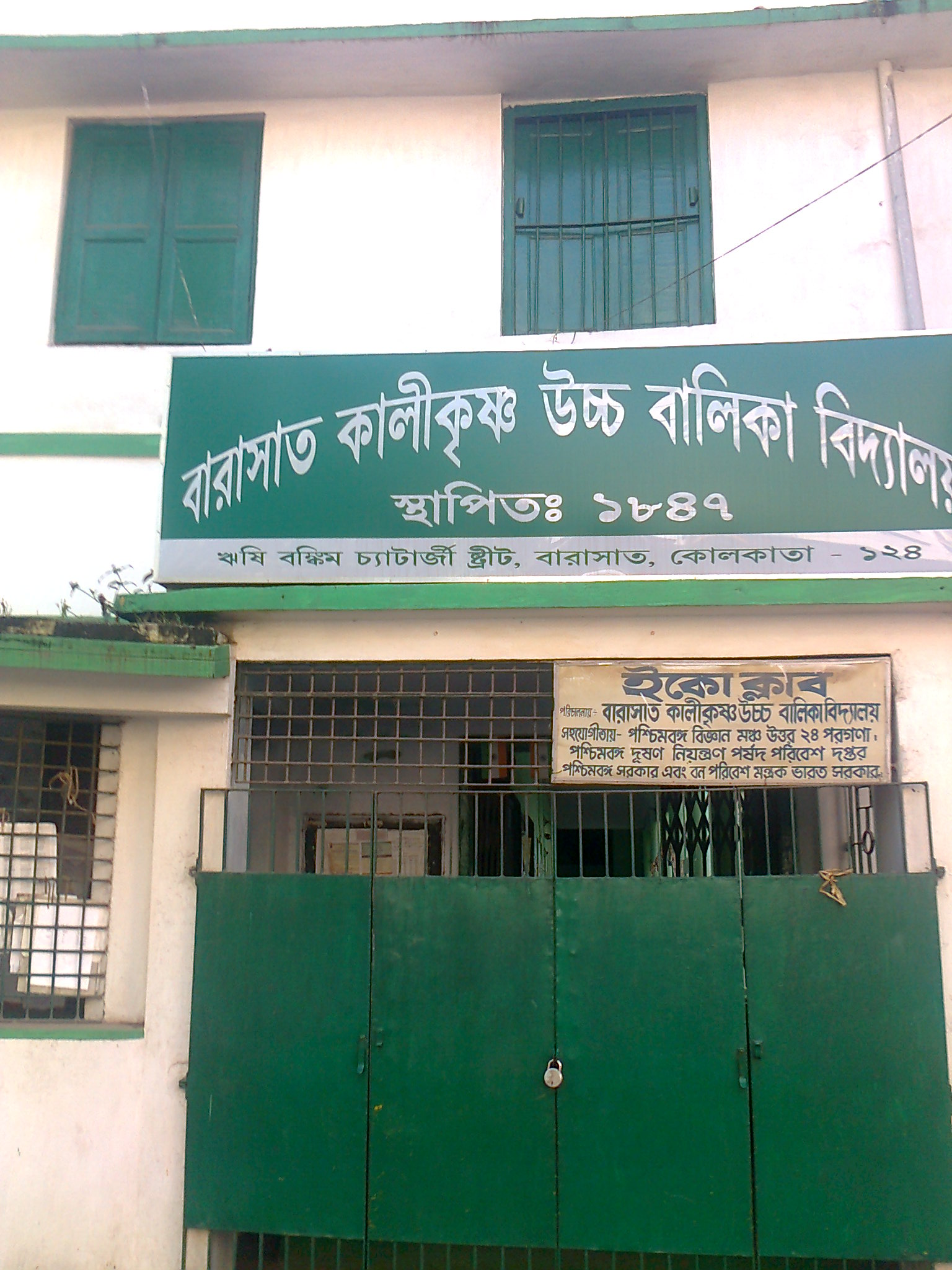
The Girls School established in 1847 named after Kalikrishna

Mitra involved himself with progressive education movement and several activities relating to some social reforms mainly in Bengal. In 1847 he established a private girls school in Barasat with the help of his brother Nabinkrishna and educationist Peary Charan Sarkar. This was the first school for the girls of aristocratic Hindu families established by any Indian. Initially it was started with only two girls. Kuntibala, daughter of Nabinkrishna is one of them. Although such activities was strongly opposed by Hindu Zaminders and the then conservative society but Ishwar Chandra Vidyasagar and John Elliot Drinkwater Bethune supported Mitra's enormous effort for women education in Bengal. Latter the school was renamed as Kalikrishna Girls' High School. Even Bethune got inspiration for establishment Bethune School in 1849, when he went there for inspection as President of the Council of Education. Mitra organised an agricultural firm of 150 Bighas for scientific farming, plantation and research in Barasat. He brought modern equipment from England for this purpose. He also contributed to spread out for Homeopathy medication.

== Literary works ==
Mitra had knowledge in English literature, philosophy, yoga, history and science. He published various articles in Bengali and English magazines. Mitra wrote few books namely:

- Bama Chikitsa
- Garhasthyobabostha O Shishu Chikitsa
- Pashu Chikitsa
