= Sailendra Sircar Vidyalaya =

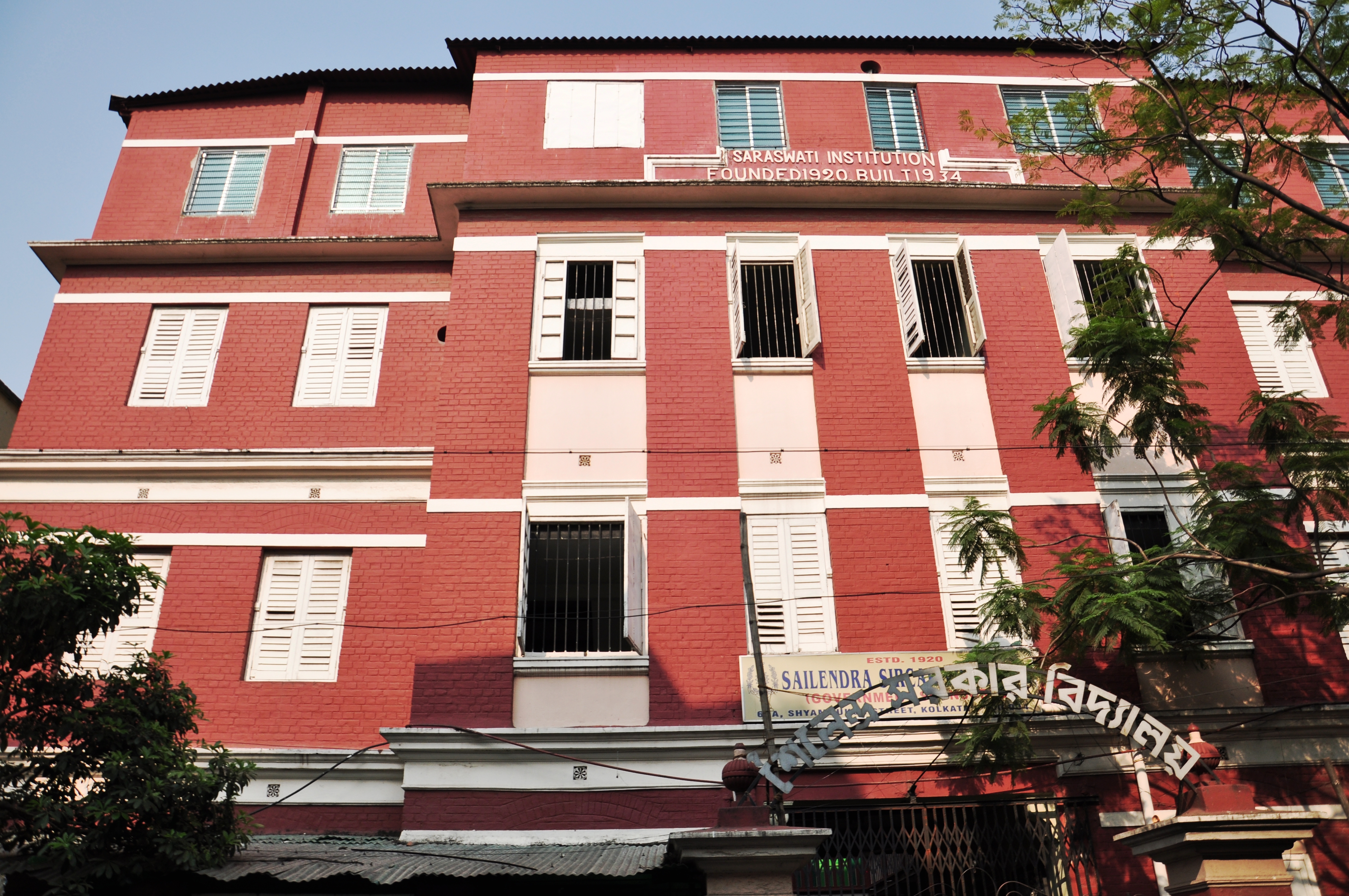
- Main school building

Location
- 62A, Shyampukur St, Shyambazar, Sovabazar, Hati Bagan, Kolkata, West Bengal, 700004; India
- Coordinates: 22.5978164°N 88.3680346°E

Information
- Former name: Saraswati Institution
- Type: Higher Secondary School
- Motto: "Work is Worship"
- Religious affiliation: Secular
- Established: 5 January 1920; 106 years ago
- Founder: Sailendra Sircar
- School board: West Bengal Board of Secondary Education
- School district: Kolkata
- Gender: Male
- Language: Bengali
- Campus type: Urban
- Website: www.ssvkolkata.in/index.php

Sailendra Sircar Vidyalaya is affiliated to the West Bengal Board of Secondary Education (WBBSE) and is one of the oldest Bengali medium schools in Kolkata, India. It is located at 62A, Shyampukur Street in north Kolkata. It is a government sponsored higher secondary School.

== About the school ==
The school was founded on 5 January 1920 and its original name was Saraswati Institution. The school was renamed as Sailendra Sircar Vidyalaya to pay homage to the founder headmaster of the school Sailendranath Sircar in 1948. Sailendranath Sircar was the youngest son of Sri Peary Churn Sircar, a distinguished educationalist, philanthropist and the pioneer of Temperance Reform in undivided Bengal and the author of the English primer- The first Book of Reading.

The current main building of the school was built in 1934. Another building on the back side of the main building houses the primary section.

The institution celebrated their 100 years of establishment in 2020.

== Notable alumni ==
- Buddhadeb Bhattacharya, Former Chief Minister of West Bengal
- Ashoke Sen, theoretical physicist working in string theory
- Shyamal Kumar Sen, Chief Justice of the Allahabad High Court and Governor of West Bengal

== See also ==
- Education in India
- List of schools in India
- Education in West Bengal
