= Nripendra Nath Sircar =

Indian lawyer and political figure

Sir. Nripendra Nath Sircar KCSI CSI
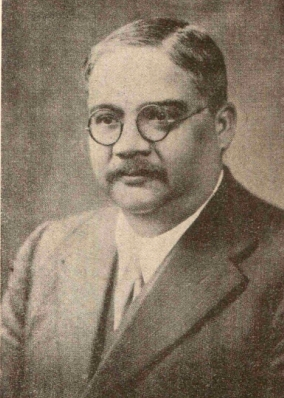
- Sir. N.N. Sircar

33rd Advocate-General of Bengal
- In office 1928–1934
- Preceded by: H. R. Panckridge
- Succeeded by: Sir. A.K. Roy

Member of Subordinate Judicial Service
- In office 1902–1905

Member of Viceroy's Executive Council
- In office 1934–1939
- Preceded by: Brojendra Mitter
- Succeeded by: Bepin Behari Ghose

Personal details
- Born: Calcutta
- Died: Calcutta
- Spouse: Lady Nabanalini Basu
- Relations: Peary Charan Sarkar (grandparent)
- Children: Birendranath Sircar
- Parent: Nagendra Nath Sircar(father)
- Education: Presidency College Calcutta; Lincoln’s Inn, Ripon College
- Alma mater: Presidency College
- Profession: Advocate-General, Leader of Indian Legislative Assembly

Sir Nripendra Nath Sircar, KCSI (1876 - August 1945) was an Indian lawyer and political figure. He was Advocate-General of Bengal from 1928 to 1934 and Law Member of the Council of the Governor-General of India from 1934 to 1939. He was the grandson of educationist Peary Charan Sarkar and the father of filmmaker Birendranath Sircar.

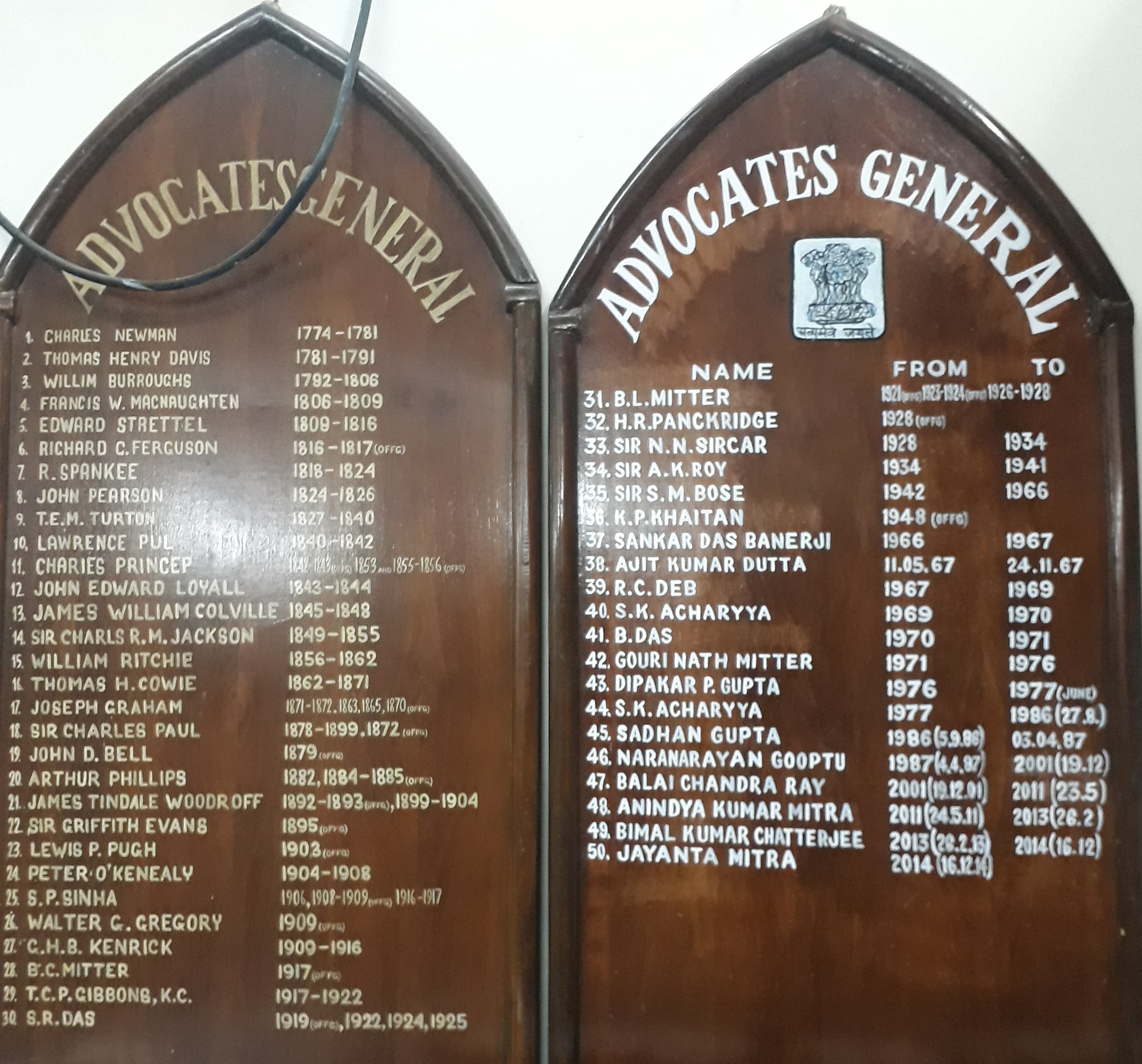
Sir. N.N. Sircar mentioned as 33rd Advocate-General of Bengal on display board at Calcutta High Court.

== Education ==
Sircar graduated from Ripon College with Law in 1897 and District Court in Bhagalpur, as Pleader in 1898. In 1891 he was selected for the post of Professor of Chemistry at Agra College. Later, in 1902 he was appointed as a member of Subordinate Judicial Service in Bengal. Sircar was the First Honoursman in the Bar Final Michaelmas Term of 1907. He achieved Honours in Mathematics, Physics, and Chemistry in his BA, and went on to earn an MA in Chemistry. He was also the holder of the Foundation Scholarship at Presidency College.

== Personal life ==
Sircar married Nabanalini Basu, the only daughter of Durgadas Basu, a landowner from Baraset, in 1896. The couple had eight sons. Nabanalini Sircar was keenly interested in Bengal's social welfare and education of women. The Sircars travelled extensively in Palestine, Syria, Egypt, Europe, United States, and Canada.
