= Sulabh Samachar =

Bengali weekly, published from Kolkata during the British Raj

Sulabh Samachar সুলভ সমাচার
- Type: Weekly newspaper
- Editor: Umanath Gupta
- Founded: 1870
- Political alignment: none
- Language: Bengali
- Headquarters: Kolkata, Bengal, British India
- Circulation: 8,000

Sulabh Samachar (Bengali: সুলভ সমাচার, Sulov Somachar) was a Bengali weekly, published from Kolkata, a pioneering journalistic venture in 19th century Bengal.

== Indian Reform Association ==
Keshub Chunder Sen established the Indian Reform Association on returning from England in 1870. One of the things that impressed him was the immense power of the press, particularly the daily newspaper in England. The objective of the Cheap Literature section of the Association was to disseminate useful and scientific information amongst the masses by the publication of cheap and useful tracts.

== Cheap Newspaper ==
Sulabh Samachar was started on 16 November 1870. It was priced one pice (the smallest unit of currency). Umanath Gupta was the first editor of this cheap journal for the information of the masses. At the time there were about a dozen similar pice newspapers in Kolkata.

Initially 1,000 copies were printed. The circulation increased to 5,000 in two weeks and in two months to 8,000. It was avidly read by common people who were for brought in touch with events that were happening around them.

The weekly dealt with diverse subjects such as the miserable condition of the peasants, the administrative system, measures for the uplift of the common people and their education, abuses of the zamindari system and exploitation by the zamindars, abuses of the British administration, importance of science and scientific explanations in elementary form, diseases of the human body and their remedies, and prices of commodities, apart from general news from urban and rural areas.
