= David Hare (philanthropist) =

Scottish watchmaker (1775–1842)

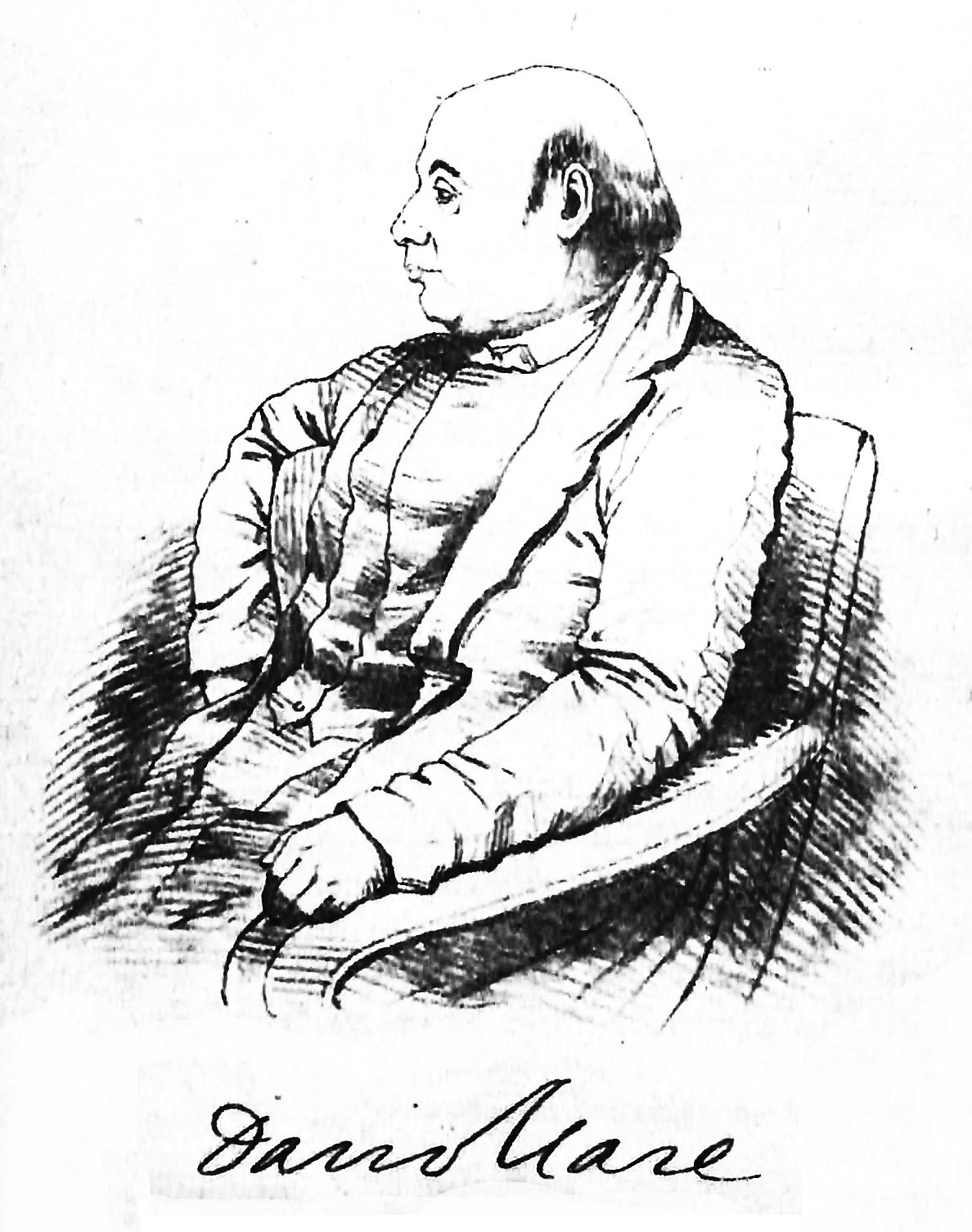

David Hare (1775 – 1 June 1842) was a Scottish watchmaker, philanthropist, and educationist in Bengal, India (see East India Company and their rule in India). He founded many educational institutions in Calcutta (now Kolkata), such as the Hindu School, and Hare School and helped in founding Presidency College.

== Early life ==
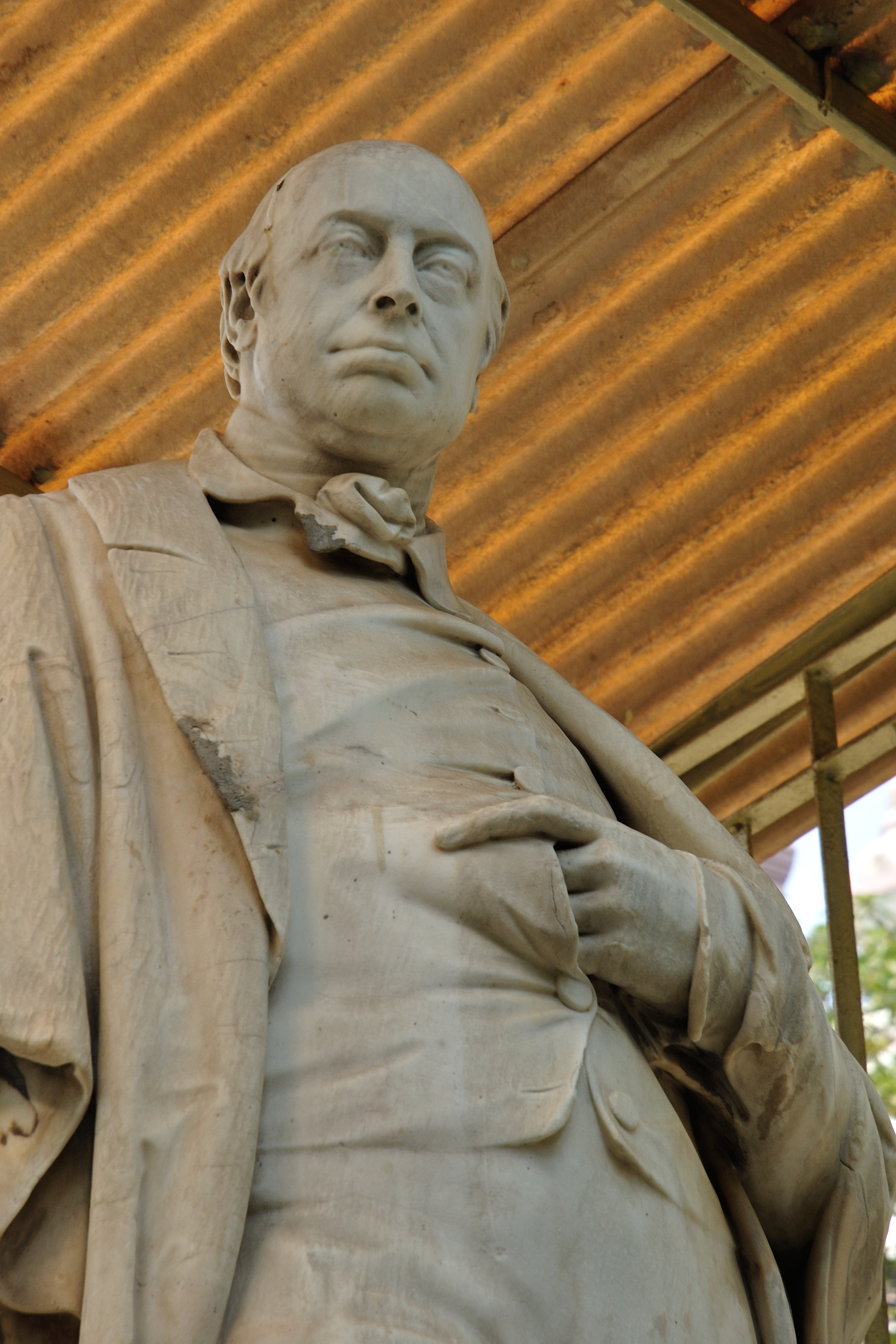
Statue of David Hare by E.H. Baily at Hare School

Hare was born in Scotland in 1775. He came to India in 1800 to make a fortune as a watch maker. However, while he prospered in his business his mind was distracted by the deplorable conditions of the native population and unlike most of the other people who returned to their native land after gathering a fortune to live a life in peace and prosperity, he decided to stay back in the country and devote himself entirely to the cause of its uplift. However, he was no missionary, seeking to convert others to his religion. He lived his own life and allowed others to live their own, only helping to improve their condition. He also founded the School Book Society.

== Contribution ==
Hare felt that the need of the country was English education. He used to discuss the topic with many of his customers, who came to buy watches in his shop. Raja Ram Mohan Roy went to Kolkata in 1814 and within a short time, they became friends. In 1816, he went on his own and attended a session of the Raja’s Atmiya Sabha. Both of them discussed at length the proposal to establish an English school at Kolkata. Babu Buddi Nath Mukherjee - another member of Atmiya Sabha - later discussed the matter with Sir Hyde East, Chief Justice of the Supreme Court. That led to the foundation of Hindu College, later renamed Presidency College, Kolkata, on 20 January 1817.

Thereafter, David Hare was instrumental in establishing the School Book Society on 6 May 1817. It took the initiative to print and publish text books in both English and Bengali. This society contributed substantially to the flowering of the Bengal Renaissance.

On 1 September 1818, he established the 'Calcutta School Society'. He and Radhakanta Deb were secretaries of the society. He worked tirelessly to establish some schools to teach in English and Bengali, according to new methods of teaching, at such places as Thanthania, Kalitala and Arpuly. Every day, he visited the schools and Hindu College and met almost every student. So great was his attachment and commitment to these students that it acted as a great inspiration of many of them. Some of the greatest names in subsequent years were all his students. It was much later that Alexander Duff or Henry Louis Vivian Derozio came on the scene and influenced the course of events.

Additionally, David Hare was a subscriber to the Ladies' Society for Native Female Education (formed in 1824), and would be present in the periodical examinations held by the society.

== Later life ==
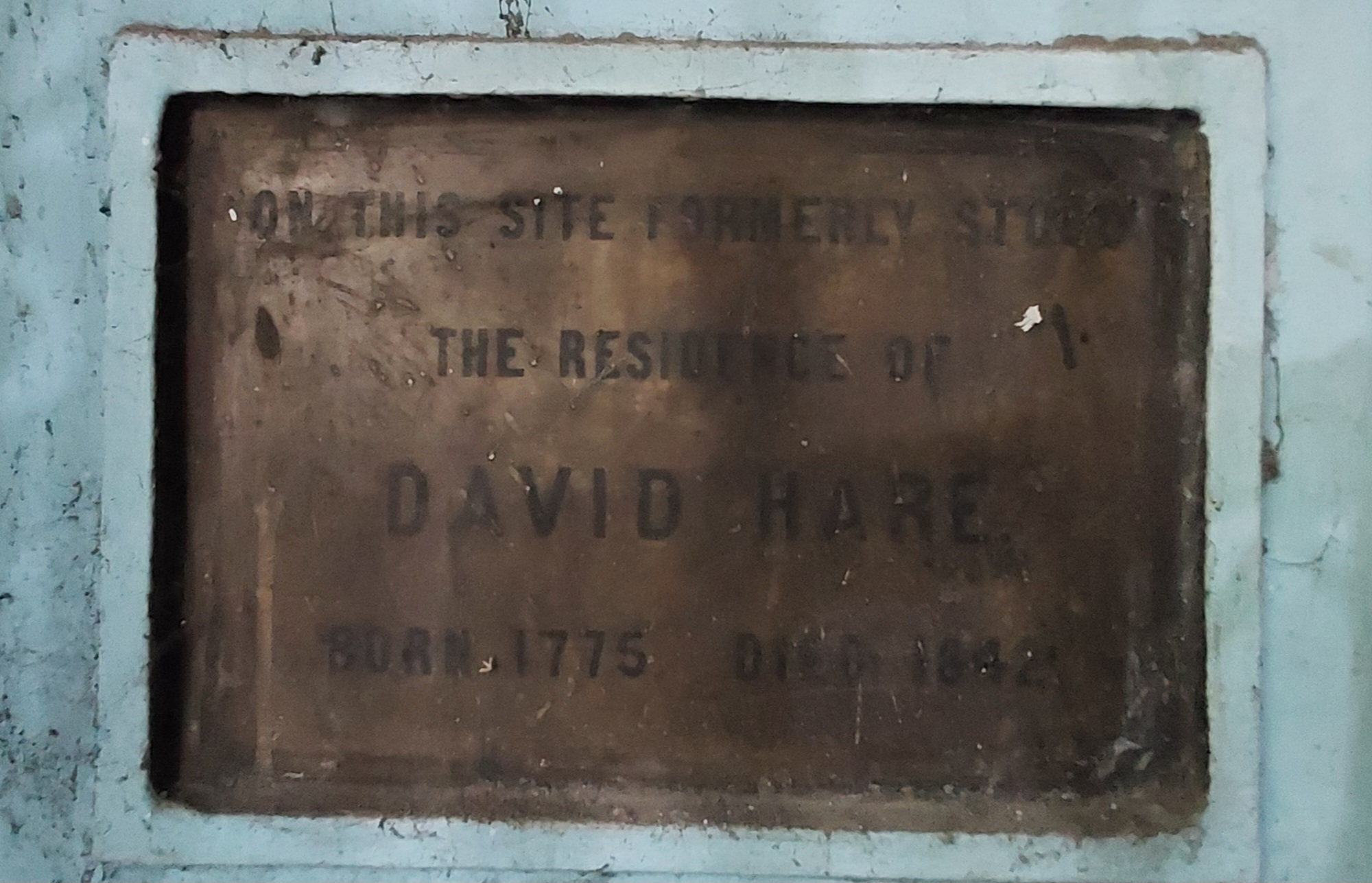
The Plaque of David Hare in Nicco House

In later life, he did not find time to devote to his watch business and so he sold it to a friend named Grey and spent some of the money to buy a small house for himself and the rest for the development of the schools. After a long life of activity he fell ill. He was attacked by cholera. One of his students, Dr. Prasanna Kumar Mitra, tried his best but all efforts failed and David Hare died on 1 June 1842. As news spread around the city, a pall of gloom spread over the city. The Christian missionaries refused to allot him land in their cemeteries, as they thought that he was a non-believer. He was buried in what was then the compound of Hare School-Presidency College that he had donated. The tomb, marked with a bust statue, currently falls within the College Square (renamed Vidyasagar Udyan) swimming pool, opposite to Hare School.

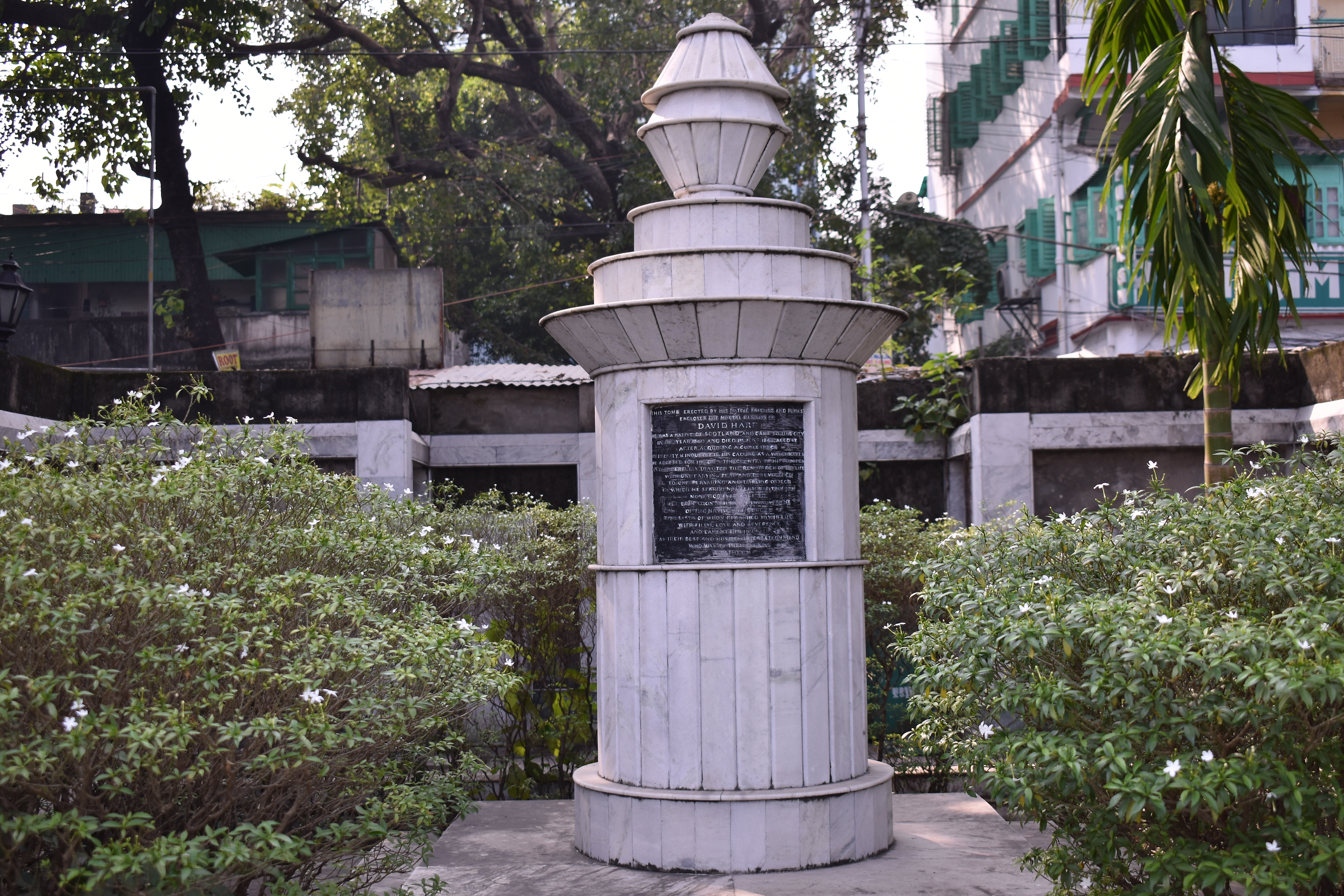
The grave of David Hare, college square, Kolkata

According to Sivanath Sastri, “As his body was brought out of Mr. Gray’s house, thousands of people, some in vehicles, others on foot, followed it. The scene that was witnessed by Kolkata on that day will not be witnessed again. Right from Bowbazar crossing to Madhab Dutta’s bazaar, the entire road was flooded with people.”

The place where he lived, is presently named as Nicco House at Hare Street. A plaque is imbedded there. A life-size statue (pictured) was built with public donations and placed in the compound of Hare School.
