= Protap Chunder Mozoomdar =

Indian philosopher, reformer (1840–1905)

Protap Chunder Majoomdar
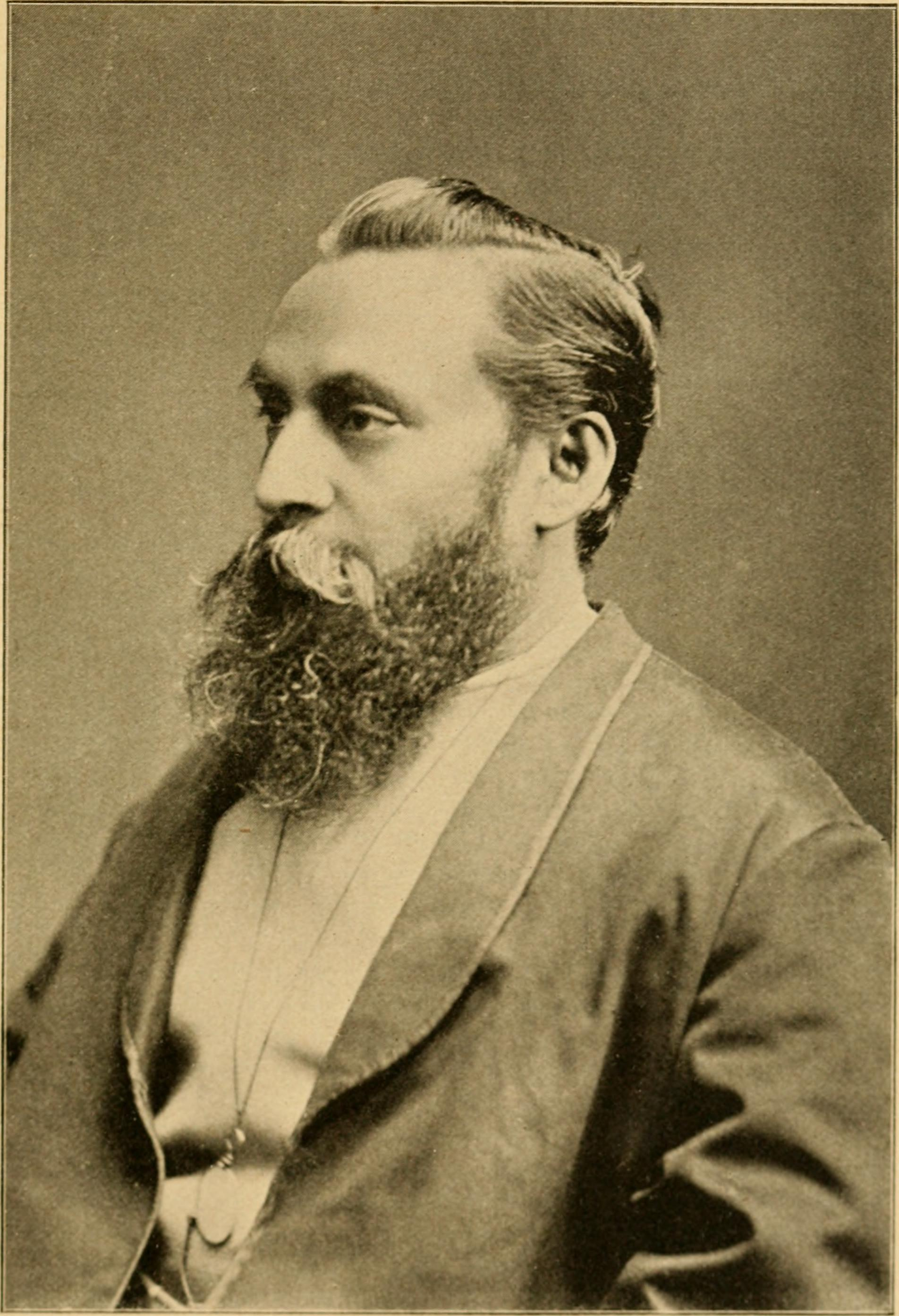
- Born: 2 October 1840; Bansberia, Bengal Presidency, British India (present-day Hooghly District, West Bengal, India)
- Died: 21 May 1905 (aged 64); Calcutta, Bengal Presidency, British India
- Occupations: Writer, Religious Leader

Protap Chunder Mozoomdar (Bengali: প্রতাপ চন্দ্র মজুমদার Protap Chôndro Mojumdar, also transliterated as Pratap Chander Mozoomdar) (2 Oct 1840 – 21 May 1905) was a leader of the Hindu reform movement, the Brahmo Samaj, in Bengal, India, and a close follower of Keshub Chandra Sen. He was a leading exemplar of the interaction between the philosophies and ethics of Hinduism and Christianity, about which he wrote in his book, The Oriental Christ.

== Life and work ==
Sen and his colleagues agreed that four Brahmos would study and report on the relationship between Brahmo ideals and the four major world religions (Hinduism, Christianity, Buddhism and Islam). Gour Govinda Ray was deputed to examine Hinduism; Aghore Nath Gupta, Buddhism and Girish Chandra Sen, Islam. Mozoomdar was deputed to study Christianity. His resulting book, The Oriental Christ, was published by Geo. H. Ellis in Boston in 1883. It was much discussed in the West, and eventually led to an important correspondence between Mozoomdar and Max Müller about the relationship between Hinduism and Christianity. After Mozoomdar published the correspondence it led to controversy in both Britain and India. Müller's efforts to get Mozoomdar to state openly that he was now a Christian were rejected by Mozoomdar, who argued that the label "Christian" did not properly articulate his own positive view of Jesus as a model of self-sacrifice, one whose actions and claims to divinity he interpreted from within the Brahmo philosophy. In turn Müller stated that Christians should learn from the Brahmos and should abandon the traditional Christian formulation of Atonement.

Mozoomdar also wrote several books about the spiritual and social ideals of the Brahmo movement and a biography of Sen, The Life and Teachings of Keshub Chunder Sen (1887). He also wrote a biography of Ramakrishna, of whom he expressed deep admiration. He attended the Parliament of the World's Religions in Chicago in 1893 as a delegate for the Brahmo Samaj. In October 1893, Mozoomdar was elected a member of the American Antiquarian Society.

In 1919, the collected precepts of Protap Chunder Mazoomdar were published titled as Upadesh. The writings of Mazoomdar reflects an outlook that freely acknowledges the value and fundamental affinity of different religions – including Christianity, Islam, or Judaism – and the religious figures associated with their origin and propagation.

== Bibliography ==
- Suresh Chunder Bose (1940). The Life of Protap Chunder Mozoomdar. Nababidhan Trust.
- Sunrit Mullick (1 January 2010). The First Hindu Mission to America: The Pioneering Visits of Protap Chunder Mozoomdar. Northern Book Centre. ISBN 978-81-7211-281-3.
