= List of Indian Medical Service officers =

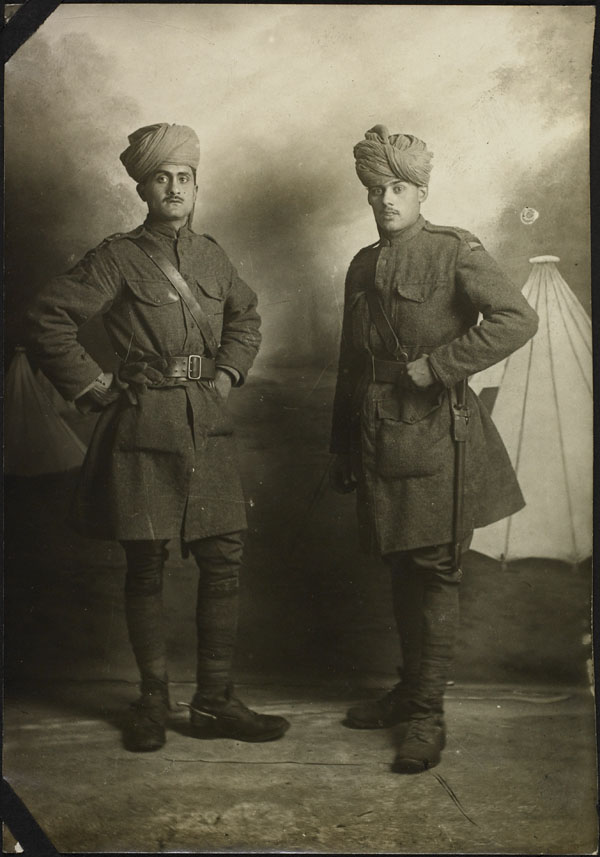
Unidentified members of the IMS in France, during the First World War

This is an incomplete list of officers of the Indian Medical Service (IMS) before independence.

== A to B ==
Name	Year of entry	Comments
Alfred William Alcock	1885	Passed eighth in the IMS.
Henry John Andrews	1917	Died in action during the Waziristan campaign (1919–1920)
George Bidie	1856	Served during Indian rebellion of 1857
Edward Alfred Birch	1866	Served through Bihar famine of 1873–74.
George Birdwood	1854	Became a leading authority on Indian handicraft.
Gerald Bomford	1874	Became Director-General of the IMS in 1905, succeeding Benjamin Franklin.
Charles Bowle-Evans	1894	Served with relief force at Chitral Expedition and took part in the Tochi Expedition.
Wajid Ali Khan Burki	1926	Ranked first among the only four officers selected from a pool of over sixty foreign-qualified candidates. Served in World War II, earned the awards of MBE and CBE. Reached the rank of Lieutenant General and served as Director General of the Pakistan Army Medical Corps.

== C ==
Name	Year of entry	Comments
Archibald Campbell (doctor)	1827	Superintendent of Darjeeling.
Henry Vandyke Carter		Made dissections for Gray's Anatomy.
Henry Cayley	1857	Passing at top of the list in IMS exam. Later, awarded the Mutiny Medal.
Havelock Charles		Professor of Anatomy at Calcutta Medical College.
P. V. Cherian		ENT surgeon.
Rickard Christophers		
Soorjo Coomar Goodeve Chuckerbutty	1855	First Indian to pass IMS exam January 1855.
William Robert Cornish	1854	
John Corse Scott		
John Crimmin		
Dirom Grey Crawford	1881	Wrote the history of the IMS
David Douglas Cunningham		
Hiraji Cursetji		

== D to G ==
Name	Year of entry	Comments
Umedram Lalbhai Desai		
Charles Donovan		
Stewart Ranken Douglas		
Jamshedji Duggan		
Theodore Duka		
Alfred Eteson		
Joseph Fayrer		
John Fleming (Gatton and Saltash MP)		
Benjamin Franklin (surgeon)	1869	
Peter Freyer	1875	Urological surgeon.
Henry Goodeve	1831	First professor of midwifery and anatomy in 1835, at Calcutta Medical College.
Vivian Bartley Green-Armytage	1907	Obstetrics and gynaecology.
Charles Robert Mortimer Green	1886	

== H to L ==
Name	Year of entry	Comments
Arthur Francis Hamilton	1905	Professor at the Grant Medical College.
George Harris (physician)		
William Frederick Harvey		
Patrick Hehir		
Thomas Holbein Hendley		
Richard Hingston		
Kanhoba Ranchoddas Kirtikar		
Khan Abdul Jabbar Khan		
Robert Knowles (parasitologist)		
Frank Lake		
Trevor Lawrence		
A. D. Loganathan		
George Carmichael Low		
Alvaro de Loyola Furtado		
Pardey Lukis		

== M to S ==
Name	Year of entry	Comments
Archibald Currie MacGilchrist		
Frederick Percival Mackie		
J. S. S. Martin		
Robert McCarrison		
Anderson Gray McKendrick		
Thomas Moore-Lane		
Frederic J. Mouat		
Thomas Shephard Novis		
Harold Rothery Nutt		
David Prain		
Amar Prasad Ray		
Leonard Rogers		
Ronald Ross		
Krishnaswami Srinivas Sanjivi		
R. B. Seymour Sewell		
Henry Edward Shortt		
Kanwar Singh		
John Alexander Sinton		
J. N. Sen Gupta	1940	Was attached with the 21st Field Ambulance during the Battle of Keren, where he died on 17 March 1941.He is commemorated at the Keren Cremation Memorial, Eritrea.
Sahib Singh Sokhey		
Henry Harpur Spry
John William Watson Stephens		
Charles Stiebel (medical missionary)	1914	1st Indian General Hospital(1914); 5th Indian General Hospital(1915); 135th Indian Field Ambulance; Attached to 62nd Punjabis; Fell in action, Mesopotamia, WWI, 1917
John Stephenson (zoologist)		

== T to W ==
Name	Year of entry	Comments
William Temple (VC)		
Thomas Thomson (botanist)		
R. Marthanda Varma		
Philip Verdon		
Laurence Waddell		
Frank Wall (herpetologist)		
Herbert James Walton		
Harry Frederick Whitchurch		
Alfred Whitmore		
Thomas Williams (Kennington MP)		
