= Chuckerbutty =

Surname list

Chuckerbutty is a surname. Notable people with the surname include:

- Oliphant Chuckerbutty (1884–1960), English composer and organist
- Soorjo Coomar Goodeve Chuckerbutty (c. 1826 – 1874), Indian surgeon
