= Duka (surname) =

Duka is a surname. Notable people with the surname include:

- Armand Duka (born 1962), Albanian businessman
- Dilly Duka (born 1989), American soccer player
- Dominik Duka (1943–2025), Czech Catholic archbishop
- Theodore Duka (1825–1908), Hungarian army officer
- Duka de Kádár family, a Hungarian noble family of Aromanian-Serb descent

== See also ==
- Djuka, given name also spelled Duka
- Duka, a village in Hungary
