= Bishnupada Mukerjee =

Indian pharmacologist and orthopedic surgeon

- Born: 1 March 1903; Barrackpore, North 24 Parganas, West Bengal, India
- Died: 30 July 1979 (aged 76); Calcutta, West Bengal, India
- Education: University of Michigan
- Occupations: Pharmacologist, Orthopedic surgeon
- Awards: Padma Shri; Griffith Memorial Prize; Nilmony Brahmachari Medal; Asutosh Mookerjee Medal; Indian Science Congress Medal; Asiatic Society Barclay Medal; Squibb International Award; HK Sen Memorial Medal; Acharya PC Ray Medal; INSA Shree Dhanwantari Medal

Bishnupada Mukerjee (1 March 1903, Barrackpore, India – 30 July 1979, Calcutta, India) or Bishnupada Mukhopadhyaya was an Indian pharmacologist and orthopedic surgeon, known for his contributions in the fields of pharmacological research and standardization of drugs in India. The Government of India honoured him in 1962, with the award of Padma Shri, the fourth-highest Indian civilian award for his services to the nation.

== Biography ==
Bishnupada Mukerjee was born on 1 March 1903 at Barrackpore in the North 24 Parganas district of the Indian state of West Bengal. He did his early schooling at Barrackpore village school and Kolkata to pass the matriculation with a scholarship for further education. He passed the Intermediate examination from Scottish Church College, Kolkata with 13th rank at the University of Calcutta and joined the Calcutta Medical College to secure the degree of Bachelor of Medicine with first rank and honours in pharmacology, midwifery and Gynecology in 1927.

Calcutta School of Tropical Medicine

Mukerjee did his residency under Green-Armytage at Eden Hospital for 18 months and moved to Calcutta School of Tropical Medicine where he worked under Sir Ram Nath Chopra who is reported to have successfully persuaded Mukerjee to turn to research by abandoning his medical practice. In 1930, he took up the post of an assistant secretary to the Drug Enquiry Commission and assisted the commission in preparing a report advocating for drug standardization and pharmacy control. From 1931 to 1933, he worked at the Calcutta School of Tropical Medicine on research on indigenous drugs when he received a Fellowship from the Rockefeller Foundation for research on vegetable drugs in China, America and Japan. He moved to Peking Union Medical College where he worked under renowned pharmacologist, H. B. Van Dyke. In 1936, he obtained a D.Sc. degree from the University of Michigan, the first doctoral degree awarded by the university in pharmacology.

Mukerjee continued his studies at the University of London under Joshua Harold Burn, at the National Institute for Medical Research, Hampstead under Sir Henry Dale and at the Ludwig-Maximilians-Universität München under Geheimrat professor W. Straub. In 1937, he returned to India to be reunited with Ram Nath Chopra at the All India Institute of Hygiene and Public Health in their newly formed Biochemical Standardization Laboratory and became the director of the institution in 1941 at Kolkata and later at Kasauli. In 1947, he was appointed as the director of Central Drugs Laboratory and held the dual responsibility of Pharmacognosy Laboratory as well for three years. During this period, when he put forward the concept of an exclusive laboratory for drug research, the CSIR took it up further to establish the Central Drug Research Institute (CDRI), Lucknow with assistance from Edward Mellanby and Mukerjee was appointed as the first permanent director of the institute.

Mukerjee worked at CDRI till 1963 and moved to Chittaranjan National Cancer Research Centre, Kolkata as its director to hold the post till his retirement in 1968. Post retirement, he worked as a visiting lecturer and scientist at the Department of Biochemistry of the University of Calcutta and as a consultant to the Kolkata office of the Ford Foundation.

Bishnupada Mukerjee died on 30 July 1979, at the age of 76.

== Legacy ==
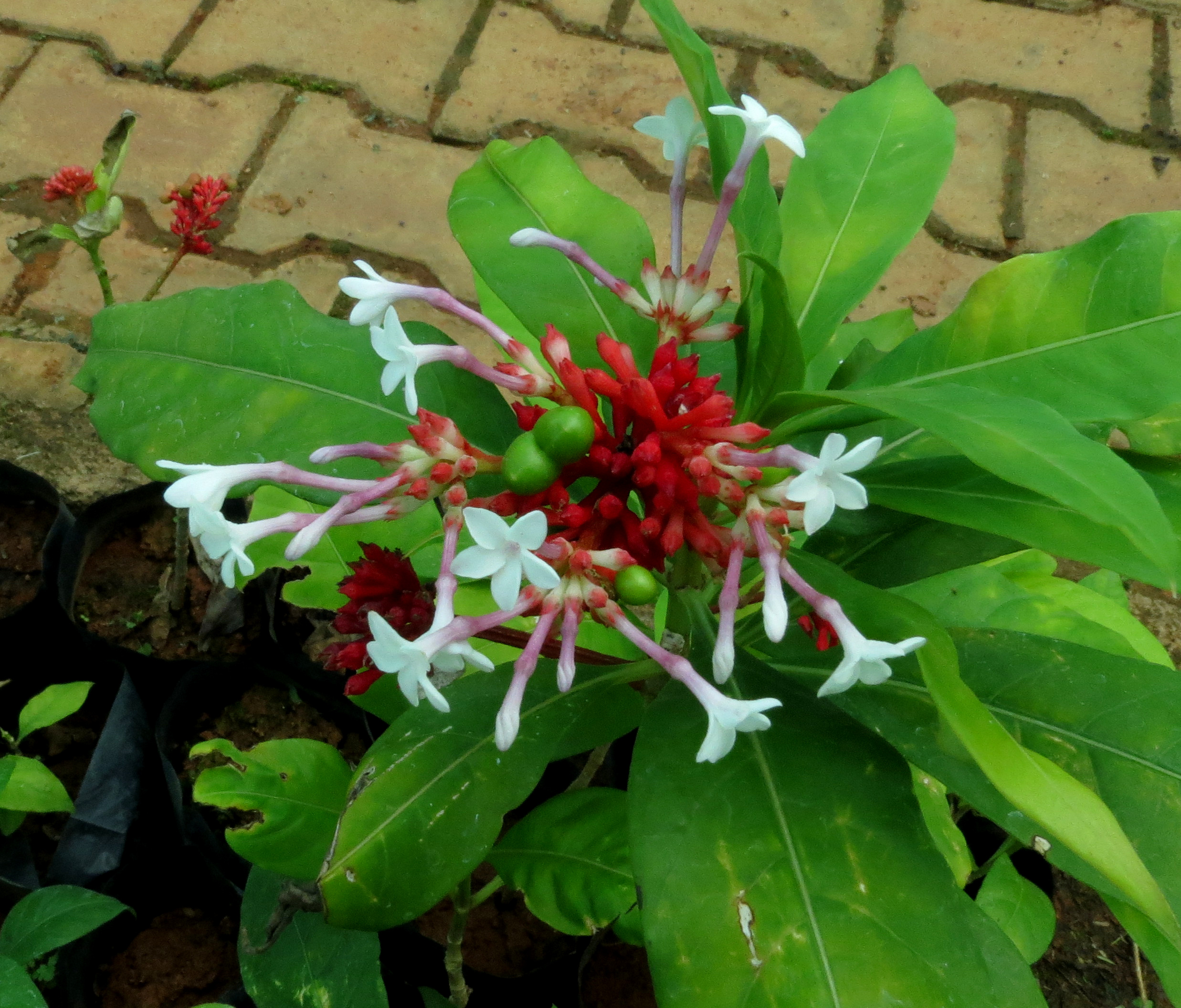
Rauwolfia Serpentina

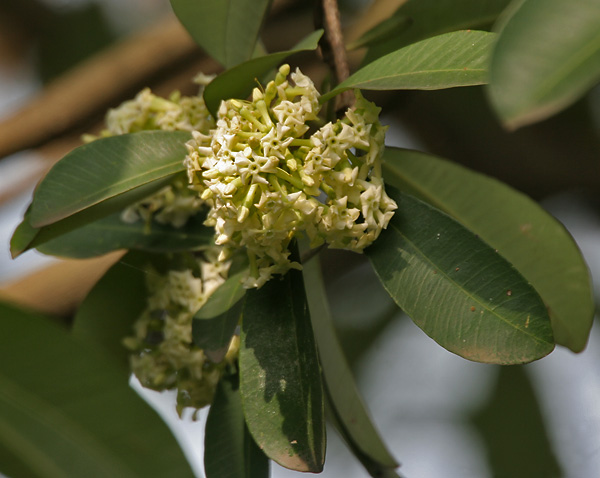
Alstonia scholaris

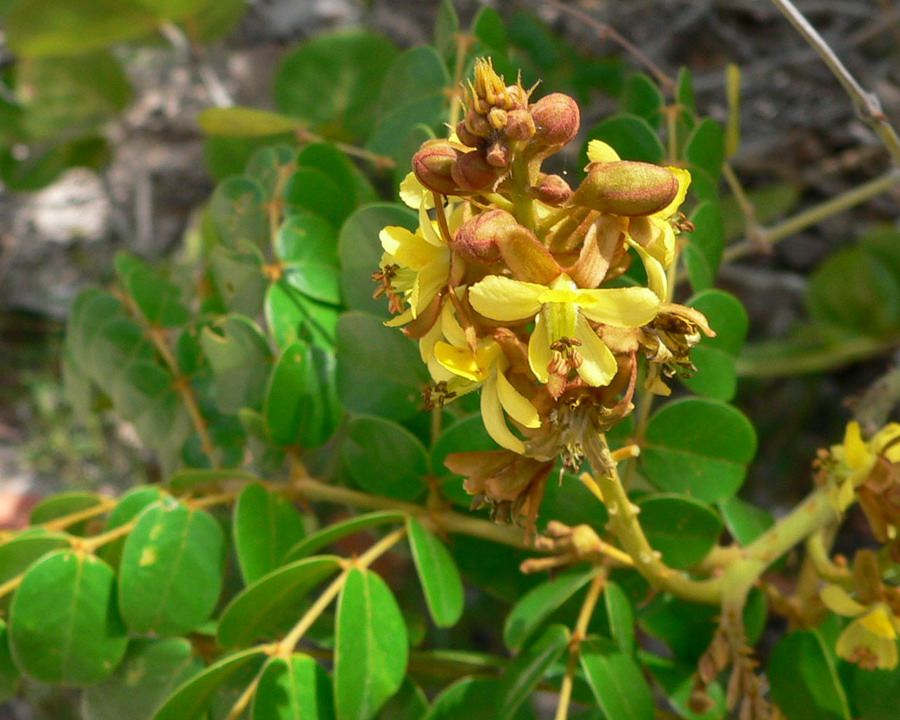
Caesalpinia

Bishnupada Mukerjee's contributions covered the fields of pharmacology, toxicology, endocrinology, physiology, chemotherapy and standardization of procedures besides his administrative contributions. He was credited with efforts in standardization of drugs by introducing modern protocols of biological standardization and assays. His efforts are also known for putting control measures in place for controlling the pharmaceutical institutions which he worked on during his assignment with the Drugs Enquiry Committee. The Central Drug Research Institute at Lucknow was his brainchild and the institute helped in promoting pharmacological research in India. He was also instrumental in the establishment of such institutions like Indian Brain Research Association, Indian Biophysical Society and Indian Association for Biological Sciences as well as many research laboratories. His contributions led to the publication of Indian Pharmaceutical Codex, a reference book of Indian vegetable drugs. He was the chairman of the committee which published the second edition of Indian Pharmacopoeia in 1966.

Mukerjee did extensive research on drugs, especially indigenous drugs. His research work with Ram Nath Chopra brought out the first scientific paper on Sarpagandha (Rauvolfia serpentina) and its medical properties. His research on the medicinal values of Alstonia scholaris, Caesalpinia bonducella and snake venom are well documented. His research on posterior pituitary hormones and their effects on liver fat helped initiate a research program at School of Medicine, University of Toronto, the findings of which explained the lipotropic actions of choline, betaine and methionine. He also did research on dextrorotatory hydroocupridine derivatives, anterior pituitary extracts and cyanide poisoning. He devised methods for determining the prothrombin time, for prolongation of insulin effect and for biological standardization of liver extracts. His research findings were published by way of over 300 research papers in national and international journals.

Mukerjee was the general secretary of the Indian Science Congress Association from 1946 to 1952 and presided the 49th Congress in 1962. He was a member of the council, foreign secretary and vice president of the Indian National Science Academy for various tenures. He served as the president of the Indian Pharmaceutical Association and Indian Pharmaceutical Congress Association and was a member of the Expert Committee on International Pharmacopoeia of the World Health Organization. He was a member of the first Pharmacy Council of India when it was constituted in 1949 and served as a member of several government committees and sub committees related to public health.

== Awards and honours ==
Mukerjee received two awards in 1938, the Griffith Memorial Prize and the Nilmony Brahmachari Gold Medal of the University of Calcutta. In 1940, he was awarded the Asutosh Mookerjee Memorial Award of the Indian Science Congress Association and the Indian National Science Academy elected him as their fellow in 1943. The Indian Science Congress Medal reached him in 1951 followed by the Barclay Medal of the Asiatic Society in 1954. The Government of India awarded him the civilian honour of Padma Shri in 1962. He was also a recipient of the Squibb International Award from Bristol-Myers Squibb in 1962, H. K. Sen Memorial Medal from the Institution of Chemists (India) in 1963 and Acharya P. C. Ray Medal from the Indian Pharmaceutical Association in 1976. The Indian National Science Academy honoured him with Shree Dhanwantari Medal in 1976. He was a member or Fellow of several science academies and institutions such as Asiatic Society, American Society for Pharmacology and Experimental Therapeutics, American Pharmaceutical Association Society of Pharmacognosy, Physiological Society of India, Institution of Chemists (India) and Indian Pharmaceutical Association among others. The Council for Scientific and Industrial Research through CDRI has instituted an annual lecture, Dr Bishnupada Mukerjee Memorial Lecture, in honour of the scientist.

The Government of India awarded him Padma Bhushan, the third highest Indian civilian award, in 1971.

== See also ==
- All India Institute of Hygiene and Public Health
- Alstonia scholaris
- Joshua Harold Burn
- Caesalpinia bonduc
- Central Drug Research Institute
- Chittaranjan National Cancer Institute
- Ram Nath Chopra
- Sir Henry Dale
- Indian National Science Academy
- Indian Science Congress Association
- Pharmacy Council of India
- Rauvolfia serpentina
