= George Abraham Grierson =

Irish administrator and linguist in British India (1851-1941)

Sir George Abraham Grierson OM KCIE
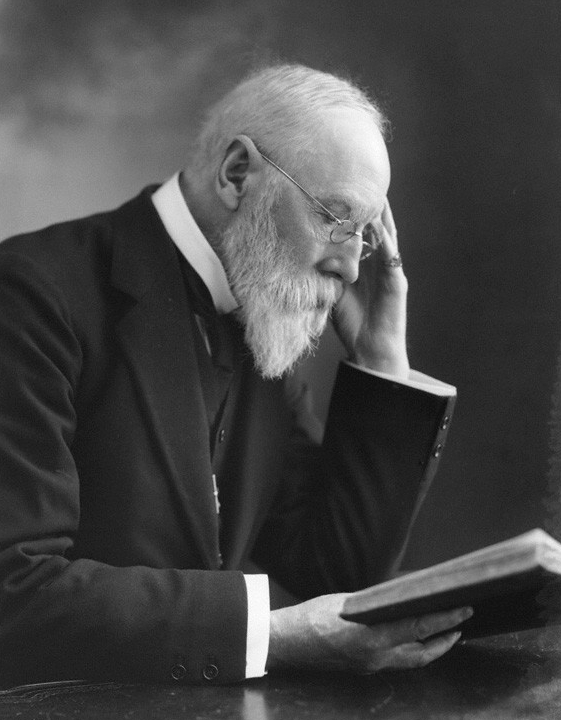
- Grierson in June 1920, photo from the National Portrait Gallery, London.
- Born: 7 January 1851; Dublin, United Kingdom of Great Britain and Ireland
- Died: 9 March 1941 (aged 90); Camberley, England
- Occupation: Linguist
- Known for: Linguistic Survey of India

Sir George Abraham Grierson OM KCIE FBA (7 January 1851 – 9 March 1941) was an Irish administrator and linguist in British India. He worked in the Indian Civil Service but an interest in philology and linguistics led him to pursue studies in the languages and folklore of India during his postings in Bengal and Bihar. He published numerous studies in the journals of learned societies and wrote several books during his administrative career but proposed a formal linguistic survey at the Oriental Congress in 1886 at Vienna. The Congress recommended the idea to the British Government and he was appointed superintendent of the newly created Linguistic Survey of India in 1898.

Grierson continued the work until 1928, surveying people across the British Indian territory, documenting spoken languages by recording voices and written forms. He was responsible for documenting information on 179 languages, defined by him through a test of mutual unintelligibility, and 544 dialects which he placed in five language families. He published the findings of the Linguistic Survey in a series that consisted of 19 volumes.

== Biography ==
Grierson was born in Glenageary, County Dublin. His father and grandfather (George Grierson) were well-known Dublin printers and publishers. His mother Isabella was the daughter of Henry Ruxton of Ardee. He was educated at St. Bees School, and from the age of 13 at Shrewsbury. He then went up to Trinity College, Dublin, where he was a student of mathematics. Grierson qualified for the Indian Civil Service in 1871 ranking twenty-eighth for the year. He continued studies at Trinity College for two probationary years where he was influenced by Robert Atkinson, professor of oriental languages. He took a deep interest in languages, won prizes for studies in Sanskrit and Hindustani before leaving for the Bengal Presidency in 1873. First posted to Bankipore (Patna) in Bihar, he became Magistrate and Collector at Patna and still later in 1896, Opium Agent for Bihar. He married Lucy Elizabeth Jean, daughter of Maurice Henry Fitzgerald Collis, a Dublin surgeon, in 1880 but they had no children.

Grierson attended the Oriental Congress in 1886 at Vienna and proposed the idea of a formal linguistic in India. Grierson was a delegate of the Royal Asiatic Society along with Dr Theodor Duka, Albert Terrien de Lacouperie, Cecil Bendall, and R. N. Cust. At the Congress it was noted that the number of Indian languages was unknown with estimates varying from 20 to 250. A resolution was passed urging the Government to undertake a 'deliberate systematic survey of the languages of India.' The signatories included Karl Bühler, Max Müller, Monier Williams and Grierson. The recommendation was made to the British Government and in 1898 he was appointed Superintendent of the newly formed Linguistic Survey of India. For the survey a standard set of materials was sought. He had government officials collect material for every language, dialect, and subdialect, going from village to village and sampling across the classes and sexes. He provided forms and instructional material to his correspondents. He sought a version of the parable of the prodigal son, oral narratives and a predefined list of 241 words and phrases (this list had been made by Sir George Campbell in 1866). The parable was chosen because 'it contains the three personal pronouns, most of the cases found in the declension of nouns, and the present, past, and future tenses of the verb'. The survey classified the languages of 290,000,000 people. In 1900 he moved to England "for convenience of consulting European libraries and scholars". By 1903 most of the data had come in and he retired from the Indian Civil Service. He spent the following thirty years editing the enormous amount of material gathered and worked briefly in collaboration with the Norwegian linguist Sten Konow (who contributed to volume III on Tibetan languages). On 8 May 1928 the completion of the Linguistic Survey of India was celebrated at the Criterion Restaurant by the Royal Asiatic Society of Great Britain and Ireland with Lord Birkenhead proposing the toast.

Grierson published scholarly works throughout his career: on the dialects and peasant life of Bihar, on Hindi literature, on bhakti, and on linguistics. His contemporaries noted both his lack of sympathy for Advaita Vedanta, which he regarded as "pandit religion," and his "warm appreciation of the monotheistic devotion of the country folk". He also published on literary texts and writers, including a paper on Kalidasa in 1877.

Most of Grierson's later work deals with linguistics. In a celebratory account of his life, F. W. Thomas and R. L. Turner refer to the extensive publications of the Linguistic Survey of India as "a great Imperial museum, representing and systematically classifying the linguistic botany of India".

Grierson died in Camberley, Surrey, England at Rathfarnham, the house he built and named after his grandfather's castle in Dublin.

== Honours ==
- 1894: Appointed CIE
- 1912: Knighted as a Knight Commander of the Order of the Indian Empire (KCIE)
- 1917–1939: Fellow of the British Academy
- 1927: President of the Gypsy Lore Society
- 1928 Birthday Honours: Appointed to the Order of Merit (OM)
- 1929: Awarded the Sir William Jones Gold Medal and the Campbell Memorial Medal from the Royal Asiatic Society of Bengal (now The Asiatic Society).
- 1902: Honorary Doctorate of Letters (D.Litt.) from the University of Dublin.

Grierson was an honorary member of the Nagari Pracharini Sabha at Benares. He was an honorary fellow of the Royal Asiatic Society of Bengal, the Bihar and Orissa Research Society, the Modern Language Association, Linguistic Society of India, and the Bangiya Sahitya Parishat. He received several other honorary degrees from the universities of Halle, Cambridge, Oxford, and Bihar. A literary award of India, the Dr. George Grierson Award, was named in his honour in 1989.

== Selected publications ==
Grierson was a prolific writer. On his 85th birthday, an article was contributed in his honour and published by the School of Oriental Studies which included a list of Grierson's publications occupying 22 pages.

- Grierson, George Abraham (1898–1928). Linguistic Survey of India. Calcutta: Government Press.
- Grierson, George Abraham (1885). Bihar Peasant Life, Being a Discursive Catalogue of the Surroundings of the People of That Province, With Many Illustrations From Photographs Taken By the Author. Prepared Under Orders of the Government of Bengal. London: Trübner & Co.
- Grierson, George Abraham. Seven Grammars of the Dialects and Subdialects of the Bihari Language (1883–87) 3 vols. ISBN 81-7835-451-9
- Grierson, Sir George Abraham (1906). The Pisaca languages of north-western India. The Royal asiatic Society, London.
- Grierson George Abraham, Linguistic Survey of India, 11 Vols. in 19 Parts
- Grierson, George Abraham (1916). A Dictionary of the Kashmiri Language. Calcutta: Asiatic Society of Bengal.
- Grierson, George Abraham (1920). Ishkashmi, Zebaki and Yazghulami. An Account of Three Eranian Dialects. London: Royal Asiatic Society.
- Grierson, Sir George; Barnett, Lionel D. Barnett (1920). Lalla-Vakyani. London: Royal Asiatic Society.
- The Lay of Alha: A Saga of Rajput Chivalry as Sung by Minstrels of Northern India, SAMP early 20th-century Indian books project, Editor Sir George Abraham Grierson, Translated by William Waterfield, Oxford University Press, H. Milford, 1923
- Grierson, George Abraham 1909. Gleanings from the Bhakta-Mala. Journal of the Royal Asiatic Society: 607–644.
- Grierson, George Abraham 1910. Gleanings from the Bhakta-Mala. Journal of the Royal Asiatic Society: 269–306.
- Grierson, George Abraham 1910. Gleanings from the Bhakta-Mala. Journal of the Royal Asiatic Society: 87–109.
- Grierson, George Abraham, 2007, Kachhi Ji Bhasa VIgnanik Vadhod (ક્છી જ્ી ભાસા વ̃ગ્ નાનીક્ વાધૉડ઼્), Translated in Kachhi Language from Linguistic Survey of India, Volume 8, Part 1 (1919) by Manilal Gala, Vadhod PIrkasan: 1–122.

== See also ==
- Herbert Hope Risley

== Sources ==
- Thomas, F. W. and R. L. Turner. 1941. George Abraham Grierson 1851–1941. London: Humphrey Milford Amen House, E.C.
- Thomas, F. W., and R. L. Turner. 1942. George Abraham Grierson 1851–1941. Proceedings of the British Academy, 28:283–306.
