= Novis =

Novis is a surname. Notable people with this surname include:

- Donald Novis (1906–1966), English-born American actor and tenor
- Emile Novis, pseudonym of Simone Weil
- Thomas Shephard Novis (1874–1962), British surgeon
- Tony Novis (1906–1997), English rugby union player
