= Doris Mortimer =

British stockbroker (1898–1947)

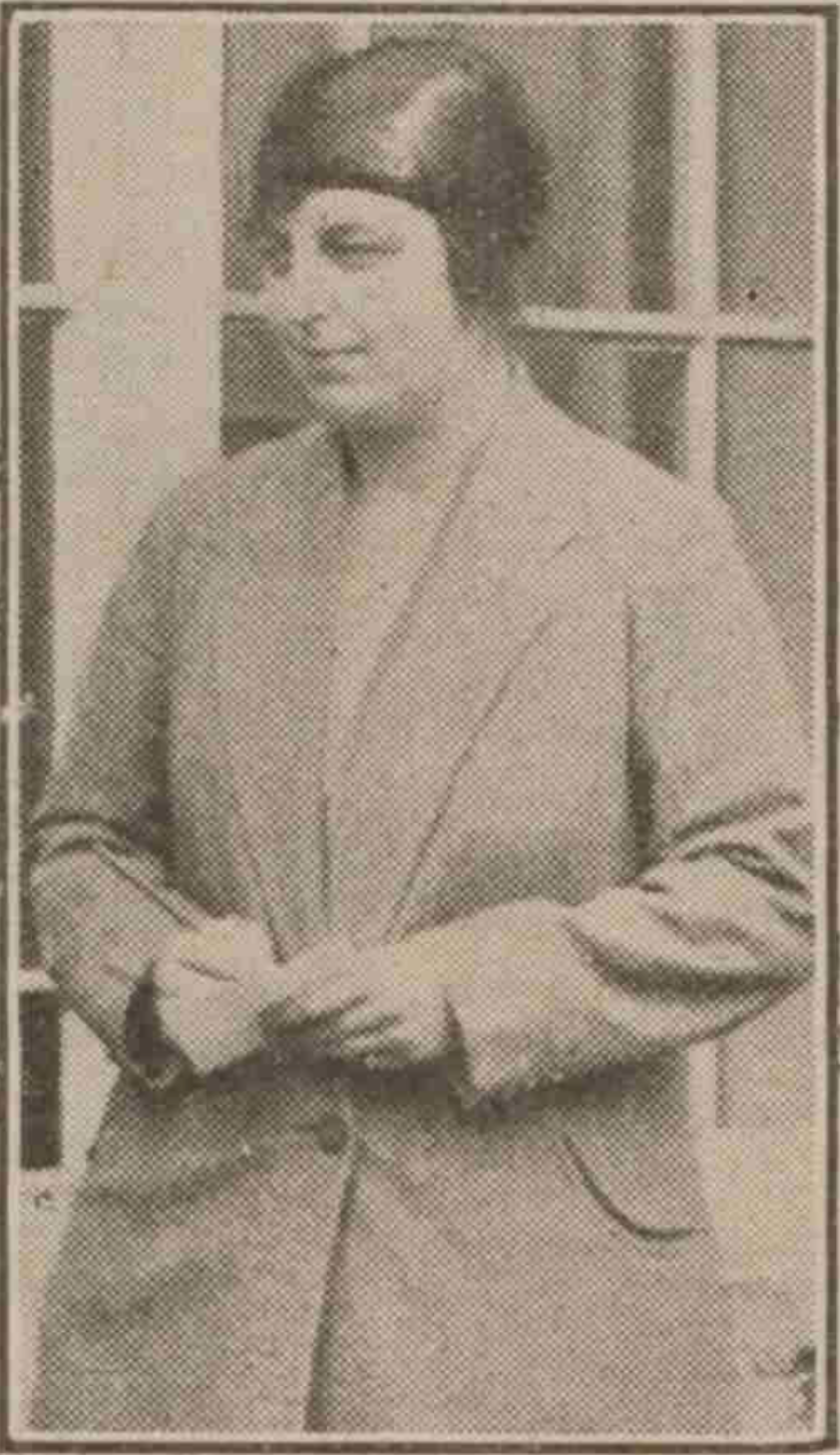
- Doris Mortimer, 1924
- Born: 28 July 1898; Exeter, United Kingdom
- Died: 16 February 1946 (aged 47)
- Occupation: Stockbroker
- Known for: One of the first women Stockbrokers

Doris Ellen Mortimer (28 July 1898 – 16 February 1947) was a British stockbroker. While not the first woman stockbroker in the UK, in 1923 she became the first woman to be admitted to a British stockbroking association or exchange.

== Early life and education ==
Mortimer was born in Exeter, Devon, to Thomas and Jessy Mortimer. Her grandfather, William Mortimer, was the founder of the stockbroking firm W. Mortimer & Sons, established in 1842, and based at 14 Bedford Circus, Exeter. After the outbreak of World War I and the enlistment of the male staff Mortimer left school to assist in the office, and a short time after the war ended she succeeded her father as senior partner.

She was cousin of literary critic Raymond Mortimer.

== Career ==
Women were deliberately excluded from stockbroking during the time period that Mortimer began working in the industry. Exchanges were perceived as gentleman's clubs by their members well into the 20th century—the London Stock Exchange would not accept its first female members until 1973, for example. British women in stockbroking had to instead work in so-called "outside houses" (or by themselves, as "outside agents") – either by relying on male exchange members to conduct trades on their behalf (as Amy Bell did), or by specialising in financial products which were not traded on exchanges (as Gordon Holmes did).

The Exeter exchange became the first British stock exchange with a female member in 1923 when it admitted Mortimer. The feminist newspaper The Vote called her "the only 'inside' woman broker in this country."

== Later life ==
Mortimer's later life and career is poorly documented. In the 1939 England & Wales Register, Mortimer's occupation is listed as "Stocks Shares Broker Incapacitated W.V.S.". At the time of her father’s death, her brother Thomas Glanville Mortimer, and colleague Walter John Way, were also made partners. However, Thomas died in 1927, and Walter in 1940. The offices of W Mortimer & Sons in Bedford Circus were destroyed in the Exeter Blitz of 4 May 1942, and it is not clear if the company was still operating by this point or continued past this event.

She never married or had children, and lived at the Mortimer family home at 26-27 St Leonard's Road, Exeter, until her death at the age of 48. She left behind an estate worth £19,830 (roughly equivalent to £800,000 in 2020), and was survived by her widowed mother.

== See also ==
- Oonah Keogh – The first woman to be admitted to Ireland's national stock exchange in Dublin, in 1925
