= Margaret White =

Margaret White may refer to:

- Margaret White (judge) (born 1943), Australian judge
- Margaret White (meteorologist) (1889–1977), British meteorologist and industrial researcher
- Margaret White (Carrie), fictional character in Stephen King's novel Carrie
- Margaret Bourke-White (1904–1971), American photographer
- Peggy White (1924-1997), American pioneer in women's squash
- Margaret Moore White (1902–1983), English gynaecologist

== See also ==
- White (surname)
