= Vivian Green-Armytage =

British gynaecologist

Vivian Bartley Green-Armytage FRCS, FRCOG
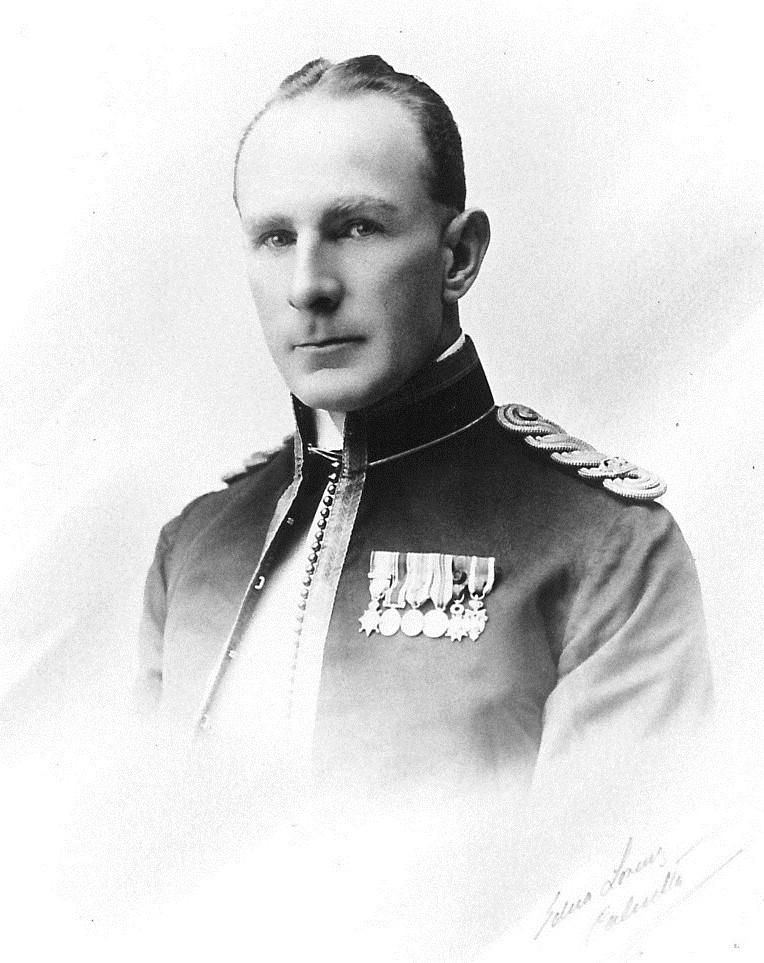
- Born: 14 August 1882; Clifton, Bristol, England
- Died: 11 April 1961 (aged 78); Chelsea, County of London, England
- Education: Clifton College, Bristol University
- Known for: Advocate of vaginal hysterectomy, RCOG Visiting Scholarship
- Medical career
- Profession: Obstetrician, gynaecologist
- Awards: Montefiore Surgical Medal

Vivian Bartley Green-Armytage FRCP, FRCS, FRCOG, (14 August 1882 – 11 April 1961) was a British gynaecologist. He was noted for his progressive views, his service to Indian gynaecology and obstetrics, and his distinguished service in the Royal Army Medical Corps during the First World War.

== Early life ==
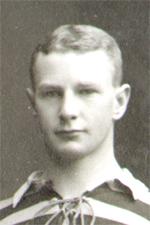
Vivian Bartley Green-Armytage in rugby clothing

Vivian Green-Armytage was born at Clifton, England, on 14 August 1882 to Alfred Green-Armytage, a solicitor, and the novelist and historian Amy Julia Green-Armytage (nee Bartley). His elder brother was Paul Green-Armytage, who would play first-class cricket. He was educated at Clifton College and then at the University of Bristol and Bristol Royal Infirmary followed by post-graduate study in Paris.

In 1901–1902, he was a member of Clifton Rugby Football Club.

== Indian Medical Service ==
Green-Armytage was commissioned lieutenant in the Indian Medical Service (IMS) in 1907 and promoted to captain in 1910. Also in 1910 he won the Montefiore Surgical Medal at the Royal Army Medical College. He was the resident medical officer and surgeon at the Eden Hospital and the Presidency General Hospital in Calcutta from 1911 to 1922.

He co-authored the fifth edition of Birch's Management and Medical Treatment of Children in India with Charles Robert Mortimer Green which was published by Thacker Spink & Co., in Calcutta in 1913. The book was originally published by Henry Goodeve as Hints for the General Management of Children in India in the absence of Professional Advice (1844).

== First World War ==
His work in India was interrupted by the First World War in which he served as an officer in the Royal Army Medical Corps. He was mentioned three times in despatches and also received the Mons Star, the Croix de Chevalier de la Légion d'Honneur, and the Order of the White Eagle of Serbia with Crossed Swords, in 1917.

== Professor in India ==
After his return from war service, Green-Armytage was promoted to major in the IMS in 1919, and finally to lieutenant colonel in 1927 before retiring in 1933.

He was professor of gynaecology and obstetrics at the Eden Hospital from 1922 to 1933. Before leaving India, Green-Armytage received a volume of his addresses that was prepared and published by the medical women of India as a symbol of their appreciation for his service.

In 1927, he married Mary Vera Moir-Byres née Gibson in Rangoon.

== Later life ==
On his return to England, Green-Armytage practised as a consulting gynaecologist and held appointments with the West London, British Postgraduate, Italian, and Tropical Diseases Hospitals. He was an advocate of the vaginal hysterectomy which he had mastered in India. He was vice-president of the Royal College of Obstetricians and Gynaecologists from 1949 to 1952 for whom he endowed a travel fellowship and lecture.

He invented the Green Armytage forceps which are used to control excessive bleeding after a caesarean section.

In 1958, he was appointed Officier de la Légion d'Honneur.

He was a member of the Oriental Club and the East India Club. His hobbies included the classics and the history of medicine.

== Death and legacy ==
Vivian Green-Armytage died in Chelsea, London, on 11 April 1961. The ribbon bar for his medals is in the collection of the Royal College of Obstetricians and Gynaecologists.

== Selected publications ==
- Birch's Management and Medical Treatment of Children in India. 5th edition. Thacker, Spink & Co., Calcutta, 1913. (With C.R.M. Green)
- Labour-room Clinics, Being Aids to Midwifery Practice. Thacker, Spink & Co., Calcutta, 1913. (Lectures delivered at the Eden Hospital)
- Tropical Midwifery: Labour-room Clinics. Thacker, Spink & Co., Calcutta, 1928.
- The Management of Impaired Fertility. Oxford University Press, London, 1962. (With Margaret Moore White)
