= Holy Trinity, Paddington =

Former church in Paddington, London, England

Coordinates: 51°31′3.09″N 0°10′55.43″W

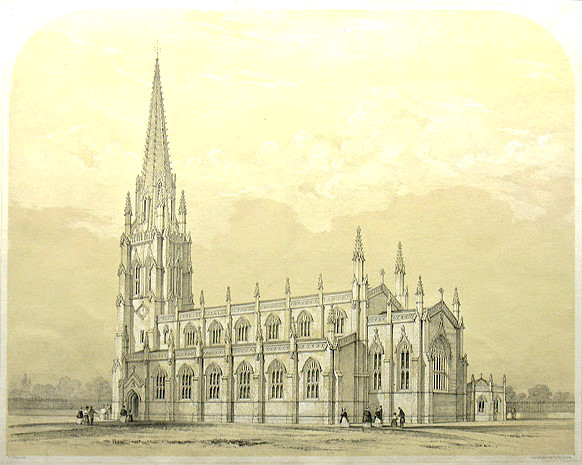
The Church of the Holy Trinity, Bishop's Road, Paddington. Artist: T. Bury. Lithograph, c. 1845.

Holy Trinity was a church that once stood on the corner of Bishop's Road, now Bishop's Bridge Road, and Westbourne Terrace, in Paddington, London. It was built 1844–46 to a design by Thomas Cundy.

Before 1873, the church of Saint Paul, Harrow Road, was constructed as a chapel-of-ease to Holy Trinity, becoming a separate parish in 1873. The church was bombed in 1940, and in 1947 the parish was re-united with Holy Trinity, becoming known as Holy Trinity with Saint Paul's, Paddington.

In the early 1930s, Oliphant Chuckerbutty (organist 1909–1948) made Holy Trinity a well-known centre of music, with frequent performances of choral and orchestral music, both old and new. He and guest organists gave regular recitals on what The Musical Times described as "the fine Norman and Beard organ" there.

The church was closed 1971 after being declared unsafe, and the spire was demolished the following year. The church was left for a while, and various clubs used the crypt. Worship continued during that period in the community hall. The parish of Holy Trinity was amalgamated with Saint James, Sussex Gardens in March 1981 to form the larger parish of Saint James, Paddington.

The rest of the church building was demolished in 1984 and subsequently the site has been occupied by the Holy Trinity Flats since 1986.

The parish records, including baptism and marriage registers, are held by the London Metropolitan Archives.
