= Richard Hillebrand Morgan =

Ceylonese lawyer

- Alma mater: Royal College, Colombo
- Military career
- Allegiance: Ceylon
- Branch: Ceylon Defence Force
- Service years: 1881 - 1908
- Rank: Lieutenant Colonel
- Unit: Ceylon Light Infantry Volunteers
- Commands: Ceylon Light Infantry Volunteers
- Awards: Volunteer Officers' Decoration
- Other work: Barrister

Lieutenant Colonel Richard Hillebrand Morgan, VD, CLIV was a Ceylonese lawyer. He was the commanding officer of the Ceylon Light Infantry Volunteers.

Born to Sir Richard Francis Morgan, 13th Queen's Advocate of Ceylon and acting Chief Justice of Ceylon, Richard Hillebrand Morgan was educated at the Colombo Academy and the S. Thomas' College. In 1858 he traveled to England for studies at Cheltenham College, in 1863 he entered St John's College, Cambridge, where he graduated with BA in 1866. In 1868, he was admitted as a barrister from the Lincoln's Inn. He returned to Ceylon and became an advocate and established his legal practice. He served as the acting police magistrate of Colombo and district judge of Colombo. He was a member of council of legal education.

Having served with the Cambridge University Rifle Volunteers, he was commissioned as a first lieutenant in the Ceylon Light Infantry Volunteer Corp. He was promoted to captain in 1886, awarded the honorary rank of major in 1895 and confirmed in the substantive rank of major in 1897 and commanded the Diamond Jubilee contingent from Ceylon. He was promoted to lieutenant colonel in 1904 and was appointed commanding officer in January 1905 and served till February 1908. He was awarded the Volunteer Officers' Decoration and the Queen Victoria Diamond Jubilee Medal.

In 1868 he married Charlotta Carolina Johanna Coqui, daughter of Adolph Coqui, a German-born merchant and financier who served on the Legislative Council of Natal; Gordon Holmes was his niece by marriage. His sister married Lieutenant Colonel Sir Hector van Cuylenburg, who served as his second-in-command. He was a member of the Ceylon Turf Club and the Ceylon Agricultural Society.
