= Henry Goodeve =

British anatomist

Professor Henry Goodeve MRCS FRCS FRCP JP
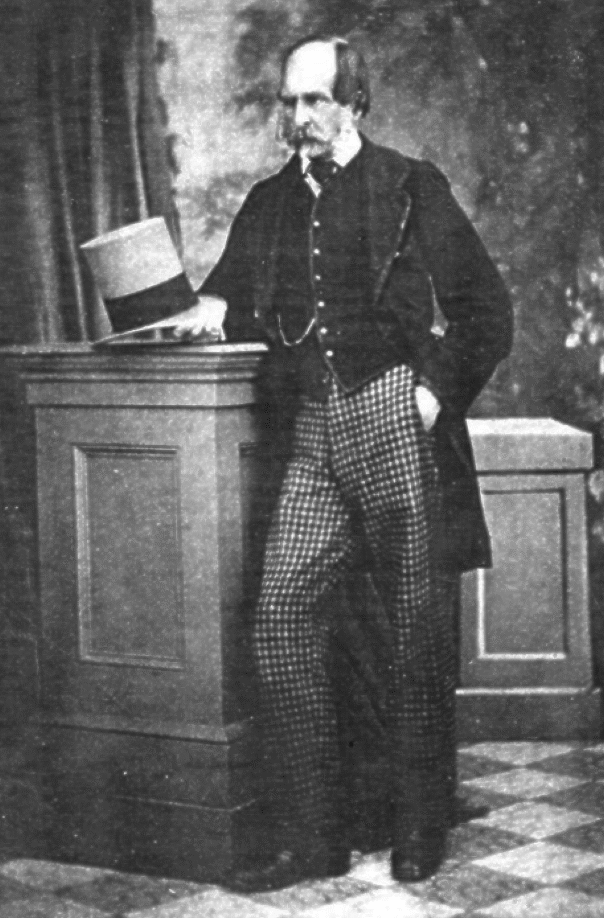
- Henry Goodeve Clifton College, Bristol
- Born: 1807
- Died: 29 September 1884 (aged 76–77)
- Education: St Bartholomew's Hospital; University of Edinburgh
- Known for: Supervision of first Brahmins in medicine, London, 1845
- Relatives: Amy Bell (great-niece)
- Medical career
- Institutions: Calcutta Medical College
- Notable works: Hints for the General Management of Children in India in the Absence of Professional Advice (1844),

Henry Hurry Iles Goodeve FRCS FRCP (1807 – 29 September 1884) was a British physician, surgeon, anatomy lecturer and member of the Bengal Medical Service. He became professor of anatomy and obstetrics at Calcutta Medical College and was later involved in the training of several Indian medical students on his return to the UK.

== Early life ==
Henry Goodeve was born in 1807, in Bury Hall, Alverstoke near Gosport in Hampshire. His father, John Goodeve, was a banker from a Norfolk family, who had married three times. His mother was Elizabeth Hurry.

== Medical career ==
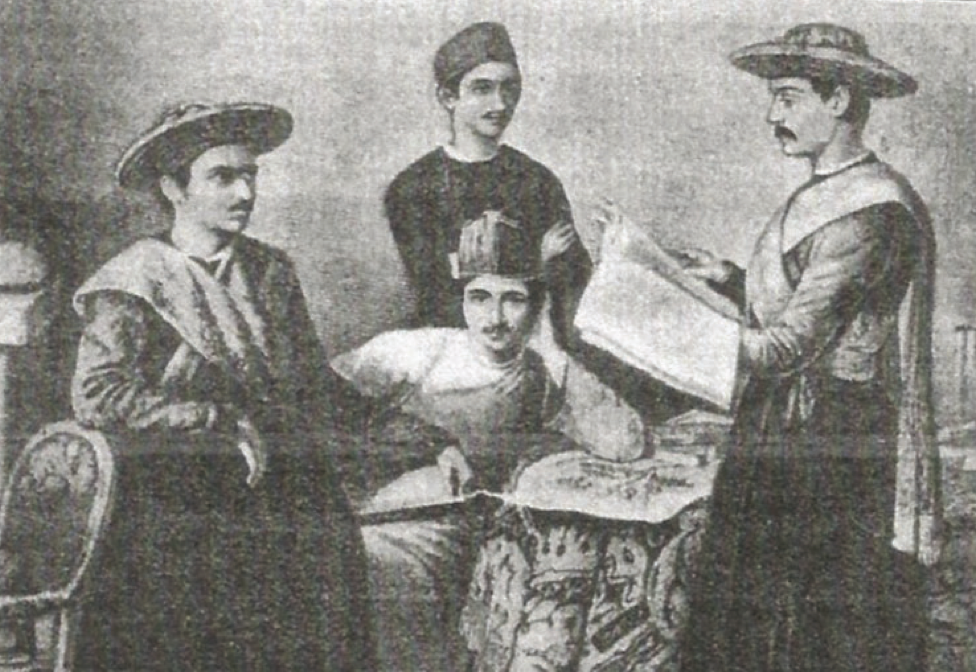
Four Indian medical students in London

Goodeve studied at St Bartholomew's Hospital, and in 1829, graduated in medicine from the University of Edinburgh, following which he lectured in anatomy at Clifton, where his brother, Edward Goodeve taught. He also edited the Athenaeum with his cousin Frederick Denison Maurice.

He joined the Bengal Medical Service in 1831 and was initially posted to Rampur, where he remained for four years. During this time, he took part in the suppression of the Kol rebellion in 1832. In addition, his face became permanently paralysed when his facial nerve was injured following a bullet wound during a tiger hunt.

Following the establishment of the Calcutta Medical College in 1835, he was appointed the first professor of midwifery and anatomy there. He was an active reformer at the college, and created a substantial obstetric practice. His acquaintances included William Brooke O'Shaughnessy and Sir Ronald Martin.

In 1845, ill health resulted in medical retirement and a return to Britain. Using his retirement grant, and with the aim to extend English education to high-caste and other Hindus, he initiated a project for the medical supervision of four Brahmin students at University College London, bringing them to London. Soorjo Coomar Goodeve Chuckerbutty was his favourite student. Chuckerbutty added "Goodeve" to his own name, placing it before his surname. The other three students were Dwarkanath Bose, Bholanath Das Bose and Gopal Chandra Seal. Funding came from a combination of Goodeve's contributions, the East India Company and Dwarkanath Tagore.

Following the outbreak of the Crimean War in 1853, Goodeve volunteered for duty and was appointed inspector of civil hospitals at Renkioi. Here, he worked alongside Sir Spencer Wells.

== Writing ==
As surgeon to the Bengal Medical Service, Goodeve was the author of Hints for the General Management of Children in India in the Absence of Professional Advice (1844) which saw four editions before being taken over for the fifth edition by S.C.G. Chuckerbutty and the sixth by Joseph Ewart. It was renamed Birch's Management and Medical Treatment of Children in India under the authorship of Edward Alfred Birch of the IMS for the seventh edition. A fifth edition of Burch was published under the joint authorship of C.R.M. Green and Vivian Bartley Green-Armytage.

== Later life and death ==
On his return from the Crimean War, Goodeve retired to a house he had designed for himself in Bristol. He became a magistrate, visited county lunatic asylums, reformatories, and industrial schools and joined the Bristol Regiment of Rifle Volunteers as a captain in 1859. In addition, he was appointed director of the Avonmouth Docks and Port and Pier Railway. After 1870, he became president of the Bristol and Clifton Society in Aid of Boarding Out Union Orphans and Deserted Children.

Goodeve and his wife Isabel (née Barlow) never had biological children together, but after Henry's retirement they took in and raised a number of boys and several other children. The 1871 census lists a 12 year old Amy Bell as his great-niece living at Cook's Folly.

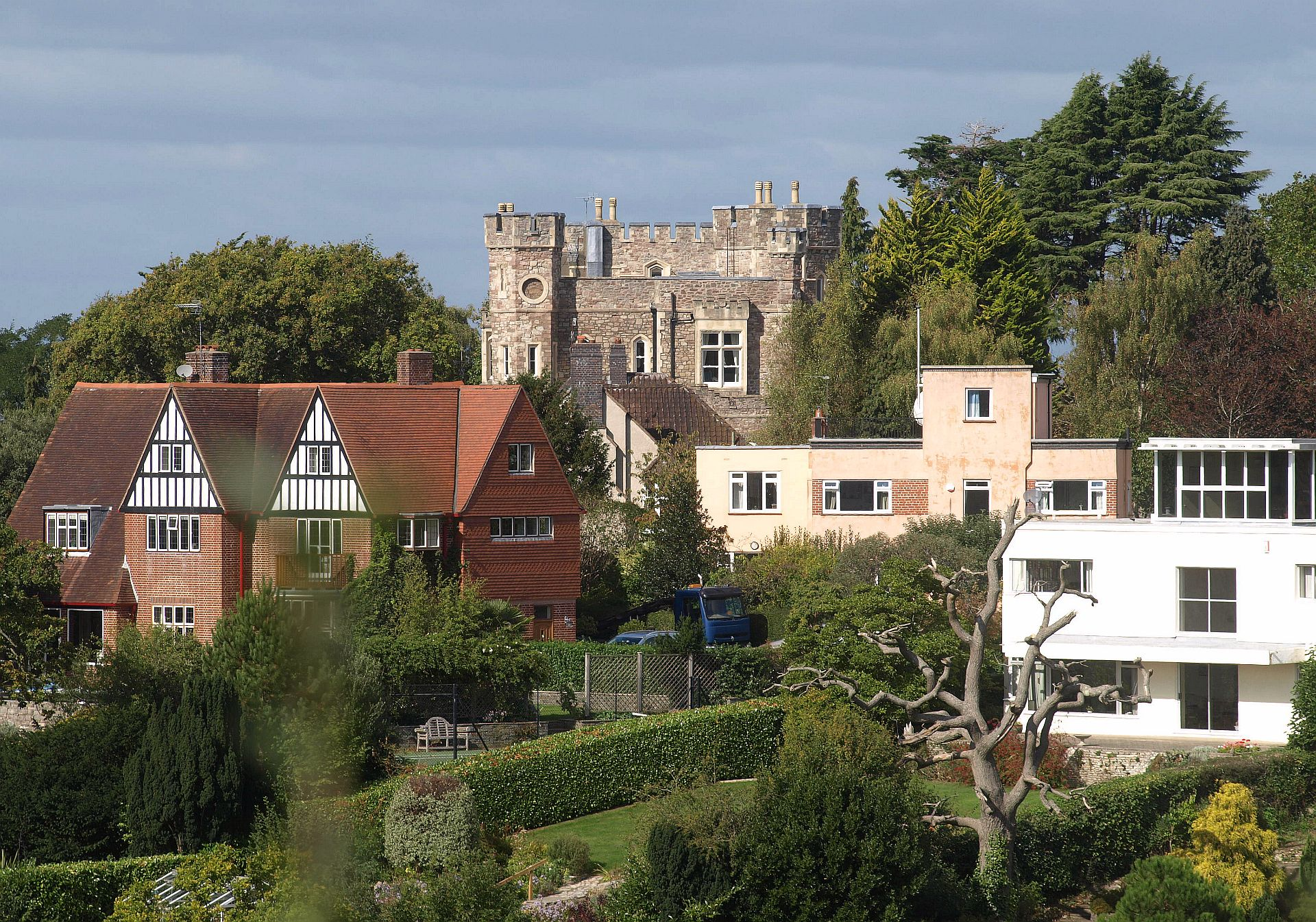
Cook's Folly (centre) in 2014

Henry Goodeve died on 29 September 1884. On 6 May 1891 the joint secretaries to the Goodeve memorial committee put forward Rs.500 for an annual silver medal named the "Goodeve Medal", to be awarded to the student who attains the highest grade in the final M.B. examination.
