= Robert Atkinson (philologist) =

Anglo-Irish academic, philologist and textual scholar (1839–1908)

- Born: April 6, 1839; Gateshead
- Died: January 10, 1908 (aged 68)

Academic work
- Main interests: philologist and textual scholar

Robert Atkinson (6 April 1839 – 10 January 1908) was an Anglo-Irish academic, known as a philologist and textual scholar.

== Life ==
Born at Gateshead on 6 April 1839, he was only child of John Atkinson, who was in business there, by his wife Ann. After education at the Anchorage grammar school close to his home from 1849 to 1856, he matriculated at Trinity College, Dublin, on 2 July 1856. He spent the years 1857 and 1858 mainly at Liège. On his return to Ireland he worked as a schoolmaster in Kilkenny till he won a Trinity College scholarship in 1862. He graduated B.A. on 16 December 1863, M.A. in 1866, and LL.D. in 1869. In 1891 he received the honorary degree of D.Litt.

In 1869 Atkinson became university professor of the Romance languages, and from 1871 till near his death also had the chair of Sanskrit and comparative philology. He taught the Romance languages but also Sanskrit, Tamil, Telugu, and other Indian vernacular languages. He was a Hebrew scholar, and knew Persian, Arabic, and some other languages of Central and Western Asia. In his later years he studied Chinese. Among his students was George Abraham Grierson, who reported Atkinson's practical interest in martial arts including jujutsu.

On 11 January 1876 Atkinson was elected a member of the Royal Irish Academy, and in March became a member of its council. In 1876 he was chosen librarian. Secretary of council from 1878 to 1901, he was then elected president. Meanwhile in 1884 he was Todd professor of the Celtic languages in the academy, delivering an inaugural lecture on Irish lexicography on 13 April 1885. His influence was in the direction of a costly dictionary project, now considered grandiose, and which only saw progress when Carl Marstrander became involved. Around 1899 Atkinson was drawn into a controversy between Douglas Hyde and John Pentland Mahaffy on the value of Early Irish literature, which he rated low. In reporting to the commission on secondary education, he attacked the folkloric elements, in particular (by implication) the Silva Gadelica, and was himself castigated for taking a political position against the line of the Gaelic League.

Atkinson was also a botanist and amateur violinist. In 1907 his health failed. He died on 10 January 1908 at his residence, Clareville, Rathmines, near Dublin, and was buried at Waltonwrays cemetery, Skipton, Yorkshire.

== Works ==
Atkinson was largely interested in the structure of a language, and his teaching anticipated Karl Brugmann. In the Romance languages his major work was a scholarly edition of a Norman-French poem attributed to Matthew Paris, the Vie de Seint Auban (1876). In Coptic studies he was a critic of the work of Urbain Bouriant and Francesco Rossi.

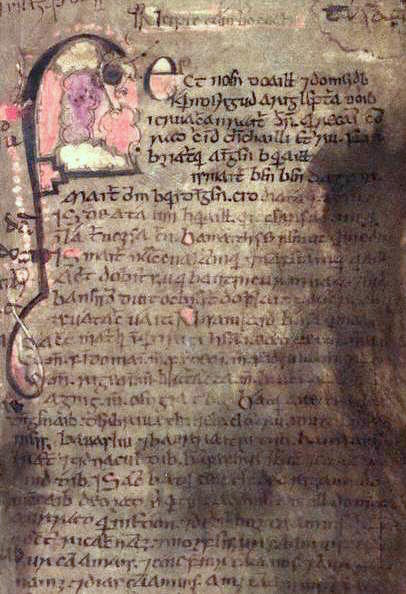
The Book of Leinster, to which Robert Atkinson wrote an introduction for the facsimile edition

His connection with the Royal Irish Academy drew Atkinson into Celtic studies. He edited The Passions and Homilies from the Leabhar Breac, with translation and glossary (Dublin 1887, with the Todd Introductory Lecture on Irish Lexicography), and Geoffrey Keating's Three Shafts of Death (Tri Bior-gaoithe an Bhais, Dublin, 1890), with glossary and appendices on the linguistic forms. He also wrote introductions for several of the manuscript facsimiles issued by the Royal Irish Academy: The Book of Leinster (1880), The Book of Ballymote (1887), and The Yellow Book of Lecan (1896). With John Henry Bernard, he edited for the Henry Bradshaw Society in 1898 The Irish Liber Hymnorum (2 vols). A Glossary to the Ancient Laws of Ireland for the Rolls series, 1901, was criticised by Whitley Stokes. He also wrote a paper On the use of the Subjunctive Mood in Welsh (Trans. Royal Irish Acad. 1894).

== Family ==
On 28 December 1863 Atkinson married, at Gateshead, Hannah Maria, fourth daughter of Thomas and Elizabeth Whitehouse Harbutt of the town. Their only child, Herbert Jefcoate Atkinson, became a civil engineer.

== Notes ==
Attribution

This article incorporates text from a publication now in the public domain: Lee, Sidney, ed. (1912). "Atkinson, Robert". Dictionary of National Biography (2nd supplement). Vol. 1. London: Smith, Elder & Co.
