= Dirom Grey Crawford =

British army surgeon

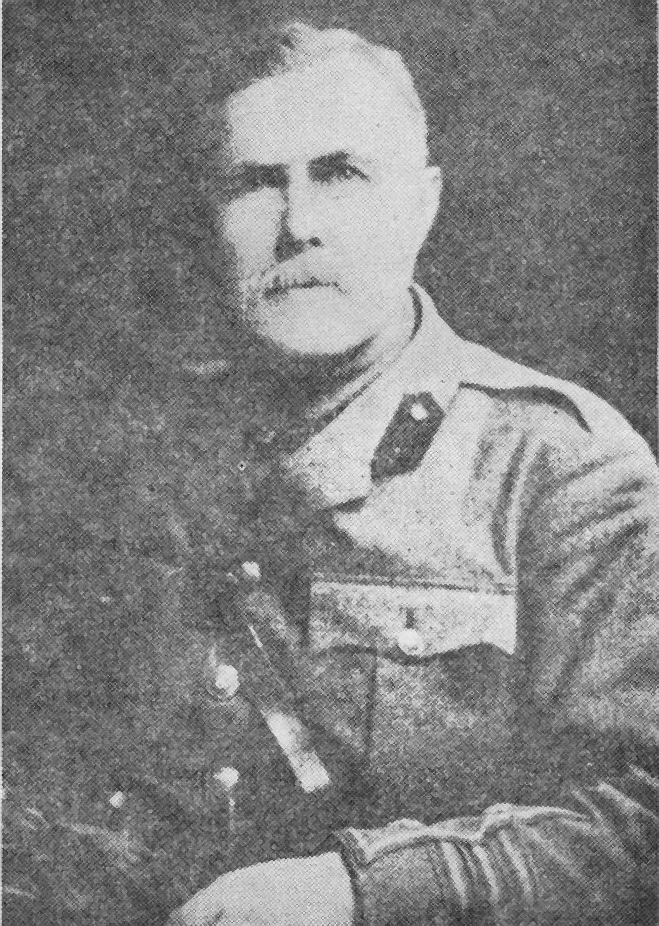
- Born: 21 July 1857
- Died: 9 December 1942 (aged 85)
- Citizenship: British

Signature
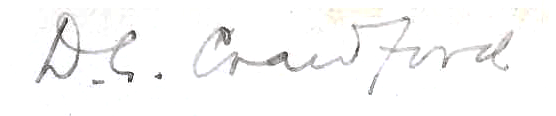

Dirom Grey Crawford (21 July 1857 – 9 December 1942) was an Indian-born British physician and officer of the Indian Medical Service (IMS). He rose to the rank of lieutenant colonel before retiring in 1911 and returning to serve on hospital ships during the First World War when he was mentioned in dispatches. He wrote a history of the IMS as well as the roll of its members which included biographical details of 6,156 of its officers.

== Early life and family ==
Dirom Crawford was born in Chinsura, in Bengal, India, on 21 July 1857 to James Alexander Crawford of the Bengal Civil Service and Christina Anne Crawford. He studied medicine at the University of Edinburgh, qualifying in 1881 and shortly afterwards joined the IMS.

He married Magdalene Leonora and they had children Violet, Charlotte, and William.

== Career ==
During his career in the Indian Medical Service he rose to the rank of lieutenant colonel before retiring in 1911. Following the outbreak of the First World War, he rejoined and served on hospital ships for more than four years during which time he was mentioned in dispatches.

Crawford wrote a number of articles for The Indian Medical Gazette but was most noted for his History of the Indian Medical Service 1600–1913 which was published in two volumes in 1914 and for his Roll of the Indian Medical Service 1615–1930 which was published in 711 pages in 1930 and gave biographies of 6,156 officers of the service. He included himself in the Roll in the same format as any other officer. The history began as a preface to a list of IMS officers but took on a life of its own.

The Roll first deals with the medical services in Bengal, Madras and Bombay, before going on to the general roll of IMS officers. It also details officers posted to such outlying places as Saint Helena, China, and Prince of Wales Island.

== Death and legacy ==
Crawford died on 9 December 1942. His address at the time of his death was 45 Mount Park Road, Ealing, Middlesex. He left an estate of £14,363 and probate was granted to Scott Crawford, electrical engineer, and Henry Lambert, former Indian Education Service officer.

== Selected publications ==
=== Articles ===
- "The services in 1898", The Indian Medical Gazette, Vol. XXXIV, No. 3 (March 1899).
- "The Medical Services in 1905", The Indian Medical Gazette, Vol. XLI, No. 3 (March 1906).
- "The Medical Services in the Mutiny". The Indian Medical Gazette, Vol. 43, No. 1 (January 1908), pp. 1–5.
- "The Legend of Gabriel Boughton", The Indian Medical Gazette, Vol. 44, No. 1 (January 1909), pp. 1–7.

=== Books ===
- A report on the sanitary condition of the Hooghly and Chinsurah Municipality. [1901]
- A Brief History of the Hughli District/Hughli Medical Gazetteer. Bengal Secretariat Press, Calcutta, [1902/03].
- A History of the Indian Medical Service, 1600–1913. W. Thacker & Co., London, 1914. Vol. 1., Vol. II.
- The Midnapore Zemindary Company. Waterlow, [1928].
- Roll of the Indian Medical Service 1615–1930. Thacker, Spink & Co., Calcutta, 1930. Pages i–298, Pages 299–710.
