= Oonah Keogh =

Irish stockbroker (1903–1989)

- Born: 2 May 1903; Dublin
- Died: 18 July 1989 (aged 86)
- Known for: First Irish woman stockbroker

Oonah Keogh (2 May 1903 – 18 July 1989) was an Irish woman who became the first female member of the Dublin Stock Exchange, in 1925. She may also have been the first woman stockbroker anywhere in the world accredited on a national exchange.

== Early life and education ==
Una Mary Irene Keogh was born in Dublin in 1903 to Joseph Chapman Keogh of Wicklow and Annie Kathleen Doyne of Mullingar, a middle daughter of eight children. Her father was known as the youngest bank manager in Irish history in the 1880s when he took on the job at age 24. Keogh attended the Catholic girl's schools St. Mary's Priory in Warwickshire and Alexandra College in Dublin, and also spent time studying at the Metropolitan School of Art. From 1922 through 1924 Keogh travelled around Africa and Europe with a governess. After she returned to London to study her father gave her a job in the family business, Joseph Keogh & Company Stockbroking.

== Career ==
A small number of women around the world had begun to work as stockbrokers in various capacities by the late 19th century. Sisters Victoria Woodhull and Tennessee Claflin were the first women to open a brokerage firm on Wall Street, in 1870, while Amy Bell was the first British woman to found her own firm in London, in 1886. However, the major national exchanges of Europe and North America mostly barred women from becoming members, and so these women tended to work outside of the system – either by offering consultancy services for female clients who were ignored by mainstream firms, by relying on accredited intermediaries to trade on exchanges on their behalf, or by specialising in financial products which were not traded via exchanges at all.

This systemic discrimination against women in the financial sector means that determining the true "first" woman stockbroker, either in the world or just a specific country, was difficult in the era before World War I. However, newspaper reports from the years immediately following the war indicate that women stockbrokers were increasingly common, with a small number accepted into exchanges in New York City, Berlin, and Amsterdam. In the UK, Doris Mortimer was the first woman to become a member of a British stock exchange when she joined Exeter's in 1923—while the London Stock Exchange would not admit its first female members until 1973.

Nevertheless, the Dublin Stock Exchange had never accepted a woman as a member before by the time Keogh returned to Ireland to work for her father's firm. The new Irish constitution guaranteed equality, and, with her education and wealth, Keogh was fully qualified. She was admitted to the exchange on 4 May 1925 after a three-week deliberation and voting process. She worked there for 14 years. Keogh experienced the typical difficulties of being the only woman in a male-dominated industry. In an interview in 1971, she said:

One of the disadvantages in those days was that women did not socialise with men in lounges of pubs. When the men retired to Jury’s to relax after transacting business I could not accompany them. And even when I went to the races with my father it was the same. He would go to the bar for a drink, I would have to slip off for afternoon tea.

Disagreements with her father encouraged her to take some time off and visit her sisters Eta and Genevieve in Hampshire in England. It was there she met her husband.

== Personal life ==
Keogh married Russian émigré Bayan Giltsof. When she married, Keogh resigned from her father's company but not from the Stock Exchange. She gave them notice of her new name and status. However, initially, she moved to Taunton, Somerset, England with her husband. There they began a building business and developed Tudor houses. She had a daughter Tatiana born in 1935 and two sons Rurik, in 1937 and Nicholi in 1939. Her fourth child Bayan was born in 1945. After her father's business went bankrupt, there was a court case involving one of his creditors. Keogh had lodged shares with a bank which was now claiming that they were owed against the company debts. Her father had not removed her name from the company documents and Keogh was found to owe the money, and thus also the court costs.

The family sold up the British home and moved back to Ireland. They bought land in Wicklow and created a set of houses known as The Russian Village. Irish President Cearbhall Ó Dálaigh retired there in 1976. In 1952 the family moved again to Ontario but they returned to England in 1953. Shortly after this, the couple separated. Giltsof returned to Wicklow until his death in 1977. Keogh moved with her daughter's family to Madrid. There she taught English in an international primary school. 1980 saw her return to Dublin with her daughter after her daughter's husband died. Both women died within eight days of each other in 1989, Keogh preceded by her daughter. They are buried in the family grave in Deansgrange Cemetery.
