= Paul Green-Armytage =

English cricketer and soldier

Paul Armytage
Personal information
- Full name: Paul Dayrell Green-Armytage
- Born: 28 March 1881; Clifton, Bristol, England
- Died: 1971 (aged 89–90); Stratford-upon-Avon, Warwickshire, England
- Batting: Unknown

Domestic team information
- Years: Team
- 1911/12–1913/14: Europeans

Career statistics
Competition	First-class
Matches	2
Runs scored	32
Batting average	8.00
100s/50s	–/–
Top score	19
Catches/stumpings	–/–
- Source: Cricinfo, 28 November 2023

Paul Dayrell Green-Armytage (28 March 1881 – 1971) was an English first-class cricketer and an officer in both the Royal Marines and the British Indian Army.

He was born in March 1881 at Clifton, the second son of Alfred Green-Armytage and the novelist and historian Amy Julia Green-Armytage. He was educated at Clifton College. Following the completion of his education, he joined the Royal Marines Light Infantry as a second lieutenant in September 1899, with promotion to lieutenant following in July 1900. In October 1905, he was appointed to the 117th Mahrattas of the British Indian Army, with promotion to captain following in March 1910; this promotion was later antedated to December 1909. Whilst in British India, Green-Armytage made two appearances in first-class cricket for the Europeans cricket team against the Parsees in the 1911–12 Bombay Presidency Match, and the Hindus in the 1913–14 Bombay Presidency Match. He scored 32 runs in his two matches, with a highest score of 19.

Green-Armytage served in the First World War, gaining the temporary rank of major in its second year. He gained the full rank in April 1917. Following the war, he was promoted to lieutenant colonel in May 1922, before retiring from active service in April 1928. Green-Armytage died at Stratford-upon-Avon in 1971. He was married to Gwendoline May Parks-Smith, the couple having married in July 1914. His younger brother was the gynaecologist Vivian Green-Armytage.
