= Amy Bell =

British stockbroker

Amy Elisabeth Bell
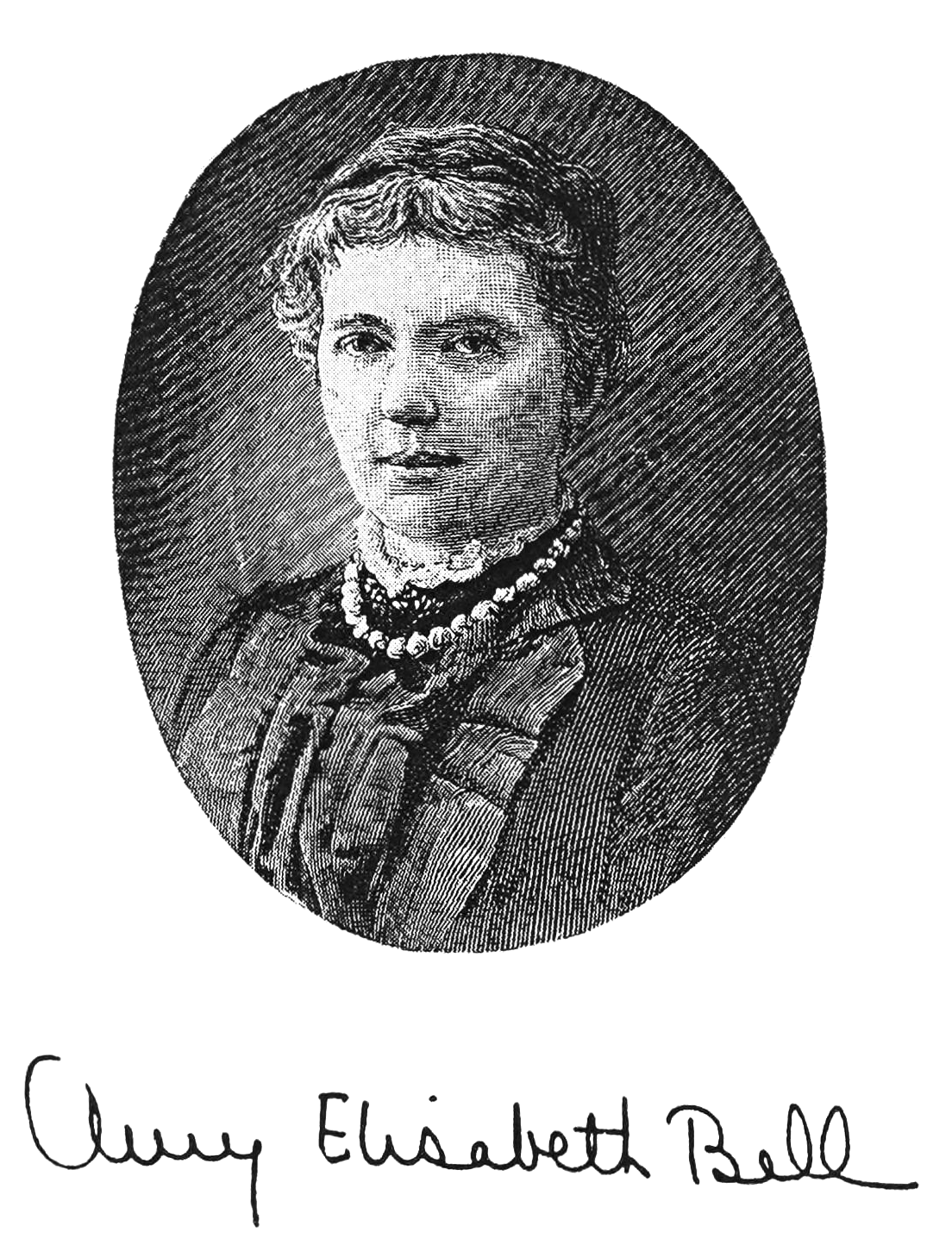
- Portrait and signature of Bell from 1895
- Born: February 13, 1859; Bangkok, Siam
- Died: March 11, 1920 (aged 61); London, United Kingdom
- Occupation: Stockbroker
- Relatives: Henry Goodeve (great-uncle)

Amy Elisabeth Bell (13 February 1859 – 11 March 1920) was a British stockbroker. She may have been the first woman stockbroker in the United Kingdom, founding her own brokerage firm in London in 1886.

== Early life ==
Bell was born in Bangkok, Siam (now Thailand) in February 1859, to Charlotte (née Goodeve) and Charles Bell. Charles Bell had been vice consul of the British trade mission in Siam since 1857, arriving with Charlotte in Bangkok two years after the British pressured the King of Siam to sign the Bowring Treaty, opening the country to foreign trade. Bell was orphaned when she was only six months old, with both Charles and Charlotte dying within a week of each other in September 1859 from unknown causes. Bell was left in the care of Charlotte's brother John Goodeve in England, a medical student at Queens' College, Cambridge. He in turn placed Bell in the care of his childless uncle, Henry Goodeve, and his wife Isabel (née Barlow). Goodeve had turned to philanthropy after retiring as a military doctor, and among his many roles in Bristol civil society he was president of the board of a home for orphaned children. While Bell is recorded as the Goodeve's "daughter" in the 1861 census, whether this reflected a formal adoption is unclear – Bell was listed instead as a "great-niece" in the 1871 census, and the census records also show that the Goodeves took in several other children from both the Barlow and Goodeve sides of the family.

She lived a comfortable childhood on their large, prestigious estate, Cook's Folly, overlooking Avon Gorge, near Bristol, which Dr Goodeve had designed himself. Her adoptive parents encouraged her intellectual development, including hiring a Swiss governess as a languages tutor. Bell had a fascination with finance from an early age, believing that her "highest recreation was to study the quotations of the money market." In later life she recalled an incident where an elderly gentleman expressed his annoyance with her interest in the stock pages of his copy of The Times by telling her, "Run away, little girl – I am busy with my lessons, and you must go to yours." She replied, "What's your lesson is my play."

When Bristol University admitted its first female students in 1876, Bell, at 17, was one of the first three women (alongside Marian Pease and Emily Pakeman) to earn a scholarship. She later won a Goldsmiths scholarship to study at Newnham College, Cambridge. However, due to recurring bouts of poor health (which would persist throughout her life, until her death), she was unable to complete her full studies at either Bristol or Newnham. The 1881 census records her as living back at home at Cook's Folly, aged 22, unmarried and unemployed.

== Career ==
When Henry Goodeve died in 1884, Bell was an executor of his estate. She used her inheritance as capital to establish her own stockbroking business in Bristol, but by 1886 had moved to London. That year's edition of The Englishwoman's Review noted that Bell, "whom we mentioned on a former occasion as intending to settle in London in the hitherto untried profession for a woman of stock and share broker, has an office at 1, Russell Chambers, Bury Street, Bloomsbury."

At the time, brokers in the UK were required to join their local stock exchanges as members—in London, this meant the London Stock Exchange (LSE). However, joining any stock exchange at the time required a majority vote of existing members – and, as their existing members were all men, those women who did attempt to make a profession out of stockbroking were routinely blocked from attaining the legitimacy of accreditation; many men thought of stock exchanges as a form of gentleman's club. Even as late at 1936, when the Board of Trade convened the Bodkin Inquiry to determine whether stockbroking required a new regulatory framework, only one woman stockbroker was called to give evidence—Gordon Holmes—and she had to argue against the sector's institutional sexism being formalised as part of the new regulations. The LSE would later admit its first women in 1973, while the first woman to successfully join a regional exchange (Exeter) was Doris Mortimer in 1923.

As she was working in an era without any realistic chance of obtaining membership of an exchange, Bell instead became what was known as an "outside broker". She established working relationships with male members of the LSE who could perform trades on her behalf, or dealt in commodities which were traded outside of the exchanges (like government bonds).

It is plausible that other British women by the late 19th century were also engaged in stockbroking activities like Bell, but, because they were denied official accreditation, records of their activities will necessarily be scarce. Women are known to have been professional stockbrokers in other countries before Bell, even without accreditation – such as sisters Victoria Woodhull and Tennessee Claflin, who founded a firm together in New York City in 1870. However, Bell's claim to be the "first" woman stockbroker in the UK is marked out by the fact that stockbroking was her main profession, not a hobby or part-time interest, including to the extent that she even founded and managed her own firm. She was also perceived as the "first" or "only" British woman stockbroker in a number of contemporary reports before the 1900s. When Doris Mortimer became the first woman to be admitted as a member of the Exeter Stock Exchange in 1923, Bell was cited by The Woman's Leader as the earliest known example of a woman working as a professional stockbroker in the UK: "In her steps a few other women have followed, but their exclusion from the ranks of recognized stockbrokers has prevented them from obtaining the remuneration that was their due."

Similarly, when Oonah Keogh became the first Irish woman stockbroker, joining the Dublin Stock Exchange in 1925, The Vote's front page story reported that women had already been admitted as members to the stock exchanges in Amsterdam, Berlin, and New York City, and that, "many years before the war, London had its pioneer woman stockbroker in the person of Miss Bell, and today, three women, Miss Mortimer, Miss Amy Hargreaves, of Nuneaton, and Miss Meynell, of London, are the only representatives of their sex in the world of stocks and shares." (This list cannot be taken as an exhaustive record of all women working as stockbrokers in the UK at the time – at the very least it misses out Gordon Holmes, who had founded her own firm as an outside broker in 1921.)

Bell's clients were mostly women, often with only small sums to invest – both factors that made them unappealing as clients to established firms. She never advertised, relying on word-of-mouth to source new clients, and her only employee was a female secretary. The Queen journalist and suffragist Margaret Bateson interviewed Bell around 1893, including the piece as one of a series of profiles for her book Professional Women Upon Their Professions: Conversations (1895). Bateson describes Bell as having been working as a stockbroker for "seven years ... and during the greater part of that time the only lady stockbroker in this country" – implying that Bell was no longer the only woman in her profession by that point. Bell explained her professional perspective to Bateson at length:

“I want,” she says, “to make women understand their money matters and take a pleasure in dealing with them. After all, is money such a sordid consideration? May it not make all the difference to a hard-working woman when she reaches middle life whether she has or has not those few hundreds? As a whole I find women are delightful clients, sensible, punctual, and courteous; but, of course, there are exceptions; some are at once both cautious and reckless. ... Many women are quite astonished when I explain business details to them, and ask 'But is that really all?' So many women, you see, are not allowed to have the command of their capital. But in this, as in other ways, I rejoice to see that women are daily becoming more independent.”

During the mid-1890s she also wrote at least two articles offering financial advice to women for the early feminist employment magazine Work and Leisure. By 1899 she was still working, with chambers at 5 Gray's Inn Square. However, her recurring poor health forced her into early retirement sometime around 1910, when she handed her firm over to another woman, G. I. Brooke. Brooke's husband was severely injured in the Battle of Colenso during the Boer War, leaving him housebound and dependent on his wife's income. Brooke was herself mistakenly reported to be the "only" woman stockbroker in the UK in 1912 by The Sketch (a claim which was corrected in a later edition).

== Personal life & legacy ==
Bell never married, nor had children. After her retirement she became part of London's women's suffrage social scene, and would often stay in the homes of activist friends in between periods of travel. Gordon Holmes – who was also described as the "first" or "only" woman stockbroker in the UK during her lifetime by both peers and the media – began her career in London around the same time that Bell retired, and both women were supporters of women's suffrage, with social circles that likely overlapped. However, Holmes makes no mention of Bell in her autobiography, professionally or politically, and it is unknown whether they ever met, or were even aware of each other's existence.

On the night of the 1911 census Bell was recorded as staying at the Ivanhoe Hotel in Bloomsbury with her "lady's companion", Emily Whitford, and with her occupation listed as "private means", indicating that she was likely financially comfortable in her retirement. When Bell died in March 1920 from heart failure, caused by influenza, she was staying at 3 Alexandra Road, Hampstead – the home of Elizabeth Ashurt Biggs' sister, Maude. Bell received a glowing obituary in the feminist newspaper The Woman's Leader:

"In her, workers for the women's cause have lost one of their pioneers. Her position was for many years unique, inasmuch as she was the first woman stockbroker, though, of course, as a penalty for her sex, the Stock Exchange excluded her from its membership. ... She opened an office on her own account in the city where, by her perfect straightforwardness, her genuine interest in the world's affairs, and her attractive personality, she won the sympathy of men of her own class and standing. ... She was also a woman of considerable literary taste, a great reader of poetry, and exceedingly fond of travel. Her mind, in short, was intensely alive."
