= Oliphant Chuckerbutty =

British organist and composer

Chuckerbutty, c. 1946

Soorjo Alexander William Langobard Oliphant Chuckerbutty (6 October 1884 – 5 September 1960), also known as Wilson Oliphant, was an English organist and composer, who was equally well known as a church organist and a cinema organist.

He was the grandson of the Indian medical professor Soorjo Coomar Goodeve Chuckerbutty (c.1826–1874).

== Life and career ==
Chuckerbutty was born in Paddington, London. He began playing the piano at six, and was composing by 14. He was taught piano technique by Julius Epstein. From 1908 to 1914 he was deputy to E. T. Cook as organist of Southwark Cathedral. In 1909 he graduated as Bachelor of Music at the University of London. In the same year he became organist and choirmaster of Holy Trinity, Paddington, a post that he held until 1948. He was made a Fellow of the Royal College of Organists.

In 1914 Chuckerbutty had his first song, "An Old Song", published by Boosey. Immediately after the First World War he started a dance band and ran it for several months, after which he began a career as a cinema organist, running in tandem with his church work. He joined the musical staff of the Angel, Islington in 1920, and played there until 1927, after which he held other similar posts at, among other venues, the Café Royal, Regent Street; Shoreditch Olympia; the Ritz, Edgware; the Carlton, Essex Road; the New Gallery and the Forum, Kentish Town. While at the Café Royal he made numerous records on the Aeolian Organ there.

In the early 1930s Chuckerbutty made Holy Trinity a well-known centre of music, with frequent performances of choral and orchestral music, both old and new. He and guest organists gave regular recitals on what The Musical Times described as "the fine Norman and Beard organ" there. The instrument featured an innovation designed by Chuckerbutty: the black notes on the pedals had the raised part both forward and backward, and so could be played with either heel or toe.

Chuckerbutty's final church appointment was at St Mary Oatlands, Weybridge, where he served for eight years, retiring due to ill health in 1956.

== Works ==
Chuckerbutty's works include "The Angelus" (piano), "Fauns and Satyrs" (orchestra), "Fiesta Argentina" (orchestra), "Pæan – A Song of Triumph" (organ), "Queen's Procession March" (organ), "A Southern Night" (piano), "Souvenir d'amour" (violin and piano), "Still in Dreams I See Her" (song), "The voice in the storm" (song) and "Vision (violin and orchestra).

== Writings ==
Chuckerbutty contributed several articles and letters to The Musical Times. Among his subjects were the orchestration of light classical music, the ignorance among music critics about good or bad organ playing, and – spread across three issues – a wide-ranging survey of the work of the cinema organist.

== References and sources ==
=== Sources ===
- Courtnay, Jack (1946). Theatre Organ World. London: Theatre Organ World Publications. OCLC 16122561.
