= Amar Prasad Ray =

Indian physician and malariologist

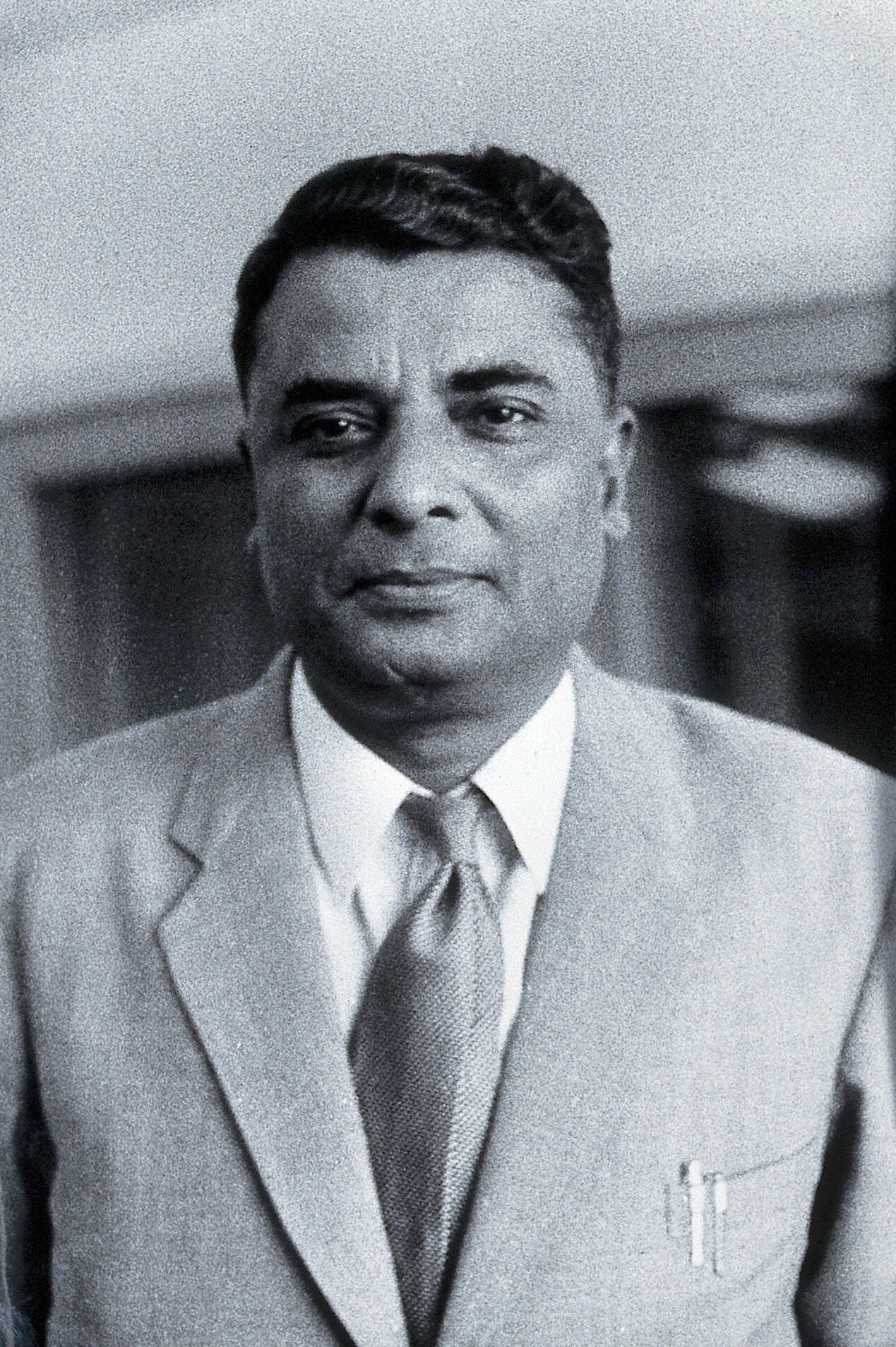
- A.P. Ray in 1960. Credit: Wellcome Library
- Born: 26 February 1913; India
- Died: 24 September 1996 (aged 83)
- Occupations: Malariologist, physician
- Awards: Padma Shri; WHO Governance Prize

Amar Prasad Ray was an Indian physician and malariologist. Born in 1913, he specialized in community health and the management of Malaria epidemic in India. He was an elected fellow (1962) of the Indian National Science Academy and a recipient of the 1974 Darling Foundation Prize from the World Health Organization Governance Award. He was honoured by the Government of India in 1967, with the award of Padma Shri, the fourth highest Indian civilian award for his contributions to the society. He was married to Kalyani Ray and had three children.
