= Harold Rothery Nutt =

Surgeon-General to the Bombay Government

- Born: 28 December 1876; Kensington, London, England
- Died: 2 January 1953 (aged 76); Eastbourne, East Sussex, England
- Military career
- Allegiance: United Kingdom
- Branch: British Indian Army
- Rank: Major-General
- Conflicts: World War I World War II
- Other work: Honorary Surgeon to the Viceroy of India; Honorary Surgeon to King George V

Major-General Harold Rothery Nutt FRCS (1876–1953) was Surgeon-General to the Bombay Government, Honorary Surgeon to the Viceroy of India and Honorary Surgeon to King George V.

== Early life ==
Nutt was born on 28 December 1876, the third of four sons of William Henry Rothery Nutt, an official of the Bank of England, and his wife Kathleen Laura (née Bloxham). He was educated at Bedford Modern School and St Mary's Hospital, London where he was 'house surgeon, assistant demonstrator of physiology, and clinical assistant and demonstrator in the skin department'.

== Career ==
Nutt was commissioned as a lieutenant in the Indian Medical Service on 27 June 1901, seeing active service on the North West Frontier. He was promoted to captain on 27 June 1904 and served as a civil surgeon in the United Provinces (1908–14) being promoted to the position of major on 27 December 1912.

During World War I he served in Egypt in 1915 and then in hospital ships. Nutt was promoted to lieutenant-colonel on 27 December 1921 and then served as professor of surgery at the University of Lucknow. From 1930 to 1933 Nutt was inspector-general of civil hospitals and was president of the United Provinces branch of the British Medical Association (1931–32). He was promoted major-general in 1933 and retired in 1935.

== Family life ==
In 1909 Nutt married Minnie, daughter of William McKerrow, who survived him with a daughter. He died in Eastbourne on 2 January 1953.
