= Djuka =

Djuka may refer to:

== African diaspora ==
- Djuka, archaic spelling of yuka, Afro-Cuban music genre
- Djuka, archaic spelling of the Ndyuka language of Suriname
- Djuka, archaic spelling of the Ndyuka people of Suriname

== Slavic people ==
Djuka (Đuka) can be a nickname for the given name Đurađ. It can also refer to:

- Đuka Agić (1906–1985), Croatian footballer
- Đuka Galović (1924–2015), Croatian musician
- Đuka Lovrić (1927–1957), Yugoslavian footballer
- Đuka Mandić (1822–1892), mother of inventor Nikola Tesla
- Đuka Begović, 1991 Croatian film
- Đuka, character in the 1975 Yugoslavian film Doktor Mladen
- "Đuka", song by Tatjana Đorđević and Strip
- Uroš Đurđević, nicknamed Đuka
- Vladimir Đukanović, nicknamed Đuka
