= Gordon Holmes (suffragette) =

British stockbroker and author (1884–1951)

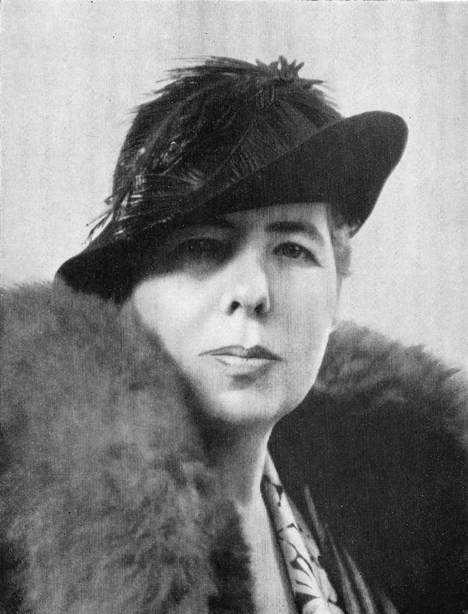
- Born: 30 September 1884; London
- Died: 21 November 1951 (aged 67); London
- Occupations: Stockbroker; Author; Trade Unionist

Gordon Holmes (30 September 1884 – 21 November 1951) was a British stockbroker, suffragette, trade unionist, and author. From the end of World War I until her retirement in the 1940s she was one of the most successful City financiers of her generation, well-known both for her entrepreneurial acumen and for her advocacy for women in business.

Though she was sometimes credited as the United Kingdom's "first woman stockbroker" during her lifetime, she was preceded by Amy Bell by at least 20 years.

== Early life ==
Beatrice Gordon Holmes was born on 30 September 1884 with her fraternal twin in London. She, her twin, two other brothers, and her parents lived in a small flat at 266 City Road. In her autobiography, she described her "modest outlook on life" as originating "partly due to poverty, and partly due to the impact and crushing effect of being the only girl among three brothers and a father all brought up in the masculine tradition... Those were the days, the 1880s and 90s, when men were not merely the masters of their own households, but the tyrants of their own households." They moved to a house in Kew when Holmes was nine months old – even briefly employing a household staff of a butler and maid – but were forced to return to their old flat on City Road three years later due to the family's constant financial difficulties. The family remained in the area through Holmes' childhood, as their father had an office on City Road; by the time of the 1901 census the family had moved a few doors down the road to No. 314.

While Homes' childhood was largely one of relative poverty, both sides of the family had histories of wealth. Her father, William Gordon Holmes, was a Dublin-born ear and throat specialist who began his career as a ship's doctor, and who worked for a time as an assistant to Morell Mackenzie. Holmes claimed that her father was descended from a noble Irish family which had been granted Ardee Castle by Oliver Cromwell in the 15th century, but "the entail was cut in my father's childhood, and with it went the last meagre remnant of property and unearned income."

Holmes' South African mother, Maria Thérèse Coqui, was born in Natal. Her Boer mother, Anna, was a member of the prominent van Breda family, while Maria's German-born father, Adolph Coqui, was a successful merchant and financier who had emigrated to Natal sometime around 1840; as well as his many colonial business interests (such as sitting on the board of the Natal Central Railway Company), he also served on the colony's Legislative Council in the 1850s. They moved to London around 1860, just before two of Adolph's companies—the Cotton Plantation Company of Natal and the Natal Investment Company—collapsed during the economic crash of 1866; Adolph personally lost £60,000 was left debilitated by a stroke on the same day. Anna spent the next "four or five" years traveling the world with her "invalid husband" until the family's cash savings of £5,000 were exhausted, whereupon she tried (and failed) to make a living running a boarding house out of the family's large home on Bedford Street in Bloomsbury, before she and her husband returned to South Africa again for good in the 1890s. Holmes claimed that the bulk of Adolph's surviving post-crash assets were lost when Anna (who possessed an "abysmal ignorance of business") burned his financial records during a stay in Ceylon, after becoming tired of carrying them around in a heavy iron lockbox.

William Gordon Holmes had an intense dislike of actual medical practice, and greatly preferred to focus on research – Holmes described him as a man with "academic brains, morose disposition, and violent temper," who "disliked almost everything and everyone, but he liked cats." He was an amateur carpenter of limited skill—he died after breaking his hip when a ladder he had built collapsed—and a miser, refusing to send Holmes to school until she was 11 because of the cost. She was a talented pupil, but most of her early education was delivered at home by her mother. However, her father was also an "inveterate" reader, and Holmes credited his subscription to Harper's Magazine – and his love for American fiction—for partly seeding her lifelong interest in both literature and the United States.

The circumstances of her upbringing left Holmes "shy, gauche, unsocial"; she described herself as, "a tomboy, vigorous and vital of lung and limb," although it took her until adulthood to find pride in her "powerful and characterful hands", "very large" and "unsightly mouth", and "impressive presence," which were the subjects of frequent criticism from her mother, siblings, and others. After leaving school in 1903, Holmes borrowed four guineas from her father so she could take a shorthand and typing course at a local college – she never paid him back. When she was 23 she also received lessons in mathematics and science for two years, "equivalent to a university education," from an uncle who was a "brilliant amateur scientist." Many years later Holmes discovered he was living in destitution in Vancouver, and she attempted to "pay back" by getting a London publisher to print his autobiography; despite a good review in the Times Literary Supplement, it was not successful.

At some point in her teens Holmes wrote a novel, From One Man's Hand To Another, which was eventually published in 1907 by T. Fisher Unwin as part of its "First Novel Library" series. Holmes used her grandmother's maiden name for her pen name, "G. H. Breda". Inspired by Olive Schreiner's 1883 feminist novel The Story Of An African Farm, the plot involves the "Bohemian occupants" of a London artist's studio. It received a mediocre review in the 4 May 1907 issue of The Aethenaeum: the "original" setting and "strange" cast of characters were "by no means deficient in charm" - and there was evidence that "the writer should do better work hereafter" – but nevertheless the characters often have "extraordinary misunderstandings with regards to matter of fact," and the heroine's "transcendent mental endowments and power of fascination for the opposite sex we are compelled, in the absence of confirmatory evidence, to take mainly on trust." Holmes never published any other fiction, though she would write occasional newspaper columns about her professional experiences in later life.

== Career ==
=== Finance ===
In 1903, 19-year-old Holmes landed her first job, as a business secretary – though she was fired within two weeks for being "incompetent". She quickly found a new job earning £1 per week as a typist in the newly opened London offices of Odense Aegforretning, a Danish firm exporting eggs to the UK. Her boss was Mr Ravens, "a quiet Danish gentleman – hard as steel under his exterior," whom Holmes called her, "first and lifelong business friend." Over the following eight years she developed a number of new business skills, but Ravens never paid her more than £2 per week. In 1911, she used her savings to pay for a second-class cabin for herself and her mother on the RMS Baltic, for a month-long holiday to the US – the first of many trips to the country she would make throughout her life. She began seeking a new job with higher pay on her return, but found it difficult to be taken seriously as a woman seeking a well-remunerated professional career.

Holmes eventually joined Irish-Canadian stockbroker William Thorold's merchant bank – Canadian and General Trust, Ltd – on Lombard Street as a secretary, being paid a starting salary of £2 5s. As she had no experience of finance, Thorold gave her a copy of Stocks & Shares by Hartley Withers to read over the weekend before her first day – later writing, "and with that book I began my financial career." Holmes and Thorold had a volatile working relationship; while she admired Thorold's "erratic brilliance" as a broker – "about the most brilliant mind I ever met" – and intellectually thrived under his exacting mentorship, he was also considered "the most difficult man in the City to work for ... a cold-blooded, completely selfish egocentric streaked with sentimentality," with "a temper he never attempted to control." His firm had a notoriously high staff turnover rate; Holmes claimed, "The first 5 1/2 [years] were among the most stimulating of my business life, and the other 3 years were plain unmitigated hell." During her first few months at the firm Holmes overhauled its record-keeping system, and quickly established herself as Thorold's indispensable right-hand woman; however, he still told Holmes that "women are incapable of understanding financial matters," and that "your only limitations are the limitations of the female mind" – statements which Holmes took great pleasure in repeating to journalists in later years, aware that it reflected badly on (the then-retired) Thorold.

When the First World War began in 1914, Thorold returned to Canada and almost all the male employees – from the directors downwards – enlisted, leaving Holmes behind as the most senior member of staff. The business thrived under her stewardship, brokering "hundred of thousands of pounds" of war bonds, and by 1918 the men who returned from the front found their salaries were higher than when they left. Holmes later referred to this period as, "the romantic years, the golden years, in which everything was new and fascinating – and terrifying." She found little trouble working as a woman in the City in this period, although she was "only too well aware of how unusual it all was"; since she avoided her birth name, Beatrice, and preferred to be known as "Gordon Holmes" professionally and socially, men often expressed shock on first meeting her or hearing her voice over the phone.

Holmes kept Thorold informed of her activities throughout the war, and the firm's success – without his direct influence – caused him to become even more emotionally erratic; when he returned to London in 1917 he berated Holmes for what he perceived as poor decision-making, but at the same time also acquiesced to her request to more than double her pay from "under £4 per week" to £500 per year. Their working relationship never regained stability after the war. In 1918, Holmes collapsed at work while suffering from both appendicitis "and the enormous pressure of working with Thorold's personality, standing between him and his staff ... who had worked with me with very great loyalty while I had been in sole charge." During the argument that resulted, Holmes quit, to deny Thorold the satisfaction of firing her, however, her persistent anxieties about struggling to find a new job and falling back into poverty meant that she returned to work for him, "bitterly," after only a few months. By 1919 Holmes was earning £1,000 per year, but was still deeply unhappy.

Holmes had maintained a friendship with her former employer Mr Ravens, and he suggested that Holmes found her own firm with Thorold's company secretary, Richard Sefton Turner, who had also become a personal friend. When she protested that she would need at least £10,000 in starting capital, Ravens offered £5,000 from his own retirement savings, and introduced them to other financiers in the City who provided the rest. They resigned simultaneously in 1921, and opened their new firm, National Securities Corporation, Ltd, in a small two-room office on West Street with two typists as staff. Before they left, Holmes and Turner had offered to buy Thorold out for £5,000, arguing that his firm's value was mostly down to their influence; he refused. His firm never recovered, however, and in 1928 he was forced to sell to them for only £1,000 and retire to North America. The new venture was a success – by 1929 Holmes and Turner had a staff of 140, and they were mostly untroubled by the crash that led to the Great Depression. By 1930 Holmes was reportedly earning as much as £5,000 per year (roughly equivalent to £330,000 in 2020), making her one of the wealthiest self-made women of the era. Turner and Holmes considered opening a New York City branch around 1925, but decided to focus on European interests instead in large part because "Wall Street ran on a very different and much tougher, rougher moral code than London – in fact, it seemed to us no moral code at all."

Women were not allowed to become members of the London Stock Exchange (LSE) until 1973, and most of the UK's regional stock exchanges similarly barred women until well into the 20th century. However, at least as far back as Amy Bell in 1886, some female stockbrokers had evaded this issue by relying upon male exchange members as intermediaries for trades, often informally. Alternatively, many stockbrokers worked in what were known as "outside houses" – bona fide trading firms which specialized in products (like government and municipal bonds) which were unregulated by the LSE. In 1936, in the wake the Great Depression, the Board of Trade convened an inquiry chaired by Archibald Bodkin to investigate regulatory oversight of the brokering of shares and stocks, including the activities of outside houses; Holmes and Turner's firm was the largest in the City at the time, and Holmes was the only woman called to give evidence in front of the committee. She specifically appeared to "represent the women's interests" as much as in her capacity as a stockbroker, and urged the committee not to recommend that all outside houses be forced to join stock exchanges which only allowed men as members:

At the appropriate moment when we were before the committee I interposed: “If it is the intention to recommend that all finance houses should join a Stock Exchange, I have been asked to request that this Committee stipulate that all Stock Exchanges shall admit women. Otherwise you put me out of business, and other women like me, because at the present time the London Stock Exchange does not admit women, and a recent survey shows that no other Stock Exchange in this Country admits women either.” The Vice-Chairman of the London Stock Exchange rose to his feet and said: “The London Stock Exchange is a private Club. If women want that sort of club, let them form one of their own.” But the courteous Chairman, Sir Archibald Bodkin, replied to me: “Your point is well made, and we will see that it is given due consideration in our recommendations.”

The Bodkin Committee's recommendations were subsequently brought into law by Parliament through the Prevention of Fraud (Investments) Act of 1939, including the regulation of outside houses via a new professional member organisation – instead of a stock exchange. The Association of Stock and Share Dealers (ASSD) was founded in 1938 in anticipation of the reforms, with Turner as its chairman and Holmes also on the board. Holmes later claimed that "by the accident of my presence from the start on the formation body, [the ASSD] was the first financial organization in the country officially to open the doors of finance to women on exactly the same terms as men." By the mid-1930s, Holmes was one of the most well-known and recognizable people in London finance:

[Holmes] was a woman of commanding stature, tall, erect, and stately. More of a personage than a person, her dynamism was immediately obvious. Her height and very presence made her a conspicuous figure wherever she went and one could almost say that people made way before her ... In the City of London she was a well-known figure, habitually dressed in a cream tailored suit, cream stockings and shoes, with gaily coloured hat and blouse, the latter adorned with a long string of matching beads. As she walked through the city streets, she was spoken of by all and sundry as "that remarkable woman in the white suit".

Holmes also had the distinction of becoming the first woman to sit on the board of a Hungarian bank, after several of the directors of Budapest's City Savings Bank had visited London in order to secure permission to deal in securities on the LSE in 1927 and sought out British directors as part of the process. Some of the bank's directors were Jewish, which Holmes admits in her autobiography she was ignorant of until it was pointed out to her – and that she also missed the wider political context of "the writing on the wall, anti-Semitism" until nearly the outbreak of World War II. Her firm was involved in a number of state investments in countries across Europe, including Germany, in the build-up to the war, which she made no apologies for; she argued that the deals she facilitated were a morally necessary part of the process of rebuilding the continent after the previous war, and that the rise of Hitler and outbreak of another conflict was "foreseen as impossible to most of us ... And we were not criminals for thinking so and acting so. We were not even fools. We were just human beings, making no claims to be crystal-gazers."

During the late-1930s, as war approached and Jews were increasingly barred from public and professional life in countries within the Nazi sphere of influence (including Hungary), Holmes and Turner insisted that "if the Jewish staff had to be dismissed in accordance with those horrible lawless laws it should be only at the fifty-ninth minute of the eleventh hour," and "every possible compensation in pensions, bonuses, and salaries should be devised and given them." They were particularly worried about the bank's managing director, and offered him and his wife £1,000 to flee to London or New York City; he refused, believing that the sudden departure of someone with his profile would inspire panic, causing a bank run that would bring down the Hungarian financial system. Holmes found the "comparative indifference" of the Christian directors towards the situation striking, while the other Jewish board members were "heartbroken", and similarly unwilling to leave out of a sense of national duty; their eventual fates during the war are unknown.

=== Activism & political beliefs ===
In 1904, Holmes became a founding committee member of the Association of Shorthand Writers and Typists (ASWT), a union for clerical workers which would eventually merge into APEX in 1940 (and which in turn merged into GMB in 1989). "It is always hard to get human beings to organize," Holmes later wrote, "and harder still when the human beings are young women from 'nice homes' who regard organization as synonymous with trade-unionism, then hardly respectable." Among their first members was the playwright Elizabeth Baker, whose play Chains depicted contemporary working class clerical life.

Holmes became a suffragette around the same time she joined the ASWT, and sold copies of The Suffragette on the streets of Westminster. She believed that the women's suffrage movement, "helped to make the women of my generation. It gave us pride of sex, helped to stop the everlasting apology within us for being women, taught us to value ourselves and our abilities, and taught us to fight for those valuations in terms of pay and responsibility, public and private." She was a great admirer of Emmeline Pankhurst in particular, and anonymously gifted the suffragette leader a recurring "small sum" of money every six months from 1924 until Pankhurst's death in 1928.

In 1923, she was invited to become a founding member of the Greater London branch of the Federation of Soroptimists – an international organisation intended to be a female counterpart to the men-only Rotary Club movement. In her autobiography, she wrote that she was "very interested and impressed to note how many women directors of business houses there were. Names I had known and had taken for granted were men’s names, were now revealed to be women’s. I noticed with admiration that many of these women had large staffs and handled their staffs admirably. If I had ever had a tendency after my successful years in the City to regard myself as something unique, joining the Soroptimists stopped it."

After joining the Soroptimists Holmes found herself dealing with "publicity" for the first time in her life, something which she had previously "shunned like the plague". A journalist reported on the first speech Holmes gave to a Soroptimist meeting in 1924, leading to her briefly becoming an object of media fascination as photographers and journalists doorstepped her at home and at work. Her comments on controversial women's rights issues of the day were often reported across the UK from the mid-1920s onwards – such as approving of typists wearing short sleeves in offices, defending the education system from the charge that it was failing to teach girls essential workplace skills, refuting the belief that suffragism had suppressed wages in many sectors by increasing the supply of labour, and arguing for more women in Parliament. In 1925 she appeared on the early national radio station 2LO to speak about her life as a stockbroker, and she occasionally wrote columns about her professional experiences and insights which were syndicated in many of the UK's regional newspapers. She was well-known enough that some of her more bullish statements - such as "The modern flapper from fifteen to twenty-five does not know what an inferiority complex is", "Why should not a girl do as well as Lord Leverhulme?", or "There is no champagne like success" - would appear in newspapers which reported notable quotes. She eventually learned to enjoy media attention instead of finding it embarrassing, especially during a business trip through South and North America in 1925 which left her "feeling like the Prince of Wales." In her later years, she would give speeches to audiences of younger women in business about how it had given her "a swollen head – but that is not always a bad thing for a business or professional woman."

Holmes had been an avid traveller since her first voyage to the US in 1911, and began to feature Soroptimist work – including networking with other businesswomen – on her trips. Her reputation landed her the nicknames "The General" and "Miss John D. Rockefeller" among her Wall Street peers; she also bore a striking resemblance to Eleanor Roosevelt (who was born only a few days after Holmes in 1884), and was often mistaken for the First Lady. The idealised view of the US that she had developed as a child tempered somewhat as she grew older, especially due to her perception of its business culture as overly aggressive, though she still loved the country and occasionally considered emigrating there. From the late-1920s until the early years of World War II, Holmes went on multiple foreign trips per year, preferring women chauffeurs wherever possible to drive her around. She visited much of the Americas, Middle East, Europe, and even (in 1935) the Soviet Union. She had little interest in the specifics of political or economic ideologies, and preferred pragmatism over dogma:

I don’t believe that capitalism is in itself right or wrong. Like other systems of economics, medicine, education, or what not, capitalism may be the best available system at a given moment, or the worst. Other newer methods may be tried, found better, and the older methods scrapped – or the new methods may not be found all that was hoped, and the older systems are returned to while continued experimentation goes on for better ways. There is not necessarily any fundamental Q.E.D. in systems, theories, methods. There is no finality, economic or otherwise, in human affairs, or, if there is, we are too ignorant in our present state of development to know it.

She was repeatedly critical of high British tax rates from the 1930s onwards, claiming that "the fastest method of converting to socialism, faster than all the preachers and lecturers could do, is to give half of the money you earn to the government." However, while she was skeptical of the New Deal as a policy response to the Great Depression, she nevertheless endorsed temporarily higher rates of income tax in the UK in order to fund "an orgy of public and private spending" that would make it the "best-housed, best-fed, best-clothed, best-educated, best-travelled, and best-amused country in the world" after World War II ended. She believed that the welfare system should be generous enough so that the unemployed had "enough to live on, not merely exist on," and that it was "better to waste money power than work power," especially where it could prevent poverty-related health issues.

Holmes had drifted away from the women's suffrage movement around 1912 after becoming more interested in her new career in finance, while the Soroptimists – whose "rotarian membership" was limited to only the wealthiest women of the time – did not represent a "solid cross-section" of society. However, in July 1936 her interest in feminist activism was rekindled after being invited to speak in Paris at a conference of the International Federation of Business and Professional Women, an organisation which advocated for the rights of working women of all classes. Established in Geneva in 1930, it traced its origins to the Business and Professional Women's Foundation (BPW), established in the US in 1919 by a number of American women's rights activists led by Kentucky lawyer Lena Madesin Phillips – who was also the International Federation's president. Holmes, surrounded by a "magnificent regiment of women" from across Europe, the Americas, and Australia at the July 1936 event, described feeling like "Rip Van Winkle" – "To me as an old Suffragette it was thrilling, [and] gave me a feeling of unexpectedly finding an astonishing sequel to a story in which my generation had played a part."

Holmes extended her stay in Paris by two weeks in order to advise the International Federation on its financial matters, and was subsequently invited to sit on its board as finance chairman; she also developed a close working relationship with Phillips, whom Holmes considered to be "one of the great American leaders." Holmes attended the International Federation's July 1937 conference in Atlantic City, and visited Hyde Park to meet with Eleanor Roosevelt. When Holmes returned to London in 1936 she began organising to establish a national British branch of the International Federation, using her personal and business relationships to build support and attract donations. Lawyer and BPW activist Zonola Longstreth (who at the time was the youngest person ever to pass the Arkansas bar, aged 19) traveled to the UK in 1938 and spent several weeks overseeing the creation of three London clubs for women in business. Longstreth's trip culminated in a meeting on 12 November 1938 of around 40 prominent British businesswomen at the Washington Hotel in London, where the National Federation of Business and Professional Women’s Clubs of Great Britain and Northern Ireland (now known as Business & Professional Women UK) was officially formed; hundreds of regional affiliate clubs followed over the next few years. Holmes was elected its founding president, serving in that role until 1947. In her first speech to its members, she said:

Our faith is that business and professional women have something new to contribute. The trained woman as a class is just 30 years old. She comes as an outsider ... She represents a new source of power, an unexplored field of thought. She brings what the world has been waiting for, an entirely new perspective on old problems.

During the summer of 1938, Holmes travelled with Phillips to Budapest for the final pre-WWII conference of the International Federation (though a smaller event would still take place in 1939 in Trondheim). On the way home they stopped in Vienna, where they met with the leader of the Austrian affiliate, Marianne Beth, a "non-Aryan" who had been barred from her work as a psychologist by the Nazi regime after Anschluss – the Federation would eventually assist her and her family in escaping to the US and Canada. Holmes was also fond of Czechoslovak senator and feminist Františka Plamínková – "Plam" – who sat on the International Federation's board as a vice-president, but Holmes and other members were unable to convince her not to return to Prague after the outbreak of war; Holmes was deeply upset at her execution by the Nazis in 1942. Holmes continued to travel to the US throughout WWII, although much less frequently; she was particularly moved by a dinner held in Los Angeles in July 1941 for refugee members that the Federation has assisted in escaping to the US.

In the post-war years Holmes was known as "G.H." to younger members of BPW UK, who were fond of her positive attitude. Dorothy V. Hall's 1964 history of BPW UK, Making Things Happen, takes its title from Holmes reportedly being fond of saying that, "all things will happen in time, but we can make them happen sooner." Holmes remained in work until the late-1940s, retiring due to long-term health issues. She had suffered a severe bout of phlebitis in 1931 which nearly killed her, and over the following years her mobility decreased such that by the time she was writing her autobiography in 1944 she struggled to walk further than half a mile at a time.

== Personal life and legacy ==
Holmes went by "Gordon Holmes" throughout her life – including as the authorial name for her autobiography, In Love With Life: A Pioneer Career Woman's Story, published in 1944. She never married, nor had children.

Richard Hillebrand Morgan—son of prominent Ceylonese lawyer and judge Sir Richard Francis Morgan—was her uncle by marriage.

Her autobiography was dedicated to her long-time friend and companion Helen Boyle, the pioneering psychologist and mental health campaigner. Holmes met Boyle in 1918 while recovering from appendicitis in Brighton; she would later write that, "I felt she was the most remarkable person I had ever met in my life, and that I adored her ... And there began in 1918 a close friendship that has lasted ever since, has had no ups or downs, and has been, above all other things in my fortunate life, the fortunate thing I have been most profoundly grateful for." Holmes used her financial expertise to assist Boyle in raising funds to establish The Lady Chichester Hospital in 1920, the first British hospital dedicated to the treatment of nervous disorders, and sat on its board as honorary financial adviser. She maintained an interest in medical provision for the rest of her life – especially mental healthcare provision for women – and sat on a number of other health boards.

Holmes' other closest friendship was with theatrical producer Lilian Baylis. They first met when Holmes was 12 – Baylis had just moved to London from South Africa, after having been romantically involved with Holmes' maternal uncle, Jack Coqui, in Johannesburg. They became friends after meeting again as adults several years later, with Baylis (or "Lil") introducing Holmes to the worlds of theatre, opera, and ballet. Baylis reportedly used to quip that, "you know, dear, if I had married your Uncle Jack, you would be my niece!"

She was also friends with the journalist Raymond Gram Swing, and met with him every time she visited New York City during the 1930s. She claimed that he believed he had accidentally failed to stop the outbreak of World War I in the summer of 1914 after he was asked by the German government to convey a peace offer to the British, but failed to accurately represent its terms.

Holmes was 55 when her mother Maria died, and for almost all of that time they lived together. Holmes wrote that Maria was "entirely dependent" on her – "emotionally as well as financially" – and was intensely jealous of anyone whom Holmes expressed affection towards. Holmes wrote: "To daughters in my position, however, or likely to drift into that position through fear of hurting a much-loved parent, I would say, 'Don't allow any person to use you as an outlet for their worst qualities of possessiveness, jealousy, selfishness, even under the true guise of fond love. Somehow break away before such emotional domination becomes so rooted – in both – that part of you feels crippled, and part of her is a monstrous growth.'" It was only once she had established herself professionally in her early-30s that she felt that she was able to develop her own independent tastes and personality, including taking an interest in fashion for the first time. However, she never fully shed the shyness she developed as a child, and remained uncomfortable in leadership positions.

While Holmes never practised any formal religion – and "detested Church" – she nevertheless claimed to have, "an intense respect, deference, reverence, for the deeply spiritual personality." She professed an admiration for "the austere God of the Old Testament," and agreed with H. G. Wells' interpretation of him in The Outline of History as a "Righteous Dealer, whose promises were kept, who failed not the humblest creditor, and called to account every spurious act."

Her favourite painting was Chemin de la Machine, Louveciennes by Alfred Sisley. Her favourite novel as a child was Olive Schreiner's The Story of an African Farm, while her favourite authors as an adult were George Gissing and Anthony Trollope. In 1948, she paid for and donated a bronze sculpture of a smiling baby by Dora Gordine to the maternity wing of Holloway Prison, after being told that "there was nothing beautiful" there. Though it was eventually moved into a storage room and forgotten, Happy Baby was rediscovered in 2009 and is now considered an important work in Gordine's oeuvre.

When she died at her home in Chiswick on 21 November 1951, she left behind an estate worth £26,880 – the equivalent of more than £850,000 in 2020. Her obituary in The Times declared that, with her death, "the City loses a prominent figure and the women's movement an inspiring leader."
