= Soorjo Coomar Goodeve Chuckerbutty =

Indian doctor

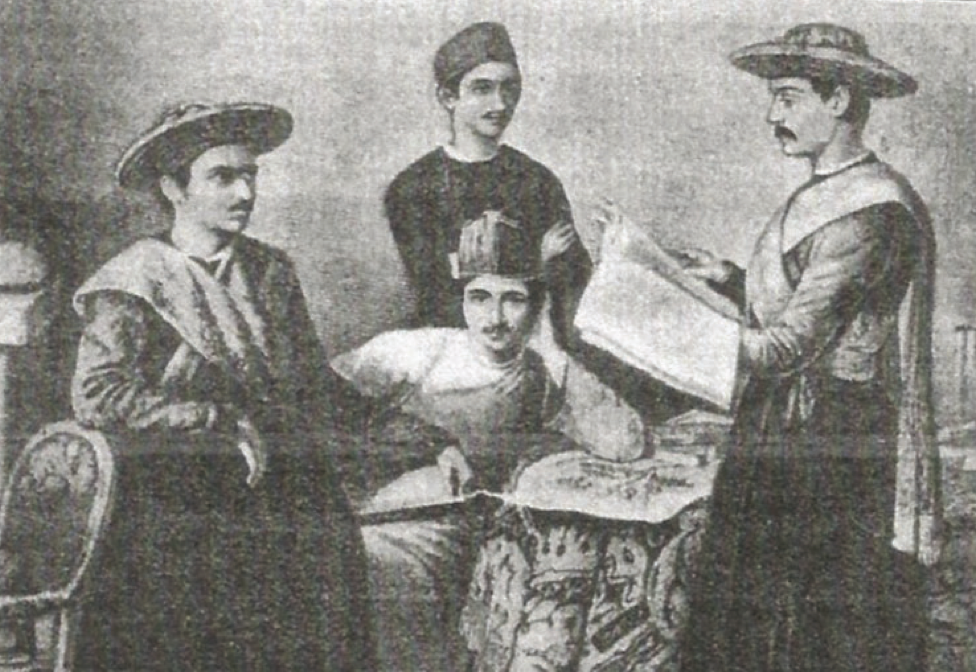
- Chuckerbutty (first on right)
- Born: Surjo Kumar Chakraborty; 28 February 1826; Bikrampur ,Dacca, Bengal, British India
- Died: 29 September 1874 (aged 48); Kensington, England, United Kingdom
- Education: Hare School; Medical College, Bengal; University College London
- Occupation: Professor of Materia Medica
- Medical career
- Notable works: Popular Lectures on Subjects of Indian Interest (1870)

Soorjo Coomar Goodeve Chuckerbutty, also spelled Surjo Kumar Chakraborty MRCS (28 February 1826 – 29 September 1874) was the first Indian to pass the examination of the Indian Medical Service (IMS) in 1855 and subsequently became the Professor of Materia Medica at Calcutta Medical College (CMC) in the latter half of the nineteenth century.

Orphaned at the age of six, his aspirations for an English education led him to the Hare School and then entry into medicine at the Medical College of Bengal, where, under the guidance of retired professor of anatomy and obstetrics Henry Goodeve and funding from the government, he was one of the first four Brahmin medical students taken to England in 1845 for further medical training. Upon return to India in 1850, despite his achievements being celebrated and supported by some of his British colleagues, he was prohibited from taking up a senior post in the IMS. When the announcement to open the IMS examination to 'all' came in 1854, Chuckerbutty took the opportunity to take it and passed in second place.

Returning again to India, he became the first Indian professor of Medicine at Calcutta Medical College. In addition, he co-founded the Bethune Society and became the president of the Bengal Branch of the British Medical Association. As one of the earliest Indians to contribute to western medicine, he published in medical journals including The Lancet, the British Medical Journal and The Indian Medical Gazette. Initially embracing the British ways of life, his later lectures, "Popular Lectures on Subjects of Indian Interest", following the Indian Rebellion of 1857, reflected his changed opinion and criticism of European interest. He died in Kensington during a visit to London in 1874.

== Early life ==
Soorjo Coomar Goodeve Chuckerbutty was born a Brahmin, as Soorjo Coomar Chuckerbutty, in either 1824, 1826 or 1827 in Kanaksar village of Louhajanj area situated on the bank of Padma river (Ganges river) of Bikrampur (present day Munshiganj district) of Dhaka district ,British India, to pleader, Radhamadhab Chuckerbutty. He was orphaned at the age of six. Subsequently he completed his early education in Bengali, Sanskrit and Persian at his home village school (Pathshala) situated in his village kanaksar. Then, at the age of 13, he became influenced by an official visit and his first experience of hearing English. As a consequence, he travelled the sixty mile journey to Comilla district where he was taken under a district court official, Golok Nath Sen, and attended the English school where in order to pay his way, he exchanged working as a cook for English lessons. He gained admission to the Hare School in Kolkata (then Calcutta).

== Early medical career ==
Challenging Hindu prejudices against touching dead bodies had been instigated in the previous decade when CMC’s first anatomy professor, Henry Goodeve demonstrated anatomy to his first cohort of Hindu students in the 1830s. It was most likely as a result of his influence that Chuckerbuttty himself added "Goodeve" to his own name, inserting it before his surname, and his [Henry Goodeve's] recommendation that he gained entry into the then new Medical College of Bengal (CMC), at his second attempt in 1844. The College had been established in 1835 by M. J. Bramley, who was an advocate of travelling fellowships for bright students, and at the request of Goodeve, who had been proposing the extension of medical training to certain Hindus and who had offered to bear costs for one student, plans materialised for one such trip.

In 1845, the government sponsored Chuckerbutty's travel to England for further medical education. Together with Bholanath Bose from Barrackpore and Gopal Chunder Seal, who were sponsored by a regional entrepreneur, Dwarkanath Tagore and another student, Dwarka Nath Basu, the four travelled by ship with Goodeve. Chuckerbutty was the youngest of them.

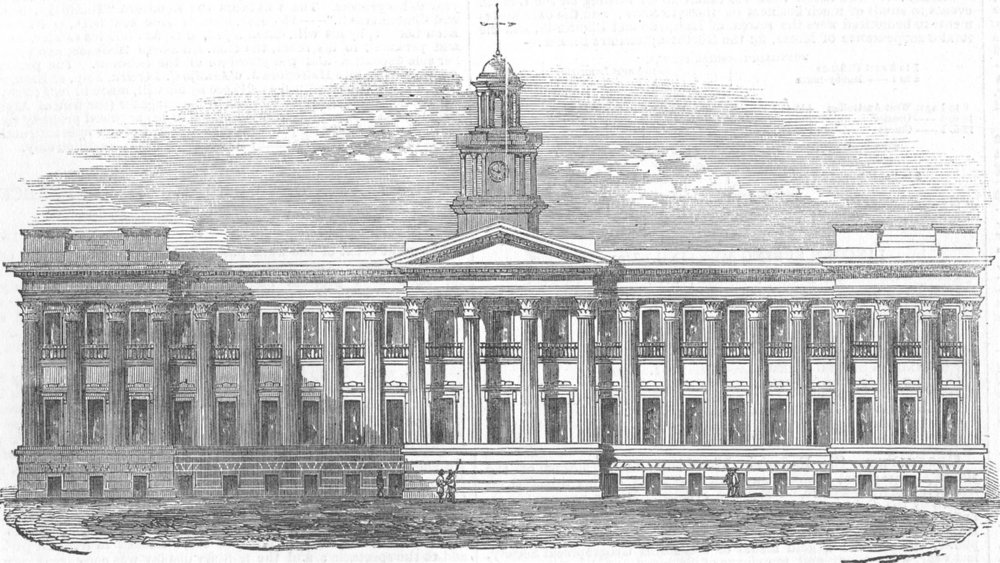
"The New Medical College Hospital, Calcutta," Illustrated London News, 1853

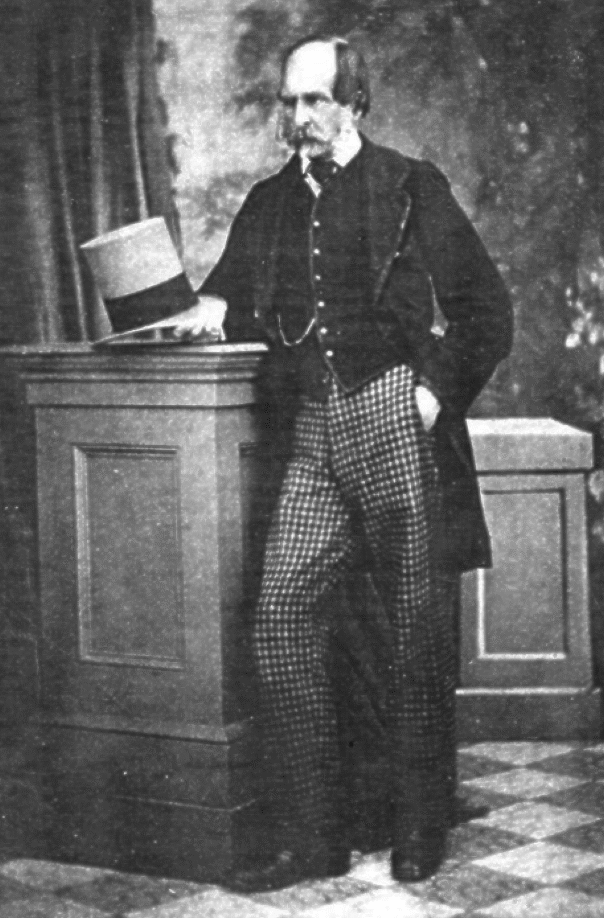
Henry Goodeve

== Life in England ==
Scientific American 1848, Goodeve-Chuckerbutty receives Diploma from London College of Surgeons

Chuckerbutty was Goodeve's favourite student. and much of Chuckerbutty's account of life in England comes from memoirs of Professor Goodeve, who described how he embraced and was charmed by the British ways of life and of Christianity, views that years later Chuckerbutty had changed opinion of.

Having travelled to London with Goodeve, the four students also resided with him at 7 Upper Woburn Place. Chuckerbutty passed the first M.B. examination in the first division in 1847. He became a member of the Royal College of Surgeons (RCS) in 1848. At one point during his training, he was awarded the gold medal for comparative anatomy, before completing his M.D. in 1849, in the first division and achieving the second place in order of merit. Minimum age requirements for the examinations meant that he attained his qualifications two years after the other students. On Chuckerbutty's behalf, Goodeve had successfully requested for further funding and an extension to stay.

In 1848, he reported to the Medical College in Calcutta, his spontaneous conversion to Christianity and his adoption of his new name Soorjo Coomar "Goodeve" Chuckerbutty.

Chuckerbutty had a particular close tie with the professor of comparative anatomy, Robert Edmond Grant, who previously taught Charles Darwin. Professor Grant also mentored Chuckerbutty and allowed him to be involved in three of his natural history expeditions around Europe. By the end of these trips, he had taught himself French and German, and some of his notes from these voyages were later published. He would have perhaps taken a fourth journey, had the French Revolution of 1848 not interrupted its plans. Once, Chuckerbutty took one of Professor Grant's lectures, teaching comparative anatomy to a class of more than five hundred.

== Indian Medical Service ==
Before 1855, Indians were not permitted to take senior appointments in the IMS. The recommendation by barrister and advocate of educating higher caste Hindus Sir Edward Ryan, after whom Chuckerbutty later named his elder son, proposed that Chuckerbutty should be appointed to the covenanted medical service and a professorship at the CMC on his return to India in 1850. However, this was denied by authorities and he therefore, took up a post as an assistant physician to the uncovenanted service at the Calcutta Medical Hospital (CMH) in 1850.

In 1854, under the uncovenanted medical service, he was appointed the Professor of Materia Medica and Clinical Medicine and Second Physician to the Hospital. Opportunities for Indians to take up higher posts was one mission of Sir Edwards, and in 1854, the East India Company opened up the covenanted Medical Service examination to all. As a consequence, Chuckerbutty decided to travel back to London to sit it. He was one of the twenty-two candidates out of twenty-eight, and the first Indian to pass this exam of the IMS in January 1855, coming second after George Marr. Subsequently, he was appointed to the covenanted medical service as Assistant Surgeon in January 1855. In 1867 he became Surgeon and in 1873, Surgeon Major to the Bengal Army.

However, public and official statements did not always reflect official sentiment and what really happened in practice. The years leading up to his professorship witnessed social and unofficial prejudices, resulting in a series of fleeting positions as Professor of Materia Medica, a permanent position only being granted in 1866 after Norman Chevers had retired. Chuckerbutty was the first Indian to have this position. Preconceptions also arose from Indians. The social stigma from dissecting a corpse and travelling abroad counted him an outcast for much of the Indian community.

== Medical contributions ==
He published notes on a case of epilepsy in the Medical Times and Gazette, London, in 1852, whilst he was assistant physician at the CMH.

His writings in the 1850s show he was also a Nationalist and he campaigned to structure and extend education among Indians, particularly to introduce gymnasiums and sports including cricket and fencing to the Indian youth. He lobbied for education in languages and traditional studies, and proposed improved sanitation in Calcutta. His articles on dysentery and cholera were published in the Indian Annals.

In his lecture dated 8 July 1858, more than a year before Charles Darwin's release of On the Origin of Species, Chukerbutty commented; "When God made some men dark and other men fair, he had a great purpose to serve. He did not make climates for men, but men for climates". Both, had been mentored and influenced by the same teacher (Professor Grant), raising the question of whether Chuckerbutty had spoken about evolution first.

19th century British medicine in India had its concerns with India’s many febrile illnesses and epidemics and some leading physicians disputed the existence of typhus in India. Chuckerbutty, however, was one who believed otherwise and reported on cases of typhus in Calcutta that he had treated in 1864.

In addition to leading roles in a number of Calcutta's hospitals and dispensaries, he published in the Medical Times and Gazette, the Lancet, the British Medical Journal, the Indian Medical Gazette and the Indian Annals of Medical Science of Calcutta. He also edited the fourth edition of Goodeve's Hints on Children in India.

== Other roles ==
In 1863, he was appointed Fellow of the Calcutta University and he became a Justice of the Peace for the town of Calcutta in the same year. With the coloured elite and a group of liberal white men, he co-founded the Bethune Society in 1851, and also co-founded the Bengal Branch of the British Medical Association, becoming its president for one year.

In 1870, he published a collection of his lectures from the previous two decades, "Popular Lectures on Subjects of Indian Interest", following the Indian Rebellion of 1857 and which reflected his changed opinion and criticism of European interest. In the same publication, he advocated educating Indians and he also disclosed that at least two ex-students of CMC had joined the sepoys in the Indian Rebellion.

== Family ==
Chuckerbutty married Sarah and had four sons and two daughters.

Sarah died in 1878. Of the six children that are known, Henry Scott Ryan became a Barrister, practised at the Calcutta High Court and in 1902, co-authored a book on becoming a Barrister. William Maurice attended the University of London to study science and was the father of the famous pianist Oliphant Chuckerbutty. Alfred joined the Indian Civil Service in 1889 and Marie Ann studied at the University of Cambridge. Another daughter to be educated in England was Martha.

== Death and legacy ==
Chuckerbutty suffered from multiple asthma attacks and suspected heart failure, and therefore took a leave from work in 1874. However, he died the same year in Kensington, aged 48, and was buried in Kensal Green Cemetery in West London.

At the CMC, he was succeeded by R. C. Chandra.

== Selected publications ==
- Chuckerbutty, SG (1862). "Medical College Hospital, Calcutta". British Medical Journal. 2 (81): 61–4. doi:10.1136/bmj.2.81.61. PMC 2288187. PMID 20744107..
- Chuckerbutty, SG (1862). "Medical College Hospital, Calcutta". British Medical Journal. 2 (82): 85–6. doi:10.1136/bmj.2.82.85. PMC 2288093. PMID 20744110.
- "Cases illustrative of the Pathology of Dysentery", Military Orphan Press, Calcutta, 1865.
- "Cholera, its symptoms, clinical history, pathology, diagnosis, prognosis, treatment and prophylaxis", R. C. Lepage and Co, Calcutta, 1867.
- Chuckerbutty, SG (1867). "On the Pathology of Hepatic Abscess as a Result of Dysentery". Indian Medical Gazette. 2 (9): 222–223. PMC 5162330. PMID 28996176.
- Chuckerbutty, SG (1867). "Local Correspondence". Indian Medical Gazette. 2 (11): 276. PMC 5162188. PMID 28996052.
- Popular Lectures on Subjects of Indian Interest, Thomas S. Smith, Calcutta, 1870.
- Chuckerbutty, SC (1872). "A Case of Lacerated and Contused Wound of the Scrotum". Indian Medical Gazette. 7 (11): 249. PMC 5132653. PMID 28995162.
