= Thomas Shepherd Novis =

British surgeon (1874–1962)

Thomas Shepherd Novis FRCS
- Born: 3 December 1874; Brighton, England
- Died: 2 March 1962 (aged 87); Cape Town, South Africa
- Education: Bedford Modern School
- Alma mater: London Hospital

Thomas Shepherd Novis FRCS (3 December 1874 – 2 March 1962), was a British surgeon with the Indian Medical Service.

== Life ==
Novis was born on 3 December 1874. He was educated at Bedford Modern School and trained at the London Hospital where he qualified as MRCS and LRCP in 1897. He joined the Indian Medical Service in 1898 as a Lieutenant, and was promoted to Captain in 1901, Major in 1910 and Lieutenant-Colonel in 1918. He was elected a Fellow of the Royal College of Surgeons in 1910 and became Professor of Surgery and Senior Surgeon at the Grant Medical College and Sir Jamshedjee Jeejeebhoy Group of Hospitals, Bombay.

Thomas Novis retired from the Indian Medical Service in 1927. He died in Cape Town on 2 March 1962 and was survived by his wife, Beatrice Mildred Novis (née Mott).
