= Edward Alfred Birch =

Irish surgeon

Edward Alfred Birch (24 September 1840 – 27 November 1912) was an Irish surgeon and member of the Indian Medical Service.

Birch was superintendent of the Presidency European General Hospital in Calcutta, and from 1890 to 1892 principal of the Calcutta Medical College.
