= Eden Hospital =

Hospital

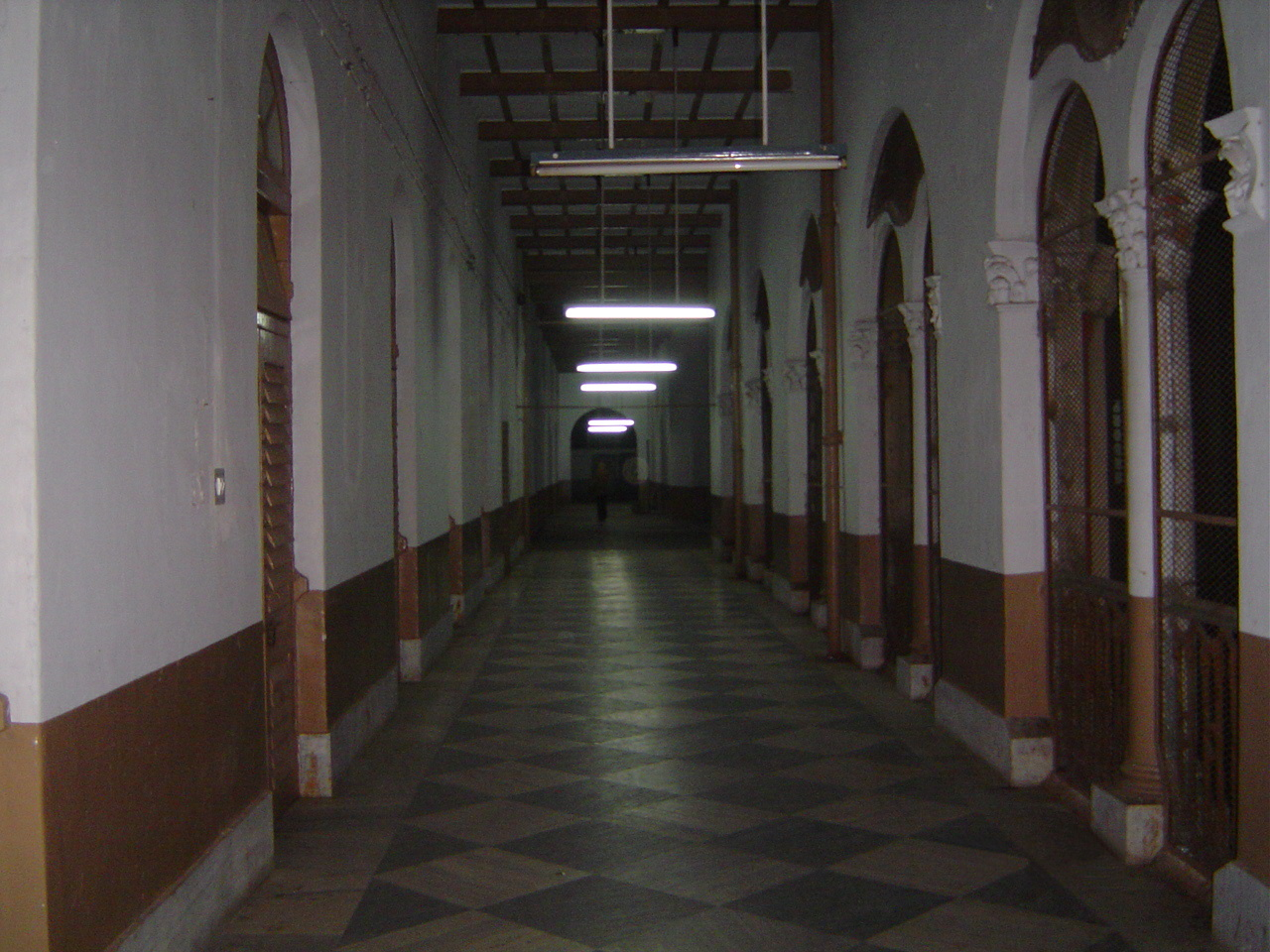

Geography
- Location: Kolkata, West Bengal, India

History
- Opened: 1881

Eden Hospital, established in 1881, houses the Department of Gynaecology and Obstetrics in Medical College Kolkata, India.

== History ==
The gynaecological & midwifery care at Medical College received a great boost with the establishment of the Eden Hospital in 1881. The admission of patients started from 17 July 1882 with accommodation for 41 Europeans and 42 Indians. This was the largest obstetrics & gynaecological ward in the whole of Asia. The Eden Hospital extension was completed in 1931 to accommodate a further 38 patients. In 1933, the trustees of the Estate of the late Mary Helena Mauger of Darjeeling donated Rs. 3,07,00 for Eden Hospital. Two hostels for junior doctors, namely Bonophool Hostel & Eden Roof Hostels, were built above the 3rd floor of the Eden Hospital in the 1970s.
