= Margaret Moore White =

English gynaecologist

Margaret Moore White FRCS FRCOG (5 February 1902 - 17 January 1983) was an English gynaecologist who, with Miss Gertrude Dearnley, began one of the first infertility clinics in Britain at the Royal Free Hospital in 1937.

== Selected publications ==
- The Symptomatic Diagnosis and Treatment of Gynaecological Disorders. H. K. Lewis & Co. Ltd., 1944.
- Womanhood. Cassell, London, 1947.
- "Uteroplasty in Infertility", Proceedings of the Royal Society of Medicine, Vol. 53, Issue 12, pp. 1006–1009.
- The Management of Impaired Fertility. Oxford University Press, London, 1962. (With Vivian Bartley Green-Armytage)
