= Theodore Duka =

Hungarian-born soldier and physician

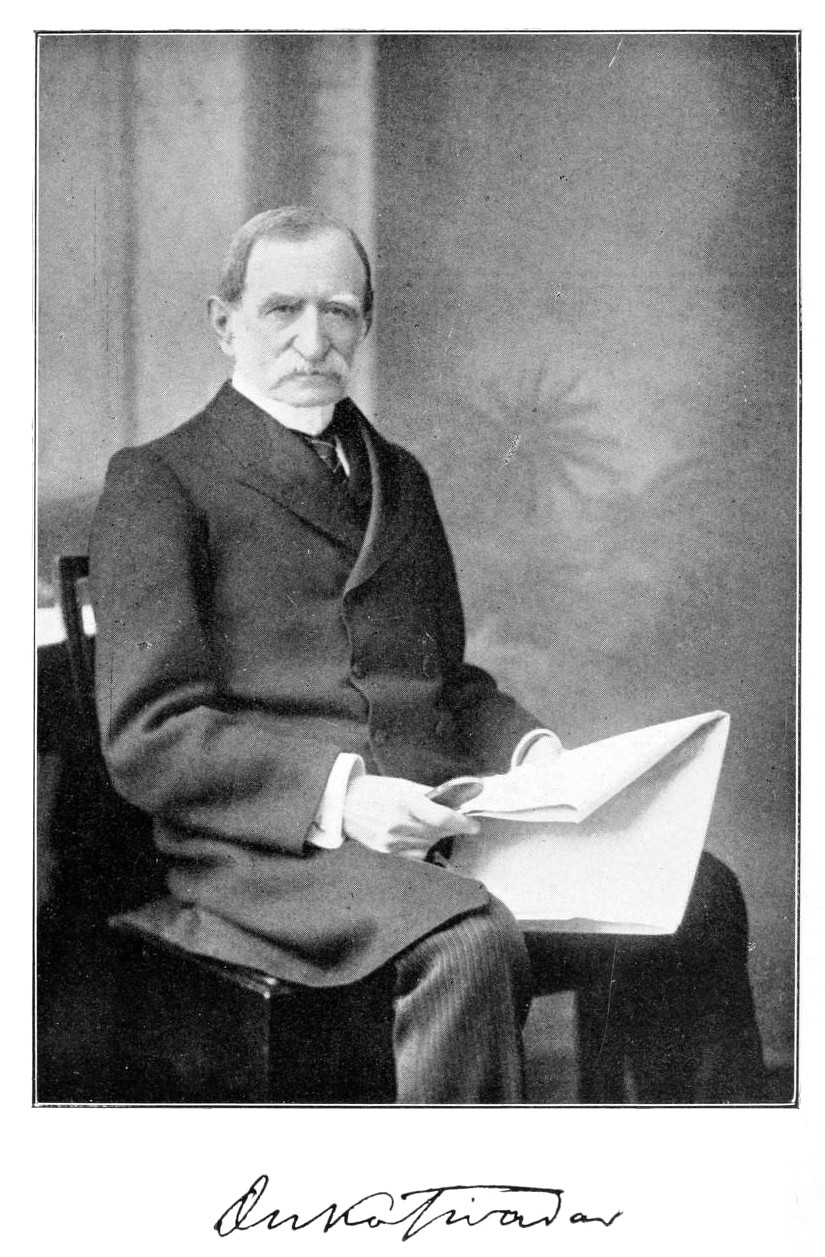

Theodore Duka or Duka Tivadar (22 June 1825 – 5 May 1908) was a Hungarian army officer, who later became a medical doctor in the United Kingdom and worked in India on various topics, especially philology.

== Life ==
Duka was born at Dukafalva, Sáros County, to Francis de Duka and Johanna, daughter of Francis de Szechy. He studied at the Lutheran College at Eperjes and later studied law at the University of Budapest. In 1848 he served in the government working under Louis Kossuth, the Finance Minister. During the war, he joined the National Army and became an aide-de-camp to General Arthur Görgey, commander of the 7th Army Corps in the Hungarian National Army and saw action at Világos in 1849 and at the First Battle of Komárom on 26 April 1849. Duka and the other Hungarians surrendered to the Russians but were released. He made his way through Germany and France where he was helped by István Türr. In 1850 he reached London and he began to study medicine at St George's Hospital. His ability to speak several European languages helped and he taught German and studied English at the Birkbeck Institution. Through the influence of George Pollock, Duka received a commission as Assistant Surgeon in the Bengal Army and served in Monghyr, Patna, Shimla and Darjeeling. Here he studied many Indian languages. He also collected specimens of natural history, including nearly 500 bird skins and eggs which he sent to the Hungarian National Museum. He married the daughter of Reverend Charles Taylor at Calcutta on 14 January 1855 and he retired from the Indian Medical Service on 27 March 1877 with the rank of lieutenant colonel.

Duka settled in England and devoted time to researching languages and was a Member of Council of the Royal Asiatic Society and served as president of the Tropical Section of the Eighth International Congress of Hygiene and Demography in 1894. The Society published, among other things, a scholarly article by Duka about the languages of Central Asia. His knowledge of languages was put to use by the British and Foreign Bible Society where he served as vice president for many years. One of his books was on the life of his fellow countrymen, Sándor Kőrösi Csoma, a pioneer of Tibetan studies in India. Csoma had nearly walked his way to India in his quest to determine if an idea prevalent in his time that the Magyar language was derived from a central Asian language possibly those spoken by the Uyghurs. Another major work of Duka was his Essay on Brahui grammar (1885). He took an interest in the Brahui language because it was insular and extremely different from the languages around where it was spoken and in some ways resembling the insular situation of the Magyar language.

Duka died in Bournemouth, England on 5 May 1908 and was survived by his wife and two sons.
