= Charles Green =

Charles Green may refer to:

== Arts and entertainment ==
- Charles Green (painter) (1840–1898), English painter and illustrator
- Chuck Green (1919–1997), American tap dancer
- Angry Grandpa or Charles Marvin Green Jr. (1950–2017), American YouTube personality
- CG5 (musician) or Charles Duncan Green V (born 1999), American musician and YouTuber

== Military ==
- Sir Charles Green, 1st Baronet (1749–1831), British Army general
- Charles D. B. Green (1897–1941), World War I flying ace
- Charles Green (Australian soldier) (1919–1950)
- Charles Patrick Green (1914–1999), World War II flying ace
- Charles B. Green (born 1955), surgeon general of the United States Air Force

== Sports ==
- Charles Green (cricketer) (1846–1916), English cricketer
- Charlie Phil Rosenberg or Charles Green (1902–1976), American boxer, world champion bantamweight
- Charles Patrick Green (1914–1999), British Olympic bobsledder
- Charles Green (athlete) (1921–2009), Australian Olympian
- Charley Green (1942–2014), American professional boxer
- Joe Green (baseball, born 1878) (Charles Albert Green, 1878–1962), American baseball player
- Chaz Green (born 1992), American football player

== Other ==
- Charles Green (archaeologist) (1901–1972), English archaeologist
- Charles Green (astronomer) (1734–1771), British astronomer, travelled with James Cook
- Charles Green (balloonist) (1785–1870), England's most famous balloonist of the 19th century
- Charles Green (bishop) (1864–1944), archbishop of Wales
- Charles Green (businessman) (born 1953), British businessman with Rangers F.C. and Sheffield United F.C.
- Charles Green (cook) (1888–1974), British ship's cook on Shackleton's Endurance expedition
- Charles B. Green (Mississippi politician), lawyer and state legislator in Mississippi.
- C. C. Green (Charles C. Green), Republican politician in the U. S. State of Arizona
- Charles C. Green (Ohio politician) (1873–1940), Republican politician in the U. S. State of Ohio
- Charles Dymoke Green Sr. (1873–1954), British Scouting leader
- Charles Dymoke Green Jr. (1907–1988), British Scouting leader
- Charles Robert Mortimer Green (1863–1950), surgeon in the Indian Medical Service
- Charles Samuel Green, state legislator in South Carolina
- Charles W. Green (1849–1926), first teacher of agriculture at Tuskegee Institute

== See also ==
- Charlie Green (disambiguation)
- Charles Greene (disambiguation)
- Charlie Greene (disambiguation)
- Charles Fiddian-Green (1898–1976), English cricketer
- Charles Leedham-Green, Scottish group theorist
