= Charlie Green =

Charlie Green may refer to:

- Charlie Green (trombonist) (1893–1935), American jazz trombonist
- Charlie Green, a pseudonym used by Sammy Davis Jr. (1925–1990) on early recordings for Capitol Records
- Charlie Green (golfer) (1932–2013), Scottish amateur golfer
- Charlie Green (American football) (born 1943), American football player
- Charlie Green (singer) (born 1997), English child singer
  - Charlie Green (album), Charlie Green's debut album
- Charlie Green, main protagonist in the novel Good Girl, Bad Blood, sequel to A Good Girl's Guide to Murder

== See also ==
- Charles Green (disambiguation)
- Charley Green (1942–2014), American boxer and convicted murderer
- Charles Greene (disambiguation)
- Charlie Greene (disambiguation)
