= Charles Dymoke Green =

Charles Dymoke Green refers to two British Scouting personalities, father and son:

- Charles Dymoke Green Sr.
- Charles Dymoke Green Jr.
