= Shoshone sculpin =

Conservation status
- Near Threatened (IUCN 3.1)

Scientific classification
- Kingdom: Animalia
- Phylum: Chordata
- Class: Actinopterygii
- Order: Perciformes
- Suborder: Cottoidei
- Family: Cottidae
- Genus: Cottus
- Species: C. greenei

Binomial name
- Cottus greenei (C. H. Gilbert & Culver, 1898)

Synonyms
- Uranidea greenei Gilbert & Culver, 1898

Species of fish

The Shoshone sculpin (Cottus greenei) is a species of freshwater ray-finned fish belonging to the family Cottidae, the typical sculpins. It is It is endemic to the United States. It inhabits spring systems in the Thousand Springs formation near Hagerman, south-central Idaho. It reaches a maximum length of 9.0 cm. The specific name honors Charles Wilson Greene who was an instructor in physiology at Stanford University and was on the expedition on which the type was collected from the Thousand Springs on the Snake River, near mouth of Salmon Falls River in Gooding County, Idaho.
