= Charles Greene =

Charles Greene may refer to:

- Charles Ezra Greene (1842–1903), American civil engineer
- Charles Gordon Greene (1804–1886), American journalist
- Charles Greene (sprinter) (1945–2022), American athlete
- Charles Sumner Greene (1868–1957), American architect
- Charles Warren Greene (1840–1920), American journalist and author
- Charles Wilson Greene (1866–1947), American professor of physiology and pharmacology

== See also ==
- Charles Green (disambiguation)
- Charlie Greene (disambiguation)
