= Snake River =

Major river in the northwestern United States

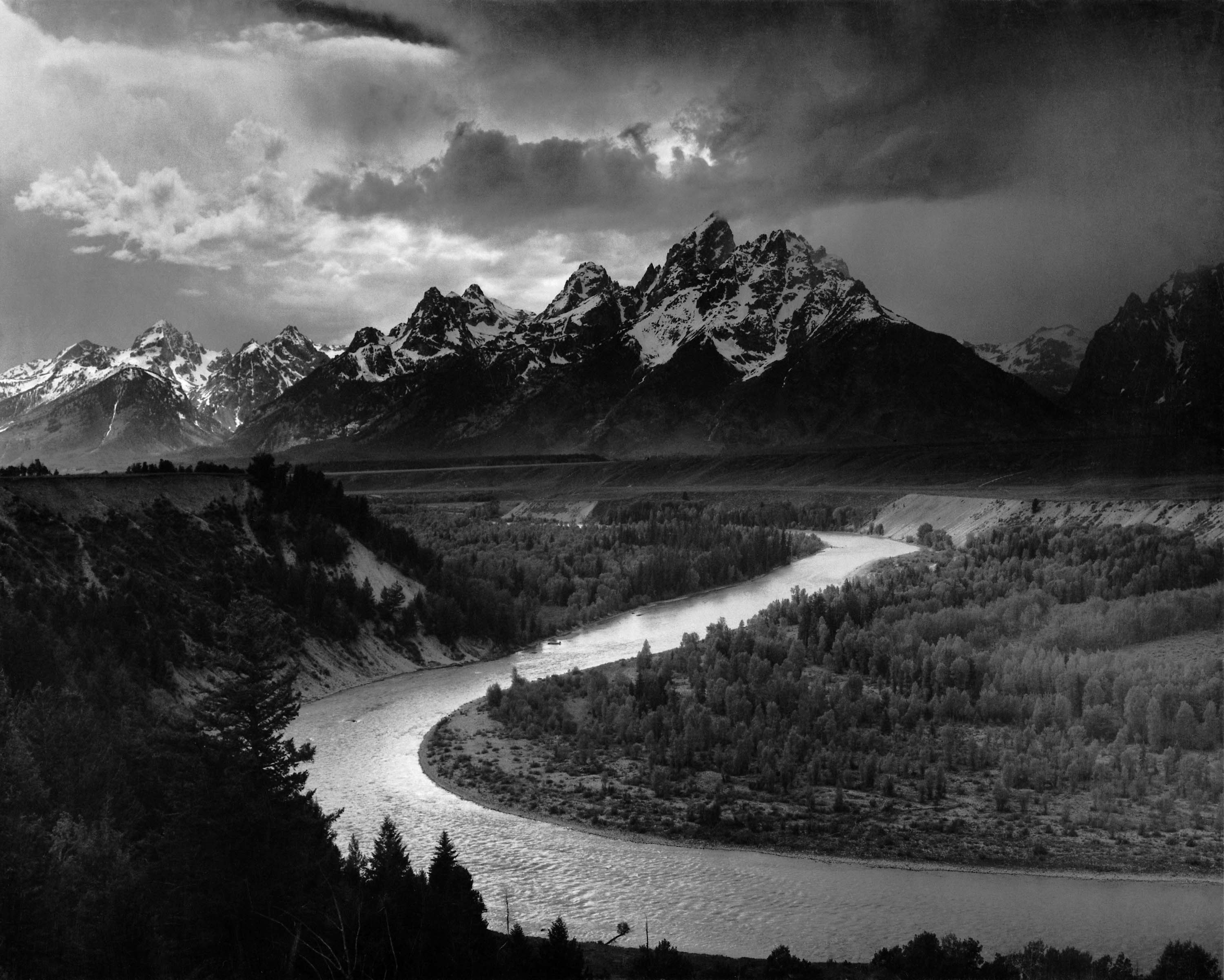
- The Tetons and the Snake River (photographed by Ansel Adams, 1942) shows the Snake River and the Teton Range.

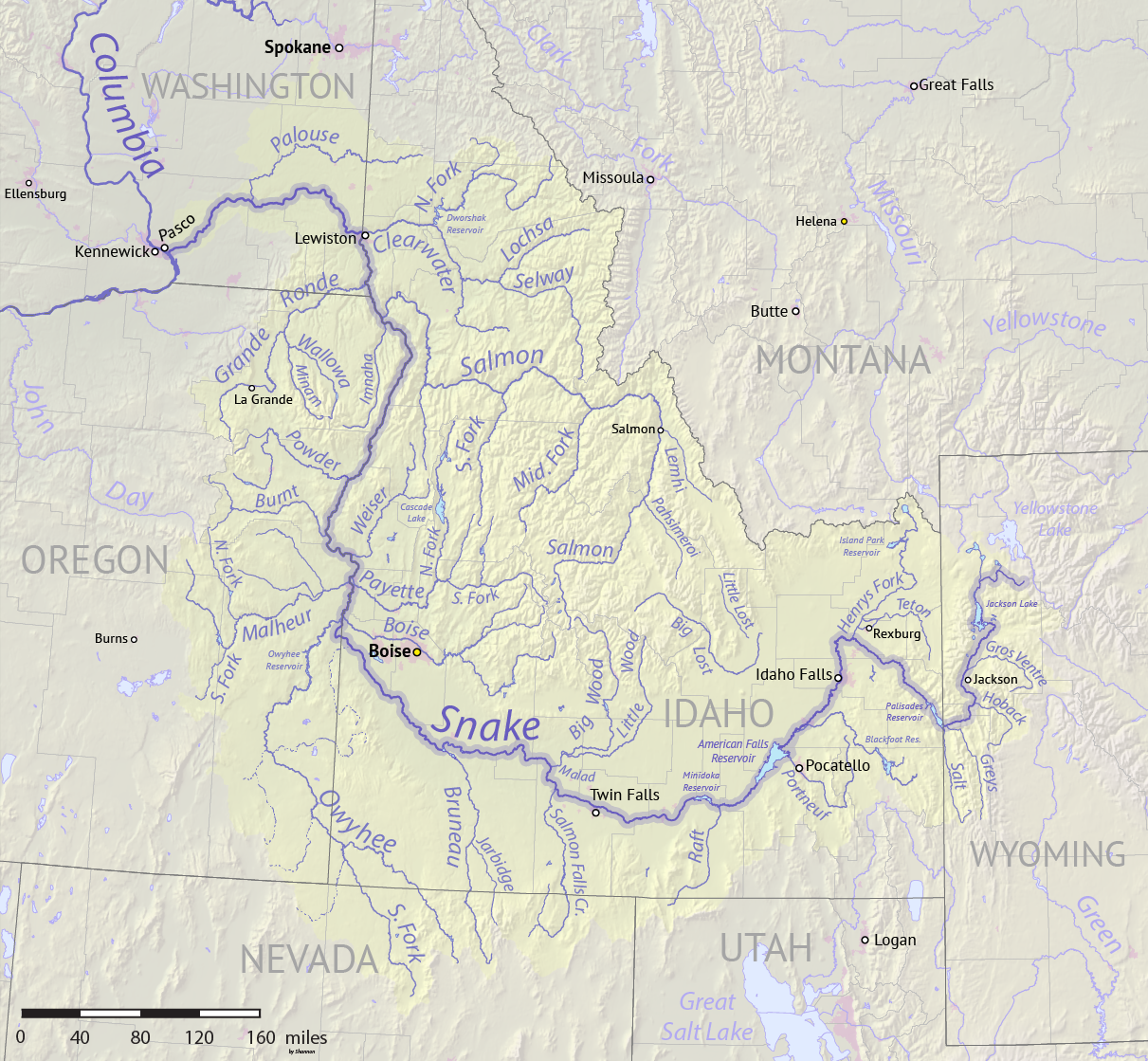
- Map of the Snake River watershed
- Native name: Kimooenim (Nez Perce); Yampapah (Shoshoni)

Location
- Country: United States
- State: Wyoming, Idaho, Oregon, Washington
- Region: Pacific Northwest
- Cities: Jackson, Wyoming, Idaho Falls, Idaho, Blackfoot, Idaho, American Falls, Idaho, Burley, Idaho, Twin Falls, Idaho, Ontario, Oregon, Lewiston, Idaho, Clarkston, Washington, Tri-Cities, Washington

Physical characteristics
- Source: Rocky Mountains
  - location: Yellowstone National Park, Wyoming
  - coordinates: 44°07′49″N 110°13′10″W
  - elevation: 9,200 ft (2,800 m)
- Mouth: Columbia River at Lake Wallula
  - location: Burbank, Washington, near the Tri-Cities
  - coordinates: 46°11′10″N 119°1′43″W
  - elevation: 341 ft (104 m)
- Length: 1,080 mi (1,740 km)
- Basin size: 107,500 sq mi (278,000 km^{2})
- Discharge
  - location: Ice Harbor Dam, Washington, 9 1/2 miles (15.3 km) above the mouth, 1962–2023 average
  - average: 49,580 cu ft/s (1,404 m^{3}/s)
  - minimum: 2,000 cu ft/s (57 m^{3}/s)
  - maximum: 305,000 cu ft/s (8,600 m^{3}/s)

Basin features
- Tributaries
  - left: Gros Ventre River, Salt River, Blackfoot River, Portneuf River, Bruneau River, Owyhee River, Malheur River, Burnt River, Powder River, Imnaha River, Grande Ronde River, Tucannon River
  - right: Henrys Fork, Malad River, Boise River, Payette River, Weiser River, Salmon River, Clearwater River, Palouse River

National Wild and Scenic River
- Type: Wild 260.8 miles (419.7 km); Scenic 186.4 miles (300.0 km); Recreational 33.8 miles (54.4 km)
- Reference no.: P.L. 94-199; P.L. 111-11

The Snake River is a major river in the interior Pacific Northwest region of the United States. About 1,080 miles (1,740 km) long, it is the largest tributary of the Columbia River, which is the largest North American river that empties into the Pacific Ocean. Beginning in Yellowstone National Park, western Wyoming, it flows across the arid Snake River Plain of southern Idaho, the rugged Hells Canyon on the borders of Idaho, Oregon and Washington, and finally the rolling Palouse Hills of southeast Washington. It joins the Columbia River just downstream from the Tri-Cities, Washington, in the southern Columbia Basin.

The river's watershed, which drains parts of six U.S. states, is situated between the Rocky Mountains to the north and east, the Great Basin to the south, and the Blue Mountains and Oregon high desert to the west. The region has a long history of volcanism; millions of years ago, Columbia River basalts covered vast areas of the western Snake River watershed, while the Snake River Plain was a product of the Yellowstone volcanic hotspot. The river was further altered by catastrophic flooding in the most recent Ice Age, which created such features as the Snake River Canyon and Shoshone Falls.

The Snake River once hosted some of the largest North American runs of salmon and other anadromous fish. For thousands of years, salmon fishing has played a central role in the culture and diet of indigenous peoples. The Shoshone and Nez Perce were the largest of several tribes that lived along the river by the turn of the 19th century. In 1805, while searching for a route from the eastern US to the Pacific, Lewis and Clark became the first non-natives to see the river. Fur trappers explored more of the watershed, and drove beaver to near extinction as the Americans and British vied for control of Oregon Territory.

Although travelers on the Oregon Trail initially shunned the dry and rocky Snake River region, a flood of settlers followed gold discoveries in the 1860s, leading to decades of military conflict and the eventual expulsion of tribes to reservations. At the turn of the 20th century, some of the first large irrigation projects in the western US were developed along the Snake River. South-central Idaho earned the nickname "Magic Valley" with the rapid transformation of desert into farmland. Numerous hydroelectric dams were also constructed, and four navigation dams on its lower section created a shipping channel to Lewiston, Idaho – the furthest inland seaport on the West Coast.

While dam construction, commercial fishing and other human activities have greatly reduced anadromous fish populations since the late 19th century, the Snake River watershed is still considered important habitat for these fish. The Snake and its tributary, the Salmon River, host the longest sockeye salmon run in the world, stretching 900 miles (1,400 km) from the Pacific to Redfish Lake in Idaho. Since the 1950s, public agencies, tribal governments and private utilities have invested heavily in fishery restoration and hatchery programs, with limited success. The proposed removal of the four lower Snake River dams for fish passage is a significant ongoing policy debate in the Pacific Northwest.

== Course ==
The Snake River starts to the north of Two Ocean Pass near the southern border of Yellowstone National Park, about 9,200 feet (2,800 m) above sea level in the Rocky Mountains of Wyoming. The river descends west through the high mountains of the Teton Wilderness meeting the Lewis River and continuing south into Jackson Lake in Grand Teton National Park, a natural glacial lake enlarged by Jackson Lake Dam. Joined by Pacific Creek and Buffalo Fork below the dam, it meanders southward through the alpine valley of Jackson Hole situated on the plain in front of the Teton Range to the west and the Gros Ventre Range to the east.

Below the town of Jackson it forms the Snake River Canyon of Wyoming, turns west and crosses into Idaho, where the Palisades Dam forms Palisades Reservoir. From there it flows northwest through Swan Valley to join the Henrys Fork on an alluvial plain near Rexburg. The Henrys Fork is sometimes called the "North Fork" of the Snake River, while the section of the main Snake River above their confluence is sometimes called the "South Fork".

Aerial view of the river's westward course from the Tetons (upper left) toward Swan Valley, Idaho

Turning southwest, the river begins its long journey across the Snake River Plain, passing through Idaho Falls and receiving the Blackfoot River from the left before entering the 20-mile (32 km)-long American Falls Reservoir, formed by American Falls Dam. From American Falls it turns west, flowing through Minidoka Dam and Milner Dam, where large volumes of water are diverted for irrigation. Below Milner Dam it enters the Snake River Canyon of Idaho, where the river narrows, forming rapids and waterfalls. In the 70-mile (110 km) stretch between Milner Dam and the confluence with the Malad River near Hagerman Fossil Beds National Monument, the Snake River descends a total of 1,300 feet (400 m) over a series of cataracts and rapids, chief of which include Caldron Linn, Twin, Shoshone, Pillar, Auger, and Salmon Falls. Idaho Power operates several small hydroelectric plants along this stretch of the river. The largest single drop is 212-foot (65 m) Shoshone Falls, which in the spring flows with such force that 19th-century writers called it the "Niagara of the West".

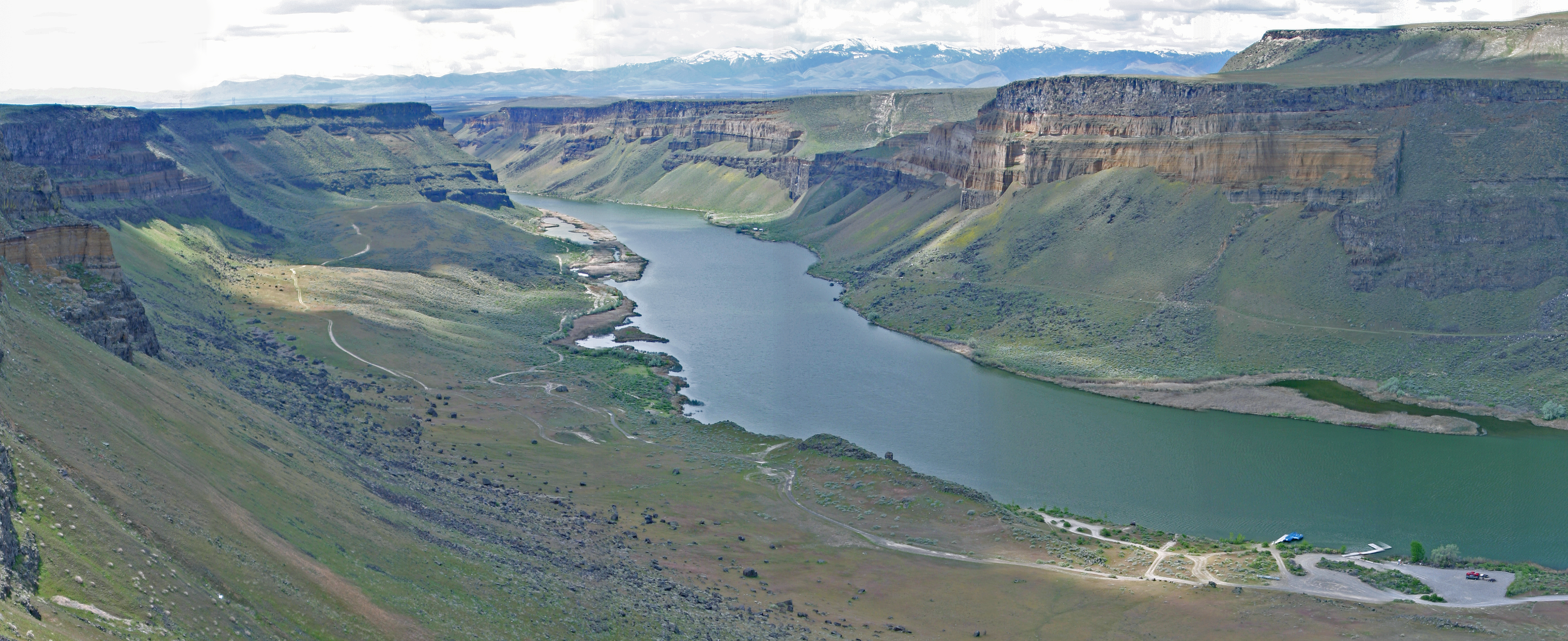
The Snake River flows through canyons in the Morley Nelson Snake River Birds of Prey National Conservation Area, south of Boise.

The Snake River continues flowing west, through the C. J. Strike Reservoir where it is joined from the left by the Bruneau River, then through the Morley Nelson Snake River Birds of Prey National Conservation Area before entering farmland on the western side of Idaho's Treasure Valley. (Note: The Treasure Valley was historically known as the Boise Valley or Snake River Valley, and was only given the modern name in 1959. Uses of the name "Boise Valley" in this article, in a historical context, refer to the Treasure Valley.) Passing 30 miles (48 km) west of Boise, it crosses briefly into Oregon before turning north to form the Oregon–Idaho border. It is joined by several major tributaries in quick succession – the Boise River from the right, the Owyhee and Malheur Rivers from the left, the Payette and Weiser Rivers from the right near Ontario, Oregon, then the Powder and Burnt Rivers from the left. Continuing north, the river enters Hells Canyon, which slices between the Rocky Mountains of Idaho and the Blue Mountains of Oregon and Washington. The Hells Canyon Hydroelectric Complex includes the Brownlee, Oxbow and Hells Canyon Dams in the upper reaches of the canyon. Since its construction in 1967, Hells Canyon Dam has been the upriver limit for migrating salmon; in the past, salmon swam as far upriver as Shoshone Falls.

Emerging from Hells Canyon Dam, the Snake surges northward through the Hells Canyon Wilderness, where the majority of the river corridor is accessible only by boat and numerous Class III-IV rapids historically posed a major barrier to navigation. Today, the canyon and the surrounding Hells Canyon National Recreation Area are a popular location for whitewater boating, fishing, horseback riding and backpacking. With the adjacent Seven Devils Mountains rising up to 8,000 feet (2,400 m) above the river, Hells Canyon is one of the deepest canyons in North America, almost one-third deeper than the Grand Canyon. Within the canyon it is joined from the left by the Imnaha River, then from the right by its longest tributary, the Salmon River. Further north, it begins to form the Idaho–Washington border, and receives the Grande Ronde River from the left. From the end of Hells Canyon at Asotin, Washington, it flows north to Lewiston, Idaho, where it is joined from the right by the Clearwater River, its largest tributary by volume. The Snake then turns sharply west to enter Washington.

The final stretch of the Snake River flows through steep-sided valleys in the Palouse Hills of southeast Washington. Near Lyons Ferry State Park, it is joined from the left by the Tucannon River, then from the right by the Palouse River, which forms Palouse Falls about 8 miles (13 km) upstream of its confluence with the Snake. The Lower Snake River Project consists of four dams equipped with navigation locks – Lower Granite, Little Goose, Lower Monumental and Ice Harbor – which have transformed the once fast-flowing lower Snake River into a series of lakes, enabling heavy barges to travel between the Columbia River and the Port of Lewiston. About 10 miles (16 km) downstream from Ice Harbor Dam, the Snake empties into the Columbia River at Burbank, Washington, southeast of the Tri-Cities. The confluence is located on Lake Wallula, the impoundment behind McNary Dam on the Columbia, 341 feet (104 m) above sea level. From there, the Columbia River flows another 325 miles (523 km) west to empty into the Pacific Ocean.

=== Discharge ===
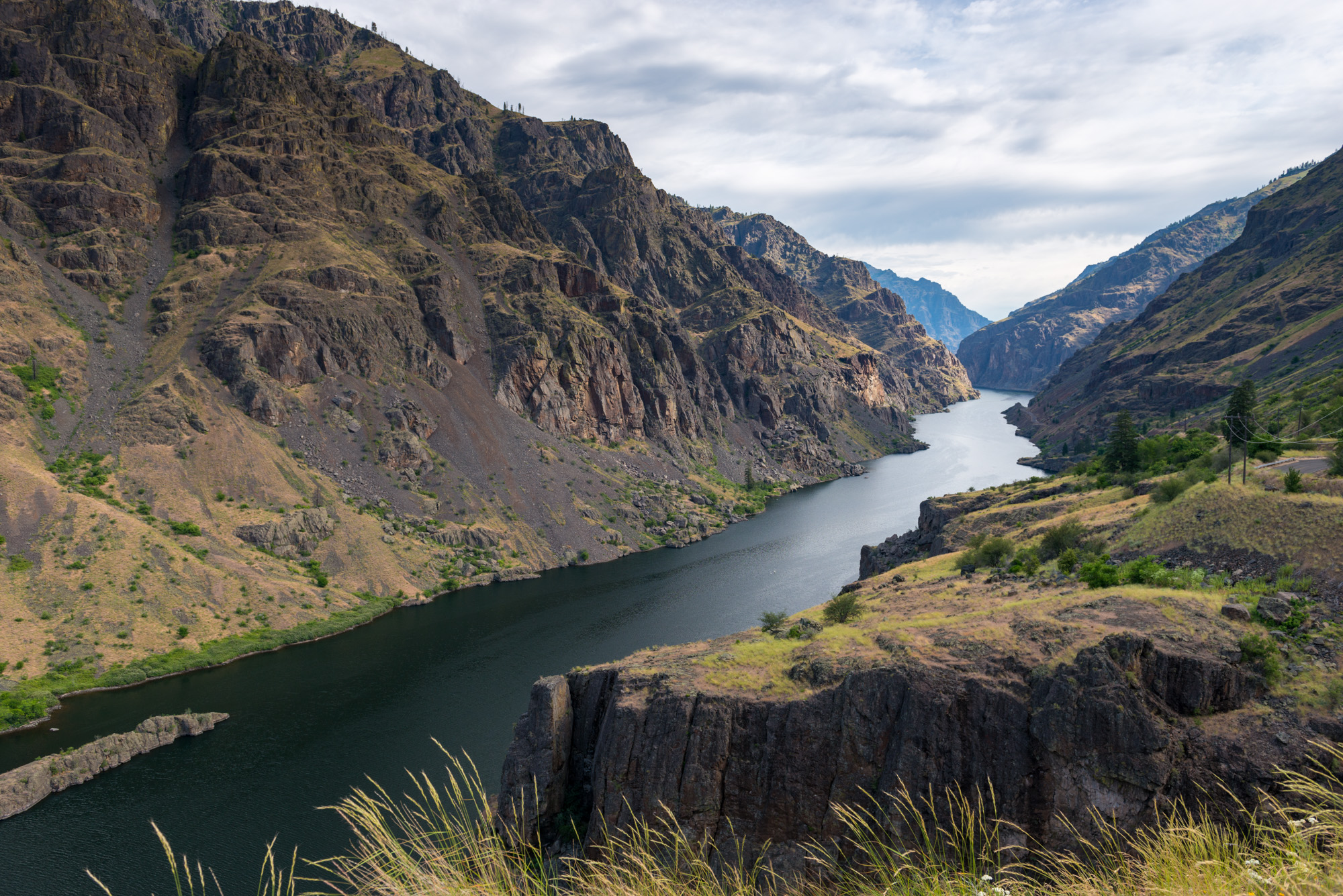
The Snake River in Hells Canyon

The U.S. Army Corps of Engineers has measured the discharge, or flow rate, of the Snake River at Ice Harbor Dam since 1962. The mean annual discharge for the 61-year period between 1962 and 2023 was 49,580 cubic feet per second (1,404 m^{3}/s), with a maximum recorded daily mean of 305,000 cu ft/s (8,600 m^{3}/s) on June 19, 1974, and a minimum daily mean of 2,000 cu ft/s (57 m^{3}/s) on November 29, 1961. A historic June 1894 flood at the Ice Harbor site reached an estimated peak of 409,000 cu ft/s (11,600 m^{3}/s). In terms of discharge, the Snake River is the twelfth largest river in the United States, and it contributes about one-fifth of the Columbia's total outflow into the Pacific.

The volume of the Snake River peaks in late spring and early summer as snow melts in the Rocky Mountains, and reaches its lowest point in the fall. Despite the numerous dams regulating its flow, its discharge into the Columbia remains highly seasonal. At Ice Harbor Dam, the mean monthly discharge is highest in May and June at over 100,000 cu ft/s (2,800 m^{3}/s), and lowest in September and October at less than 25,000 cu ft/s (710 m^{3}/s). Mean annual discharge also fluctuates significantly, from a record high of 86,240 cu ft/s (2,442 m^{3}/s) in 1965, to a low of 27,890 cu ft/s (790 m^{3}/s) in 1997.

In southern Idaho, Snake River flows are significantly influenced by the Eastern Snake River Plain Aquifer. One of the largest groundwater reserves in the US, the aquifer is founded in porous volcanic rock underneath the plain. It absorbs and stores large volumes of water from the Snake River in the eastern Plain to re-emerge further west as springs in the Snake River Canyon. Water from the lost streams of Idaho, several rivers that disappear underground in the eastern Plain, travels through the aquifer to reach the Snake River, as does excess irrigation water absorbed into the ground. The major spring complexes at American Falls and Thousand Springs (near Hagerman, Idaho) keep the river flowing steadily even in the driest of summers. At King Hill, about 50 miles (80 km) northwest of Twin Falls, water levels remain about 10,000 cu ft/s (280 m^{3}/s) for most of the year, increasing about 20 percent during snowmelt and decreasing about 20 percent with late summer irrigation diversions.

Despite its great length, the Snake River accumulates most of its water in the lower one-fourth of its course. By the time it reaches Hells Canyon Dam, 247 miles (398 km) from the mouth, the mean annual discharge is about 19,000 cu ft/s (540 m^{3}/s) – just over a third of the discharge at the mouth. Just two downstream tributaries, the Clearwater and Salmon Rivers, contribute about half of the total flow of the Snake.

== Watershed ==
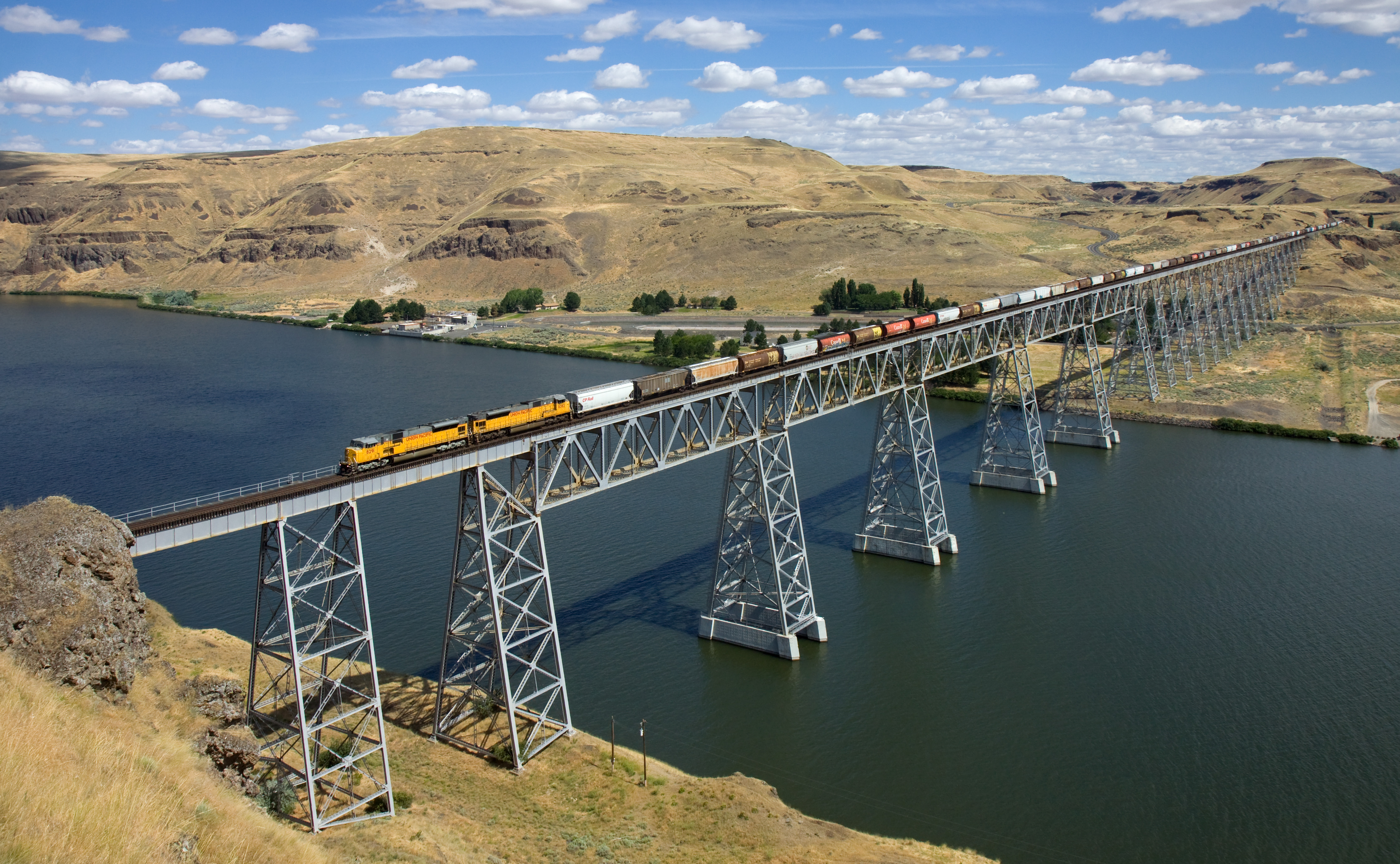
The Union Pacific Railroad crosses the lower Snake River via the Joso Bridge near Starbuck, Washington.

The 107,500-square-mile (278,000 km^{2}) Snake River watershed drains about 87 percent of the state of Idaho, 18 percent of Washington and 17 percent of Oregon, in addition to small portions of Wyoming, Utah and Nevada. From the Lost Trail Pass north of Salmon, Idaho to Tri-Basin Divide south of Afton, Wyoming, the eastern edge of the Snake River watershed follows the Continental Divide. As the Continental Divide also forms the Idaho–Montana border south of Lost Trail Pass, the Snake watershed touches Montana for a long distance, but does not extend into it. The Snake drains by far the largest area of any Columbia River tributary, making up about 40 percent of the entire Columbia River watershed. Compared with the Columbia above their confluence, the Snake River is about 180 miles (290 km) longer (Note: The Columbia River above the Snake has a length of approximately 900 miles (1,400 km).) and drains a similarly sized area, though the Columbia carries more than twice the volume of water.

The Snake River watershed is very mountainous, with the northern two-thirds of it occupied by vast mountain ranges of the Rockies, primarily the Salmon River Mountains of central Idaho and the Bitterroot Range along the Idaho–Montana border. The Blue Mountains form much of the western boundary of the Snake watershed from southeast Washington down into Oregon. To the south are numerous small isolated mountain ranges of the Basin and Range Province, such as the Independence and Albion Mountains. To the east are more ranges of the Rockies including the Tetons and the Wind River Range; the latter includes Gannett Peak, the highest point in the Snake River basin at 13,816 feet (4,211 m). Surface volcanic features – such as lava fields, cones, and thermal springs – are replete in the southern part of the Snake watershed, from Craters of the Moon National Monument northeast of Twin Falls to the Yellowstone caldera, while ancient lava flows of the Columbia River basalts underlie the western part of the watershed. The Snake River Plain is the largest area without mountains, but it still features rugged terrain, being crisscrossed by canyons formed by the Snake River and its tributaries.

Due to the rain shadow effect of the Cascades, precipitation as a whole is scant, averaging 14 inches (360 mm) across the entire watershed. Most precipitation falls at higher elevations as snow, thus, most runoff in the Snake River watershed derives from snowmelt. Jackson Hole, Wyoming experiences an alpine climate with an average of 30 in (760 mm) of rain and 252 in (6,400 mm) of snow. The coldest month is January, with a mean temperature of 13 °F (−11 °C), and the hottest is July at 57.7 °F (14.3 °C). Twin Falls experiences a semi-arid climate, with about 9 in (230 mm) of rain and 13 in (330 mm) of snow. Monthly mean temperatures range from 29.4 °F (−1.4 °C) in January to 73.1 °F (22.8 °C) in July. The Columbia Basin around the river's mouth also has a semi-arid climate, with about 10 in (250 mm) of rain and 5 in (130 mm) of snow as measured at Ice Harbor Dam. January is the coldest month with a mean temperature of 34.3 °F (1.3 °C), and July is the hottest month at 74.6 °F (23.7 °C).

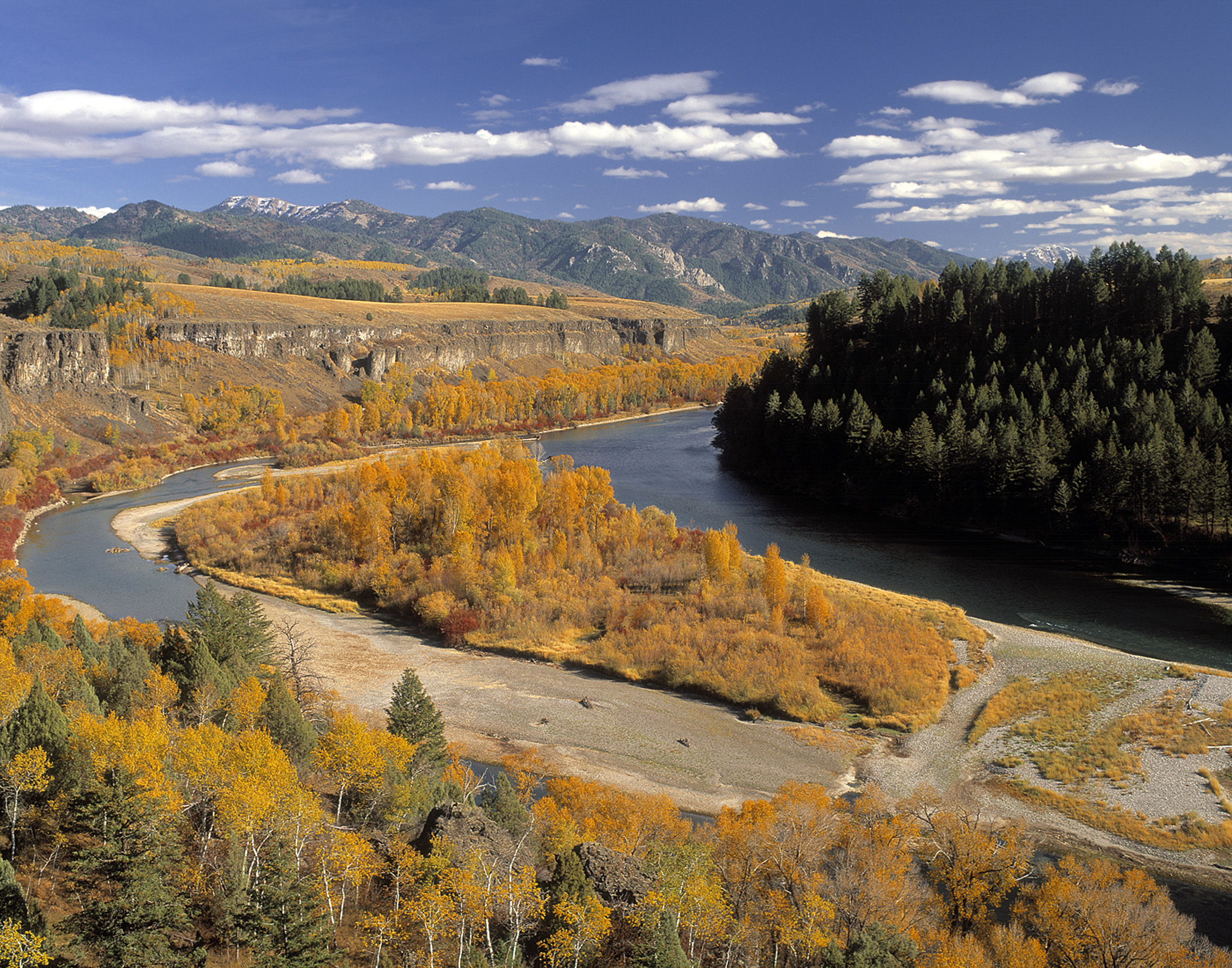
Fall colors along the Snake River upstream of the Henrys Fork, Idaho

Semi-arid shrubland and rangeland covers about 50 percent of the Snake River watershed. Natural vegetation is primarily sagebrush, mixed with wheatgrasses and bunchgrasses. About 30 percent of the watershed is farmland; irrigated farming of potatoes, sugar beets, onions, cereal grains and alfalfa are dominant in the Snake River Plain, while the Palouse Hills of the northwest host mainly dryland wheat and legume production. About 15 percent of the watershed is forested, distributed across two temperate coniferous forest ecoregions: South Central Rockies forests, consisting primarily of Douglas fir, Engelmann spruce, subalpine fir, and lodgepole pine, and North Central Rockies forests, which include mountain hemlock, white spruce, alpine fir and western larch. About 4 percent of the watershed is barren desert, and only about 1 percent is urbanized.

Most of the Snake River watershed is public land, with the U.S. Forest Service managing the Nez Perce, Clearwater, Bitterroot, Umatilla, Wallowa–Whitman, Payette, Boise, Salmon–Challis, Sawtooth, Caribou–Targhee and Bridger–Teton National Forests that cover much of the northern and eastern parts of the watershed. The forests contain numerous designated wilderness areas, including the Sawtooth, Selway–Bitterroot, Frank Church-River of No Return, Gospel Hump, Hells Canyon, Teton and Gros Ventre. National Park Service land includes Craters of the Moon National Monument and Yellowstone and Grand Teton National Parks. Large areas of privately owned farmland are concentrated in the Snake River Plain and the Palouse, though the majority of the Snake River Plain is Bureau of Land Management land.

The Snake River watershed borders several other major North American watersheds. To the south it borders the endorheic Great Basin, including the area draining to Utah's Great Salt Lake. To the east it borders the watersheds of the Green River (part of the Colorado River system which drains to the Sea of Cortez) and the Yellowstone and upper Missouri Rivers (part of the Mississippi River system which drains to the Gulf of Mexico). On the north it borders the watersheds of the Clark Fork and Spokane Rivers, both part of the Columbia River system. To the northwest it borders several other tributary watersheds of the Columbia River, including those of the John Day and Umatilla Rivers.

=== Major tributaries ===
Fifty-four named tributaries of the Snake River drain more than 100 square miles (260 km^{2}). Of these, the twelve listed below drain an area greater than 2,000 square miles (5,200 km^{2}).

Major tributaries of the Snake River
Name	Confluence location	Confluence coordinates	Confluence elevation	Length (mainstem)	Length (to furthest source) (Note: Measured to the head of the longest tributary beyond the head of the main stem.)	Watershed	Discharge	Picture
Henrys Fork	Rexburg, Idaho	43°45′10″N 111°57′28″W	4,800 ft (1,463 m)	129.3 mi (208.1 km)	129.3 mi (208.1 km)	3,260 mi^{2} (8,450 km^{2})	2,105 cu ft/s (59.7 m^{3}/s)	A waterfall plunges in lush coniferous forest
Salmon Falls Creek	Hagerman, Idaho	42°42′55″N 114°51′12″W	2,884 ft (879 m)	121.1 mi (195.0 km)	152.6 mi (245.7 km) (Note: To the head of Sun Creek.)	2,120 mi^{2} (5,500 km^{2})	151 cu ft/s (4.3 m^{3}/s)	A gently flowing stream at the bottom of a desert canyon
Malad River	Hagerman, Idaho	42°51′45″N 114°54′18″W	2,658 ft (810 m)	12.0 mi (19.3 km)	149.0 mi (239.9 km) (Note: To the head of Big Wood River.)	3,250 mi^{2} (8,420 km^{2})	1,500 cu ft/s (42.5 m^{3}/s) (Note: A significant amount of water is diverted just above the mouth of Malad River for hydropower generation and discharged into the Snake River. Malad River discharge is calculated by the sum of USGS gage # 13153500 (Malad River near Bliss) and #13152940 (Malad River hydropower diversion))	A powerful waterfall and rapids cut through jumbled rocks
Bruneau River	Mountain Home, Idaho	42°56′57″N 115°57′43″W	2,457 ft (749 m)	152.9 mi (246.2 km)	152.9 mi (246.2 km)	3,290 mi^{2} (8,530 km^{2})	375 cu ft/s (10.6 m^{3}/s)	A stream calmly flows by at the bottom of light gray cliffs
Owyhee River	Nyssa, Oregon	43°48′46″N 117°01′32″W	2,185 ft (666 m)	346.5 mi (557.9 km)	346.5 mi (557.9 km)	10,950 mi^{2} (28,380 km^{2})	918 cu ft/s (26.0 m^{3}/s)	View over a river bend in a shrubby desert landscape framed by vertical cliffs
Boise River	Parma, Idaho	43°49′15″N 117°01′34″W	2,185 ft (666 m)	103.1 mi (166.0 km)	155.5 mi (250.4 km) (Note: To the head of Middle Fork Boise River.)	4,010 mi^{2} (10,390 km^{2})	1,574 cu ft/s (44.6 m^{3}/s)	A river flows under a steel bridge through a wooded area
Malheur River	Ontario, Oregon	44°03′33″N 116°58′31″W	2,133 ft (650 m)	189.8 mi (305.6 km)	205.7 mi (331.2 km) (Note: To the head of Lake Creek.)	4,710 mi^{2} (12,210 km^{2})	208 cu ft/s (5.9 m^{3}/s)	A river forms multiple channels as it flows through a desert valley
Payette River	Payette, Idaho	44°05′32″N 116°57′09″W	2,126 ft (648 m)	82.7 mi (133.1 km)	163.0 mi (262.4 km) (Note: To the head of South Fork Payette River.)	3,300 mi^{2} (8,550 km^{2})	2,960 cu ft/s (83.8 m^{3}/s)	A river flows through grassy meadows surrounded by coniferous forest
Salmon River	Hells Canyon NRA, Idaho	45°51′23″N 116°47′37″W	919 ft (280 m)	425.3 mi (684.7 km)	425.3 mi (684.7 km)	14,000 mi^{2} (36,290 km^{2})	11,090 cu ft/s (314.0 m^{3}/s)	River rapids cut through a mountain landscape, with several boaters visible in the foreground
Grande Ronde River	Rogersburg, Washington	46°04′49″N 116°58′47″W	820 ft (250 m)	210.4 mi (338.7 km)	210.4 mi (338.7 km)	4,130 mi^{2} (10,710 km^{2})	3,027 cu ft/s (85.7 m^{3}/s)	View over a river bend framed by high cliffs of horizontally layered rock
Clearwater River	Lewiston, Idaho	46°25′30″N 117°02′14″W	738 ft (220 m)	74.8 mi (120.4 km)	198.3 mi (319.2 km) (Note: To the head of Selway River.)	9,420 mi^{2} (24,420 km^{2})	14,860 cu ft/s (420.8 m^{3}/s)	A wide river flows through coniferous forest in a mountain valley
Palouse River	Starbuck, Washington	46°35′24″N 118°12′55″W	541 ft (165 m)	166.4 mi (267.9 km)	166.4 mi (267.9 km)	3,320 mi^{2} (8,610 km^{2})	599 cu ft/s (17.0 m^{3}/s)	View over a desert river canyon surrounded by vertical cliffs

== Geology ==
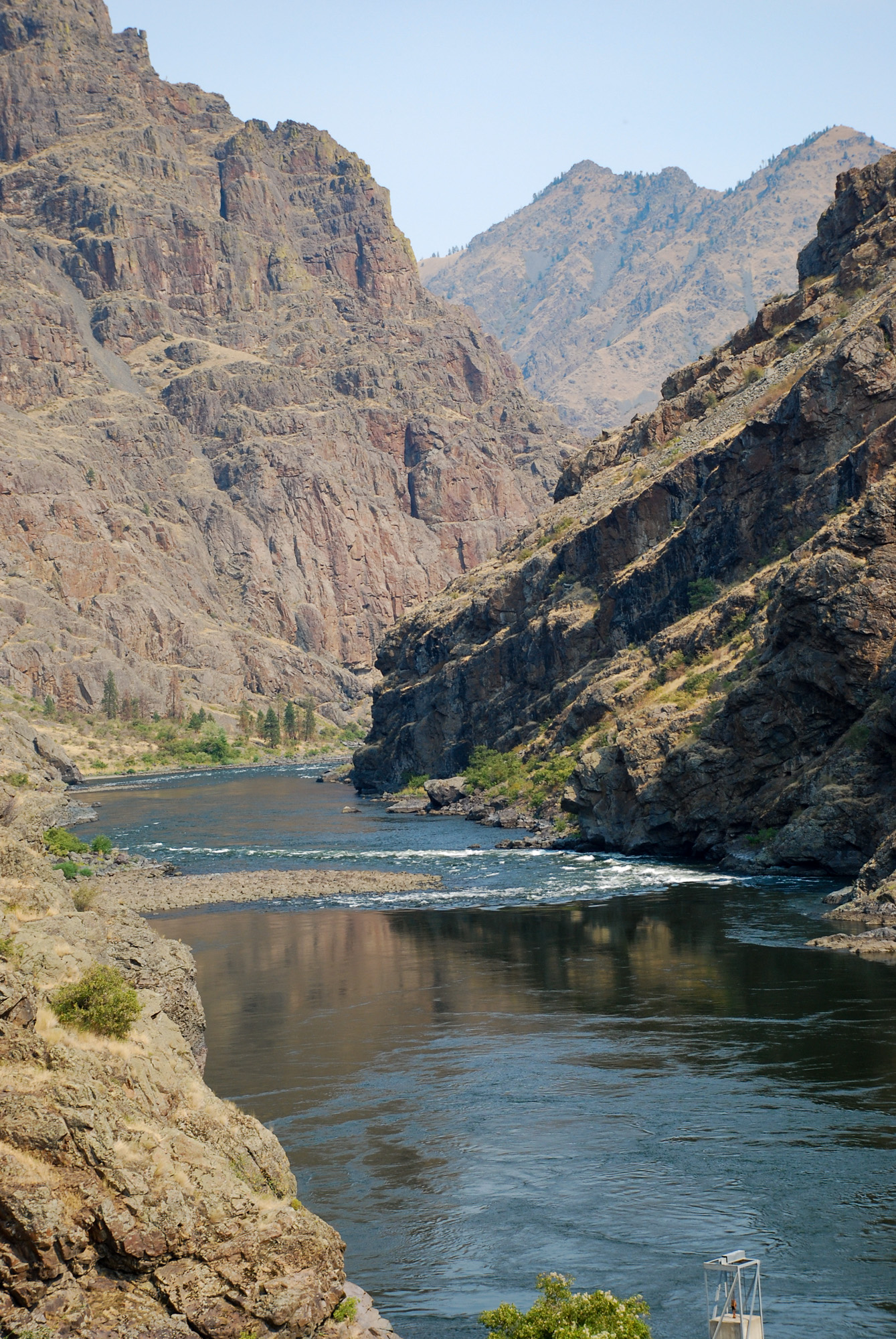
Hells Canyon, the connection between the Snake River Plain and the lower Snake River drainage systems, formed about 2.5 million years ago from the overflow of Lake Idaho.

The present-day course of the Snake River was pieced together over millions of years from several formerly disconnected drainage systems. Much of what would become the Pacific Northwest lay under shallow seas until it was uplifted starting about 60 million years ago (Ma). The outlet of the ancestral Columbia River to the Pacific was established about 40 Ma. By about 17 Ma, the "Salmon-Clearwater River", or the modern day lower Snake River, flowed west into the Columbia and on to the Pacific. Another ancient river system drained what is now the western Snake River Plain. Some geologists propose that this flowed to the Columbia on a course south of the present-day Blue Mountains, while others propose it drained towards Northern California. The Columbia River basalts, a series of massive flood basalt events that engulfed the Columbia Basin and surrounding lands, reshaped the landscape and erased most evidence of the pre-volcanic river channels starting about 17 Ma. Erupting from fissures in the southern Columbia Basin, the first basalt flows pushed the ancient Salmon-Clearwater much further north than its present course.

About 12–10 Ma, the Blue Mountains region began to experience uplift, raising the basalt layers to form a plateau. From about 11–9 Ma, crustal deformation related to the Yellowstone hotspot caused the western half of the Snake River Plain near Boise to sink, creating a graben-type valley between parallel fault zones to the northeast and southwest. The outlet of the ancient Snake River was blocked, and water accumulated to form the vast Lake Idaho starting about 10 Ma. The eastern half of the Snake River Plain formed as the North American Plate moved westward over the Yellowstone hotspot. Upwelling magma caused the continental crust to rise, forming highlands in a similar fashion to the modern Yellowstone plateau and leaving behind enormous basalt flows in its wake.

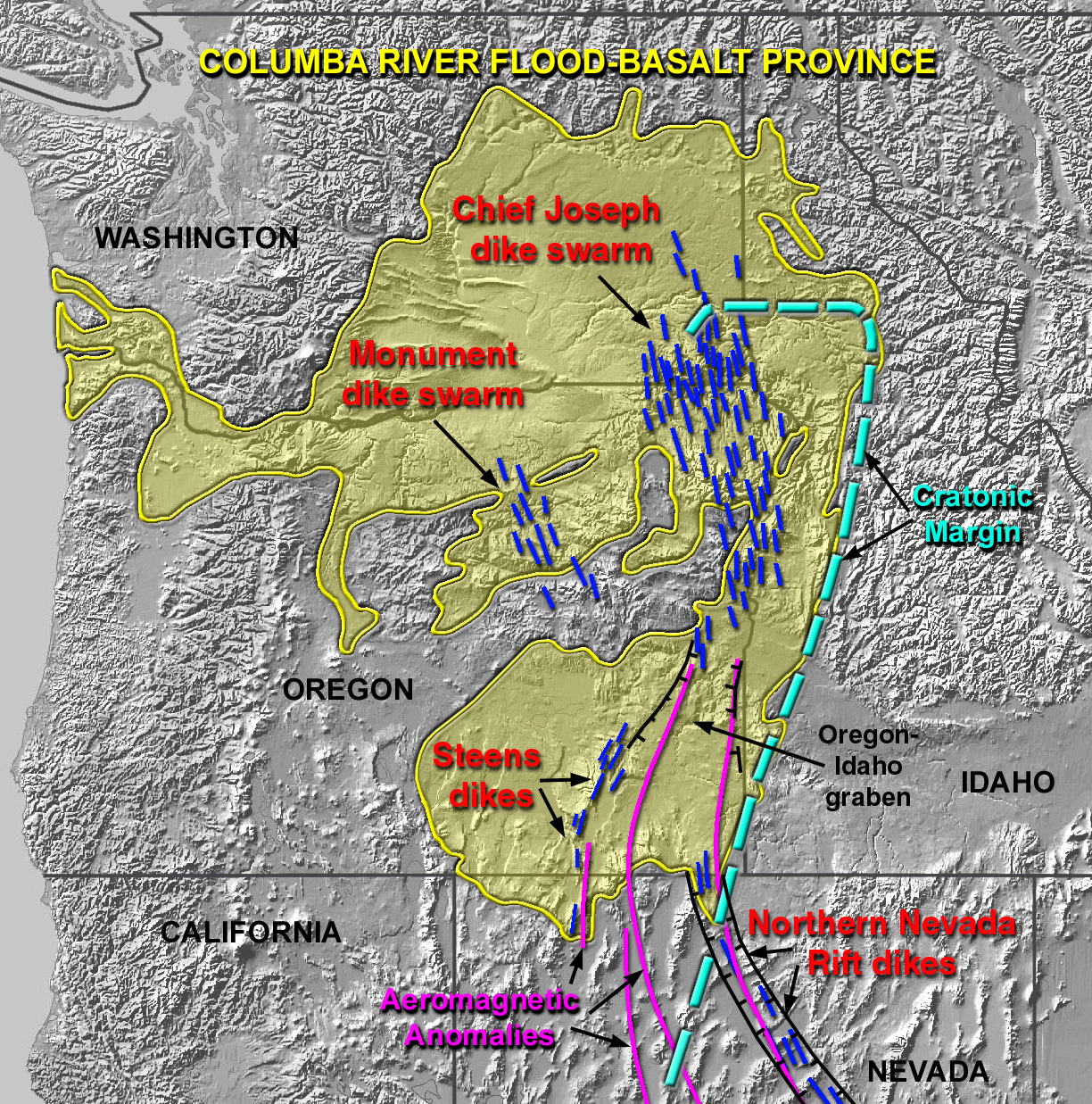
The Columbia River Basalt Province covers a vast area of the inland Pacific Northwest.

As the hotspot migrated east relative to the North American Plate, the land behind it collapsed and sank, creating the geographic depression of the eastern Snake River Plain. The gradual eastward migration of this topographic high had the effect of pushing the Continental Divide to the east. Prior to the formation of the eastern Snake River Plain, the drainage area east of Arco, Idaho – the modern headwaters and upper course of the Snake River – flowed towards the Atlantic Ocean via the Mississippi River system. However, about 4.5 Ma, the eastward migrating Continental Divide tilted the regional slope such that drainage reversed, and flowed west into Lake Idaho. This was evidenced by an increase of water levels of Lake Idaho at that time. The Snake River Plain drainage system continued to expand east, towards what is now Yellowstone National Park. During this expansion, the Snake also captured the Bear River, which was later rerouted towards its modern outlet in the Great Salt Lake Basin about 50,000 or 60,000 years ago by lava flows in southeast Idaho.

In the Columbia Basin about 10.5 Ma, the Elephant Mountain basalt eruption forced the Salmon-Clearwater River into roughly its present course through southeast Washington. By 8.5 Ma the Salmon-Clearwater was established in the Columbia River's modern path through Wallula Gap, although the Columbia itself still flowed somewhere to the west, nearer to the Cascades south of Yakima. The last of the Columbia basalt flows occurred around 6 Ma; by then, the present-day confluence of the Columbia River and Salmon-Clearwater had been established, with the combined flow draining through Wallula Gap. About 2.5 Ma, Lake Idaho reached a maximum elevation of 3,600 feet (1,100 m) above modern sea level, and overflowed northward into the Salmon-Clearwater drainage near present-day Huntington, Oregon. Over a period of about two million years, the outflow carved Hells Canyon, emptying Lake Idaho and uniting the upper Snake and Salmon-Clearwater into a single river system.

The Teton Range, a defining topographic feature of the modern Snake River headwaters, first began to rise about 10 Ma as the Teton Fault began to move, displacing the mountain block upward as the surrounding land dropped. About 2 Ma, the Hoback Fault formed east of the Tetons, and a graben valley developed between the Hoback and Teton fault zones, creating Jackson Hole. As the valley dropped, water filled it to create Lake Teewinot, which drained east into the Green River–Colorado River system. About 1 Ma, the Snake River captured the Jackson Hole watershed, draining Lake Teewinot instead of the Green River, and finally connecting the modern-day Snake headwaters to the rest of the river. This landscape around the Snake headwaters was sculpted by multiple Ice Age glaciations. Starting about 200,000 years ago, the Buffalo glaciation filled Jackson Hole to a depth of 2,000 feet (610 m). Ice flowed down the Snake River Canyon all the way to Idaho. The Bull Lake glaciation, about 80,000–35,000 years ago, and the Pinedale glaciation, ending about 15,000 years ago, were much smaller and did not fill the entire valley. These glaciations carved the distinctive peaks of the Tetons into their present form and scoured lake basins in the valley floor, including modern-day Jackson Lake.

A map of Pleistocene lakes in the Great Basin, showing the path of the Bonneville flood along the Snake River about 14,500 years ago

While the Snake River course beyond Jackson Hole was not directly impacted by glaciations, its landscape was dramatically changed by Ice Age flooding events. About 30,000 years ago, the climate of western North America was much wetter than today. The Great Salt Lake Basin filled with water to form the massive Lake Bonneville, about the size of modern-day Lake Michigan. About 15,000 years ago the lip of Red Rock Pass south of present-day Pocatello, Idaho abruptly collapsed, releasing a tremendous volume of water from Lake Bonneville into the Snake River Plain. The peak of the flood was about 500 times bigger than the largest recorded flood of the Snake at Idaho Falls in modern times. The flood completely altered the landscape of the Snake River Plain, creating the Snake River Canyon and its waterfalls, vast boulder fields, cliffs and coulees. The floodwaters then emptied through Hells Canyon.

However, most evidence of the Bonneville Floods on the lower Snake River was erased by the much larger Missoula Floods that engulfed the Columbia Basin during the same period. Caused by the repeated collapse of an ice dam in western Montana, dozens of floods back-flowed into the lower Snake River from the north, backing water as far upstream as Lewiston. The formerly west-flowing Palouse River was rerouted to flow south into the Snake River, forming Palouse Falls, whose outsized plunge pool attests to the force of the floods.

== History ==
=== Indigenous peoples ===
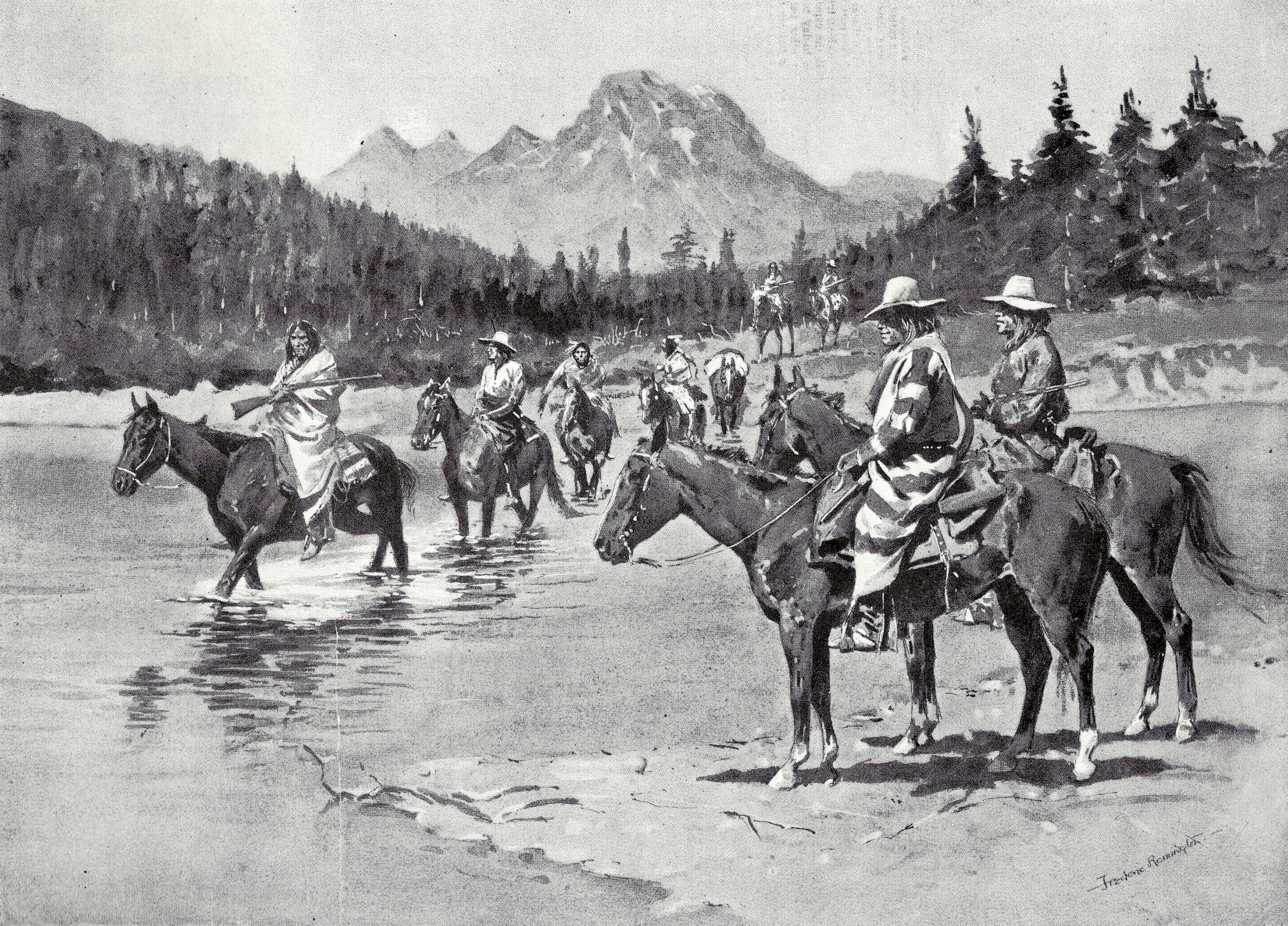
Bannock hunting party fording the Snake River southwest of the Tetons, illustration by Frederic Remington c. 1895

Starting around the end of the last glacial period, the Snake River Plain was inhabited by hunter-gatherers of the ancient Clovis (10000–9000 BCE), Folsom (9000–8000 BCE) and Plano (8600–5800 BCE) cultures. Along the lower Snake River in Washington, the Marmes Rockshelter – flooded in 1968 after the construction of Lower Monumental Dam – has yielded archeological evidence of continuous human occupation from about 9000 BCE until about 1300 CE. Starting about 2200 BCE, people in the western Snake River basin began to adopt a semi-sedentary lifestyle, with an increased reliance on fish (primarily salmon) and food preservation and storage. Shoshoni-speaking peoples arrived in the Snake River Plain between 600 and 1500 CE.

By the time of first European contact, the Snake River watershed was populated by several Native American tribes. The territory of the Nez Perce (Nimiipuu) stretched across what is now north-central Idaho, southeast Washington and northeast Oregon, including much of the lower Snake River below Hells Canyon, most of the Clearwater and Grande Ronde River, and the lower Salmon River. The Northern Shoshone and the Bannock, a Northern Paiute group that became culturally associated with the Shoshone, occupied an area stretching from the Snake River Plain east to the Rocky Mountains and south towards the Great Basin, as well as valleys of the upper Salmon River. A Nez Perce name for the river was Kimooenim or variations thereof, meaning "the stream/place of the hemp weed". Another Nez Perce name for the Snake River was Pikúunen, specifically referring to the stretch upstream of the Clearwater confluence. The Wanapum and Walla Walla people called the lower Snake River below the Clearwater Naxíyam Wána. The Shoshone called the river Yampapah, after the yampah plant that grew profusely along its banks.

Downriver of Shoshone Falls, salmon and their cousins such as steelhead trout – anadromous fish which spend their adult lives in the ocean, returning to fresh water to spawn – were a key food source for indigenous peoples, and were of great cultural importance. Rituals such as the first salmon ceremony were widely observed along the Columbia, Snake and other Northwest rivers, and so were strict catch limits, such that a healthy number of salmon would survive to reach their natal streams. The Nez Perce had more than seventy permanent villages among their fishing grounds on the Snake, Clearwater and Salmon Rivers. Clans gathered at communal fishing sites starting about May or June. Fishing moved from the lower rivers to higher elevation streams throughout the summer, while fall-run fish were preserved for winter use.

Shoshones in the western part of the Snake River Plain also depended heavily on the salmon run. At Shoshone Falls and the smaller cataracts downstream, fishing platforms, temporary brush weirs, spears, baskets and fish traps were employed at large scale. Captain Benjamin Bonneville in 1832 observed that "Indians at Salmon Falls on the Snake River took several thousand salmon in one afternoon by means of spears." To the east and upriver of the falls, many Shoshone and Bannock lived in more nomadic groups, traveling to the falls during the spring salmon run then gathering camas bulbs and hunting bison through the summer and autumn months.

The Snake River at Hells Canyon formed a natural dividing line between the Nez Perce and Shoshone, who considered each other enemies. The Nez Perce allied with the Cayuse against the Shoshone, Bannock and Northern Paiute, and stopped the latter from expanding their territory towards the Columbia Plateau. Both the Nez Perce and Shoshone acquired horses in the late 1600s or early 1700s, enabling far-reaching trade and hunting expeditions. With horses, the Nez Perce were able to travel east of the Bitterroot Mountains to hunt bison, via the trail over Lolo Pass, which the Lewis and Clark expedition would later follow in order to reach the Snake and Columbia Rivers.

==== Origin of name ====
The river's modern name comes from a misunderstanding of the Shoshone Tribal Sign in PISL. The Plains Indians referred to the Shoshone people as "Snake People", while the Shoshone are believed to have referred to themselves as "People of the River of Many Fish". However, the Shoshone sign for "salmon" was the same or similar to the Plains Indian common sign for "snake." The English name for the river was likely derived from this interpretation of the hand gesture, although it is uncertain when the name was first used.

=== Exploration and fur trade ===
The first Euro-Americans to reach the Snake River watershed were the Lewis and Clark Expedition, who in August 1805 crossed the Continental Divide at Lemhi Pass and descended to the Salmon River at what is now Salmon, Idaho, naming the stream "Lewis's River". Thwarted by the river's rapids, they were forced to cross the Bitterroot Mountains via the Nez Perce trail at Lolo Pass. After paddling down the Kooskooskee (Clearwater River), they reached the junction with the Snake and camped there with the Nez Perces on October 10, 1805. They correctly surmised that the river coming from the south was a continuation of "Lewis's" or Salmon River. The expedition journals note the Nez Perce called it Kimooenim, although William Clark later erased mentions of the name to replace with "Lewis's". Six days later they reached the confluence of the Snake and Columbia Rivers, after noting a number of dangerous rapids as well as many native fishing sites on the lower Snake. The expedition established friendly relations with the Nez Perces, who they visited again on their return trip in 1806.

Other explorers quickly followed, many of them fur trappers who began scouting the upper Snake River watershed for beaver. John Colter, a former member of the Lewis and Clark expedition, explored the Jackson Hole area in 1808. In 1810, Andrew Henry explored and named the Henrys Fork of the Snake River. He established Fort Henry, the first American fur trading post west of the Rocky Mountains, but abandoned it after that year's harsh winter. The 1811 Pacific Fur Company expedition led by Wilson Price Hunt attempted to find a route from Henrys Fork to the Columbia River. After suffering a wreck in the falls of the Snake River Canyon, they took an overland route through the Snake River Plain, through what is now the Boise Valley or Treasure Valley, then crossed the Blue Mountains to bypass Hells Canyon and reach the lower Snake River. After the hazardous experience, Hunt gave it the name "Mad River". A group led by Robert Stuart, a member of the Hunt expedition, returned eastward across the plain the following year. The route they mapped would eventually become that section of the Oregon Trail.

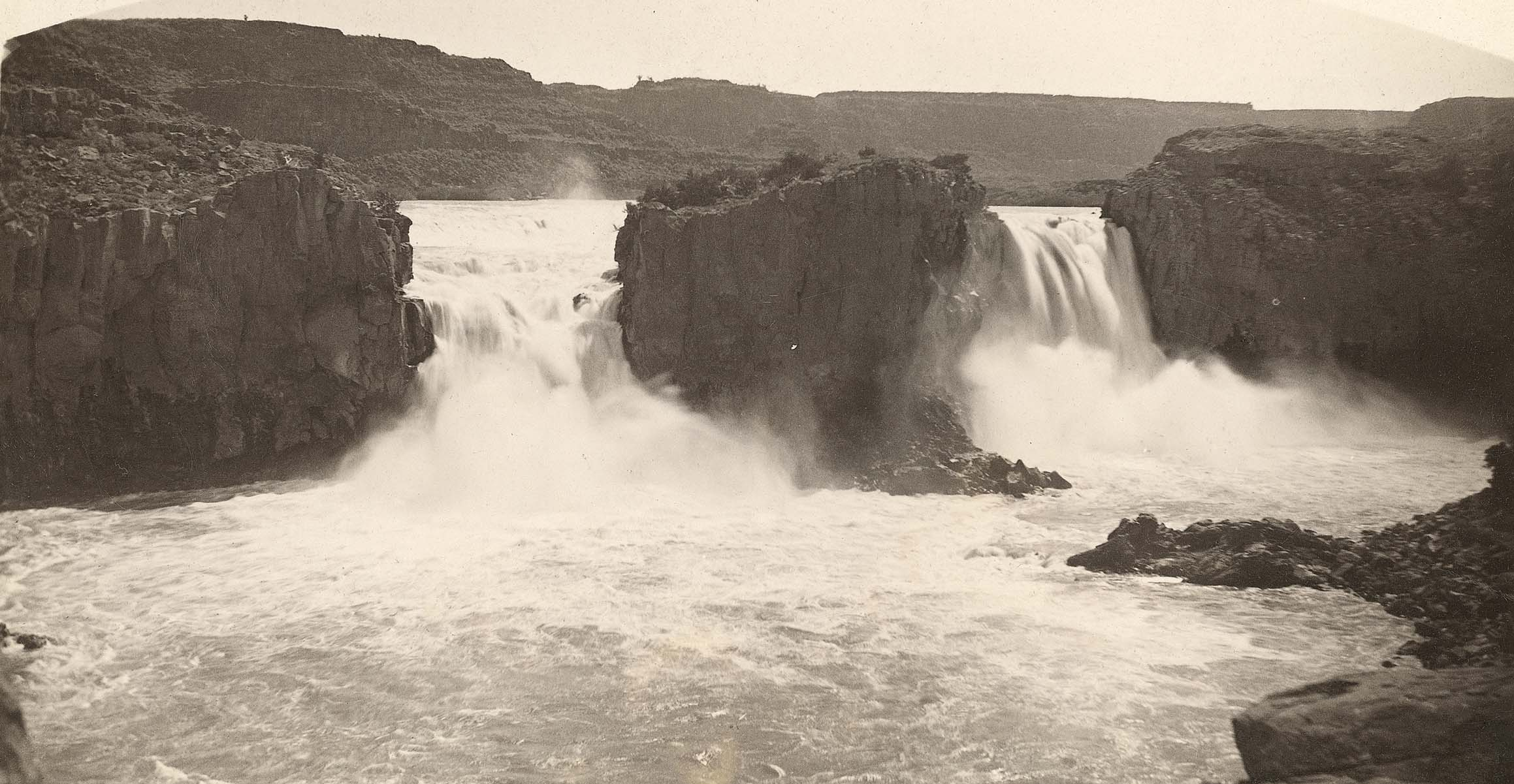
The cataracts of the Snake River forced early explorers and settlers to travel overland. This is Twin Falls, upstream of Shoshone Falls, as it appeared c. 1871.

In 1818 Donald Mackenzie and Alexander Ross established Fort Nez Percés for the North West Company near the confluence of the Snake and Columbia Rivers. The following year, Mackenzie traveled up the Snake River and reached Boise Valley by making the first recorded river ascent of Hells Canyon. Mackenzie's goal was to bypass the arduous trek over the Blue Mountains. He wrote that "the passage by water is now proved to be safe and practicable for loaded boats, without one single carrying place or portage; therefore, the doubtful question is set at rest forever. Yet from the force of the current and the frequency of rapids, it may still be advisable, and perhaps preferable, to continue the land transport."

Canadian fur trappers with the British Hudson's Bay Company (HBC) reached the Snake River watershed in 1819. As American fur trappers kept coming to the region, the HBC ordered the Canadians to kill as many beavers as they could, under the rationale that "if there are no beavers, there will be no reason for the Yanks to come," and even if the Americans did ultimately gain control, the HBC would already have taken all the profit. Focused primarily on the upper Snake River region, the "fur desert" policy was carried out in nine expeditions from about 1824–1831 and aimed to decrease the Americans' economic interest in the Oregon Country, the vast region of the Pacific Northwest centering on modern-day British Columbia, Washington, Oregon and Idaho. By the time the Americans annexed Oregon Territory in 1848, beaver were nearly extirpated across much of the Rocky Mountains.

Starting in the 1840s, the Oregon Trail became well established, and thousands of settlers passed through the Snake River Plain on their way to the Willamette Valley. Coming from Wyoming, the Oregon Trail reached the Snake River at Fort Hall, Idaho, and stayed south of the river until Three Island Crossing near modern-day Glenns Ferry. Here the trail diverged, with the northern route fording the river to reach the HBC trading post at Fort Boise while the southern route continued into what is now the eastern Oregon desert. While the northern route passed through more favorable country, the Snake River posed a formidable barrier; during high water, many travelers were forced to take the hot, dry southern route, or risk drowning. Travelers going via Fort Boise had to cross the river one more time to rejoin the trail heading west. A ferry existed at Fort Boise since at least 1843; the Three Island crossing was also replaced by a ferry in 1869. A new wave of travelers came in the 1860s with the Montana Trail providing access to gold strikes in Montana Territory. This crossed the Snake River by the Eagle Rock Ferry and later a bridge which the city of Idaho Falls would soon grow around.

=== Conquest and conflict ===
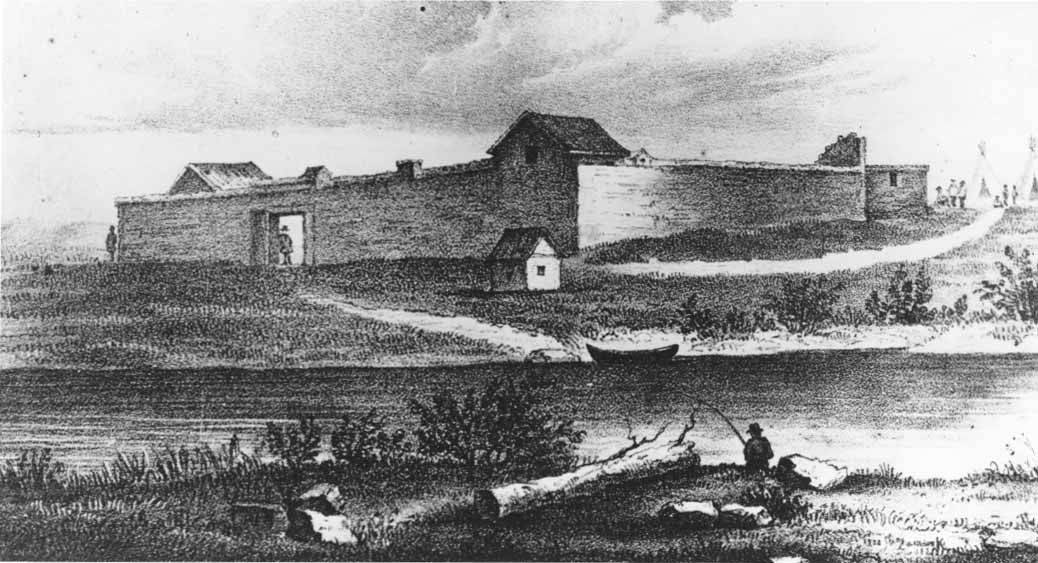
The first Fort Boise (illustration by Major Osborne Cross, c. 1849) was an key supply point on the Oregon Trail.

As the flow of settlers increased, the Nez Perce and their neighbors the Cayuse and Walla Walla came under pressure to cede portions of their territory. Tensions flared in 1855 after tribes were coerced into relinquishing huge amounts of territory in the Treaty of Walla Walla. In retaliation for Lt. Col. Edward Steptoe's defeat at the 1858 Battle of Pine Creek, a force led by Col. George Wright entered the lower Snake River country in 1859 and constructed Fort Taylor at the confluence of the Tucannon River below present-day Starbuck, Washington. Over several months Wright fought the natives along the river, killing their horses and destroying stored food. The sternwheeler Colonel Wright was commissioned to haul supplies up the Snake River to Fort Taylor. Captained by veteran Oregon river pilot Len White, the Wright was the first steamboat to run on the Snake River and the Columbia above The Dalles.

Two years later, Elias D. Pierce discovered gold to the east on Nez Perce treaty land. As thousands of fortune seekers flocked to the area, the city of Lewiston was founded in 1861, in violation of the 1855 treaty. The US government sided with the settlers, and pressured some Nez Perce leaders into signing a second treaty which shrank their reservation by 90 percent. Many Nez Perce including Chief Joseph's band refused to leave, calling the new treaty the "thief treaty". In March 1863, the Idaho Territory was split from Oregon, and Lewiston became its capital. More than 60,000 prospectors and others entered the Lewiston Valley by 1863. Many new steamboats were pressed into service, including the Spray, Cascadilla, Tenino, Okanogan, and Nez Perce Chief. The river's rapids posed a major navigation hazard, and from November to April the river was generally too low for ships. Despite these challenges, the water transport of freight and passengers was greatly profitable.

Up river, the Shoshone and other tribes were also becoming increasingly wary of settlers; in 1854 a Shoshone war party attacked a wagon train in the Boise Valley, and the U.S. Army mounted a counterattack, the Winnas Expedition. The situation became so unstable that Fort Boise was abandoned, and the Army had to escort wagon trains through the area. While early settlers had simply passed through this area on their way to Oregon, gold strikes brought renewed interest in the 1860s. The Army rebuilt Fort Boise further east of the original site in 1863. A military detachment was stationed there to quell any further violence; however, tensions continued to increase, and more wagon trains and mining parties were attacked. Starting in 1864, the Snake War was fought across much of southern Idaho, with numerous battles between the U.S. Army and the Shoshone, Bannock and Paiute. By 1868, exhausted after years of fighting, Chief Pocatello and many others surrendered and relocated to the Fort Hall Indian Reservation on the Snake River in southeast Idaho.

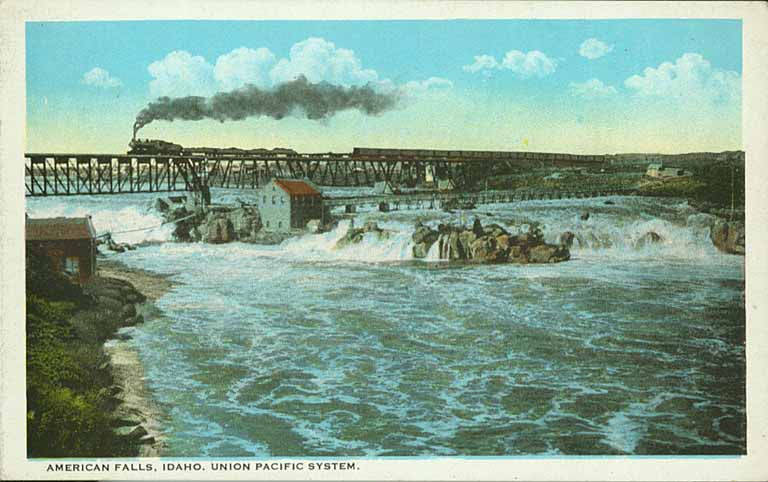
A train crosses the Snake River at American Falls, c. 1915. Railroads first reached the Snake River Plain in the 1880s.

Tribal resistance would continue for years to come. In 1877 the US government attempted to force the remaining Nez Perce onto their reservation, at which point Chief Joseph's band and several others opted to seek refuge elsewhere. After a treacherous crossing of the Snake at Dug Bar, Hells Canyon on May 31, the Nez Perce were pursued by the Army for over 1,000 miles (1,600 km) east, through Yellowstone before turning north through Montana, fighting several battles along the way. On October 5, 1877, Chief Joseph surrendered to US forces, thus ending the Nez Perce War. The survivors were distributed to various reservations across the western US. In 1878, an uprising occurred in response to overcrowding and food shortages at the Fort Hall Reservation, leading to the Bannock War. The US army defeated the Bannock and their Paiute allies and proceeded to restrict travel in and out of the reservation.

While Lewiston was now well connected by river, travel to Boise and other points upstream on the Snake River remained difficult due to the formidable obstacle of Hells Canyon. In 1865, Thomas Stump attempted to pilot the Colonel Wright up Hells Canyon, making it 80 miles (130 km) upriver before hitting rocks in a rapid, forcing their retreat. On the Snake River above Hells Canyon, several steamboats were built at great expense (as manufactured parts such as engines had to be hauled in overland), the first being the Shoshone in 1866. However, running the upper Snake proved unprofitable, due to lack of demand. The owners of Shoshone decided to move her to the lower Snake River, and in April 1870, they made the first successful river descent of Hells Canyon, a harrowing ride that skirted disaster several times. In 1895 the steamboat Norma, which had been built to haul copper ore on the Snake River above Hells Canyon, also made the run under similar circumstances.

In the 1870s, Boise (to which Idaho's capital was moved in 1866) expanded rapidly as growth slowed in Lewiston. Gold drew more than 25,000 prospectors to the Boise Valley, and a new city quickly grew around the U.S. Army post at Fort Boise. With Hells Canyon impractical for river navigation, interest grew in connecting the area by rail. By 1884, the Oregon Railroad & Navigation Company (later integrated into Union Pacific) had connected Portland, Oregon, to the Union Pacific line at Granger, Wyoming, via Huntington and Pocatello. Boise, initially bypassed due to a steep grade, was connected three years later. In addition to commerce, the railroad also opened the Snake River region – which just a few years ago had been seen as a remote, rough frontier – to recreation. The Union Pacific heavily promoted tourism in places like Shoshone Falls, Payette Lake and Soda Springs, Idaho. Countering the reputation of southern Idaho as a wasteland, a brochure described Shoshone Falls: "Shoshone differs from every other waterfall in this or the old country. It is its lonely grandeur that impresses one so deeply; all of the other historic places have the adjuncts of civilization, and one is almost overshadowed by a city while in their presence."

== Reclamation and development ==
=== Irrigation ===
Most travelers on the Oregon Trail regarded the arid Snake River Plain as an obstacle to be crossed, not a land to be settled. This began to change with the Boise gold strikes, where the demands of the mining industry and the difficulty of importing goods set off an agricultural boom in the Boise Valley. By the 1880s, settlers also came to the upper Snake River north of Idaho Falls, where fertile, sandy soils presented ideal conditions for the iconic russet potato ("Idaho potato"). The dry climate made irrigation necessary, and numerous private irrigation companies were formed. Private canal systems around Boise and Idaho Falls saw some success, but all the easily farmable land was soon developed, and they could not raise the capital for further expansion. In addition, low water by late summer posed a challenge to farmers, and the irrigation companies could not afford to build dams to provide water storage.

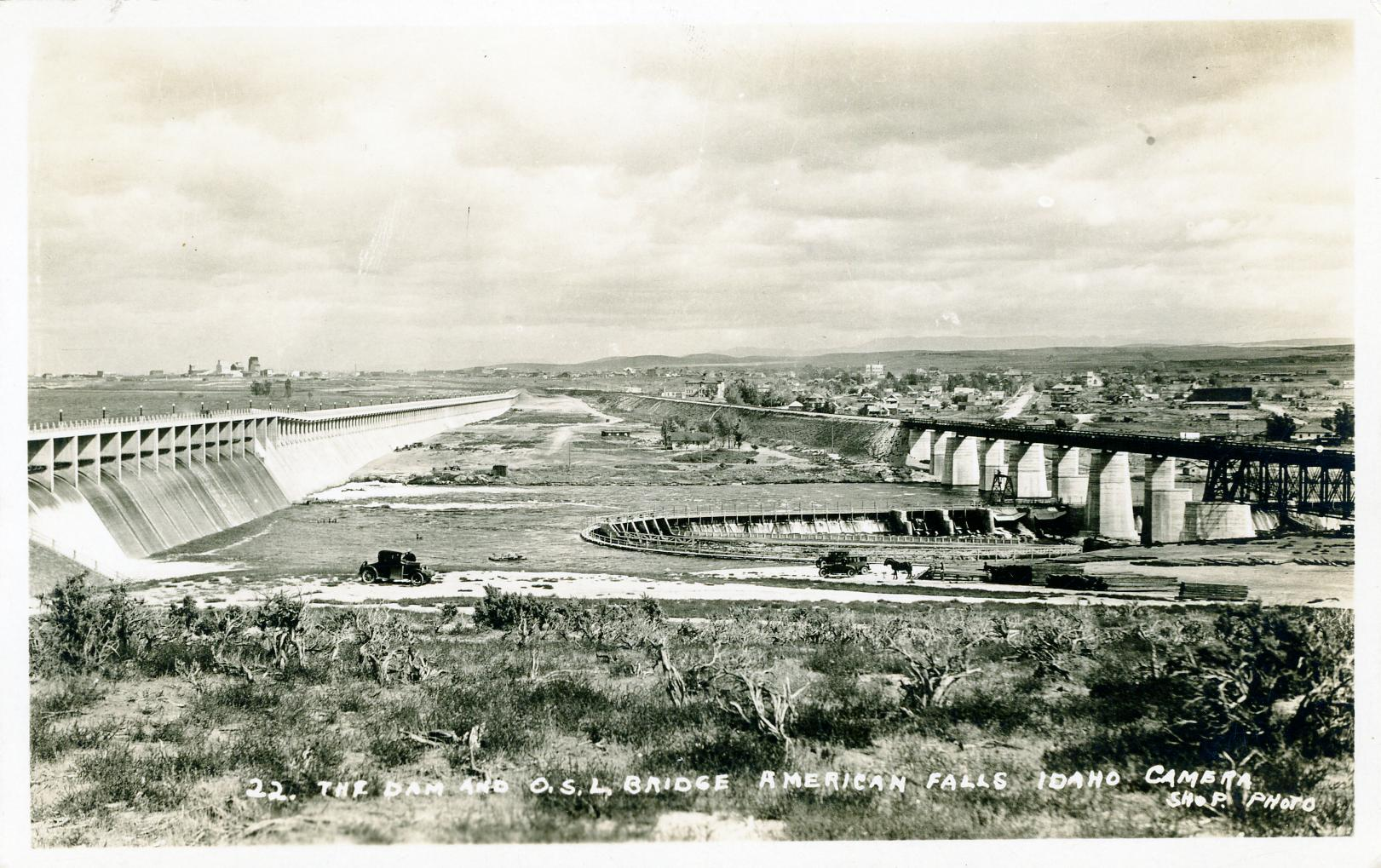
The first American Falls Dam (1927, rebuilt 1978) was constructed to store water for the federal Minidoka Project.

With many private irrigation companies verging on insolvency, the federal government began to explore programs assisting agricultural development. The 1894 Carey Act granted large tracts of dry federal land to western states, which then sold the land to farmers and solicited private investors to organize irrigation districts. Investors would then recoup their capital by selling water rights to farmers. Irrigation plans were reviewed by engineers, who determined the economic feasibility of the projects. Although the Carey Act saw little success in most states, it greatly benefited Idaho. Some 60 percent of all lands developed under the Carey Act were in Idaho, and almost all of that utilized Snake River water.

I. B. Perrine, who homesteaded near Shoshone Falls in the 1880s, went on to develop one of the most successful Carey Act projects. In 1900 Perrine filed a claim for water from the Snake River, and backed by significant private capital, oversaw the construction of Milner Dam and a canal system to irrigate some 250,000 acres (100,000 ha) of the Snake River Plain. Completed in 1905, the project was an immediate success. The rapid transformation of the barren landscape into productive farmland led to the moniker "Magic Valley", and led to massive growth of the city of Twin Falls. During certain times of the year, almost all the Snake River's flow was diverted at Milner Dam, and since then, Shoshone Falls has regularly run dry in the summer. The Idaho State Historical Society writes that "Perrine’s venture contrasted remarkably with private canal company failures that led to congressional provision for federal reclamation projects after 1902. As a rare successful example of state supervised private irrigation development provided for in [the Carey Act] of 1894, Milner Dam and its canal system have national significance in agricultural history."

With the creation of the Reclamation Service (now the Bureau of Reclamation) in 1902, the federal government began to play a more direct role in water resources development. The expansive Minidoka Project was the first federal reclamation project in Idaho. Starting with Minidoka Dam in 1906, the project would grow over the next few decades to include major reservoirs at Jackson Lake, American Falls and Island Park, and a large network of canals and pump stations. The Minidoka Project would eventually bring water to a million acres (2,500 km^{2}) of the Magic Valley. During World War II, many Japanese Americans interned at Minidoka were made to work on the project. The Boise Project, which would ultimately water 500,000 acres (200,000 ha) in and around the Boise Valley, was another major early reclamation undertaking. At its completion, Arrowrock Dam (1915) on the Boise River was the tallest dam in the world, and its construction process was an important prototype for future federal projects such as Hoover Dam.

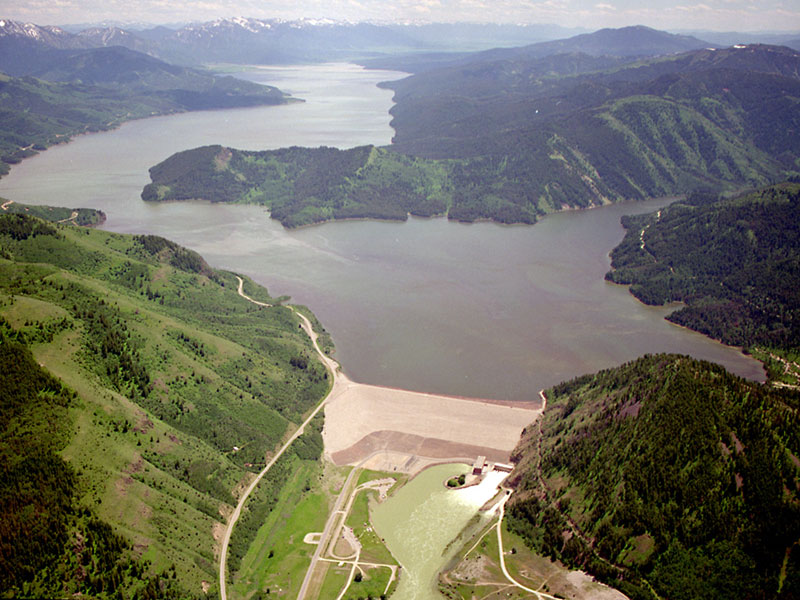
Palisades Dam (1956) provides irrigation and flood control for the Snake River upstream of Idaho Falls.

Starting around the 1950s, farmers made heavy use of the Snake River aquifer, bringing large new areas into production. Surface water development also increased with projects such as Cascade Dam (1948) and Anderson Ranch Dam (1950), which provided additional storage for the Boise Project. Palisades Dam was built in 1956, providing flood control and irrigation for the Snake River above Idaho Falls, an area which the Bureau of Reclamation had previously overlooked. Near Rexburg, the Teton Dam was also built to provide water for this area. In 1976, the Teton Dam failed catastrophically, killing eleven people and causing at least $400 million in damage along the Henrys Fork and Snake Rivers. The political fallout from this disaster marked the end of large new irrigation developments not only for the Snake River system, but for the Bureau of Reclamation as a whole.

Agriculture has significantly impacted water quality in the Snake River upstream of Hells Canyon. Water removed from the river for irrigation becomes contaminated with chemical fertilizers and manure, and percolates into the Snake River Aquifer. Pollutants collect in the groundwater and eventually enter the river via spring flows. Excess nitrogen, phosphorus and bacterial loads occur in many locations across southern Idaho. Large algae blooms are a recurring issue in summer. The U.S. Environmental Protection Agency has established water quality guidelines for Snake River flows entering Hells Canyon, which cover bacteria, mercury, excess nutrients, pesticides, sediments and water temperature. Implementation of the guidelines include best management practices for agriculture and forestry, and regular water quality monitoring.

=== Hydroelectricity ===
Power development of the Snake River began in the early 20th century as cities, farms, mines and industry grew around the river. The first small hydroelectric plant on the Snake River, Swan Falls Dam, was built in 1901, followed by one at American Falls in 1902. Many other projects followed, particularly around Shoshone Falls where the natural drop of the river offered great energy potential. After developing the Milner Dam irrigation scheme, I. B. Perrine built a hydroelectric plant at Shoshone Falls in 1907. Small private utilities built power plants at Salmon Falls (1910) and Thousand Springs (1912). Idaho Power was incorporated in 1915, and acquired all the aforementioned plants the following year. It proceeded to build a second, larger plant at Shoshone Falls in 1921, and another plant at Twin Falls in 1935. The advent of electric pumps opened up large new areas to agriculture, which had previously been limited to land where water could flow by gravity. The Minidoka Project, which included the Bureau of Reclamation's first hydroelectric plant in Idaho, was an early adopter of this system. The project generated more power than it needed, and surplus was sold to nearby towns such as Burley and Rupert, which created their own municipal electric systems.

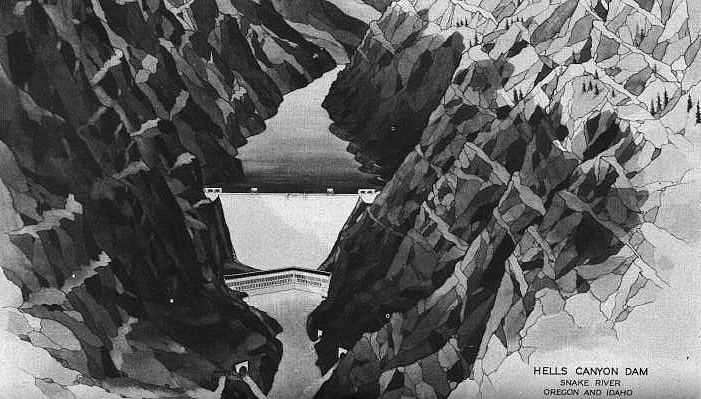
Rendering of the Army Corps' proposed high dam in Hells Canyon

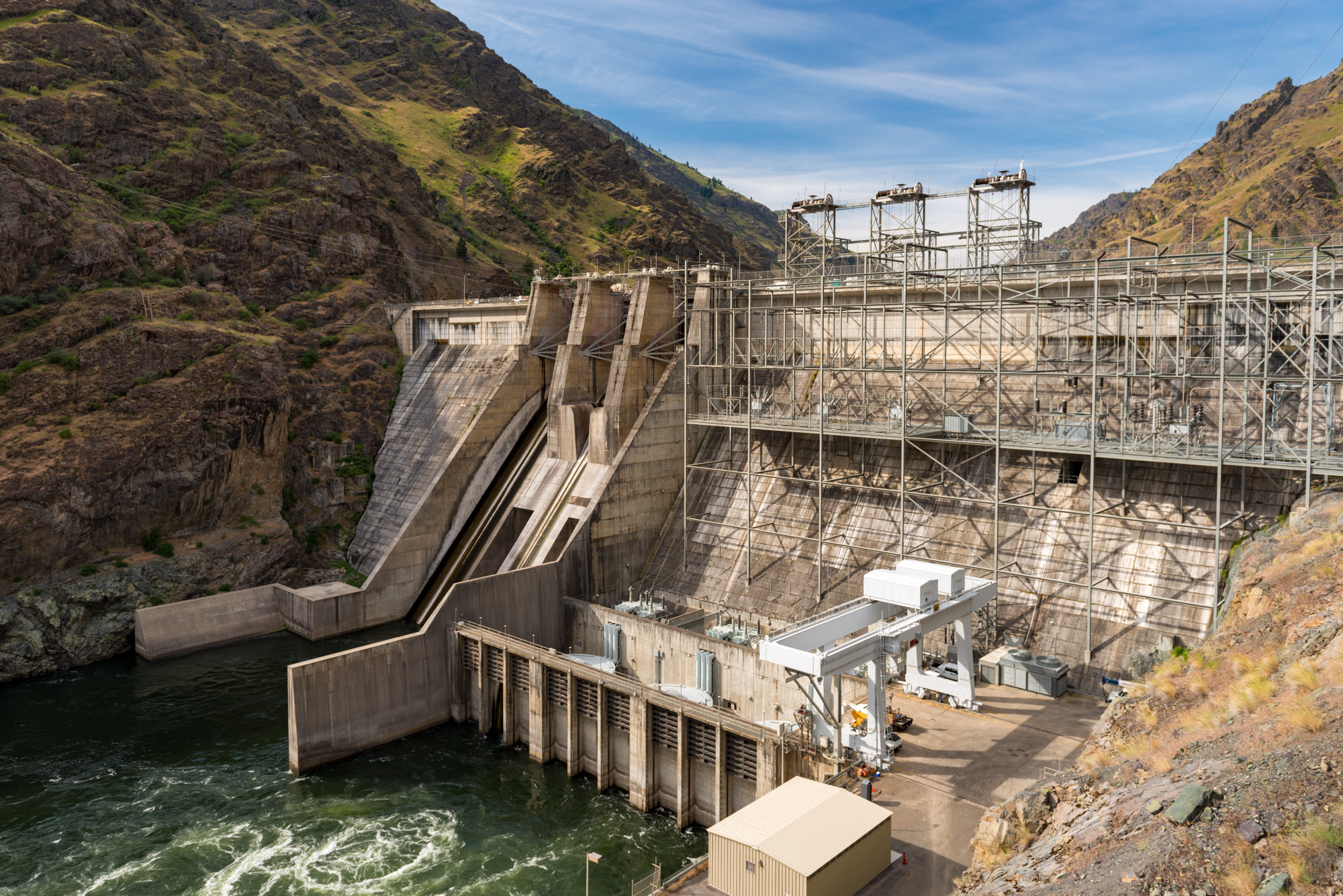
Hells Canyon Dam is the lowermost of three dams in Idaho Power's Hells Canyon hydroelectric complex.

By the 1940s, following the construction of massive hydropower dams on the Columbia River such as Grand Coulee, interest turned to the considerable untapped power potential of the Snake River in Hells Canyon. In 1947, Idaho Power set its sights on the upper section of the canyon, where it proposed a series of three medium-sized dams. Two years later, the U.S. Army Corps of Engineers (Army Corps) proposed a single massive dam, over 700 feet (210 m) high, to be built in lower Hells Canyon. In 1955 the Federal Power Commission authorized the Idaho Power project, but initially only one of the three dams, Brownlee (completed 1958), was built. The other dams, located downstream, would have been in the flood zone of not only the Army Corps' high dam, but two other competing proposals.

The Pacific Northwest Power Company, a consortium of four private utilities, proposed the "High Mountain Sheep Dam" on the Snake River just upstream of the Salmon River. The even bigger "Nez Perce Dam", proposed by the Washington Public Power Supply System, would be located downstream of the Salmon River. While that location offered greater power potential, the fishery supported by the Salmon River was considered too economically valuable to wipe out, and in 1964 the Commission chose to authorize the High Mountain Sheep project. By then, significant public opposition had formed against the high dam, as it would still block salmon migration to the upper Snake, and adversely affect wildlife and recreational values in Hells Canyon. It was also challenged by Washington Public Power, which argued that the commission should give priority to public utilities over private ones.

The case reached the Supreme Court, which in the landmark 1967 ruling of Udall v. Federal Power Commission issued an injunction temporarily halting the project. Justice William O. Douglas wrote that in licensing projects, the Commission must consider "future power demand and supply, alternate sources of power, the public interest in preserving reaches of wild rivers and wilderness areas, the preservation of anadromous fish for commercial and recreational purposes, and the protection of wildlife." This was the first time the court cited environmental protection as a consideration for whether to approve a dam project. In 1975, President Gerald R. Ford signed the Hells Canyon Wilderness into law, ending the high dam project for good.

Meanwhile, Idaho Power moved forward with the Oxbow and Hells Canyon Dams, though the question of fish passage still remained. From 1956 to 1964, returning adult salmon had been trapped at the base of Brownlee Dam (whose height made a fish ladder impractical) and released upstream. Downstream passage of juvenile salmon posed a much bigger problem; many were killed passing through the hydroelectric turbines, and efforts to trap and release them downstream met with failure. In 1960, Idaho Power proposed abandoning fish passage altogether and compensating for the loss by building fish hatcheries. By 1966 it reached an agreement with the Federal Power Commission to move forward with the hatchery plan, and by 1967 both Oxbow and Hells Canyon dams had been completed, neither with provision for fish passage. Idaho Power was tasked with building and operating the Oxbow, Rapid River, Niagara Springs and Pahsimeroi fish hatcheries at its own expense.

As of 2007, the Hells Canyon Hydroelectric Complex was responsible for 40 percent of Idaho Power's total power generation. The three dams have a capacity of 1,167 megawatts combined and produce about 6,053 gigawatt hours per year. Idaho Power's hatcheries produce almost seven million salmon and steelhead smolt to release in the Snake River system each year. Since the completion of the Hells Canyon complex, with the exception of the lower Snake River dams, only one major hydroelectric dam has been built in the Snake River system – the Army Corps' Dworshak Dam (1973), in the Clearwater River basin. Like the Hells Canyon dams, Dworshak also generated controversy over its impact on fisheries, and also made no provision for fish passage; rather, a hatchery was built at the base of the dam.

=== Navigation ===
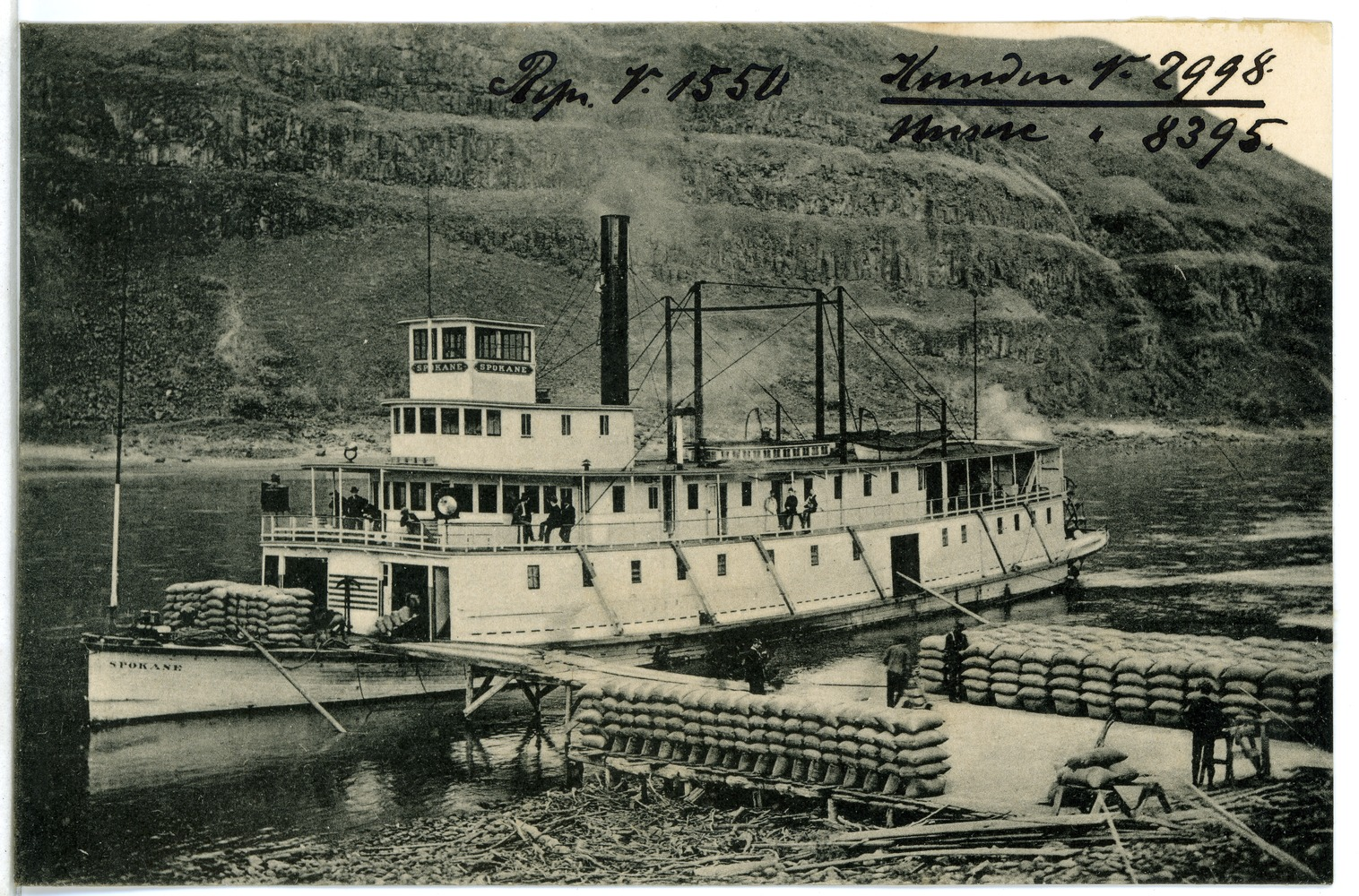
Bags of grain are loaded on the sternwheeler Spokane at Lewiston, c. 1906.

As gold mining declined in the late 19th century, the wheat industry boomed in the Palouse of southeast Washington. By the 1870s, the Oregon Steam Navigation Company was operating seven steamboats transporting grain from the Snake River to lower Columbia River ports. These were the Harvest Queen, John Gates, Spokane, Annie Faxon, Mountain Queen, R.R. Thompson, and Wide West. In the 1890s, a huge copper deposit was discovered at Eureka Bar in Hells Canyon. Several ships transported ore from there to Lewiston, including Imnaha, Mountain Gem, and Norma. In 1893 the Annie Faxon suffered a boiler explosion and sank on the Snake below Lewiston, killing five people. Starting in the 1880s, the Army Corps began dredging the Snake River below Lewiston to maintain a 5-foot (1.5 m) deep navigation channel.

River traffic declined rapidly once railroads arrived. By 1899, the Union Pacific line along the south bank of the Snake River had reached Riparia, Washington. It then joined forces with the Northern Pacific Railroad, which was building a line along the north bank, to build the shared Camas Prairie Railroad the rest of the way to Lewiston, which it reached in 1908. The Open River Transportation Company, which operated steamboats between Lewiston and Celilo Falls on the Columbia, went bankrupt in 1912. The 1915 completion of the Celilo Canal made it much easier for boats from the upper Columbia and Snake to reach Portland, and the Columbia River Transportation Company began operating a water route between Lewiston and Portland. Still, steamboats were unable to compete with railroads on speed and efficiency. The last steamboat on the lower Snake ran in 1920.

Once the railroads monopolized grain shipments, they raised shipping rates, to farmers' consternation. In 1934, political activist Herbert G. West organized the Inland Empire Waterways Association (IEWA), to promote an "open river" – a deep-water shipping channel on the Snake and Columbia Rivers that could compete with rail. The IEWA initially pushed for improvements such as bigger locks at Bonneville Dam in 1938 and the construction of McNary Dam on the Columbia, which would improve navigation to the mouth of the Snake. In 1941 a bill was first introduced in Congress authorizing the Army Corps to develop the lower Snake River. The 1941 bill failed, but after several years of debate, Congress finally authorized the Snake River development in 1945. Early plans included anywhere from six to ten low dams for the lower Snake. Eventually this was reduced to four bigger dams, which would lower costs, but would require what at the time were the tallest navigation locks in the world, at over 100 feet (30 m).

Tribes, state wildlife agencies and the fishing industry opposed the dams, arguing that they would kill too many salmon. In 1947, the U.S. Department of the Interior proposed a ten-year moratorium on dam construction while the fishery problem was studied. With the onset of the Cold War, rising electricity demand in the Pacific Northwest – particularly at the nearby Hanford nuclear site – turned the project's focus towards hydropower. By 1948, the Army Corps estimated that over 80 percent of the economic benefits would come from power, and only 15 percent from navigation. Dam opponents countered that if the primary objective was now power, other dam sites existed in the Northwest that would have less impact on fish. These objections proved futile, as the lower Snake River dams were already authorized, and the federal government had little interest in studying alternatives. While opponents continued to stall the project for a few more years, Washington Senator Warren G. Magnuson pushed through a budget amendment in 1955 to start construction on the first dam, Ice Harbor.

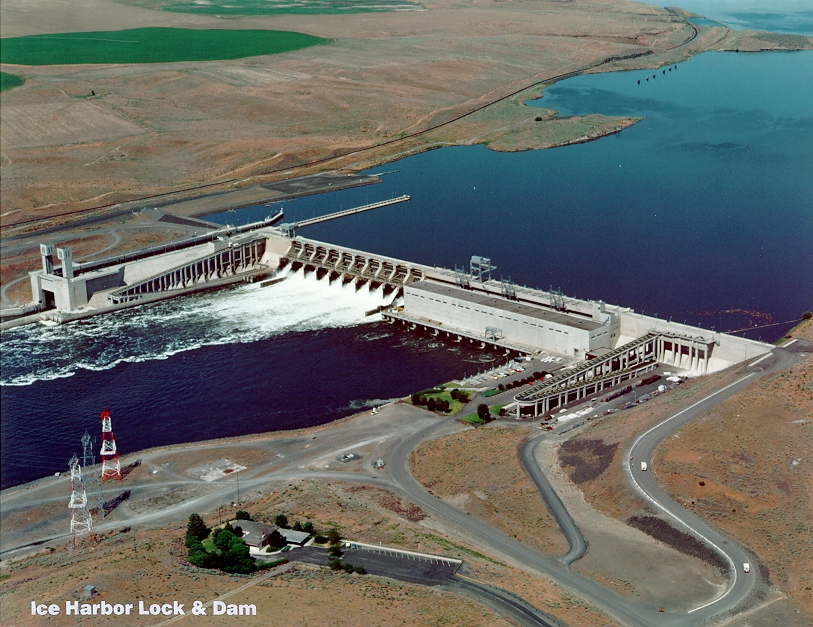
Ice Harbor Dam (1962) was the first of four Army Corps dams constructed along the lower Snake River, and the final dam on the river before it joins the Columbia.

Once construction began in 1956, Congress quickly approved more money to finish the project. Ice Harbor Dam was completed in 1962, and Lower Monumental and Little Goose Dams were completed in 1969 and 1970. The Lower Monumental project generated controversy as it threatened to flood the Marmes Rockshelter archeological site. Although the Army Corps agreed to build a dike around the site, it began to leak as the reservoir filled and the site was inundated. By the 1970s, the environmental movement in the US had become significantly larger, and groups such as the Association of Northwest Steelheaders lobbied to stop the construction of the fourth dam, Lower Granite. These efforts were unsuccessful, and the dam was completed in 1975. The first upriver barge reached Lewiston on April 10 of that year. The Army Corps had planned one more dam at Asotin, which would have extended navigation to mines upstream of Lewiston. Faced with public opposition, Congress deauthorized the project in 1975.

Once the dams were completed, barges up to 12,000 tonnes and drawing 14 feet (4.3 m) of water were able to reach Lewiston. Today, multiple barge terminals operate along the lower Snake, including Lewiston, Clarkston, Wilma, Central Ferry and Almota. Grain accounts for the majority of barge traffic on the river; other shipments include forestry products, fuel, chemicals and fertilizers. In 2020, a total of 4.2 million short tons (3,800,000 t) of cargo were barged on the Snake River. Since 2000, the tonnage of commercial shipping on the Snake River has declined, due mostly to the loss of petroleum products after a pipeline was constructed. After the general decline of the Great Recession, other sectors have been slow to recover. As of 2015, grain tonnage had fallen about a third from 2000 levels, while forestry products had fallen by nearly three-quarters, with many shipments switching back to rail. Container shipping at the Port of Lewiston ceased in 2015, due to its primary source, the Port of Portland, no longer receiving containers. From 2015 to 2023, grain exports from the Port of Lewiston have remained relatively steady while breakbulk cargo has increased.

As dam opponents had feared, Snake River salmon returns declined greatly after the dams were built. Since 2000, there have been renewed calls for removing the lower Snake River dams, which have become a significant political issue for the Pacific Northwest.

== Ecology and environmental issues ==
=== Aquatic habitats ===
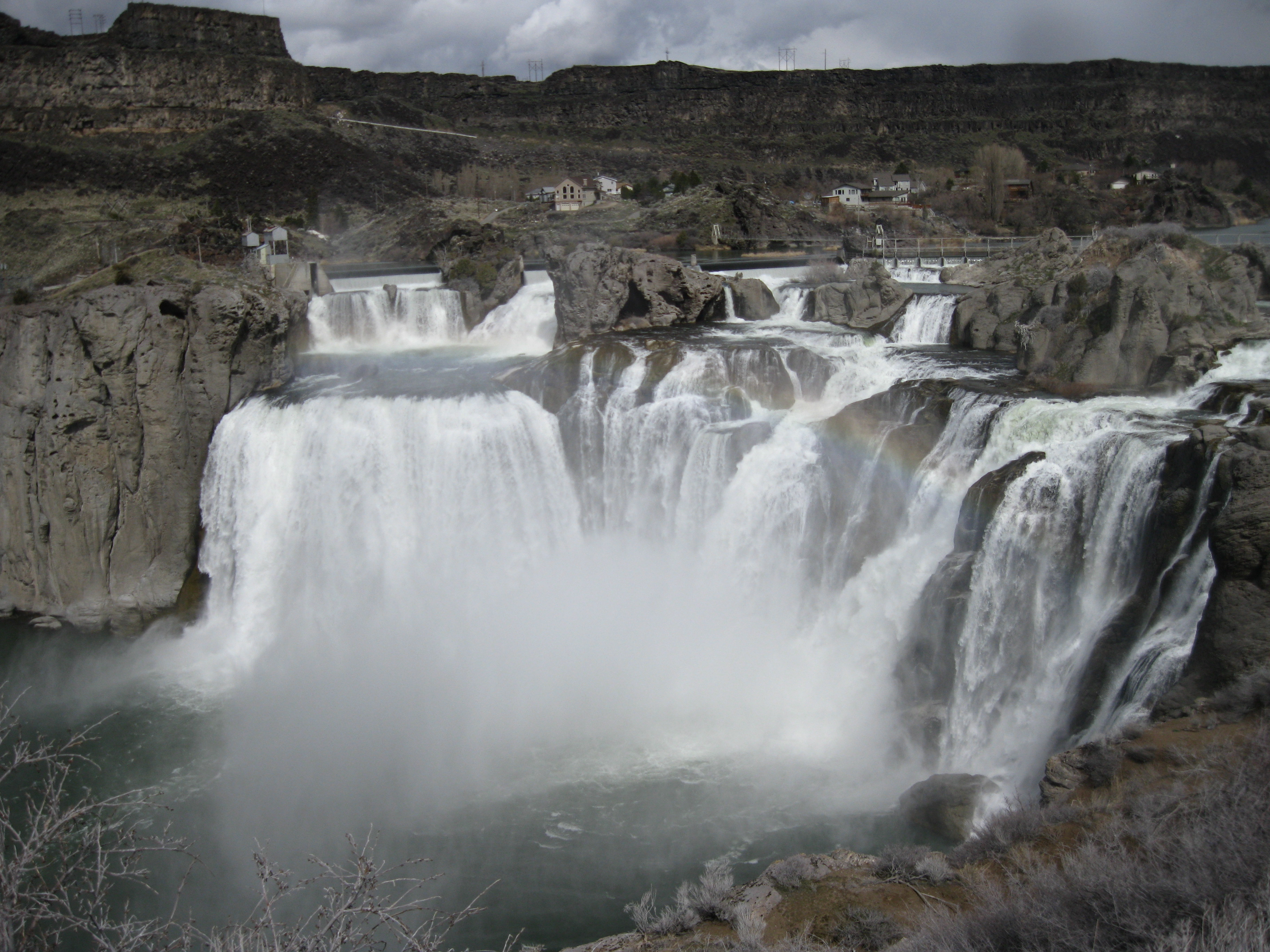
Shoshone Falls forms a complete barrier to upstream movement of fish in the Snake River, and was the historical upper limit of Snake River salmon and steelhead.

The World Wide Fund for Nature (WWF) divides the Snake River into two freshwater ecoregions – the Upper Snake and Columbia Unglaciated – with Shoshone Falls marking the boundary between the two. Shoshone Falls has presented a total barrier to the upstream movement of fish at least since the Bonneville flood 15,000 years ago. The Big Wood River (the main tributary of the Malad River) is also included in the Upper Snake ecoregion, due to the presence of a separate natural waterfall barrier. As a result, only 35 percent of the fish fauna above Shoshone falls, and 40 percent of the Big Wood River's fish fauna, are shared with the lower Snake River.

Compared to the lower Snake River and the rest of the Columbia River system, the Upper Snake ecoregion has a high level of endemism, especially among freshwater molluscs such as snails and clams. At least 21 snail and clam species are of special concern, including 15 that appear to exist only in single clusters. There are 14 fish species found in the Upper Snake region that do not occur elsewhere in the Columbia's watershed, but which do occur in some western Utah watersheds and the Yellowstone River. These include healthy populations of Yellowstone cutthroat trout and Snake River fine-spotted cutthroat trout. The Wood River sculpin is endemic to the Wood River. The Shoshone sculpin is endemic to the small portion of the Snake River between Shoshone Falls and the Wood River.

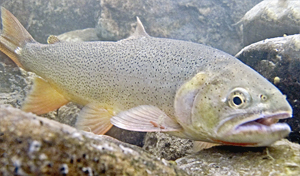
Snake river fine spotted cutthroat trout

The Snake River below Shoshone Falls is home to about 35 native fish species, of which 12 are also found in the Columbia River and four of which are endemic to the Snake or nearby watersheds: the sand roller, shorthead sculpin, margined sculpin and the Oregon chub, which also occurs in a few other Oregon streams. Bull trout migrate from the main stem of the Snake to spawn in several tributary basins, including the Bruneau, Imnaha and Grande Ronde Rivers. Large white sturgeon, introduced to the Snake River in the 19th century, were once widespread in the Snake River below Shoshone Falls; due to dam construction, only a few fragmented populations remain. The Idaho Department of Fish and Game has occasionally recorded sturgeon more than 10 feet (3.0 m) long in Hells Canyon. Other common introduced species include whitefish, pikeminnow, smallmouth bass, and rainbow, brown, brook and lake trout.

==== Anadromous fish ====
Anadromous salmonids (Oncorhynchus), including chinook, coho, and sockeye salmon, and redband and steelhead trout, were historically the most abundant fish and a keystone species of the Snake River system. Benke and Cushing's Rivers of North America describes the Snake as a "wild salmon factory;" prior to the 19th century, between two and six million adult salmon and steelhead returned each year from the Pacific to spawn in the Snake River watershed. Salmon die after spawning, and their carcasses represent a crucial influx of organic matter to mountain rivers that have few natural nutrient sources. Tributaries below Hells Canyon, particularly the Salmon River, held the richest spawning grounds, although substantial numbers also made it above Hells Canyon as far as Shoshone Falls. The Snake River produced about 40 percent of all chinook salmon and 50 percent of all steelhead in the Columbia River watershed.

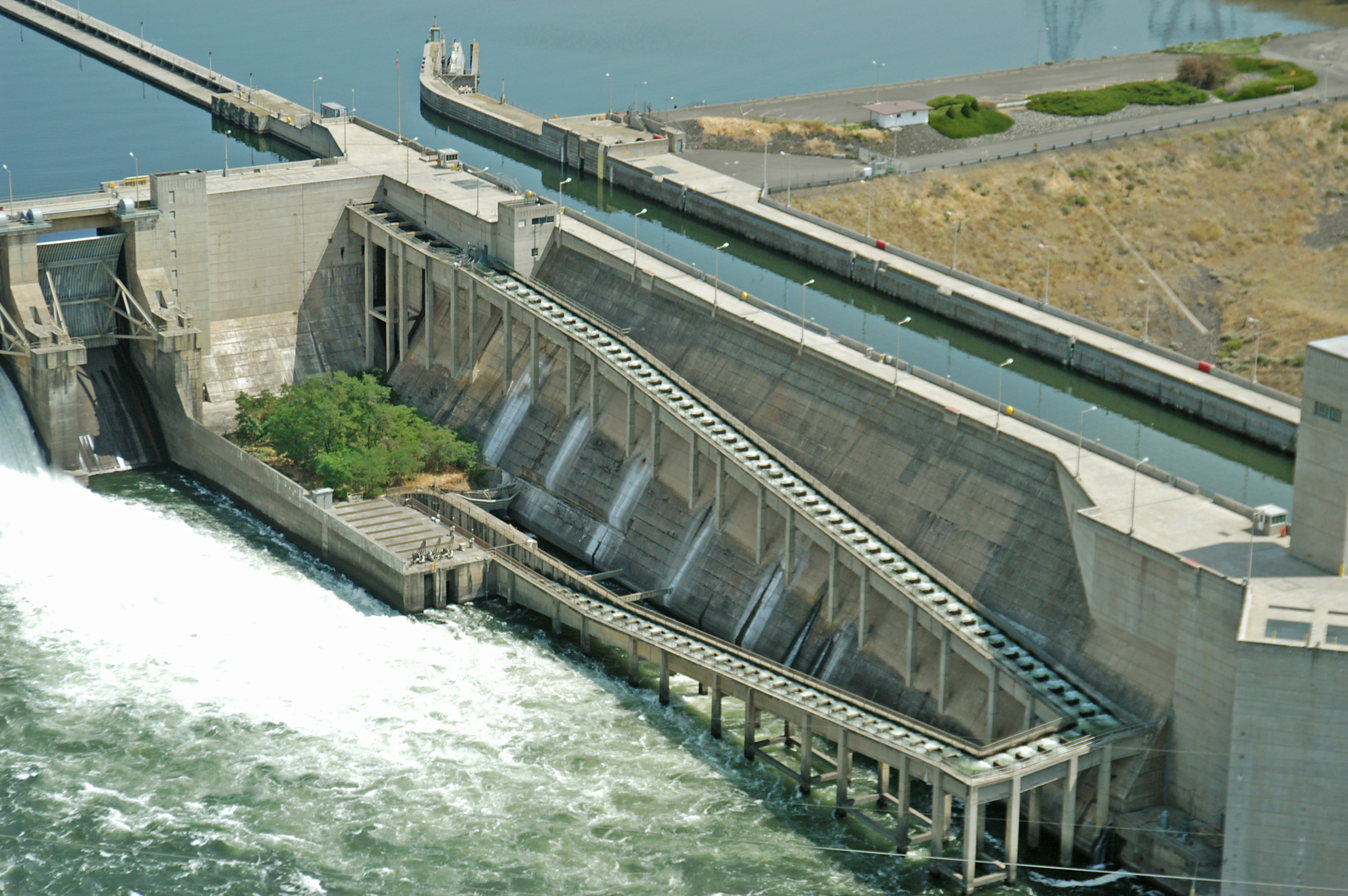
Adult salmon and steelhead returning to the Snake River must surmount fish ladders at several dams, including this one at Lower Monumental Dam.

Populations of anadromous fish began to decline in the late 1800s due to the impact of commercial fishing, logging, mining and agriculture, but even in the 1930s, returning fall chinook alone numbered 500,000. Populations further collapsed once dams were built on the lower Snake and Columbia Rivers, and Hells Canyon Dam blocked access to the upper Snake. Wild Snake River spring and summer chinook returns declined from 130,000 in the 1950s to less than 5,000 in the 1990s. Wild steelhead returns followed a similar pattern, falling from 110,000 in the 1960s to less than 10,000 in the 1990s. Spring, summer and fall-run chinook were all listed as threatened in 1992. Snake River steelhead were also listed as threatened in 1997.

Wild chinook salmon and steelhead continued to decline into the 1990s, but have begun an unsteady recovery since 2000, with both chinook and steelhead returns up to 20,000–30,000 in some years. Coho salmon had disappeared from the Snake River by the 1980s, they were reintroduced to the watershed in 1995.

Snake River sockeye once numbered to up 150,000 adults. Between 24,000 and 30,000 sockeye returned to Wallowa Lake in the Grande Ronde River watershed, but the run was eliminated by 1905 due to overharvest and unscreened irrigation diversions. The Payette Lake population once numbering up to 100,000 was blocked by the Black Canyon Dam in 1924. Sockeye in the Yellowbelly, Stanley, and Pettit Lakes of the Sawtooth basin were eradicated by management actions of the Idaho Department of Fish and Game in the 1950s, and irrigation diversions lead to the extirpation of the Pettit Lake population. Snake River sockeye returns declined to 4,500 in the 1950s and only a few dozen by the late 1960s. Snake River sockeye were listed as endangered in 1991.

Numerous hatcheries are operated by agencies such as the Army Corps, Idaho Power, the Bonneville Power Administration, the U.S. Bureau of Indian Affairs and the U.S. Fish and Wildlife Service, to supplement wild fish populations. Hatcheries release about 33 million salmon and steelhead smolt into the Snake River watershed each year. However, the survival rate for hatchery fish is poor. Just 0.4 percent of hatchery chinook and 1.5 percent of hatchery steelhead returned as adults, as measured at Lower Granite Dam between 2007 and 2016.

Upstream of the four lower dams, the Snake River watershed contains some of the best remaining spawning habitat in the Columbia River system, particularly along the Clearwater and Salmon Rivers; the latter is one of the longest undammed rivers in the continental US. A much depleted sockeye salmon run continues to spawn in Redfish Lake near Stanley, Idaho, more than 900 miles (1,400 km) inland from the Pacific Ocean. This represents the southernmost, highest elevation and longest sockeye run in the world.

=== Terrestrial and wetland habitats ===
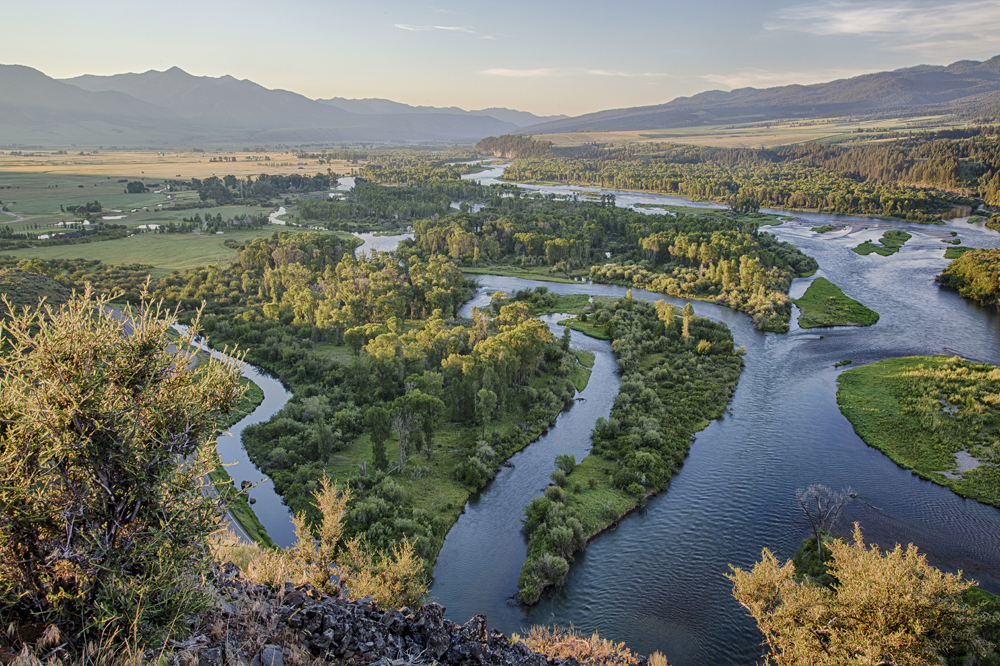
Riparian forest and floodplain habitat lines the Snake River in Swan Valley, east of Rexburg, Idaho.

The Snake River provides important wildlife habitat along much of its course, particularly in the arid Snake River Plain where it is the only source of water for many miles. The upper reaches of the Snake River, including in Jackson Hole and the floodplain north of Idaho Falls where it joins the Henrys Fork, have extensive riparian gallery forests dominated by black cottonwood and narrowleaf cottonwood. The Northwest Power and Conservation Council describes these as "some of the most important cottonwood gallery forests in the Intermountain West". Seasonal floods scour and change the shoreline, clearing areas of older trees and making way for new growth. Ute lady's tresses, a rare orchid, are found in riparian wetlands along with willows, rushes, sedges and horsetails.

The Fort Hall Bottoms in the southern Snake River Plain are an important wetland along the river, and create a major wintering and nesting site for waterfowl, shorebirds and raptors, including bald eagles and trumpeter swans. Part of these wetlands were flooded with the construction of American Falls Dam, and large portions of the remainder have been degraded by cattle grazing. Ponds and wetlands in the Hagerman Valley, near the Hagerman Fossil Beds National Monument, are also heavily used by both migratory and resident birds. On the Snake River south of Boise is the nearly 500,000-acre (200,000 ha) Morley Nelson Snake River Birds of Prey National Conservation Area, which hosts the densest concentration of nesting raptors in the US.

The Snake River headwaters are part of the Greater Yellowstone Ecosystem, which the National Park Service describes as "one of the largest nearly intact temperate-zone ecosystems on Earth." The region is home to some of the largest wild elk and bison populations in the US, and provides habitat for grizzly bear, wolverine and lynx. The other major wild area in the Snake River watershed centers on Idaho's extremely rugged Frank Church–River of No Return Wilderness, the largest federally designated wilderness in the contiguous US. Although the Snake River watershed remains lightly populated, most of its landscape has seen significant human impact since the 19th century. Heavy logging has historically occurred in the Boise area and on the Clearwater River, which hosted the last whitewater log drive in the US in 1971. Logging is still a major industry in the region, though since the 1990s, logging south of the Clearwater has decreased. Large areas of native sagebrush-steppe ecosystems, mostly in the Snake River Plain and Palouse, have been developed for agriculture. About two-thirds of the Snake River Plain remains grassland or shrubland; however, much of this acreage is impacted by livestock grazing, and fire regimes have become more severe with the proliferation of invasive species like cheatgrass.

=== Proposed dam removal ===
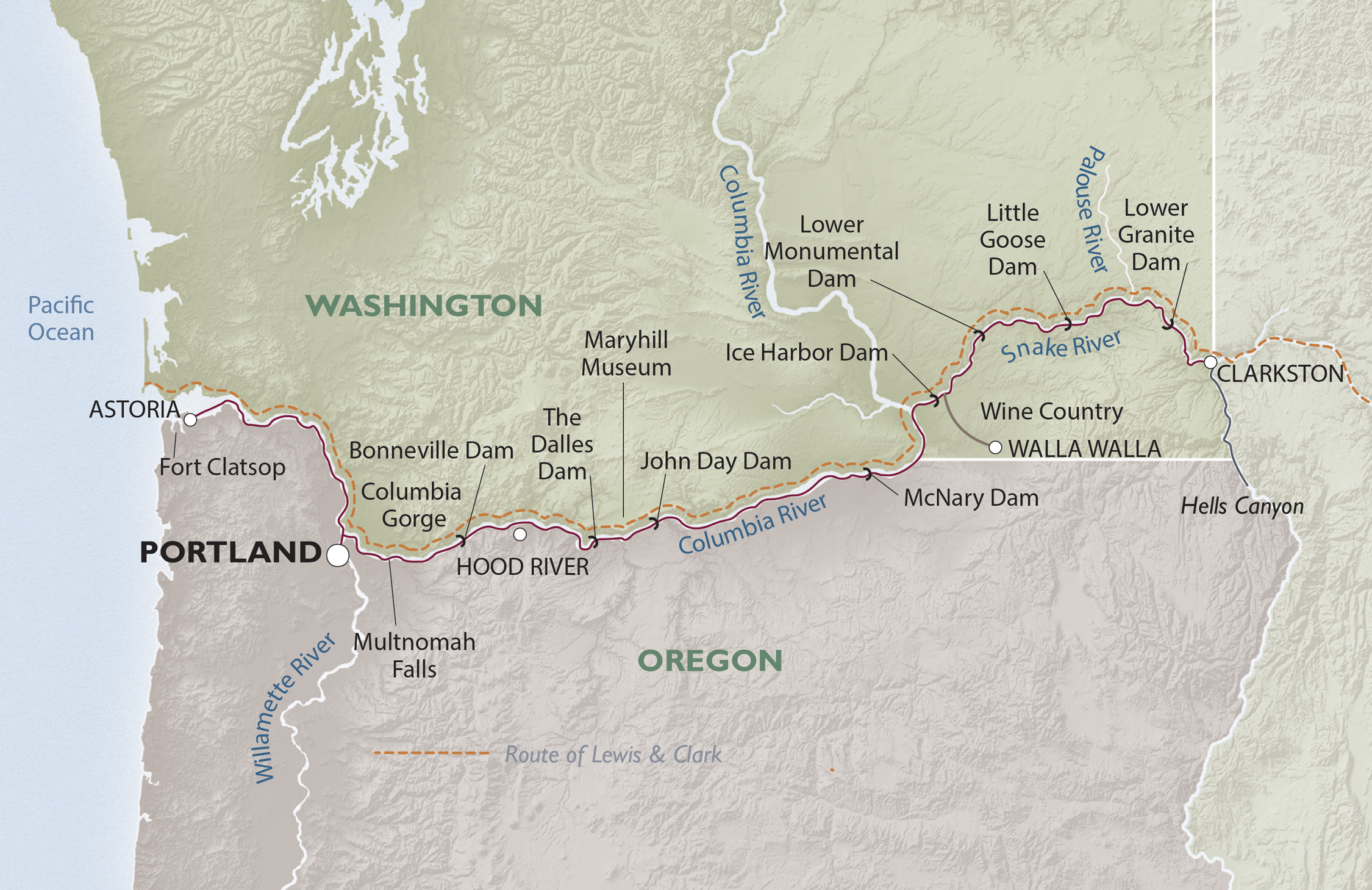
Map showing locations of dams on the lower Snake and Columbia rivers

The lower Snake River dams have remained controversial since their construction, and in the 21st century there has been increased debate over potentially removing the dams. Although the dams were built with fish ladders, the warm, slow-moving water in reservoirs disoriented migrating fish, and juvenile fish experienced significant mortality passing through the dams. In 1980 Congress passed the Northwest Power Act, which requires federal agencies in the Northwest to mitigate the impact of their dams on fish and wildlife. While installation of fish screens and bypasses have improved survival rates for juvenile fish, efforts to capture fish and transport them around the dams have seen little success. Although wild salmonid returns have seen a positive trend since their nadir in the 1990s, they remain well below pre-dam levels.

Supporters of dam removal, which include tribal organizations such as the Columbia River Inter-Tribal Fish Commission and environmental advocacy groups such as the Natural Resources Defense Council and the Sierra Club, argue that the most economical way to restore the fishery is to remove the dams, rather than continuing recovery efforts at great expense. As of 2023, over $17 billion had been spent on Snake River salmon recovery and hatchery operations. There are other economic arguments for dam removal, particularly that the annual cost of maintaining the barge channel exceeds the economic benefits provided by shipping, and the freight can be moved by rail instead. Furthermore, the dams only account for a small percentage of the total hydropower in the Northwest. A University of Idaho analysis estimated that over a 20-year period, removing the dams would be less expensive than the cost of continuing fish recovery efforts with the dams in place. Representative Mike Simpson (R-ID) has been a major supporter of dam removal, and in 2021 put forth an ambitious proposal to remove the dams, though Simpson's plan has come under scrutiny as among other actions, it would also impose "a 35-year moratorium on litigation related to anadromous fish" at federal Columbia River Basin dams.

Opponents of dam removal include farmers, local governments such as the city of Lewiston, congressional representatives in eastern Washington and the Bonneville Power Administration, which manages federal hydroelectric dams in the Northwest. In the context of shipping, while river traffic has declined in recent years, it remains important to the area's economy, and moving cargo by barge is cheaper and twice as fuel-efficient as diesel trains. While the dams do not generate much baseload power, they are crucial to managing peak demand on a daily basis, as hydropower can be ramped up and down quickly. As more wind and solar energy is added to the Northwest grid, more load balancing will be needed to compensate for the intermittent nature of those sources. Although Washington governor Jay Inslee and Washington Senator Patty Murray have tentatively endorsed dam removal, they stressed that hydropower must be replaced by other renewable sources, and economic impacts such as the loss of the ship channel should be "mitigated or replaced."

In December 2023, the Biden administration expressed its support for the Columbia Basin Restoration Initiative, which would develop a strategy to replace the power and navigation benefits provided by the Snake River dams, and explore options for post-dam river restoration. The initiative is an agreement between the federal government, four tribal nations, the states of Washington and Oregon, and several conservation groups. It would not authorize the removal of the dams, which would require a separate act of Congress.

== See also ==
- List of crossings of the Snake River
- List of tributaries of the Columbia River
- List of rivers of Idaho
- List of rivers of Oregon
- List of rivers of Washington (state)
- List of rivers of Wyoming
- List of longest rivers of the United States (by main stem)
- List of longest streams of Idaho
- List of longest streams of Oregon
