= Buffalo Fork (Wyoming) =

Physical characteristics
- Source
  - location: Buffalo Plateau
  - coordinates: 43°57′08″N 109°51′27″W
  - elevation: 10,600 ft (3,200 m)
- Mouth
  - location: Confluence with Snake River
  - coordinates: 43°50′20″N 110°30′53″W
  - elevation: 6,710 ft (2,050 m)
- Basin size: 323 mi^{2} (840 km^{2})
- Discharge
  - average: 492 cu ft/s (13.9 m^{3}/s)

The Buffalo Fork is a river that begins in the Teton Wilderness of Bridger-Teton National Forest in the U.S. state of Wyoming. The river has a north and south branch, both of which begin immediately west of the Continental Divide. Buffalo Fork travels southwest into Grand Teton National Park and empties into the Snake River adjacent to Moran, Wyoming. Buffalo Fork has a watershed which covers 323 square miles (840 km^{2}).
