= Rockefeller preserve =

Rockefeller preserve may refer to:

- Rockefeller State Park Preserve in Westchester County, New York
- Laurance S. Rockefeller Preserve within Grand Teton National Park in Wyoming
