= Charlie Greene =

Charlie Greene may refer to:

- Charlie Greene (baseball) (born 1971), former Major League Baseball backup catcher
- Charlie Greene (soccer) (born 1959), retired American soccer player
- Charlie Greene (sprinter) (born 1945), American former track and field sprinter

== See also ==
- Charles Greene (disambiguation)
- Charlie Green (disambiguation)
