= Charles Wilson Greene =

American professor of physiology and pharmacology

- Born: 1866; Crawford Co., Indiana
- Died: 1947 (aged 80–81)
- Scientific career
- Fields: Physiology; Pharmacology
- Workplaces: DePauw; Stanford University; University of Missouri; United States Bureau of Fisheries

Charles Wilson Greene (1866–1947) was an American professor of physiology and pharmacology from Indiana.

== Biography ==
Greene was born in Milltown, Indiana. He graduated from DePauw Normal School in 1889 and from Leland Stanford in 1892. He was a physiology instructor from 1893 to 1896, when he began his Ph.D. at Johns Hopkins with Henry Newell Martin. In 1895, Greene married Flora Hartley. He completed his Ph.D. in 1898 and taught at DePauw Normal and Preparatory schools from 1889 to 1891, and at Stanford University between 1891 and 1900, when he became professor of physiology and pharmacology at the University of Missouri. There, he established the first laboratory for experimental pharmacology in the Mississippi Valley.

From 1901 to 1911 he also carried on investigations for the United States Bureau of Fisheries. His researches covered the structure and function of phosphorescent organs in the toadfish, the circulatory system of the hagfish, the physiology of the Chinook salmon, and the influence of inorganic salts on the cardiac tissues. He was editor of Kirke's Handbook of Physiology (Sixth American Revision, 1907) and authored Experimental Pharmacology (1905; third edition, 1909) and Textbook of Pharmacology (1914). He was involved in many national professional organizations. He was secretary of the American Physiological Society from 1915 to 1923 and that organization's president from 1934 to 1935.

Greene died on May 1, 1947.

== Eponymy ==
The Shoshone sculpin (Cottus greenei) was named in honour of Greene by Charles Henry Gilbert and George Bliss Culver in 1898.
