= Charles Green (cricketer) =

English cricketer

Charles Ernest Green (26 August 1846 – 4 December 1916) was an English cricketer active from 1865 to 1881 who played for Middlesex and Sussex. He was born in Walthamstow and died in Epping. He appeared in 94 first-class matches as a righthanded batsman who bowled right arm fast with a roundarm action. He scored 2,488 runs with a highest score of 72 and took 66 wickets with a best performance of eight for 66.

Green was educated at Uppingham School and Trinity College, Cambridge. He played cricket for Cambridge 1865–68, and was captain in 1868. He also earned a blue for athletics (high jump). He was president of Marylebone Cricket Club in 1905.
