= Charles Robert Mortimer Green =

English surgeon (1863–1950)

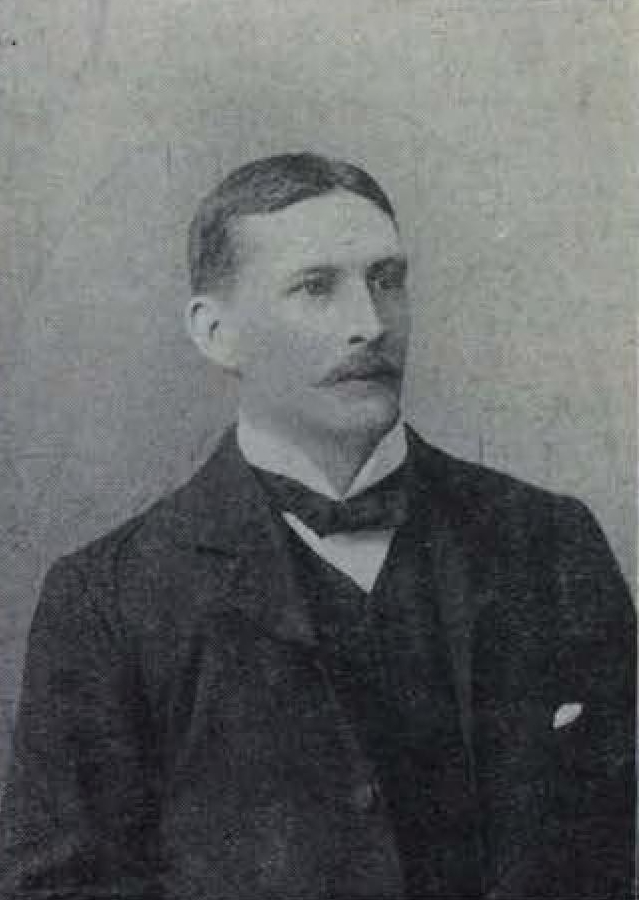
c. 1907

Charles Robert Mortimer Green (21 May 1863–10 April 1950) was a surgeon in the Indian Medical Service. He wrote a book on the Management of Children in India (1913).
