= Charles Dymoke Green Jr. =

Chairman of the World Scout Committee

Personal details
- Born: 10 February 1907 Harpenden, St Albans, Hertfordshire
- Died: 23 October 1988 (aged 81) Watford, Hertfordshire, Hertfordshire

Charles Dymoke Green Jr. CBE (10 February 1907 – 23 October 1988) was The Boy Scouts Association's Commonwealth commissioner until 1970 and the World Organization of the Scout Movement's committee chairman.

His father, Charles Dymoke Green Senior was also an official of The Boy Scouts Association in the United Kingdom.

In 1941, he was The Boy Scouts Association Rover commissioner in Colombo, Ceylon and organized a unit of mounted Scouts. He supported Kingsley C. Dassanaike’s work to promote Scouting for the deaf and blind. In 1971, the World Organization of the Scout Movement awarded him its 63rd Bronze Wolf, its only distinction, for exceptional services to world Scouting, the Scout Association of Japan awarded him its Golden Pheasant Award, its highest distinction, and the Boy Scouts of America awarded him its first Silver World Award.
