= Charley Green =

American boxer (1942-2014)

Charley "Devil" Green
Personal information
- Nickname: Devil
- Nationality: American
- Born: Charles Green; September 1, 1942 Mississippi, United States
- Died: November 28, 2014 (aged 72) United States
- Height: 5 ft 10 in (178 cm)
- Weight: Light Heavyweight

Boxing career
- Stance: Orthodox

Boxing record
- Total fights: 28
- Wins: 13
- Win by KO: 8
- Losses: 15
- Draws: 0

Charles Green (September 1, 1942 – November 28, 2014), known professionally as Charley "Devil" Green, was an American professional boxer and convicted murderer who competed from 1966 to 1975.

== Early life ==
Charles Green was born in Mississippi during the 1940s.

== Professional boxing career ==
Fighting under the name "Devil" Green, he became a regular contender in New York boxing by the mid-1960s, particularly at Madison Square Garden. Among his early opponents were Frankie DePaula and Jimmy Dupree.

On July 14, 1969, Green showed up at Madison Square Garden to watch his old sparring partner José Torres fight Jimmy Ralston. After Ralston pulled out, Garden matchmaker Duke Stefano and boxing director Teddy Brenner offered Green $3,500 to step in on short notice. The last minute substitute, cornered by Hall of Fame trainer Gil Clancy, scored an early knockdown of Torres, later suffering a 2nd-round KO loss.

Charley Green faced 30-2-1 Ray Anderson at the Felt Forum in April 1970, winning by TKO.

In 1970, 28-year-old Green prepared to fight Floyd Patterson, who was returning after a two-year hiatus, training at Telstar Gym on New York’s west side. During their 10-round fight at Madison Square Garden, Green reopened a cut over Patterson's eye but was stopped by knockout in the closing moments of the final round.

Green travelled to Ghent in January 1975 and faced Belgian boxer Jean Pierre Coopman in his second-to-last fight. The journeyman's last fight was against an undefeated Larry Holmes at the Richfield Coliseum in March 1975.

== Professional boxing record ==
28 fights	13 wins	15 losses
By knockout	8	7
By decision	5	8

According to BoxRec, Green's won-lost-drawn record is 13-15-0 with 8 knockouts.

== Life after boxing ==
In September 1983, Green shot five people in a Harlem apartment described as a "cocaine den," killing two and wounding three. Following the incident, Green appeared at his lawyer's office in lower Manhattan and became distressed when the lawyer had not yet arrived. He was later taken into custody after threatening to jump from a 15th-floor window at 225 Broadway. Authorities charged Green with two murders and three attempted murder counts.
