= Charles Dymoke Green Sr. =

Charles Dymoke Green, senior
- Born: 28 May 1873
- Died: 1954 (aged 80–81)
- Known for: Personal friend of Robert Baden-Powell

Charles Dymoke Green, senior (28 May 1873 – 1954) was an early official of The Boy Scouts Association, its District Commissioner of Saint Albans from at least 1912 to 1948, secretary of the association, October 1917 to July 1918 and a personal friend of Robert Baden-Powell.

His sons, Charles Dymoke Green Jr. and George “Jim” Dymoke Green (editor of The Scouter, 1928–1929), were also prominent officials of The Boy Scouts Association.
