= Fanindra Nath Gooptu =

Bengali merchant and nationalist leader

Fanindranath Gooptu ফণীন্দ্রনাথ গুপ্ত
- Born: Kolkata, British India
- Occupations: Industrialist, Swadeshi entrepreneur
- Known for: First Indian-owned manufacturer in Kolkata
- Parent: Gopal Chandra Gooptu

Fanindranath Gooptu (Bengali ফণীন্দ্রনাথ গুপ্ত) mostly known as F.N. Gooptu was an Indian industrialist. He led manufacturing of writing instruments such as fountain pens with an indigenous process, pencils, nips of fountain pens, ink etc. His own company F. N. Gooptu & Co. was situated at the Beliaghata region of Kolkata, India.

== Early life and family ==
Fanindranath was born in the Gooptu family of Kolkata. His father Gopal chandra Gooptu was an industrialist. His grandfather Dwarkanath Gooptu was the first year student of Calcutta Medical College, assistant of Madhusudan Gupta who performed India's first human dissection at Calcutta Medical College in 1836, almost 3,000 years after Susruta. Fanindranath completed his B.A. from Presidency College.

== Industrial career ==
After completing his academic career Fanindranath joined in D.Gooptu's company. Then in 1905-06, during the Swadeshi movement, the indigenous pen and pencil factories were established by him. In India, he is known as a pioneer for making Fountain Pen. In 1908, he formed a platform named Bengal Initiative for the development of Bengal with the artists of Bengal, government bureaucracy, educationists and thinkers. Acharya Prafulla Chandra Roy and Dadabhai Naoroji are the rewarded member of this platform.

== Social career ==
Fanindranath Gupta did not go directly to the Swadeshi Movement like other revolutionaries. He realised the necessity of establishing Indian factory in Bengal to make Bengal self-reliant. In 1905, at the age of twenty years, he established his own pen factory. Later in 1910, there was a large factory in Belleghta. Mahatma Gandhi visited his factory in Calcutta in 1925 and said that he was proud of the image of Swadeshi Movement in Bengal.

== Popularity ==
Mahatma Gandhi was pleased with the new enterprise and genuflected him. He said —

F. N. GOOPTU & CO., It has been a great pleasure to me to be able to visit this pencil and pen holder factory. I was delighted to be informed some of the machines were designed and made in this factory. I wish this national enterprise every success.
