= Sushruta Samhita =

Ancient Sanskrit medical compendium

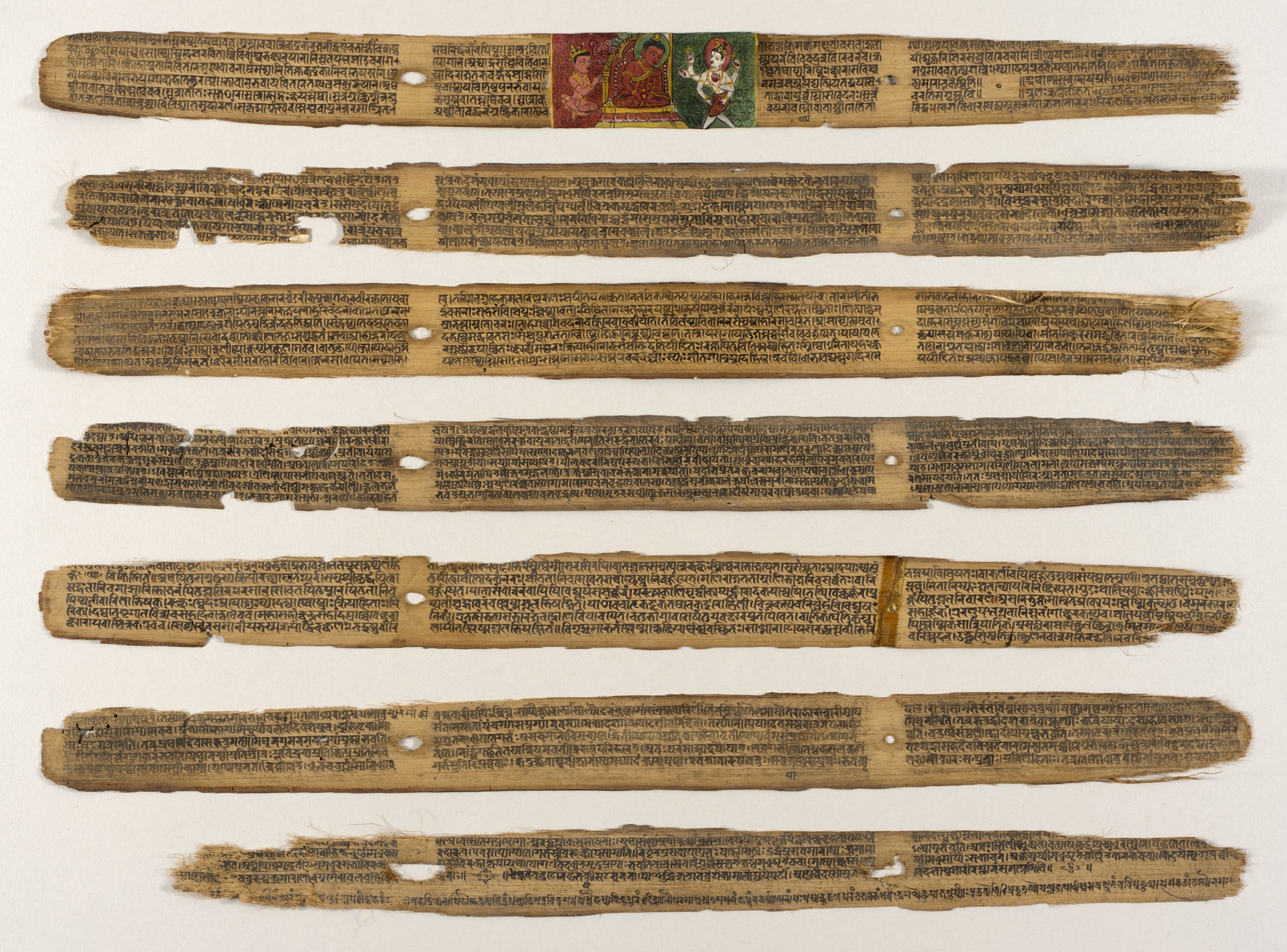
Palm leaves of the Sushruta Samhita or Sahottara-Tantra from Nepal, stored at Los Angeles County Museum of Art. The text is dated 12th-13th century while the art is dated 18th-19th century.

The Sushruta Samhita (Sanskrit: सुश्रुतसंहिता, lit. 'Suśruta's Compendium', IAST: Suśrutasaṃhitā) is an ancient Sanskrit text on medicine and one of the most important such treatises on this subject to survive from the ancient world. The Compendium of Suśruta is one of the foundational texts of Ayurveda, alongside the Charaka-Saṃhitā, the Bhela-Saṃhitā, and the medical portions of the Bower Manuscript. It is one of two foundational Hindu texts on the medical profession that have survived from ancient India.

The Suśrutasaṃhitā is of great historical importance because it includes historically unique chapters describing surgical training, instruments and procedures. The oldest surviving manuscript of the Suśrutasaṃhitā is MS Kathmandu KL 699, a palm-leaf manuscript preserved at the Kaiser Library, Nepal, dated to 878 AD.

== History ==
Ancient qualifications of a Nurse

That person alone is fit to nurse or to attend the bedside of a patient, who is cool-headed and pleasant in his demeanor, does not speak ill of any body, is strong and attentive to the requirements of the sick, and strictly and indefatigably follows the instructions of the physician.

— Sushruta Samhita Book 1, Chapter XXXIV
Translator: Bhishagratna

=== Date ===
The most detailed and extensive consideration of the date of the Suśrutasaṃhitā is that published by Gerrit Jan Meulenbeld in his History of Indian Medical Literature (1999–2002). Meulenbeld states that the Suśrutasaṃhitā is likely a work that includes several historical layers, whose composition may have begun in the last centuries BCE and was completed by another author who redacted its first five sections and added the long, final section, the Uttaratantra. It is likely that the Suśruta-saṃhitā was known to the scholar Dṛḍhabala (fl. 300–500 CE), which gives the latest date for the version of the work that has survived into the modern era.

In Suśrutasaṃhitā - A Scientific Synopsis, the authors noted the following view, which is broadly the same as Meulenbeld's:

"The Chronology Committee of the National Institute of Sciences of India (Proceedings, 1952), was of the opinion that third to fourth centuries A. D. may be accepted as the date of the recension of the Suśruta Saṃhitā by Nāgārjuna, which formed the basis of Dallaṇa's commentary."

The above view remains the consensus amongst university scholars of the history of Indian medicine and Sanskrit literature.

==== Hoernle's view ====
Rudolf Hoernlé (1841–1918) proposed in 1907 that because the author of the Śatapathabrāhmaṇa, a Vedic text from the mid-first-millennium BCE, was aware of Sushruta's doctrines, Sushruta's work should be dated based on the composition date of Śatapathabrāhmaṇa. The composition date of the Brahmana was itself unclear, added Hoernle, but he estimated it to be about the sixth century BCE. However, Hoernle's view was based on the unexamined assumption that the ideas about the human skeleton in the Suśrutasaṃhitā preceded those of the Brāhmaṇa. He seems never to have questioned this assumption.

Hoernle's date of 600 BCE for the Suśrutasaṃhitā was challenged by intervening scholarship over the last century. This scholarship was summarized by Meulenbeld in his History of Indian Medical Literature.

Central to the problem of chronology is the fact that the Suśrutasaṃhitā was the work of several hands. The internal tradition recorded in manuscript colophons and by medieval commentators makes clear that an old version of the Suśrutasaṃhitā consisted of sections 1-5, with the sixth part having been added by a later author. However, the oldest extant manuscripts include the sixth section, called "The Later Book" (Skt. Uttara-tantra). Manuscript colophons refer to the whole work as "The Suśrutasaṃhitā together with the Uttara-tantra," reinforcing the idea that they are a combined work. Thus, it does not make sense to speak of "the date of Suśruta." Like "Hippocrates," the name "Suśruta" refers to the work of many authors working over several centuries.

==== Further views on chronology ====
As mentioned above, scores of scholars have proposed hypotheses on the formation and dating of the Suśrutasaṃhitā, ranging from 2000 BCE to the sixth century CE. These views have been gathered and described by the medical historian Jan Meulenbeld.

=== Authorship ===
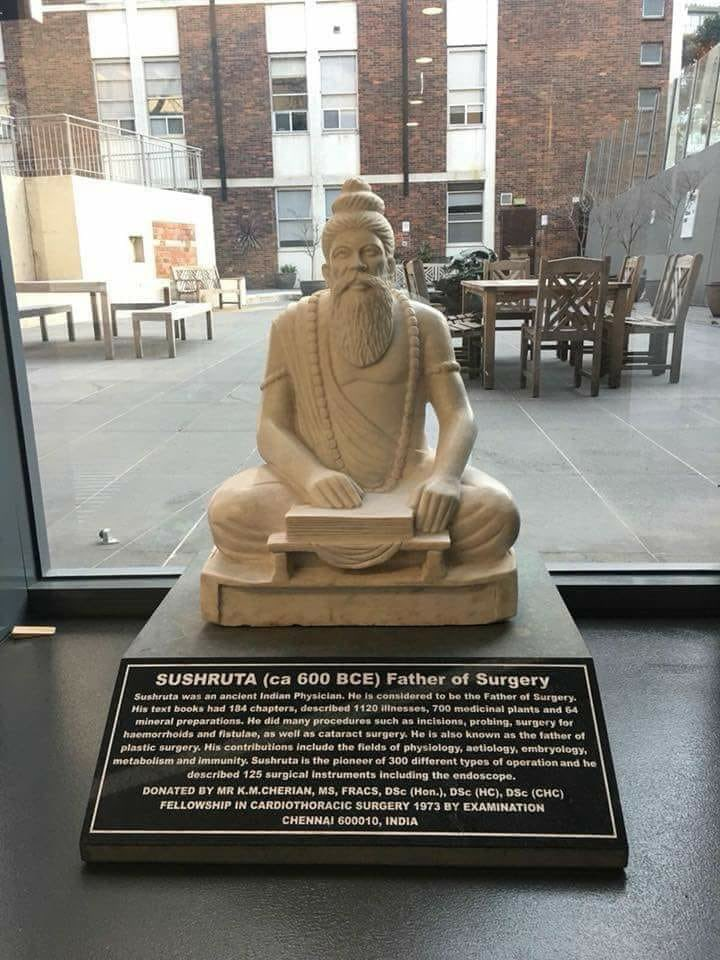
A statue of Sushruta (600 BCE) at Royal Australasian College of Surgeons (RACS) in Melbourne, Australia

Sushruta or Suśruta (Sanskrit: सुश्रुत, IAST: Suśruta, lit. 'well heard', an adjective meaning "renowned") is named in the text as the author, who is presented in later manuscripts and printed editions a narrating the teaching of his guru, Divodāsa. Early Buddhist Jatakas mention a Divodāsa as a physician who lived and taught in ancient Kashi (Varanasi). The earliest known mentions of the name Suśruta firmly associated with the tradition of the Suśrutasaṃhitā is in the Bower Manuscript (4th or 5th century CE), where Suśruta is listed as one of the ten sages residing in the Himalayas.

After a review of all past scholarship on the identity of Suśruta, Meulenbeld concluded that:

As is obvious from the foregoing, it is rather generally assumed that we owe the main part of the Suśrutasaṃhitā or an earlier version of it to a historical person called Suśruta. This assumption, however, is not based on uncontrovertible evidence and may be illusory. The text of the Suśrutasaṃhitā does not warrant that the one who composed it was a Suśruta. The structure of the treatise shows without ambiguity that the author, who created a coherent whole out of earlier material, attributed the teachings incorporated in his work to Kāśirāja Divodāsa...

=== Religious affiliation ===
The text has been called a Hindu text by many scholars. The text discusses surgery with the same terminology found in more ancient Hindu texts, mentions Hindu gods such as Narayana, Hari, Brahma, Rudra, Indra and others in its chapters, refers to the scriptures of Hinduism namely the Vedas, and in some cases, recommends exercise, walking and "constant study of the Vedas" as part of the patient's treatment and recovery process. The text also uses terminology of Vaiśeṣika, Samkhya and other schools of Hindu philosophy.

The Sushruta Samhita and Caraka Samhita have religious ideas throughout, states Steven Engler, who then concludes "Vedic elements are too central to be discounted as marginal". These ideas include the use of terms and same metaphors that are variously pervasive in Buddhist and Hindu scriptures – the Vedas, and the inclusion of theory of Karma, self (Atman) and Brahman (metaphysical reality) along the lines of those found in ancient Hindu and Buddhist texts. However, adds Engler, the text also includes another layer of ideas, where empirical rational ideas flourish in competition or cooperation with religious ideas. Following Engler's study, contemporary scholars have abandoned the distinction "religious" vs. "empirico-rational" as no longer being a useful analytical distinction.

The text may have Buddhist influences, since a redactor named Nagarjuna has raised many historical questions, although he cannot have been the person of Mahayana Buddhism fame. Zysk produced evidence that the medications and therapies mentioned in the Pāli Canon bear strong resemblances and are sometimes identical to those of the Suśrutasaṃhitā and the Carakasaṃhitā.

In general, states Zysk, Buddhist medical texts are closer to Sushruta than to Caraka, and in his study suggests that the Sushruta Samhita probably underwent a "Hinduization process" around the end of 1st millennium BCE and the early centuries of the common era after the Hindu orthodox identity had formed. Clifford states that the influence was probably mutual, with Buddhist medical practice in its ancient tradition prohibited outside of the Buddhist monastic order by a precedent set by Buddha, and Buddhist text praise Buddha instead of Hindu gods in their prelude. The mutual influence between the medical traditions between the various Indian religions, the history of the layers of the Suśruta-saṃhitā remains unclear, a large and difficult research problem.

Sushruta is reverentially held in Hindu tradition to be a descendant of Dhanvantari, the mythical god of medicine, or as one who received the knowledge from a discourse from Dhanvantari in Varanasi.

=== Manuscripts and transmission ===
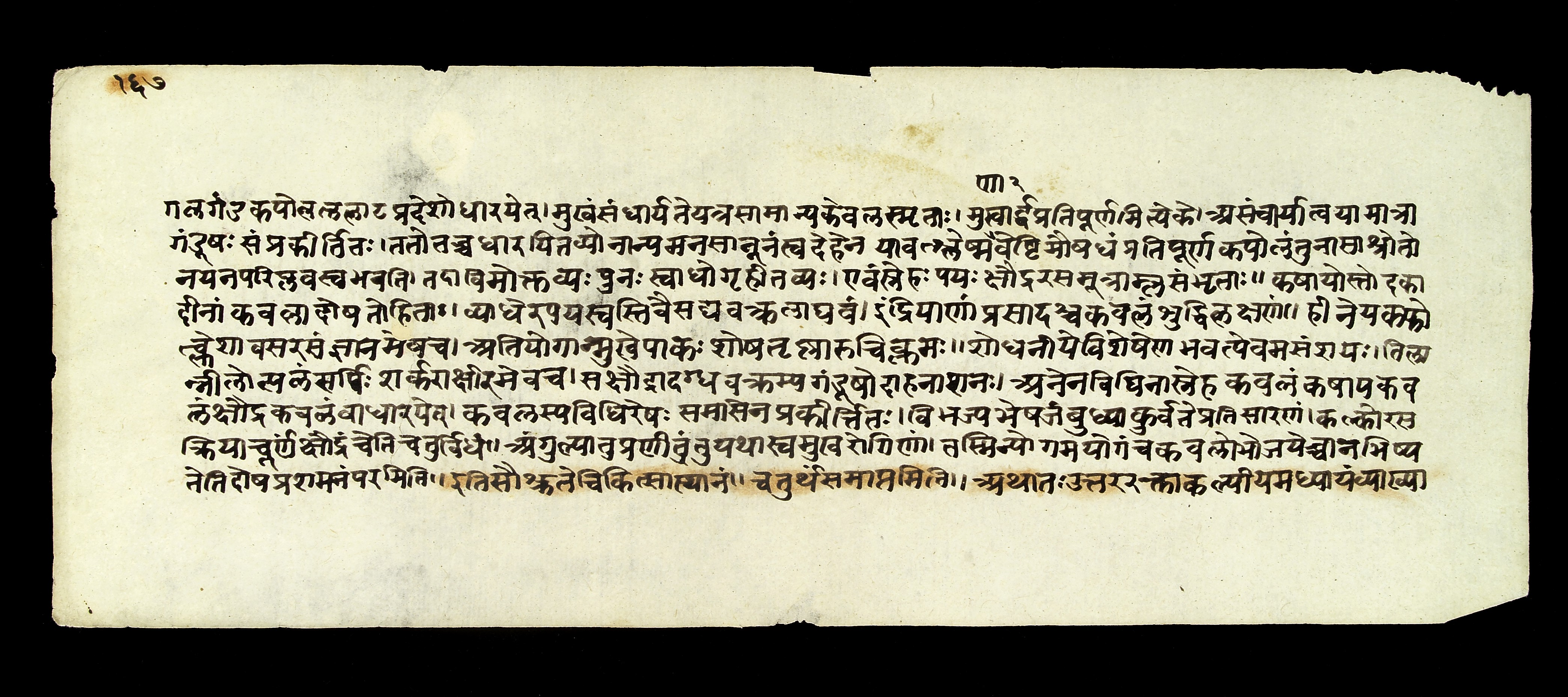
A page from the ancient medical text, Susruta Samhita.

The oldest known manuscript of the Sushruta Samhita is preserved at the Kaiser Library, Kathmandu, Nepal as manuscript MS Kathmandu Kaiser Library 699. A microfilm copy of the MS was created by Nepal-German Manuscript Preservation Project (NGMCP C 80/7) and is stored in the National Archives, Kathmandu. The partially damaged manuscript consists of 152 folios, written on both sides, with 6 to 8 lines in transitional Gupta script. The manuscript has been verifiably dated to have been completed by the scribe on Sunday, April 13, 878 CE (Manadeva Samvat 301).

Much of the scholarship on the Suśruta-saṃhitā is based on editions of the text that were published during the nineteenth and early twentieth centuries. This includes the important edition by Vaidya Yādavaśarman Trivikramātmaja Ācārya that also includes the commentary of the scholar Dalhaṇa.

The printed editions are based on the small subset of surviving manuscripts that was available in the major publishing centers of Bombay, Calcutta and elsewhere when the editions were being prepared – sometimes as few as three or four manuscripts. But these do not adequately represent the large number of manuscript versions of the Suśruta-saṃhitā that have survived into the modern era. Taken together, all printed versions of the Suśrutasaṃhitā are based on no more than ten percent of the more than 230 manuscripts of the work that exist today.

== Contents ==
Anatomy and empirical studies

The different parts or members of the body as mentioned before including the skin, cannot be correctly described by one who is not well versed in anatomy. Hence, any one desirous of acquiring a thorough knowledge of anatomy should prepare a dead body and carefully, observe, by dissecting it, and examine its different parts.

— Sushruta Samhita, Book 3, Chapter V
Translators: Loukas et al

The Sushruta Samhita is among the most important ancient medical treatises. It is one of the foundational texts of the medical tradition in India, alongside the Caraka-Saṃhitā, the Bheḷa-Saṃhitā, and the medical portions of the Bower Manuscript.

=== Scope ===
The relative chronology of the Sushruta Samhita and the Charaka Samhita remains an open research question (in 2025). Except for some topics and their emphasis, both discuss many similar subjects such as General Principles, Pathology, Diagnosis, Anatomy, Sensorial Prognosis, Therapeutics, Pharmaceutics and Toxicology.

The Sushruta and Charaka texts differ in one major aspect, with Sushruta Samhita providing more detailed descriptions of surgery, surgical instruments and surgical training. The Charaka Samhita mentions surgery, but only briefly.

=== Chapters ===
The Sushruta Samhita, in its extant form, is divided into 186 chapters and contains descriptions of 1,120 illnesses, 700 medicinal plants, 64 preparations from mineral sources and 57 preparations based on animal sources.

The Suśruta-Saṃhitā is divided into two parts: the first five books (Skt. Sthanas) are considered to be the oldest part of the text, and the "Later Section" (Skt. Uttaratantra) that was added perhaps by an author named Nagarjuna. The Uttaratantra is itself divided into internal subsections: surgery (Śālakyatantra 1-26), children's medicine (Kumāratantra 27-38), therapy (Kāyacikitsā 39-59), supernatural beings (Bhūtavidyā 60-62), and generic supplement (Tantrabhūṣaṇa 63-66).

The content of these 186 chapters is diverse, some topics are covered in multiple chapters in different books. A summary according to the Bhishagratna's translation is as follows:

Sushruta Samhita
| Book | Chapter | Topics (incomplete) (Note: Bhishagratna translation includes parts of Dalhana commentary, and used modern medical terminology and Western words such as "egg" for sonita (menstrual blood), an approach that has led scholars to question parts of his translation.) | Translation; Comments |
1. Sutra-sthana; 1.I / Origin of the Ayurveda: eight divisions, history, definition of Purusha (patient), what is a disease, stages of a disease, classifications; 1.II / Medical education: qualifications of a student, oath of care, promise of the student to the teacher, ethical prohibitions; 1.III / Classification of (Original) Samhita: Table of contents, synopsis of the text, skilful and unskilful physicians, how to study for medical practice, need for "constant practice to attain perfection"; 1.IV / Preface and explanations: Need for clear exposition, defects resulting from unclear statements, duties of a student; 1.V / Preliminary surgical measures: Types of surgical operations, collecting equipment and accessories, prophylactics, modes of incision, post surgical steps, dressing wounds, instructions to the patient after surgery, measures to remove pain; 1.VI / Seasons and their influence on health and medicine: effect of weather, change in weather, causes of epidemics, prophylactic measures, natural and unnatural seasons; 1.VII / Surgical appliances, their use and construction: names, dimensions, use and functions, excellence of each appliance, defect of each appliance, accessories; 1.VIII / Surgical instruments, their use and construction: handling instruments, sharpening, edging, tempering, maintenance, when should each be used and not used; 1.IX / Training for surgery: use of dummies and fruits to learn and pre-practice surgery; 1.X / Qualifications and certification of a physician: effect of weather, change in weather, causes of epidemics, prophylactic measures, natural and unnatural seasons; 1.XI / Preparing Alkalis, their uses: how to prepare the solutions, external and internal uses, cauterization, potencies, defects, dangers, reaction, preventing abuse; 1.XII / Cauterization: preparation and process for various injuries and diseases, various types of cauterization; 1.XIII / Leeching: suitable and unsuitable patients, mode of vitiating dhatu (blood), finding, collecting and keeping leeches, good leeches and bad leeches, post-treatment measures; 1.XIV / Lymph chyle: menstrual blood and its nature, swellings, venesection, causes of excessive bleeding, causes of scanty bleeding, measures to be adopted in either; 1.XV / Excretory disorders: nature, locations, theory of why they increase or decrease; 1.XVI / Ear piercing and bandages: proper piercing, accidents, treatments; 1.XVII / Swellings: types, suppurating and non-suppurating, causes, symptoms, treatments, dangers of misdiagnosis, anaesthesia, lancing, surgery; 1.XVIII / Ulcers: classification, preparing medicinal plasters, dressing, evils of not bandaging, benefits of bandaging, when not to bandage, lubricating bandage for faster healing; 1.XIX / Nursing and management: bed, chamber, prohibited articles, prophylaxis and mantras against monsters and demons, diet, conduct, care; 1.XX / Food and regimen for patient's recovery: Food and drinks, their role in patient's recovery, salutary regimen, non-salutary regimen; 1.XXI / Vayu, Pittam and Shleshma: the role and impact of diseases on Vayu, Pittam and Shleshma (body aeration, body fluids); 1.XXII / Boils and ulcers, secretions: shapes, types, secretion, role of Vayu, pains and their kinds associated with different types of ulcers, colors of ulcers; 1.XXIII / Prognosis of ulcers: symptoms, identification of curable and incurable types, palliation, factors which reopen healed ulcer; 1.XXIV / Classification of diseases, deciding if medicine or surgery is needed: types of diseases, congenital, mental, physical, providential; causes of fever; 1.XXV / Eight forms of surgery: description, suitability in different cases, avoiding injuries to blood vessels and ligaments, action if accidentally injured; 1.XXVI / Injuries from splinters: Shalyam, accidental injuries, arrow injuries, necessity for removing arrow shafts; 1.XXVII / Injuries, extraction of splinters: fifteen methods of extraction, dangers of not extracting splinters completely from a wound; 1.XXVIII / Progress in treating ulcer: signs of improvement, signs of worsening, fatal symptoms; 1.XXIX / Disease prognosis, use of omens, augury: Dreams and their analysis for diagnosis; 1.XXX / Prognosis from sense organs: Testing sensory functions of a patient for symptoms and disease prognosis; 1.XXXI - 1.XLVI / Various topics
2. Nidana-sthana; 2.I / Nervous system diseases: causes, pathology, symptoms, prognosis. Epilepsy, Hemiplegia, Torticellis, Facial paralysis, Indistinct speech, etc.; 2.II / Haemorhoids: classification, causes, pathology, symptoms, prognosis.; 2.III / Urinary calculli: Aetiology, symptoms, indications, theory on how bladder stones are formed; 2.IV / Fistula: classification, pathology, symptoms, prognosis.; 2.V / Skin diseases: classification, aetiology, symptoms, treatment, contagious nature, avoiding its spread, prognosis.; 2.VI / Urinary diseases: pathology, symptoms, prognosis.; 2.VII / Dropsy: classification, causes, pathology, symptoms, prognosis.; 2.VIII / Birth, Difficult labor: causes, classification, symptoms, abortion, miscarriage, prognosis.; 2.IX / Abscess, Vidradhi: classification, curability, treatment; 2.X / Mammary glands diseases (women): classification, symptoms, healthy breast milk and its character, abnormal traits, baby care; 2.XI / Tumors and goitres: classification, symptoms, causes, prognosis; 2.XII / Andrology and gynecology: genital organ diseases, classification, symptoms, causes, prognosis; 2.XIII / Kshudra roga: minor diseases, classification, symptoms, causes, prognosis; 2.XIV / Shuka dosha: classification, symptoms, prognosis; 2.XV / Fracture and dislocation: causes, features, symptoms, classification, curable and incurable types, treatment, management; 2.XVI / Mouth, tongue, larynx and lip diseases: classification, causes, symptoms, classification, prognosis
3. Sarira-sthana; 3.I / Theory of Being: Tattvas, Purusha and Prakriti, Samkhya theories and its use in medical practice, human mind; 3.II / Reproductive health: classification of semen and menstrual fluid, disorders, treatment, sexual activity for conception, difficulty in conception, causes, description of fetus; 3.III / Pregnancy: Theory of Sarira (body, matter), Atman (soul), theory on gender formation, signs of pregnancy, care of pregnant woman, fetal development, cravings, twin, time of delivery, care during labor; 3.IV / Womb, baby development: theory on placenta, limbs, organ development during pregnancy; 3.V / Human anatomy: Enumeration of limbs, body organs, their numbers, vessels, bones, joints, Sandhis, ligaments, muscles, differences between organs of men and women, reproductive organs; 3.VI / Marmas, vital organs: classification, numbering and location of organs, different theories on which organs are vital, symptoms associated with specific organs when injured; 3.VII / Vascular system: classification, numbering and location of Siras (vascular system); 3.VIII / Venesection: classification and definition, determining who is fit and who unfit for venesection; 3.IX / Arteries, Nerves and Ducts: classification, locations, theory on their roles, symptoms in cases of disorder; 3.X / Nursing, care of pregnant women: needs from conception to parturition, regimen during gestation, diet, natal rites, lactation, infantile diseases, miscarriage and its treatment, management of pregnancy
4. Cikitsa-sthana; 4.I / Ulcers: causes, symptoms, traumatic and idiopathic ulcers, dosha-originated ulcers, therapeutics, sixty treatments of different types of ulcers; 4.II - 4.XXIII / Various topics: Treatment of ulcers, wounds, sores, fractures, nervous disorders, urinary infections, skin infections, tumors, swellings, hernia, hydrocele, genital sores, urethra infections, mouth infections, other minor ailments; 4.XXIII - 4.XL / Various topics on Hygiene: tooth brushing, dental care, face care, hands and feet washing, bathing, exercise, healthy meal, rules on drinking water, benefits of Dahi (yoghurt), good sleep, effect of not taking care of body, improving strength, elixirs, rejuvenators, remedial agents, Soma, tonics, Sneha, Sveda, Emetics, Purgatives, effects of abusing or overdosing medicine and solutions, use of Dhuma (fumes) and Kavala (gargling) for relief from some symptoms.
5. Kalpa-sthana; 5.I / Preserving food and drink: theory on why food or drink poisons, how to detect poisoned food or drink, treatment of food poisoning; 5.II - 5.VIII / Various topics on Poisons: Classification, description and treatment of animal poisons, snake bite, rat poisoning, scorpions, spiders, other insect bites
6. Uttara-tantra; 6.I-6.XIX / Eye disorders, injuries and infections: eye diseases, appendages, causes of eye diseases, symptoms, eyelid infections and their treatment, classification of eye lens problems and prognosis, need and protocols for eye surgery, eye injuries and their treatment; 6.XX-6.XXI / Ear disorders, injuries and infections: ear diseases, causes and their treatment; 6.XXII-6.XXIII / Nose disorders, injuries and infections: classification of nose diseases, symptoms and their treatment; 6.XXV-6.XXVI / Head diseases: classification of head diseases, symptoms and their treatment; 6.XXVII-6.XXXVII / Malignant grahas: attack by grahas (superhuman influences), symptoms, procedures for sprinkling, fumigation and mantra recitals; 6.XXXIX-6.LIII / Fever, diarrhea, phthisis, gulma, heart disease, jaundice, hemorrhage, alcoholism, vomiting, asthma, cough: classification, symptoms, causes, prognosis, changes in diet as cure, use of drinks, milk and meat as medicine.; 6.LIV-6.LIX / Worms, problem urinating, other diseases: classification, symptoms, causes, prognosis; 6.LXII / Insanity: type, symptoms and treatment; 6.LXIV / Rules of health: indications and importance of health, knowledge of foods, varying food intake with seasons, effective ways to administer medicines, proper time for taking food and medicines; 6.LXV-6.LXVI / Glossary and short list: technical terms in the text, their definitions, list of diseases and drugs, various lists and their numbers

=== Prevention versus cure ===
Sushruta, states Tipton, asserts that a physician should invest the effort to prevent diseases as much as curative remedial procedures. An important means for prevention, states Sushruta, is physical exercise and hygienic practices. The text adds that excessive strenuous exercise can be injurious and make one more susceptible to diseases, cautioning against such excess. Regular moderate exercise, suggests Sushruta, improves resistance to disease and physical decay. Sushruta has written Shlokas on the prevention of diseases.

=== Human skeleton ===
The Sushruta Samhita states, per Hoernle's translation, that "the professors of Ayurveda speak of three hundred and sixty bones, but books on Shalya-Shastra (surgical science) know of only three hundred". The text then lists the total of 300 as follows: 120 in the extremities (e.g. hands, legs), 117 in the pelvic area, sides, back, abdomen and breast, and 63 in the neck and upwards. The text then explains how these subtotals were empirically verified. The discussion shows that the Indian tradition nurtured diversity of thought, with Sushruta school reaching its own conclusions and differing from the Atreya-Caraka tradition.

The osteological system of Sushruta, states Hoernle, follows the principle of homology, where the body and organs are viewed as self-mirroring and corresponding across various axes of symmetry. The differences in the count of bones in the two schools is partly because Charaka Samhita includes thirty two teeth sockets in its count, and their difference of opinions on how and when to count a cartilage as bone (both count cartilages as bones, unlike current medical practice).

=== Surgery ===
Training future surgeons

Students are to practice surgical techniques on gourds and dead animals.

— Sushruta Samhita, Book 1, Chapter IX
Translator: Engler

The Sushruta Samhita is best known in non-specialist sources on medical history for its approach and discussions of surgery. It is amongst the first medical treatises in history to suggest that a student of surgery should learn about human body and its organs by systematically examining a dead body. A student should practice, states the text, on objects resembling the diseased or body part. Incision studies, for example, are recommended on squash (Skt. puṣpaphala, Cucurbita maxima), gourd (Skt. alābu, Lagenaria vulgaris), cucumber (Skt. trapuṣa, Cucumis pubescens), leather bags filled with fluids and bladders of dead animals.

The ancient text, state Menon and Haberman, describes haemorrhoidectomy, amputations, plastic, rhinoplastic, ophthalmic, lithotomic and obstetrical procedures.

The Sushruta Samhita mentions various methods including sliding graft, rotation graft and pedicle graft. Reconstruction of a nose (rhinoplasty) which has been cut off, using a flap of skin from the cheek is also described. Labioplasty too has received attention in the samahita.

=== Rhinoplasty ===
Rhinoplasty, surgery to repair the flesh of the nose, is performed to achieve two results:

- To improve the breathing function of the nose
- To improve the cosmetic appearance of the nose

Sushruta's treatise provides the first written record of a cheek flap rhinoplasty, a technique still used today to reconstruct a nose. The text mentions more than 15 methods to repair it. These include using a flap of skin from the cheek, which is akin to the most modern technique today.

=== Medicinal herbs ===
The Sushruta Samhita, along with the religious text the Atharvaveda and the other medical encyclopedia Charak Samhita, describe more than 700 medicinal herbs. The descriptions include the herbs' taste, appearance, digestive effects, recommended dosage, and purported benefits.

== Reception ==
=== Transmission outside South Asia ===
The text was translated to Arabic as Kitab Shah Shun al-Hindi' in Arabic, also known as Kitab i-Susurud, in Baghdad during the early 8th century at the instructions of a member of the Barmakid family of Baghdad. Yahya ibn Barmak facilitated a major effort at collecting and translating Sanskrit texts such as Vagbhata's Astangahrdaya Samhita, Ravigupta's Siddhasara and Sushruta Samhita. The Arabic translation reached Europe by the end of the medieval period. There is disputed evidence that in Renaissance Italy, the Branca family of Sicily and Gasparo Tagliacozzi (Bologna) were familiar with the rhinoplastic techniques mentioned in the Sushruta Samhita.

The text was known to the Khmer king Yaśovarman I (fl. 889-900) of Cambodia. Suśruta was also known as a medical authority in Tibetan literature.

=== Commentaries ===
The earliest surviving commentary on the whole text, known as Nibandha-samgraha, was written by Dalhana in ca. 1200 CE.

Earlier commentaries existed but have only been transmitted to modern times in fragmentary form. These include lost or partially-lost commentaries by Jejjaṭa (ca. 700 CE), Gayadāsa (ca. 1000 CE), and Cakrapāṇidatta (ca. 1025 CE).

Commentaries continued to be written on the work into the nineteenth century, e.g., the Suśrutārthasandīpanī by Haranachandra written in the 19th century AD.

=== Modern reception ===
A number of Sushruta's contributions have been discussed in modern literature. Some of these include Hritshoola (heart pain), circulation of vital body fluids (such as blood (rakta dhatu) and lymph (rasa dhatu), Diabetes (Madhumeha), obesity, and hypertension. Kearns & Nash (2008) state that the first mention of leprosy is described in Sushruta Samhita. The text discusses kidney stones and its surgical removal. Columbia University’s Irving Medical Centre noted that in 600 BCE Indian physician Sushruta Samhita documented instructions for performing complex surgical procedures, including three types of skin grafts and reconstruction of the nose.

== Editions and translations ==
The first printed edition of the text was prepared by Madhusudan Gupta (2 vols, Calcutta 1835, 1836). A partial English translation by U. C. Datta appeared in 1883. The first complete English translation of the Sushruta Samhita was by Kaviraj Kunjalal Bhishagratna, who published it in three volumes between 1907 and 1916 (reprinted 1963, 2006). Although Bhishagratna's translation is now obsolete, it is often still cited by non-specialists because it is out of copyright, has been reprinted often, and is also now easily available as online scans.

An alternative English translation of both the Sushruta Samhita and Dalhana's commentary was published in three volumes by P. V. Sharma in 1999.

== See also ==
- Hindu texts, Indian religious literature
- On Ancient Medicine, Greek medical text, written c. 450–400 B.C.
- Sushruta
- Ayurveda
- History of embryology

== Bibliography ==
- Boslaugh, Sarah (2007). Encyclopedia of Epidemiology. Vol. 1. SAGE Publications. ISBN 978-1412928168.
- Balodhi, J. P. (1987). "Constituting the outlines of a philosophy of Ayurveda: mainly on mental health import". Indian Journal of Psychiatry. 29 (2): 127–31. PMC 3172459. PMID 21927226.
- Banerjee, Anirban D.; et al. (2011). "Susruta and Ancient Indian Neurosurgery". World Neurosurgery. 75 (2): 320–323. doi:10.1016/j.wneu.2010.09.007. PMID 21492737.
- Bhishagratna, Kaviraj KL (1907). An English Translation of the Sushruta Samhita in Three Volumes, (Volume 1, Archived by University of Toronto). Calcutta. Archived from the original on 4 November 2008. Alt URL
- Bhishagratna, Kaviraj KL (1911). An English Translation of the Sushruta Samhita in Three Volumes, (Volume 2, Archived by University of Toronto). Calcutta. Archived from the original on 31 August 2008. Alt URL
- Bhishagratna, Kaviraj KL (1916). An English Translation of the Sushruta Samhita in Three Volumes, (Volume 3, Archived by University of Toronto). Calcutta. Archived from the original on 4 February 2010. Alt URL
- Dwivedi, Girish; Dwivedi, Shridhar (2007). "History of Medicine: Sushruta – the Clinician – Teacher par Excellence" (PDF). Indian Journal of Chest Diseases and Allied Sciences. 49 (4).
- Engler, Steven (2003). "" Science" vs." Religion" in Classical Ayurveda". Numen. 50 (4): 416–463. doi:10.1163/156852703322446679. hdl:11205/105.
- Hoernle, A. F. Rudolf (1907). Studies in the Medicine of Ancient India: Osteology or the Bones of the Human Body. Oxford, UK: Clarendon Press.
- Kutumbian, P. (2005). Ancient Indian Medicine. Orient Longman. ISBN 978-812501521-5.
- Loukas, M; et al. (2010). "Anatomy in ancient India: A focus on the Susruta Samhita". Journal of Anatomy. 217 (6): 646–650. doi:10.1111/j.1469-7580.2010.01294.x. PMC 3039177. PMID 20887391.
- Rana, R. E.; Arora, B. S. (2002). "History of plastic surgery in India". Journal of Postgraduate Medicine. 48 (1): 76–8. PMID 12082339.
- Rây, Priyadaranjan; et al. (1980). Suśruta saṃhitā: a scientific synopsis. Indian National Science Academy. OCLC 7952879.
- Meulenbeld, Gerrit Jan (1999). A History of Indian Medical Literature. Groningen: Brill (all volumes, 1999-2002). ISBN 978-9069801247.
- Sharma, P. V. (1992). History of medicine in India, from antiquity to 1000 A.D. New Delhi: Indian National Science Academy. OCLC 26881970.
- Schultheisz, E. (1981). History of Physiology. Pergamon Press. ISBN 978-0080273426.
- Raveenthiran, Venkatachalam (2011). "Knowledge of ancient Hindu surgeons on Hirschsprung disease: evidence from Sushruta Samhita of circa 1200-600 bc". Journal of Pediatric Surgery. 46 (11): 2204–2208. doi:10.1016/j.jpedsurg.2011.07.007. PMID 22075360.
- Tipton, Charles (2008). "Susruta of India, an unrecognized contributor to the history of exercise physiology". Journal of Applied Physiology. 104 (6): 1553–1556. doi:10.1152/japplphysiol.00925.2007. PMID 18356481. S2CID 22761582.
- Valiathan, M. S (2007). The legacy of Suśruta. Orient Longman. ISBN 9788125031505. OCLC 137222991.
- Walton, John (1994). The Oxford medical companion. Oxford New York: Oxford University Press. ISBN 978-0-19-262355-3.
- Zysk, Kenneth (2000). Asceticism and Healing in Ancient India: Medicine in the Buddhist Monastery. Motilal Banarsidass. ISBN 978-8120815285.
- Chari PS. 'Sushruta and our heritage', Indian Journal of Plastic Surgery.
