= Dalhana =

Commentator of Sushruta Samhita, an Indian author

Dalhana was a medieval commentator on the Sushruta Samhita, an early text on Indian medicine. Dalhana's commentary is known as the Nibandha Samgraha. It compiles the views of a large number of authors and commentators in the text who lived before Dalhana.

The date of Dalhana's work is determined by his quoting Cakrapani (fl. 1060) and his being quoted by Hemadri (fl. 1260), placing him between the late 11th and the early 13th century.
