= Pasupati Bose =

Indian physician and academician

Pasupati Bose (1 November 1907 in Berhampore, West Bengal – 1979, in Kolkata) was an Indian physician and professor of anatomy.

== Information ==
Bose passed his Matriculation Exam in 1923 from Murshidabad Zilla School and ranked first. He never stood second in his school or college. He went to Kolkata (Calcutta) to study medicine. He received his MBBS and DM from the University of Calcutta in 1932. He not only received first rank, but also scored 968 out of 1000 which is a record which still (2007) stands. He was awarded several gold medals as a student. Bose joined the Kolkata Medical College as a professor of anatomy and gradually became the most famous and respected professor from his college. He married in 1938 and became a father of a son and a daughter.

In 1952, he went to the United States at the invitation of the Rockefeller Foundation. There he spent one year giving lectures in different American Universities. Subsequently, he was awarded the title of Fellow of the Royal Society, UK.

During the last five years of his service at the Kolkata Medical College, he became the Vice-Principal as per the request from his close associate and the Chief Minister of West Bengal of that time Dr. Bidhan Chandra Roy.

He died in 1979 at the age of 72. He will remain the ever remembered Professor of Anatomy of the Kolkata Medical College. Pasupati Bose Lane, a street in Kolkata, is named after him.
