= Madhusudan Gupta =

Indian physician

Pandit Madhusudan Gupta
- মধুসূদন গুপ্ত
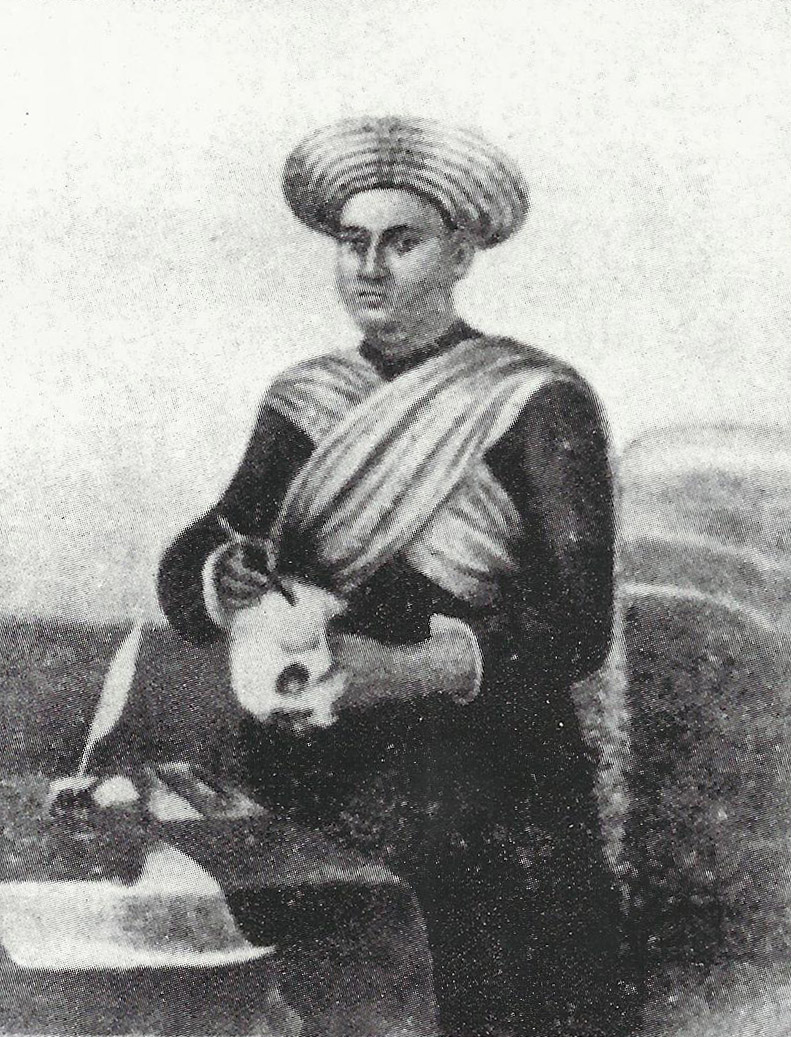
- Born: 1800; Baidyabati, Hooghly, Bengal Presidency, British India
- Died: 15 November 1856 (aged 55–56); Calcutta, Bengal Presidency, British India
- Education: Sanskrit College and University; Calcutta Medical College
- Occupation: Doctor
- Known for: First human dissection in India under Western medicine
- Medical career
- Institutions: Calcutta Medical College and Hospital
- Sub-specialties: Ayurveda, anatomy
- Research: Puberty
- Notable works: Translation of Anatomists Vade-mecum

Pandit Madhusudan Gupta (Bengali: মধুসূদন গুপ্ত) (1800 – 15 November 1856) was a Bengali Baidya translator and Ayurvedic practitioner who was also trained in Western medicine and is credited with having performed India's first human dissection at Calcutta Medical College (CMC) in 1836, almost 3,000 years after Susruta.

Born into a Baidya family, he studied Ayurvedic medicine at the Sanskrit College and progressed to teacher. Here, he began translations of a number of English texts into Sanskrit, including Hooper's Anatomists’ Ved-mecum. In addition, he attended anatomy and medicine lectures, becoming familiar with the developing clinical-anatomical medicine of Europe.

In 1835, he was transferred to the new CMC, where he was fundamental in gathering Indian support for practical anatomy and in breaking down Hindu taboos on touching the dead, consequently taking sole responsibility for the first human dissection, performed under the guidance of Professor Henry Goodeve and assisted by four other Hindu students. Controversies regarding the exact date of the first procedure, whether other students had performed it before and whether a military salute was given, remain. Despite any discrepancies, this singular act of dissection has become symbolic of the move of western medicine into India.

As a practitioner, he was successful and well regarded amongst his Indian contemporaries as well as by his European colleagues. In 1837, his involvement with the General Committee of the Fever Hospital and Municipal Improvements included recommendations for Kolkata's sanitation, a plead for better maternal care and a commendation to the smallpox vaccinators of Kolkata. His contributions to the research on puberty helped dismiss myths about the discrepancy of menarche between Indian and British women.

Gupta died from diabetic septicaemia in 1856, at the age of 56.

== Early life ==
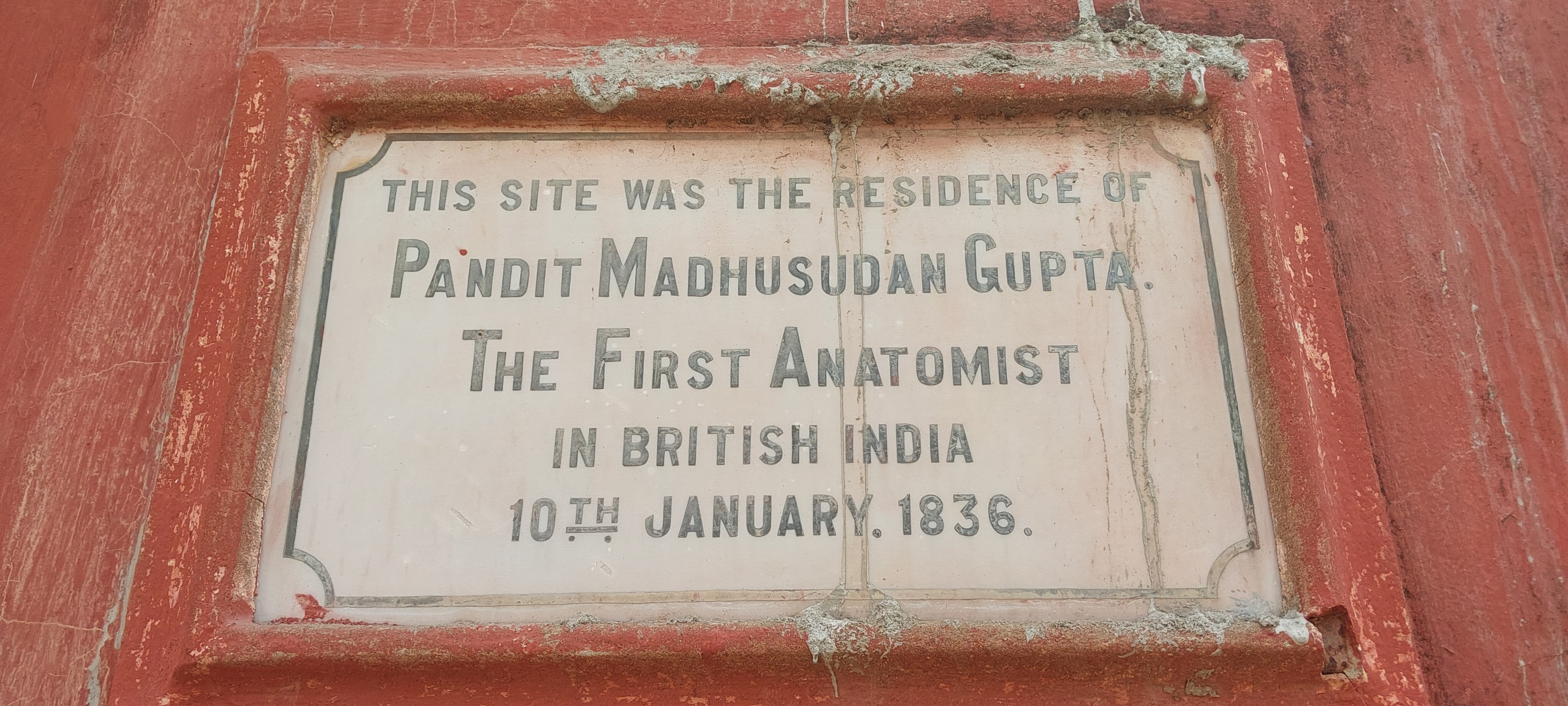
House of Madhusudan Gupta at Baidyabati

Madhusudan Gupta, also spelled in several other ways including Panndit Madusudden Gupta, Madhu Sudan Gupta, and Moodhoosooden Goopto, was born sometime in 1800 into a Baidya family, a traditional physician community, in Baidyabati, Hooghly. His grandfather was the family physician of Hooghly's Nawab and his great-grandfather was a Bakshi. Gupta rebelled against his father's wishes to pursue studies and left home during his early education. In December 1826, he gained admission to the Ayurvedic class of the Sanskrit College. What happened in the years between leaving home and entry to college is unclear.

== Early career ==
=== Sanskrit College ===
Gupta became a Sanskrit scholar and an Ayurvedic physician. In 1830, he was promoted from student to teacher at the Sanskrit College, a position he retained until January 1835. Initially, the promotion had caused an outcry among the students who boycotted his lessons.

During his time at the Sanskrit College, Gupta attended anatomy and medicine lectures given by Tytler and John Grant. After five years of doing so, he became their assistant.

=== Medical translations ===
It was also during his time at the Sanskrit College that he commenced his work on translations. Translating English into an ordinary Indian language or into a classical Indian language was not straightforward and caused much dilemma in how to transplant European science into India. Scholars were aware that it was impossible to simply wipe out what Indians had learnt over the centuries and swap them with Western theoretical structures. The most noted example of a debate on the subject was the dilemma around Hooper's book.

In 1834, Gupta was paid 1,000 rupees for translating Hooper's Anatomists’ Ved-mecum. It was completed under the title of Śärîravidyā ("Science of Things Relating to the Body") and was taken up for publication by the Asiatic Society, but was abandoned after page thirty-six, due to conflicting opinions on which language it was to be published in. It was following much discussion and the formation of a committee, that it was ultimately published in Sanskrit rather than Hindi.

=== Calcutta Medical College ===
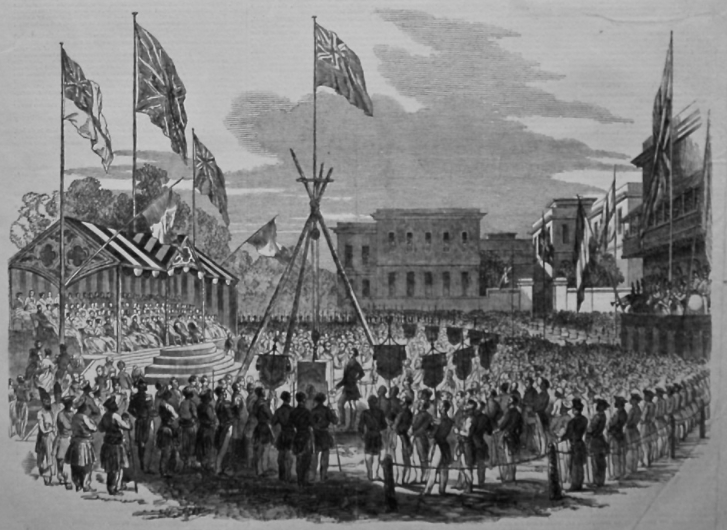
Foundation of the Medical College

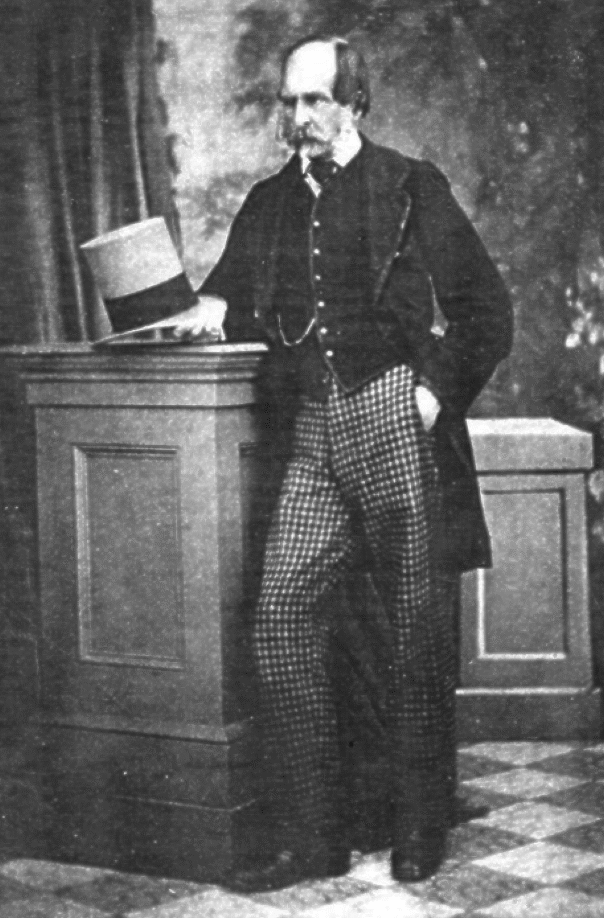
Henry Goodeve

A committee set up by the East India Company (EIC) in 1833, regarded the training of Kolkata's medical staff as unsatisfactory. As a consequence, the Ayurvedic and Yunani courses taught at the Sanskrit College and the School for Native Doctors’, both originally established by the EIC, were abolished. The plan was to replace them with a fully equipped Medical College, to educate and train the natives in "the art of healing". Newly founded in March 1835, Gupta was transferred to the CMC, as a native teacher, where he became involved in the execution of the first entrance examinations and where he also assisted Henry Goodeve and William Brooke O'Shaughnessy.

Subsequently, the first cohort consisted of just under fifty students who passed and commenced the course. However, the issue of anatomy dissection posed a problem for the course organisers.

== Introduction of anatomy ==
=== Background ===
The obstacles to the study of practical anatomy were not unique to India. England had its own qualms regarding acceptance of human dissection and difficulties in obtaining bodies. British anatomy students were increasingly looking to France for training and the emphasis on knowing the anatomy of the body, diseased or otherwise, on being a competent abled physician or surgeon was strongly felt by western medicine. This conviction, the 1834 report on the state of medical education in Bengal, along with the resulting formation of the CMC and its then affiliation with University College London, all played their part towards meeting the growing need of trained native doctors for a mounting British army. Adding to this, the persistence of Lord William Bentinck, Henry Goodeve and others and the surrounding abundant supply of dead bodies in Kolkata, created a passage for practical anatomy from Europe to India. All that was then needed was Indian acceptance.

=== The first human dissection ===
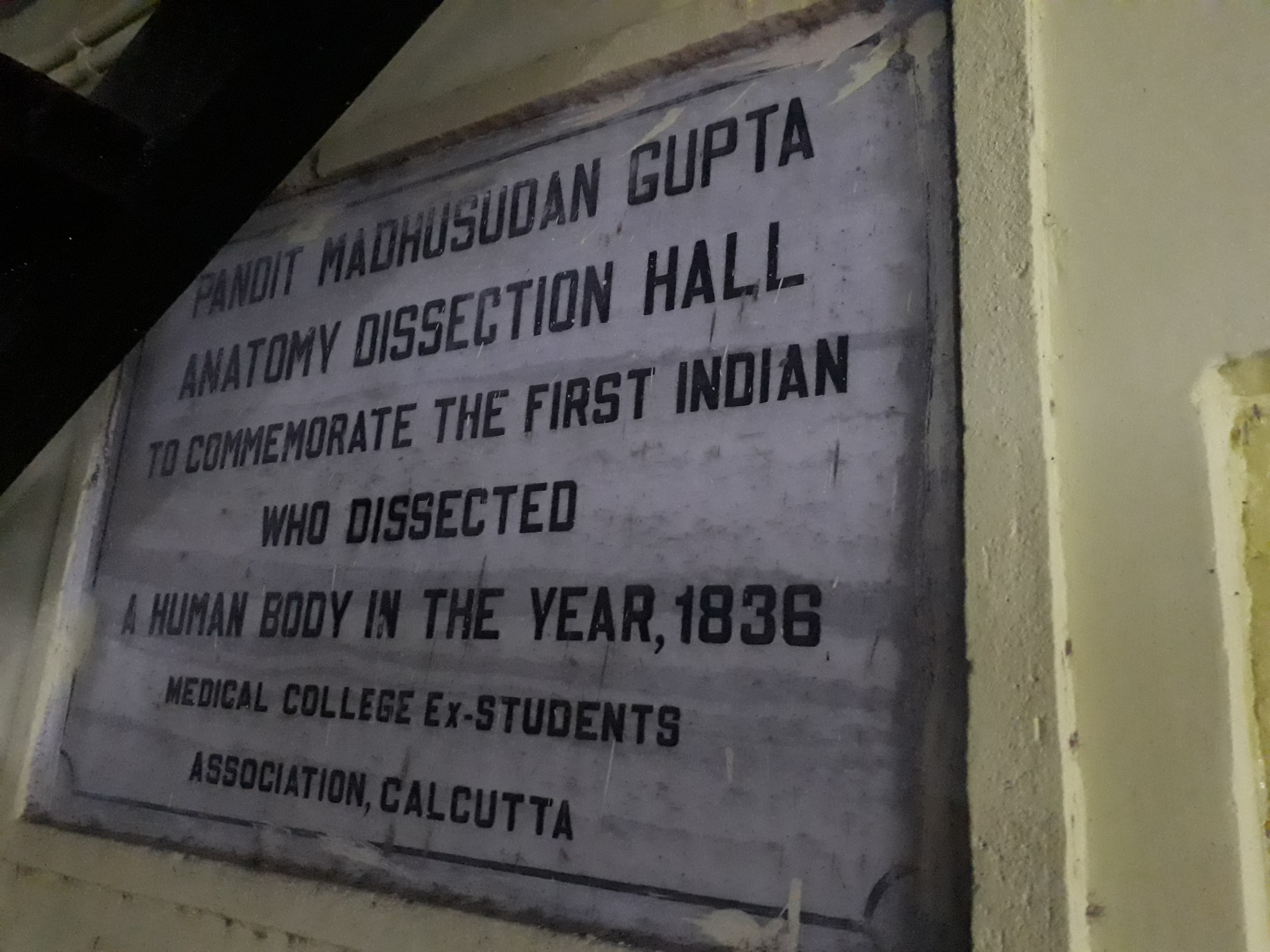
Plaques in the memory of first dissection in Calcutta Medical College

Widely acknowledged as the "first dissector of British India", Gupta has been frequently credited with the launch of modern medicine in India and breaking religious taboos. Hindu prejudice against touching the dead body was seen as a major obstacle in introducing practical anatomy to the college. In order for the influential Indian community to accept human dissection, Gupta was influenced by Drinkwater Bethune and requested by David Hare, who also sought advice from Radhakanta Deb, to produce the necessary supporting literary evidence from traditional Sanskrit Ayurvedic literature. Prior to human dissection, wax models were used as teaching aids. Gupta, as the principal native teacher, was instrumental in gathering support from traditional Sanskrit Ayurvedic literature in order to attain the approval to dissect a corpse.

Almost 3,000 years after Susruta, the appointed date of the landmark dissection epitomized the rising domination of western medicine. Although 10 January 1836 is frequently cited, this date is disputed and others have cited the date as 28 October 1836.

Following six months of preparation, persuasion by Bethune and with premeditated secrecy, Gupta followed Professor Goodeve to the Godown where, behind closed College gates the dead body of a child was prepared for dissection. He was assisted by four students, Umacharan Sett, Rajkrishna Dey, Dwarakanath Gupta and Nabin Chandra Mitra. Fourteen years later, Bethune described how "at the appointed hour, scalpel in hand, he [Madhusudan] followed Goodeve into the Godown" and after the first cut, "a long-gasping breath" came from the relieved on-lookers.

=== Response and controversy ===
To protect the students and the CMC authorities, Gupta took sole responsibility for the act which became hailed as a major victory for western civilisation, so far as to cite numerous doubtful references of a fifty-round salute from Calcutta's Fort William. Despite this, suspicion, reservation and resistance preoccupied western medicine in India and a deep aversion to dissection persisted amongst many Indians. Organised by the Lieutenant Governor of Bengal and Bethune, Gupta faced questions from an assembly of pundits, under the supervision of the Maharaja of Nabadwip. He was successful with his given evidence from Sanskrit scriptures and what followed was a steady progression of dissection at CMC over the coming years.

Indian entrepreneur, Dwarkanath Tagore, a firm supporter of Western medicine and the CMC, whilst a staunch believer against European prejudice to Indians, also actively encouraged the study of anatomy, being constantly present in the dissection rooms. Mittra, in his memoirs, also recounts Tagore being witness to a dissection when the anatomy class for Indian youths was opened. Original documents of the dissection, found at CMC in 2011, indicate that the influential Tagore may have had a hand in smuggling the corpse to the anatomy rooms.

In 1838, as a result of the rising public and medical interest in dissection and anatomy, the 'Society for the Acquisition of General Knowledge' was established by a group of Bengali youths.

To keep the event in memory, Bethune commissioned S. C. Belnos to paint a portrait of Gupta, complete with a skull in his left hand, depicting his object of study and to be hung in the CMC.

In 1848, Goodeve claimed that more 500 dissections had taken place at CMC in the previous year.

The question of whether Gupta's dissection was the actual first has been debated. In the 1830s, there was enough evidence to suggest that many Hindu students were ready to overcome prejudice and pick up a scalpel and "touch a dead body for the study of anatomy". In a personal statement in 1836, Gupta speaks of his major achievements, but does not mention the dissection.

Bramley comments in 1836, that many Hindu students had been interested in and observed the "examination of bodies" and he described a human dissection performed by four Hindu students on 28 October 1836. He discloses his wish to praise those students, but for the adverse publicity they would receive, he regretfully refrained.

An alternative account is given in 1899, when Professor of anatomy at CMC, Havelock Charles, wrote to the Lancet with regards to anatomy teaching at CMC. He described the credit and honour given to Gupta for the first dissection, despite

in 1835…the original class of eleven students who had the courage to break through the iron bonds of caste, and engage in the dissection of the human body. I think it but right to mention the names of the students of this first class that studied human anatomy in India…Umacharan Set, Dwarkanath Gupto, Rajkisto Dey, Gobind Chunder Goopto, Kallachand Dey, Gopalchander Gupto, Chummun Lal, Nobin Chunder Mitter, Nobin Chunder Mookerjee, Buddinchunder Chowdree, and James Pote.

== Later career ==
Following the first dissection, the college authorities requested that Gupta should complete formal medical qualifications to avoid any future student objections to being taught by a "mere kaviraja" or non-doctor. He received a medical degree in 1840.

=== General Committee of the Fever Hospital and Municipal Improvements ===
As a successful practitioner, well regarded amongst his Indian contemporaries as well as by his European colleagues, Gupta was called before the General Committee of the Fever Hospital and Municipal Improvements on 3 June 1836. Set up to improve the health situation of Kolkata, he gave evidence over four days.

He attributed the high maternal and neonatal mortality due to fever as owing to the dire state of the labour rooms. He therefore, appealed for better qualified affordable Hindu midwives and a well equipped lying-in hospital.

In addition, he became part of a smallpox commission set up in March 1850. Both variolation and vaccination against smallpox were used in India until 1850, when vaccination became the approved method by the smallpox commission. Gupta stated that an initial prejudice against vaccination had been overcome over the years and commended the Native vaccinators.

Naming the worst areas of Kolkata, he complained that crowded narrow streets with offensive drains where detrimental to health. He consequently pleaded for proper ventilation, drainage and water.

=== More translations ===
He translated the London pharmacopoeia of 1836 in Bengali, the Aushadh Kalpabali. This book gave "with the English, Latin and names the mode of preparation of Acids, Alkalis, Confections, Decoctions, Plasters, Infusions, Linimentts, Metals, Pills, Powders, Syrups, Tinctures, Ointments".

His skill and comprehension of the medical Shastras and familiarity and knowledge of Western science rendered him a reliable and invaluable aid when translating Hindu medical text. T. A. Wise was one such medical officer and translator who was guided by Gupta. Wise had translated Susruta's account of the types and usages of leeches. Gupta had, in addition, contributed a note on the medical uses of leeches in the Bengal Dispensatory.

=== Research ===
Dealing with the private matter of puberty, a topic not considered respectful to enquire about amongst conservative Hindu circles, Gupta proceeded to gather data in a quest to determine the average age of menarche among Hindu girls. In the mid-1840s, he acquired information on the puberty of Hindu wives of students at the college, data he then divulged to Goodeve, who in turn forwarded it to John Roberton and then finally found its way into Roberton's Essays and Notes on the Physiology and Diseases of Women, and on Practical Midwifery and his research into the discrepancy between puberty in India as compared to England.

The information supplied by Goodeve showed that where the average age of menarche was twelve years in a study of 90 cases in India, it was fourteen years in another study of over 2,000 cases from England. Roberton had felt that this difference presented a "physiological phenomena of a character peculiar, so far as is yet known, to the people of India". Gupta, in addition to Professor Webb, had cautioned that the discrepancy was likely due to "the consummation of marriage taking place in Bengal, as a rule, before the change which denotes puberty" and therefore some "are not real cases of puberty". Gupta had surveyed almost 130 Hindu girls, of which around 80 observed their first menstruation at the age of 12 and had their first sexual experience at the age of 9. Nearly 30 had given birth by the age of 14. Much of his career was subsequently spent devoted to maternal health and obstetrics.

=== Appointments ===
To resolve the dilemma of shortages of para-medical personnel, without putting up high hopes for Indians who were completing medical education at CMC, a para-medical class, also known as the "Military class" or "Hindustani class", was founded at the CMC in 1839. Taught in Hindi, it supplied army, but was not initially successful. Restructured around 1844, Gupta became its new superintendent (1845). In 1848, he was promoted to a first class sub-assistant surgeon. Another similar Bengali class was later established in 1852, with Gupta again appointed as its superintendent.

== Death and legacy ==
He developed diabetes mellitus and following a dissection, contracted an infection which led to gangrene of his hands. He subsequently died of septicaemia on 15 November 1856. The Calcutta National Medical College awards the "Pandit Madhusudan Gupta Memorial Lifetime Achievement Award" in anatomy, in his name.

== Selected publications ==
- Anatomy arthat Sharir Vidya in Bengali
- Translated London Pharmacopoeia in Bengali
- Translated Anatomist Vade Mecum in Sanskrit
- Chikista Sangraha.
- First printed edition of the Sushruta Samhita (2 vols, Calcutta 1835, 1836)
