= Ezra Hospital =

Hospital

Coordinates: 22°34′28″N 88°21′43″E

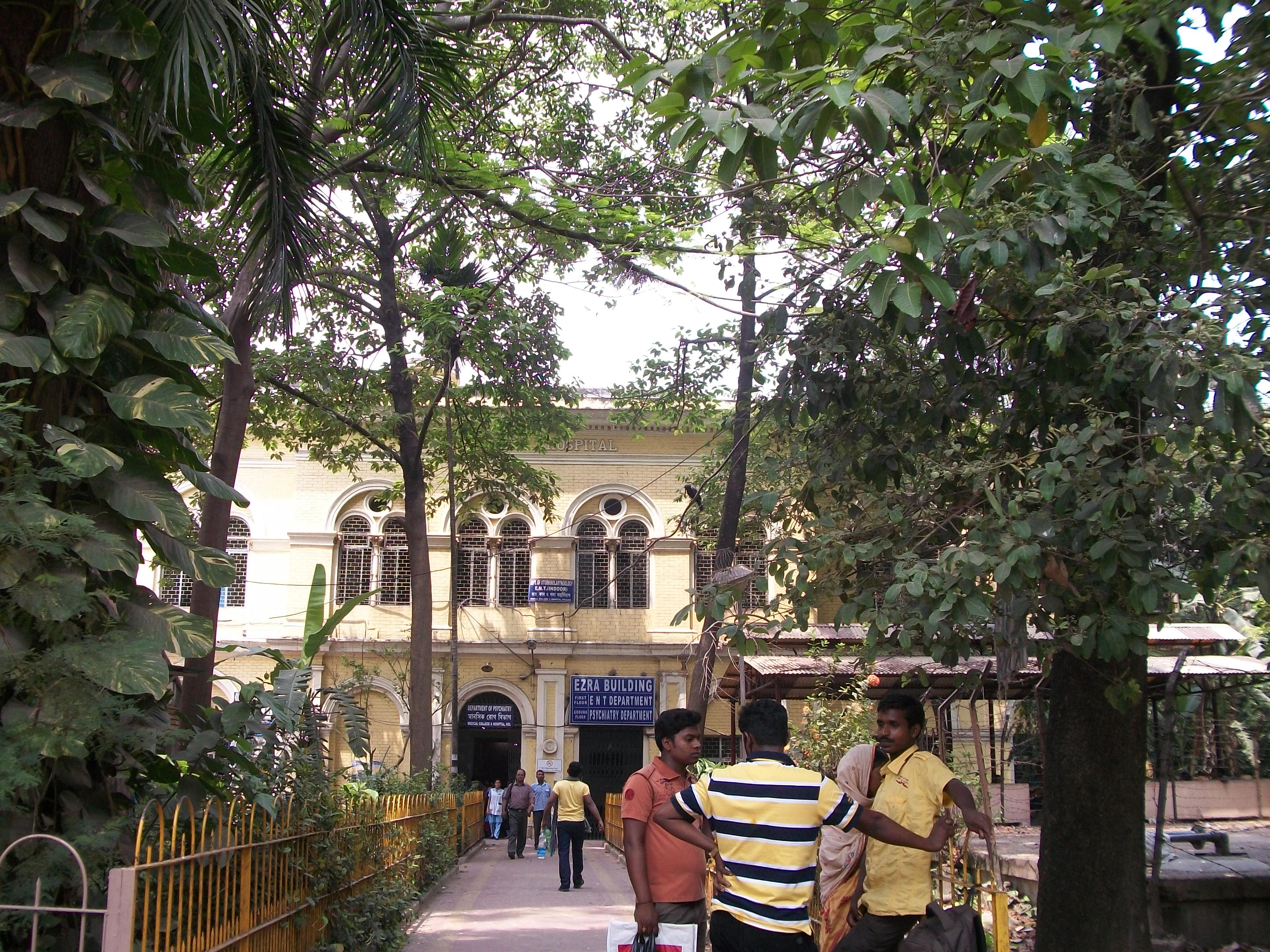
Ezra Hospital, Calcutta

The Ezra Hospital is a part of Medical College Kolkata.

== History ==
The Ezra Hospital was built through the munificence of Mrs. Mozelle E. D. J. Ezra. It was inaugurated in 1887. Still, patients were admitted from 9 April 1888. Initially, it was meant for the Jewish population of the city.

== Departments ==
At present, the Ezra Hospital houses the following departments of Calcutta Medical College:

- Department of ENT
- Department of Psychiatry
- Department of Chest medicine (Pulmonology)
- DOTS clinic
- Apex Referral Center for HIV/AIDS, the outdoor department where HIV and AIDS patients are referred from all over West Bengal.
