= Dwarkanath Gooptu =

Indian doctor (1818–1882)

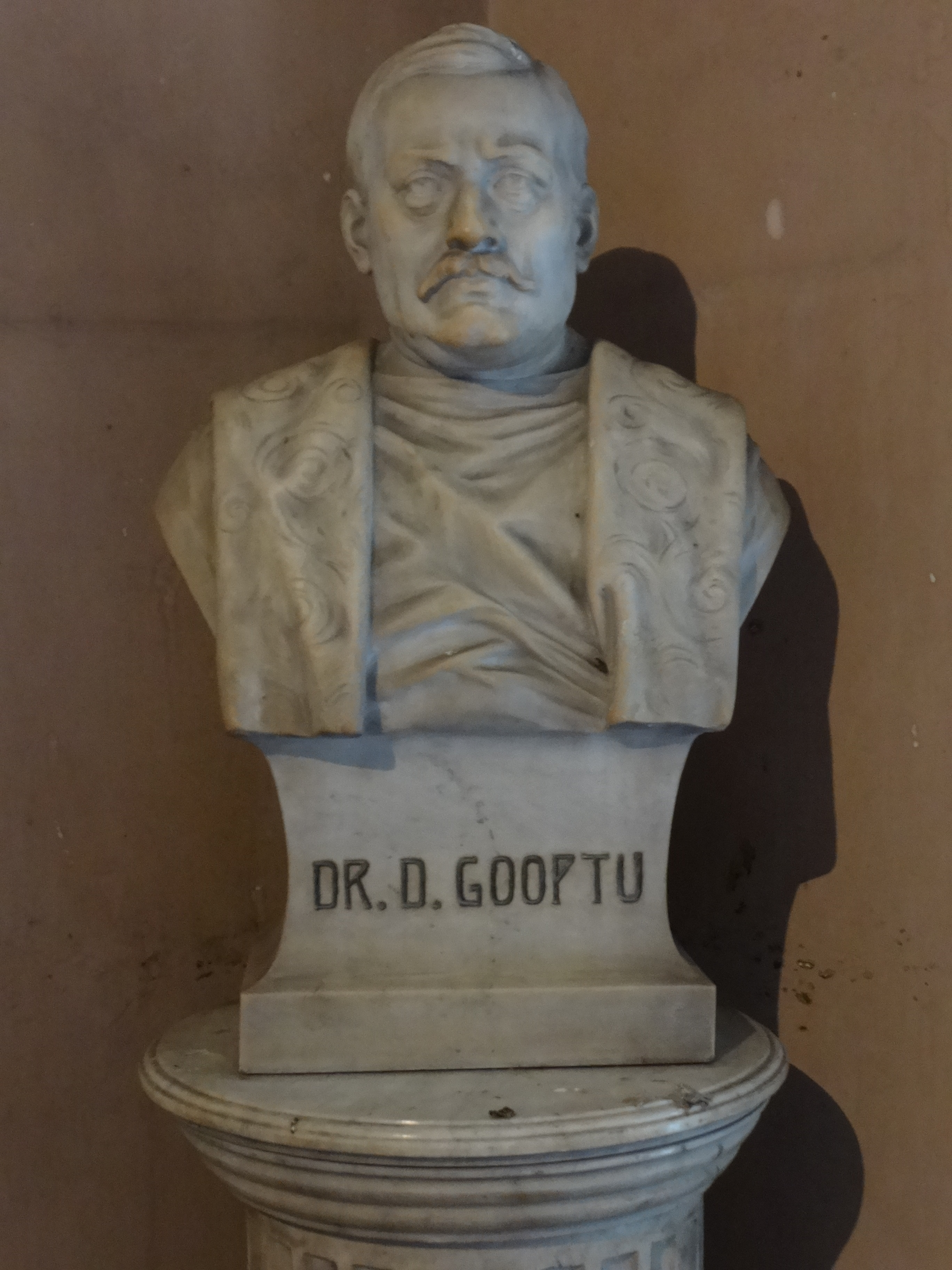
- Dr. D Gooptu, Marble sculpture
- Born: 1818; Calcutta, Bengal, British India
- Died: 1882 (aged 63–64); Calcutta, Bengal, British India
- Occupation: Doctor
- Known for: Invented and patented medicine for malarial fever, founder of D. Gooptu and Co-the first Bengalee doctor to start a dispensary of western medicine in Calcutta.
- Children: Gopal Chandra Gooptu, Ram Chandra Gooptu and Nandalal Gooptu
- Parent: Brindaban Chandra Gupta

Dr. Dwarkanath Gooptu GMCB (Bengali দ্বারকানাথ গুপ্ত, 1818–1882) was an Indian medical doctor. He was one of the earliest practitioners of western medicine in Calcutta to have graduated from Bengal Medical College. He later went on to invent and patent an anti-pyretic mixture prescribed to patients with malarial fever. He was among the earliest Vaidyas trained in the science of western medicine. He founded Messrs. D. Gooptu and Co. at the age of twenty-two and turned it into one of the most successful business enterprises in British India

== Early life ==
Dr. D Gooptu was the son of Brindaban Chandra Gupta who had considerable landed property in and around Calcutta. Dr. D Gooptu was one of the favourite students of David Hare and was educated under his care at the Hare School in Calcutta. Debendranath Tagore was his contemporary at the school. When the Medical College of Bengal was established in June 1835, he was admitted as one of the first four foundation students. He assisted Madhusudan Gupta in carrying out the first human dissection in modern India and Asia. Having passed his final examination on 2 February 1839 he was appointed by the Honourable East India Company as medical officer in one of the north-western towns but as he was inclined towards independent practice, he refused the post. Prince Dwarkanath Tagore had a dispensary of traditional Ayurvedic medicine at 13, Esplanade Road and entrusted Dr Gooptu to practice from there. He soon became family physician to Prince Dwarka Nath Tagore who introduced him to other well-to-do families in Calcutta, and thus at the age of twenty-two he began his career as a medical practitioner, becoming the family physician to all the Tagore households.

== Messrs. D. Gooptu & Co ==
In 1840 the first indent of Messrs. D. Gooptu & Co. was written by Sir William Brook O'Shaughnessy the then professor of chemistry at the Medical College. The firm owned the first known dispensary of English drugs in India which was started by a Bengalee doctor. The business grew rapidly in succeeding years and in 1871 D. Gooptu became the sole proprietor of the company carrying it on until 1882, when he died, leaving the business in the hands of his three sons who continued the business until 1913, when the second son Mr R C Gooptu died. The flagship product of the company was the patented anti-pyretic mixture, commonly known as "D. Gooptu Tonic," which was the specific medicine prescribed for all kinds of fever and malarial fever and it had perhaps one of the largest sales among patented medicines in British India. There is a mention of the patented 'D.Gooptu' medicine in 'Sri Sri Ramakrishna Kathamritha' where he describes Dr Gooptu work as something which brings quick relief compared to traditional medicine; He uses the analogy to highlight the importance of path of devotion i.e. Bhakti yoga in times of Kali Yuga or 'age of vice' compared to the path of ritualistic action i.e. Karma yoga. It is also mentioned that when Ramakrishna had malarial fever in 1879–80, he got relief from the fever after having the medicine as traditional ayurvedic medicines were not effective.

Dr D. Gooptu's proximity to the British also helped him to export his products to Africa and the business was transacted at 369, Upper Chitpore Road and 13, Esplanade Row East, Calcutta.

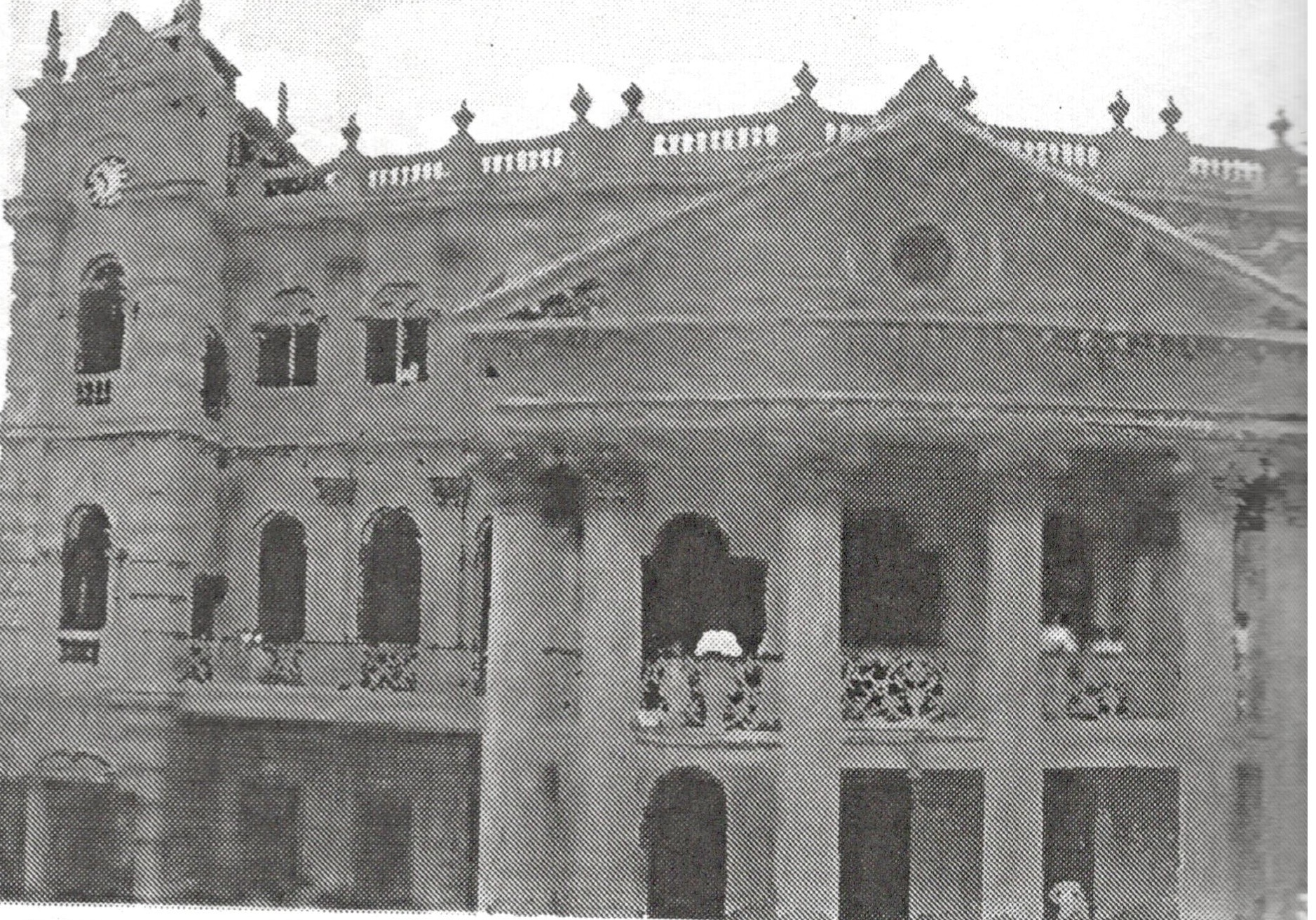
Gopal Chandra Gooptu residence

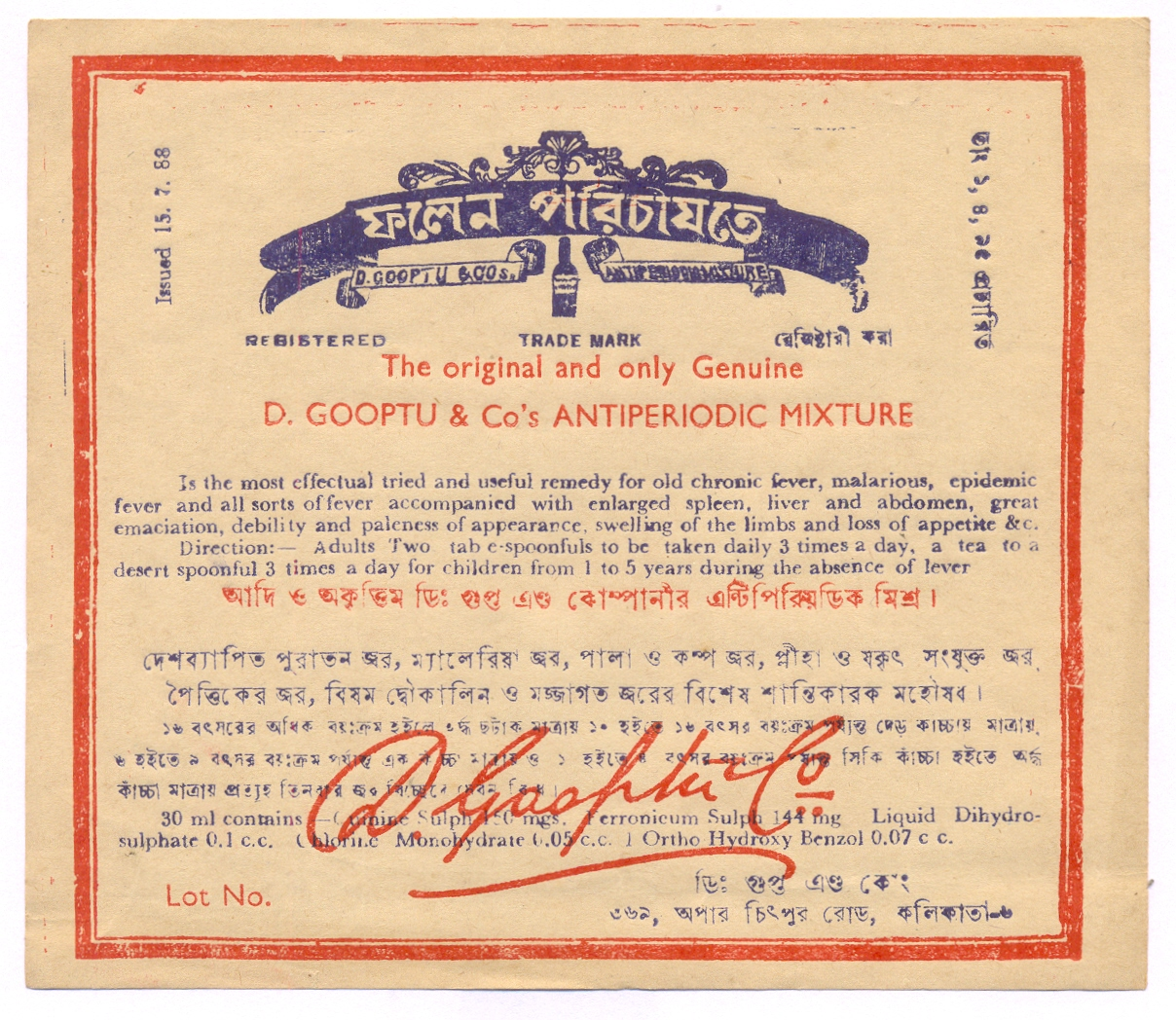
The Label used on the medicine bottle.

Replica of the medicine bottle 'D.Gooptu'

Apart from the anti-pyretic mixture, there were several other proprietary medicines of the firm, the names of which are:-

1. Anti-pyretic mixture "Falena Parichiyata"
2. Spleen and liver ointment
3. Special liver mixture for all kinds of ailment of that organ
4. Diarrhoea and dysentery pills
5. liver-purging pills.
6. Essence of Jamaica Sarsaparilla

== Family Deity ==
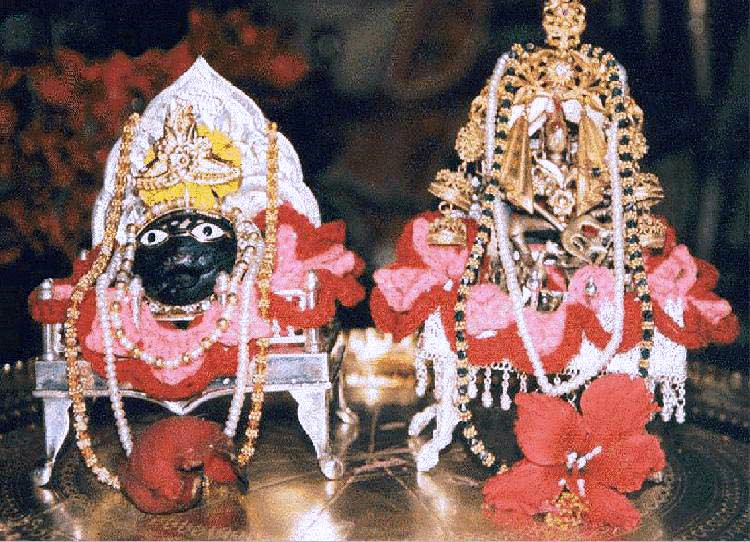
The Family Deity

The first ancestor of the 'Gooptu's' who came and settled down in Calcutta was Ramaram Goswami and became the one in charge of the temple of Madan Mohan. His son, Laksminarayan, who was also learned, continued to be in charge of the temple after his father's demise. Laxminarayan had two son's Jaganath and Kriparam. One night, Jagganath, who became a sanyas had a dream about a deity-Goddess Durga and following his dream, he wanted to create an idol out of the image which he dreamt, and thus set forth to create the Astadhatu (eight metals) figure of the deity through a particular ritual known as the pranpratishtha puja. This four and a half inch figure of Singhabahini, forged out of eight metals 'astadhatu' is the Kuladevata (family deity) and still remains with the clan and each branch of the family take turns to perform pujas throughout the year. This ritual has been carried on for over three hundred years.
