= Sushruta =

Ancient Indian physician and surgeon

Maharshi Pandit Sushruta
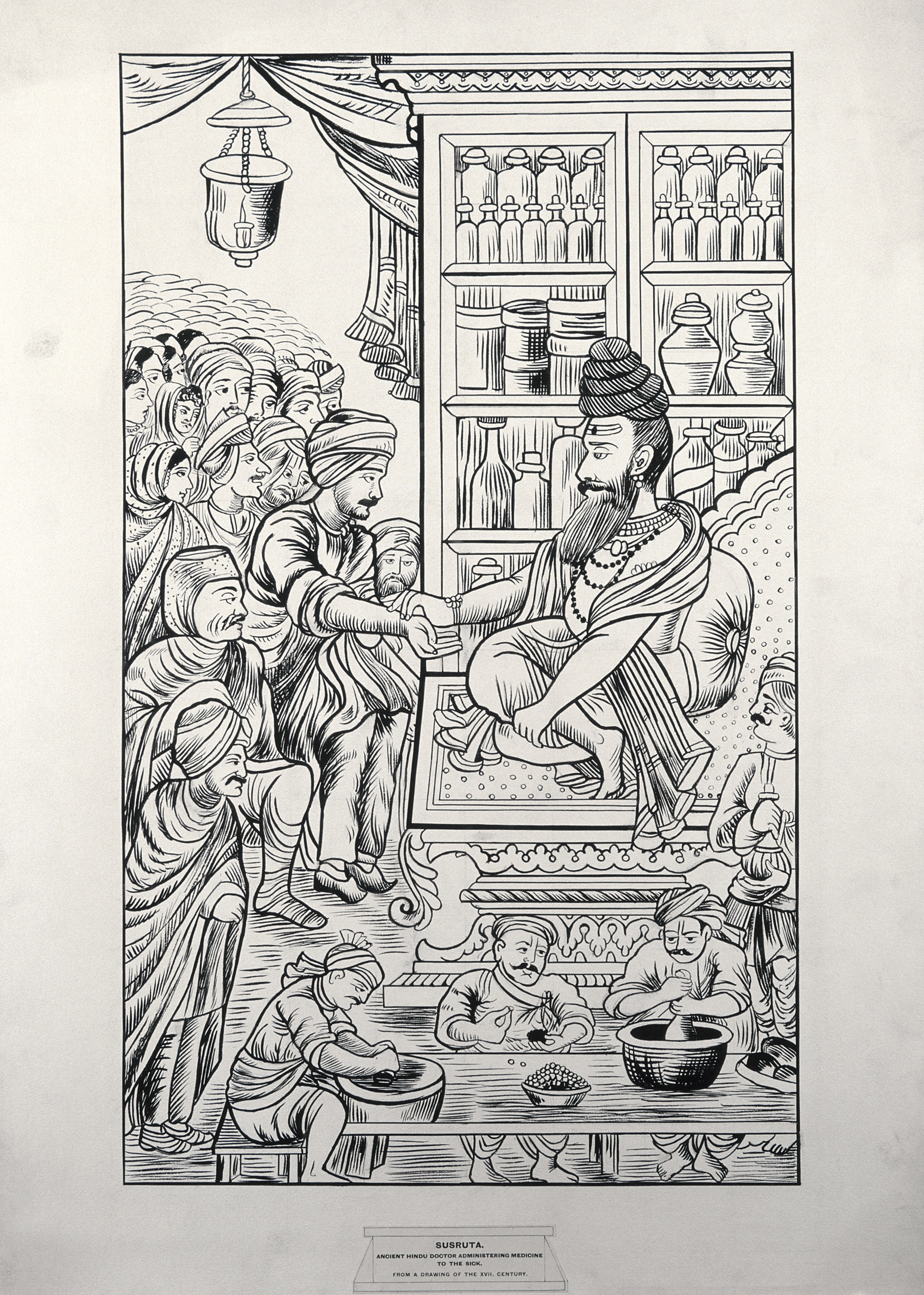
- 17th-century sketch of Sushruta
- Born: Sushruta c. early-mid 1st millennium BCE; Kanyakubja
- Died: mid 1st millennium BCE; Varanasi
- Body discovered: Cremated
- Occupation: Medical doctor
- Known for: Author of Sushruta Samhita

Academic background
- Education: Benares University

Academic work
- Discipline: Medicine; Dentistry; Obstetrics and gynaecology
- Sub-discipline: Ayurveda
- Institutions: Banaras University

Suśruta (Sanskrit: सुश्रुत, lit. 'well heard', IAST: Suśruta) was an ancient Indian physician and surgeon, who made significant contributions to the field of plastic and cataract surgery. He is widely considered "the father of plastic surgery" and is credited with developing the method of reconstructive rhinoplasty, historically known as the "Indian method". He was the author of the Suśruta Saṃhitā (Suśruta's Compendium), considered to be one of the most important surviving ancient treatises on medicine. (Note: The Samhitas represent later revised versions (recensions) of their original works.) It is also considered a foundational text of Ayurveda. The treatise addresses all aspects of general medicine, including diet, surgery, nosology, anatomy, developmental biology, therapeutics, toxicology, paediatrics and other subjects. The inclusion of particularly impressive and historically important chapters on surgery has wrongly led some to believe that this is the work's primary focus. The treatise consists of 186 chapters.

Acharya Sushruta was born in Kanyakubja and he later moved to Varanasi, where he wrote The Compendium of Suśruta.

== Authorship ==
The printed editions of the work normally contain the phrase "as Lord Dhanvantari declared" (Sanskrit यथोवाच भगवान्धन्वन्तरिः) at the start of each chapter, framing the work as Dhanvantari's discourse. However, the earliest manuscripts of the work omit this attribution, framing the work instead as the work of Divodāsa, king of Varanasi.

Rao in 1985 suggested that the author of the original "layer" was "elder Sushruta" (Vrddha Sushruta), although this name appears nowhere in the early Sanskrit literature. The text, stated Rao, was redacted centuries later "by another Sushruta, then by Nāgārjuna, and thereafter a later collection of chapters called the Uttara-tantra was added as a supplement". It is now generally accepted by scholars that there were several ancient authors who contributed to this text.

The translator G. D. Singhal called Suśruta "the father of plastic surgery" on account of the detailed accounts of surgery in the work as well as the now passée style of attributing metaphorical fatherhood to male innovators.

== Date ==
Modern scholarship generally places the composition of the Sushruta Samhita between the 1st millennium BCE, although the surviving Sushruta Samhita is a composite text compiled and revised over time. The early scholar Rudolf Hoernle proposed that some concepts from the Suśruta-Saṃhitā could be found in the Śatapatha-Brāhmaṇa, which he dated to the 600 BCE. However, during the last century, scholarship on the history of Indian medical literature has advanced substantially, and firm evidence has accumulated that the Suśruta-saṃhitā is a work of several historical layers. Its composition may have begun in the last centuries BCE, completed in its present form by another author who redacted its first five chapters and added the long, final chapter, the "Uttaratantra". It is likely that the Suśruta-saṃhitā was known to the scholar Dṛḍhabala, a contributor to the Charaka Samhita that wrote between the fourth and fifth centuries CE. Additionally, several ancient Indian authors used the name "Suśruta", resulting in potential misattribution.

== Citations ==
In 1907, Kunja Lal Bhishagratna, a translator of the Suśrutasaṃhitā, asserted that Suśruta was one of the sons of the sage Vishvamitra. Bhisagratna also asserted that Sushruta was the name of the clan to which Vishvamitra belonged. In Chapter 7 of the five-volume History of Indian Medical Literature, published in 1999, physician-scholar Gerrit Jan Meulenbeld covers a variety of further theories on Suśruta's identity and the Sushruta Samhita's dating and publication history.

The name Suśruta is listed as one of ten Himalayan sages in a treatise on medicinal garlic that was included in the sixth century CE Bower Manuscripts. This is likely derived from the origin story at the start of the Suśrutasaṃhitā that makes this statement.

== Training ==
Sushruta attracted a number of disciples and required to study for six years before beginning hands-on surgical training. After the students had been accepted by Sushruta, he would instruct them in surgical procedures by having them practice cutting on vegetables or dead animals to perfect the length and depth of an incision. Once students had proven themselves capable with vegetables, animal corpses, or with soft or rotting wood – and had carefully observed actual procedures on patients – they were then allowed to perform their own surgeries. These students were trained by their master in every aspect of the medical arts, including anatomy. Sushruta laid down rules for keeping surgical instruments and the operating environment clean. He specified that instruments should be made out of metals such as iron and copper, and kept clean and sharp, tempered with alkalis, water or oil. He also recommended fumigating the operating room, labour ward and recovery ward with the smoke of guggulu, vacha, white mustard, rock salt and neem leaves.

== The Suśrutasaṃhitā on medicine and physicians ==
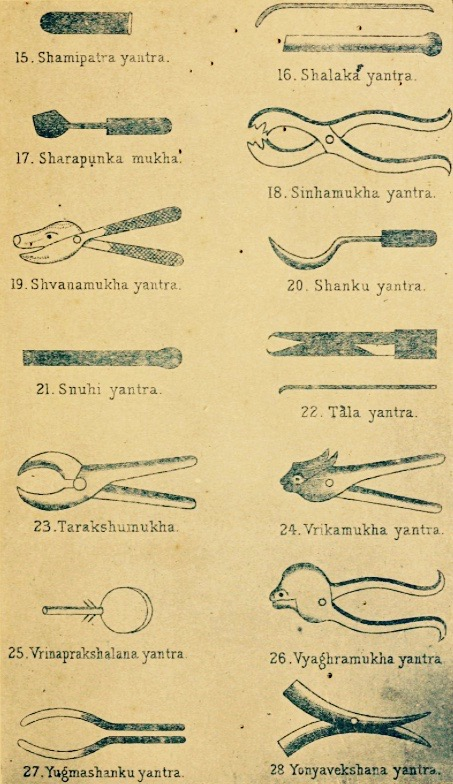
Publisher's reconstruction of some of the surgical instruments described in the Suśrutasaṃhitā. From K. L. Bhishagratna, An English Translation of the Sushruta Samhita in Three Volumes (Calcutta, 1907), v.1, after p. LXVII.

The Compendium of Suśruta (Suśrutasaṃhitā) is an instruction manual for physicians, in this way:

That person alone is fit to nurse, or to attend the bedside of a patient, who is cool-headed and pleasant in his demeanor, does not speak ill of anyone, is strong and attentive to the requirements of the sick, and strictly and indefatigably follows the instructions of the physician. (I.34)

== Legacy ==
Sushruta's medical prowess is exhibited through his writings on rhinoplasty, involving nasal reconstructions using skin from the patient's forehead or cheek, often for criminals punished with amputations. Based on reports in the October 1794 edition of The Gentleman's Magazine, published in London, Indians maintained Sushruta's surgical practices until the late 18th century. Sushruta is credited with an early diagnostic observation related to diabetes (madhumeha), describing the sweetness of urine as an indicator of the disease, a condition historically associated with urine attracting ants.[citation needed]

The bronze statue in honor of Sushruta was unveiled at the Royal College of Surgeons of Edinburgh in July 2026.

== See also ==
- Dhanvantari
- Vagbhata
- Charaka
