= Gerrit Jan Meulenbeld =

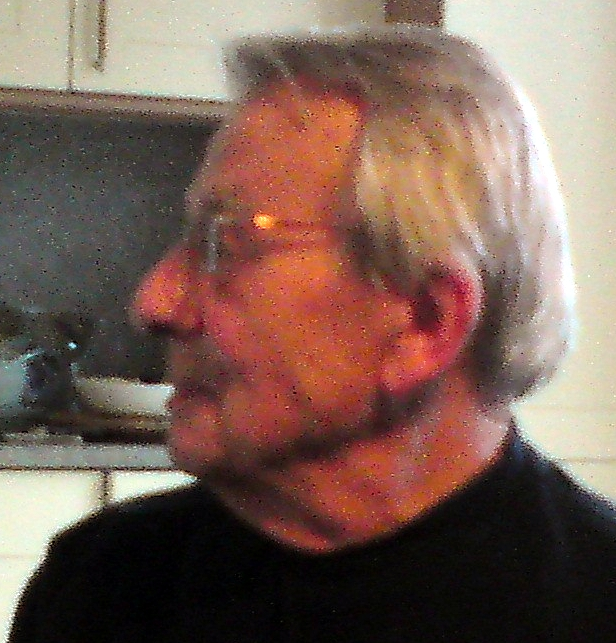
- Gerrit Jan Meulenbeld in 2009
- Born: May 28, 1928
- Died: March 26, 2017 (aged 88); Groningen, Netherlands
- Citizenship: Dutch
- Occupations: University professor of Sanskrit and psychiatrist
- Known for: Historian of medicine
- Notable work: A History of Indian Medical Literature (1999-2002)

Gerrit Jan Meulenbeld (28 May 1928 – 26 March 2017) was a Dutch physician-scholar who taught and published major works of research in Indology. He specialized in the history of Indian medicine (Ayurveda). Throughout his scholarly career he also maintained a practice as a psychiatrist.

== Education and professional life ==
Meulenbeld was born in Borne, Overijssel. He studied medicine, and Indology under Jan Gonda, at Utrecht University. From 1954 he worked as a psychiatrist. At the end of the nineteen-sixties he returned to Indology. Immediately after receiving his doctorate in Sanskrit, Meulenbeld began to write the historical overview of the Indian medical literature. From 1978 he worked as associate professor of Indology at the University of Groningen and as a psychiatrist at the Van Mesdagkliniek also in Groningen. In 1986 accepted a full-time job at the Van Mesdagkliniek when the Institute of Indic Languages and Cultures of the University of Groningen was closed as part of a Dutch policy of retrenchment in the study of Asian cultures.. He worked at the Van Mesdagkliniek until his retirement in 1988.

A detailed obituary by Hans Bakker appeared in the Indo-Iranian Journal (2018).

== Awards ==
In 1990, Prof. Meulenbeld received the Basham Medal from the International Association for the Study of Traditional Asian Medicine The medal is awarded "in recognition of special contributions by IASTAM members to promoting the Association’s goals, such as outstanding studies in the social and cultural history of traditional Asian medicine."

In 2002, Prof. Meulenbeld was made a Knight of the Order of the Lion of the Netherlands. With this award, the Dutch Crown honoured his lifelong contributions to the medical history of India, and the publication of the final volume of his History of India Medical Literature, that was presented at the award ceremony at the University of Groningen.

In 2011 the Arya Vaidya Pharmacy, a leading centre of ayurvedic practice, education and industry, bestowed the title Yavanacharya of Ayurveda on Prof. Meulenbeld on the occasion of an International Grand Centennial Convention.

== Works ==
Meulenbeld's book-length monographs include:

- Mahādevadeva’s Hikmatprakāśa: a Sanskrit treatise on Yūnānī medicine. Part I: text and commentary of Section I with an annotated English translation; Part II: selected passages from text and commentaries of Section II with an annotated English translation. eJIM 5,2. Groningen, 2012. Part III: text and commentary of selected verses from Section III with an annotated English translation. eJIM 6,2. Groningen, 2013.
- The śītapitta group of disorders (urticaria and similar syndromes) and its development in Āyurvedic literature from early times to the present day, Eelde-Groningen (Supplements to eJIM 3), Groningen, 2010. URL
- The trees called śigru (Moringa sp.), along with a study of the drugs used in errhines, Eelde-Groningen (Supplements to eJIM 1), Groningen, 2009.
- History of Indian Medical Literature, Groningen Oriental Studies No.15, Vol.1-3, Groningen, 1999–2002.
- Madhavanidāna: English translation with principal commentaries chapters 1-10; Leiden: Brill, 1974. Reprinted Delhi, 2008

and his publications also extend over many scholarly articles.

Meulenbeld's doctoral thesis under Prof. Jan Gonda was a translation of the first ten chapters of the Madhavanidāna, Sanskrit treatise on nosology, together with its Sanskrit commentaries, the Madhukośaṭīkā and the Āṭaṅkadarpaṇa. It was published in 1974, and reprinted in Delhi in 2008. The index of technical terms appended to Madhavanidāna translation is one of its unique features.

Meulenbeld also created and maintained the online Annotated bibliography of Indian Medicine.

=== A History of Indian Medical Literature ===
His major work, the five-volume publication The History of Indian Medical Literature (Groningen, 1999–2002) is of foundational value for scholars of Ayurveda as well as those studying Sanskrit, Indian philosophy, anthropology and medical history. It has transformed the study of Indian medical history, placing it on a more secure historical basis than ever before and bringing into critical view thousands of medical treatises that were formally unknown to historical scholarship. Meulenbeld began work on his History at the invitation of his professor, Jan Gonda, who sought his work as a contribution to the books he was commissioning and editing for the multi-volume A History of Indian Literature. Gonda imposed strict page limits on his contributors. When Meulenbeld's work began to exceed these limits, his friends and colleagues, especially Prof. Ronald E. Emmerick, encouraged Meulenbeld to continue writing and to ignore the limits of the Gonda series. This he did, and three decades later his monumental work was published in the Groningen Oriental Series.

The volumes cover a time-frame of over two millennia, from the Vedic period to the early twentieth century. The work covers Sanskrit treatises as well as Pali and Prakrit works by Buddhists and Jains. It also covers some of the recent works in Hindi and also the Ayurvedic tradition of nearby island nation, Sri Lanka.

== Personal life ==
Jan Meulenbeld was married to Hannie Zwaan (1933-2019), to whom he dedicated the volumes of his History of Indian Literature with the affectionate phrase in English, Latin and Sanskrit: "To Hannie uxori carae पतिव्रतायै".
