= Medical College & Hospital, Kolkata =

Public medical college and tertiary teaching hospital in Kolkata, West Bengal, India

Medical College and Hospital, Kolkata
- Former name: Medical College Bengal
- Motto: Cum Humanitate Scientia (Latin)
- Motto in English: Humanity and Science
- Type: Public Medical College & Hospital
- Established: 28 January 1835; 191 years ago
- Founder: Lord William Bentinck
- Accreditation: NMC; INC
- Academic affiliations: West Bengal University of Health Sciences
- Budget: ₹464.61 crore (US$48 million) (FY2024–25 est.)
- Principal: Dr. Indranil Biswas
- Faculty: 234
- Students: 1,906
- Undergraduates: 1,250
- Postgraduates: 646
- Doctoral students: 22
- Location: 88, College Street, Kolkata, West Bengal, 700001, India; 22°34′25″N 88°21′43″E
- Campus: 26 acres (11 ha); Metropolis
- Website: www.medicalcollegekolkata.in
- Government of West Bengal

Organisation
- Type: Teaching hospital
- Affiliated university: West Bengal University of Health Sciences

Services
- Standards: NMC
- Emergency department: Level II Trauma Center
- Beds: 2,230

Helipads
- Helipad: No

The Medical College Kolkata (MCK), also known as Calcutta Medical College, is a public medical college and hospital in Kolkata, West Bengal, India. Established in 1835 by Lord William Bentinck, it is one of the oldest medical colleges in Asia offering education in modern medicine.

== History ==
The medical college was established in 1835, classes began on 1 June of that year. Dr. Mountford Joseph Bramley was the first superintendent of the college. Apart from Dr. Bramley and Dr. Goodeve, there were two other native teachers, Madhusudan Gupta and Nabakrishna Gupta, both educated in Western medicine. Madhusudan Gupta is famous in history as the 'first Indian to perform dissection' in the medical college. Initially, students were admitted to the college through an examination. Most of the one hundred candidates were from Hare School, Hindu College, Scotch Assembly School (now Scottish Church Collegiate School). A total of 49 people were admitted as 'foundation students'.

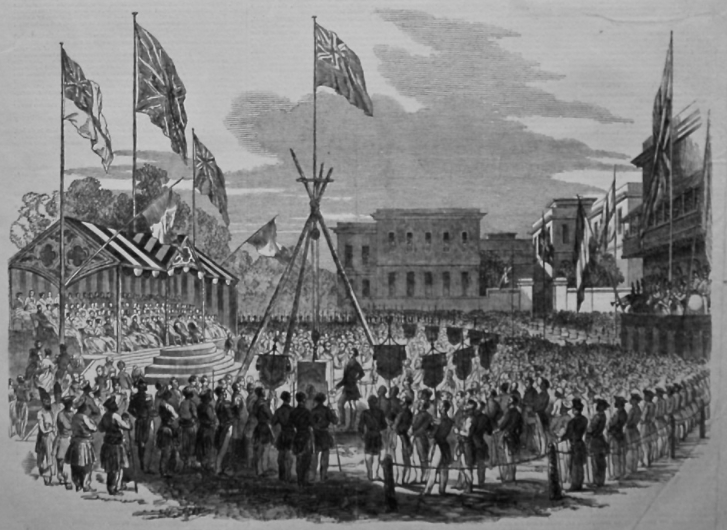
Foundation of the MCK laid by the Earl of Dalhousie

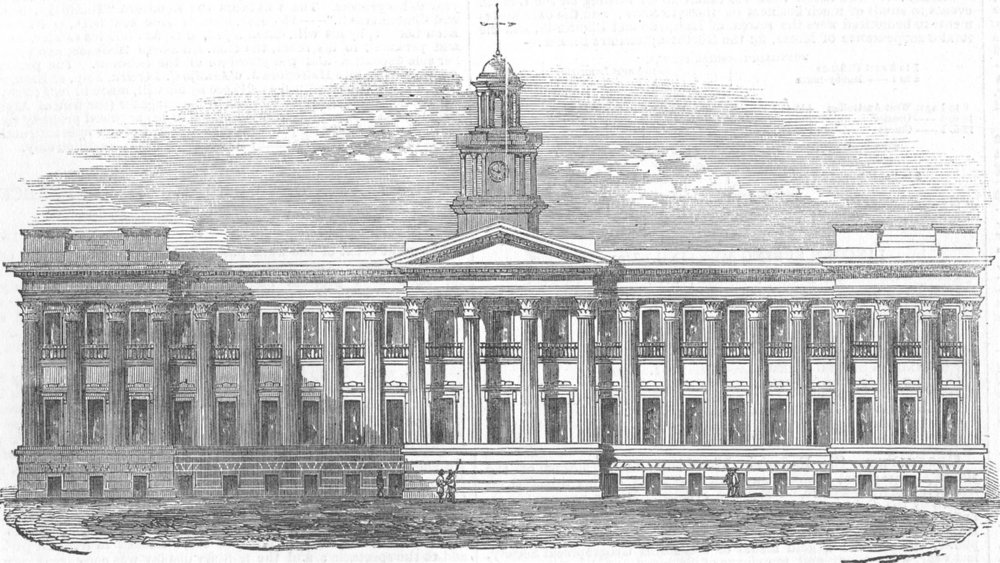
MCK building in 1835, as illustrated by London News

== Politics ==
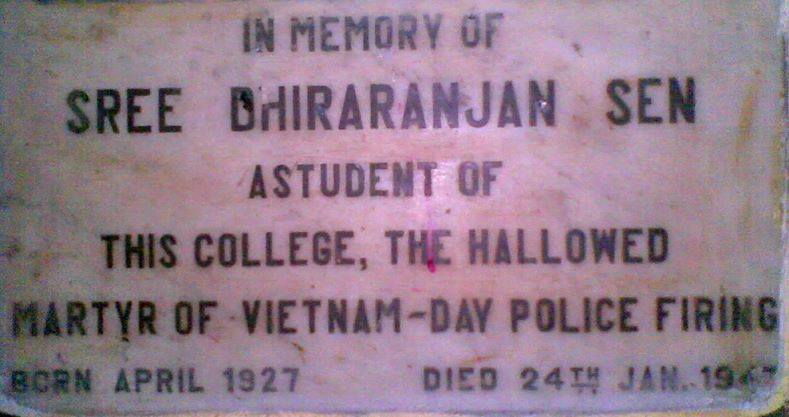
Plaque in memory of Sree Dhiraranjan Sen

Student politics is rooted in tradition, with many students participating in the Indian freedom struggle. Anti-British movements were implemented with the programmes of Bengal Provincial Students' Federation (BPSF), the Bengal branch of All India Students' Federation. Student politics was initially focused on the independence of India. In 1947, Sree Dhiraranjan Sen, a student of the college, died during a Vietnam Day police firing. The Vietnam Students’ Association passed a resolution in its Hanoi session in memory of Sen in March 1947.

Student politics were highly influenced by the partition of Bengal and communal riots during and after the partition of India. Between 1946 and 1952, the college's doctors stood for communal harmony and worked hard in the refugee colonies. During 1952, ex-students of the college, among them Bidhan Chandra Roy who became the second Chief Minister of West Bengal, established the Students' Health Home for the welfare of students.

From the 1950s to the 1970s, the college became a centre of leftist and far-left politics. Student politics was highly influenced by the Naxalbari uprising in the early 1970s.

== Rankings ==
University and college rankings

Medical – India
- NIRF (2024): 44

Medical College, Kolkata was ranked 41st among Medical Institutions by National Institutional Ranking Framework (NIRF) in 2025.

== Achievements ==
In February 2023, Dr. Sudip Das, a professor of ENT Department from the institution, gets a patent for developing a simple and innovative device.

In December 2024 institutions has been recognized as the best medical college in Eastern India by the Indian Council of Medical Research (ICMR), achieving a score of 70%. This acknowledgment highlights MCHK's excellence in research and overall performance, boosting its reputation and the standard of medical education in the region.

== Notable alumni ==
- Bidhan Chandra Roy, noted physician and the 2nd Premier of West Bengal and 1st Chief Minister of West Bengal
- Lamu Amatya, First Nepalese nurse
- Pasupati Bose, Indian physician and professor of anatomy
- Upendranath Brahmachari, discoverer of the treatment of Kala-azar
- Aroup Chatterjee, British Indian atheist physician, author of Mother Teresa: The Untold Story
- Nirmal Kumar Dutta, Shanti Swarup Bhatnagar Prize winner (1965) and the Director of Haffkine Institute
- Lionel Emmett, member of the Indian field hockey team in the 1936 Summer Olympics
- Subhendu Chatterjee, film actor and physician
- Muhammad Ibrahim, former Principal of Sir Salimullah Medical College
- Sri Yukteshwar Giri, Indian Yogi
- Dipyaman Ganguly, Shanti Swarup Bhatnagar Prize winner (2022)
- Kadambini Ganguly, the first certified South Asian female physician qualified for Western medical practice
- Madhusudan Gupta, the first Indian trained in Western medicine to dissect a human corpse.
- David Hare, founder of Hare School
- K. B. Hedgewar, also known as Doctorji, was the founding Sarsanghachalak of the Rashtriya Swayamsevak Sangh.
- Vikram Marwah, Padma Shri awardee, conferred Dr. B. C. Roy Award by the President of India
- Nurul Islam, National Professor of Bangladesh
- Kamaleshwar Mukherjee, filmmaker
- Balai Chand Mukhopadhyay
- N. C. Paul, first physician to examine yoga
- Sisir Kumar Bose, noted paediatrician, nephew of Subhas Chandra Bose and son of Sarat Chandra Bose
- Sharadwat Mukherjee, Minister of Health and Family Welfare of West Bengal
- Ram Baran Yadav, first President of Nepal
- Fazle Haque, former Cabinet Minister of West Bengal
- Narendra Nath Dutta, physician and industrialist
- Nilratan Sircar, physician, educationist, philanthropist and entrepreneur, Nil Ratan Sircar Medical College and Hospital named after him
- Radha Gobinda Kar, physician and philanthropist, R. G. Kar Medical College and Hospital named after him

== Gallery ==
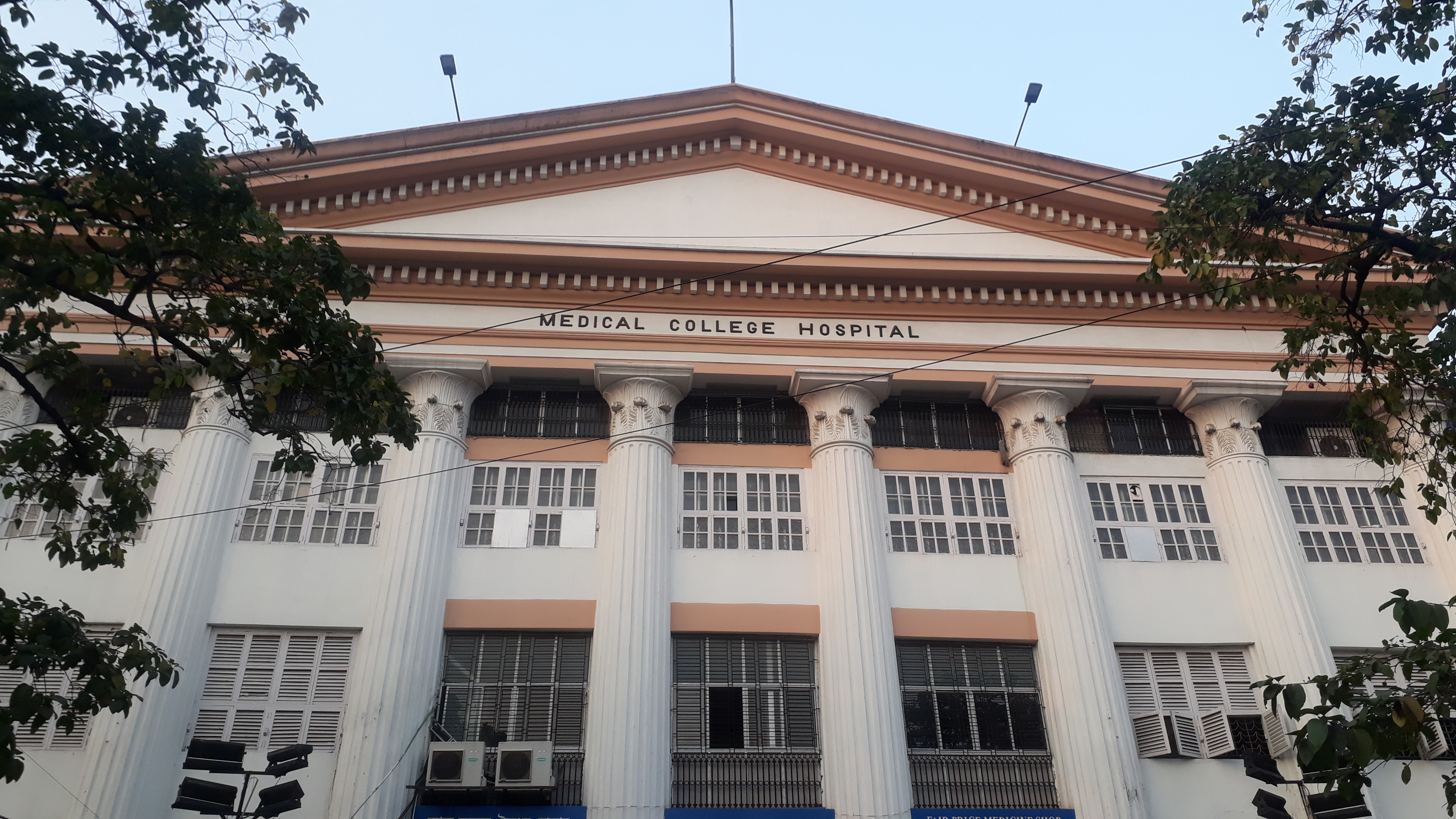
Main building of Medical College and Hospital, Kolkata

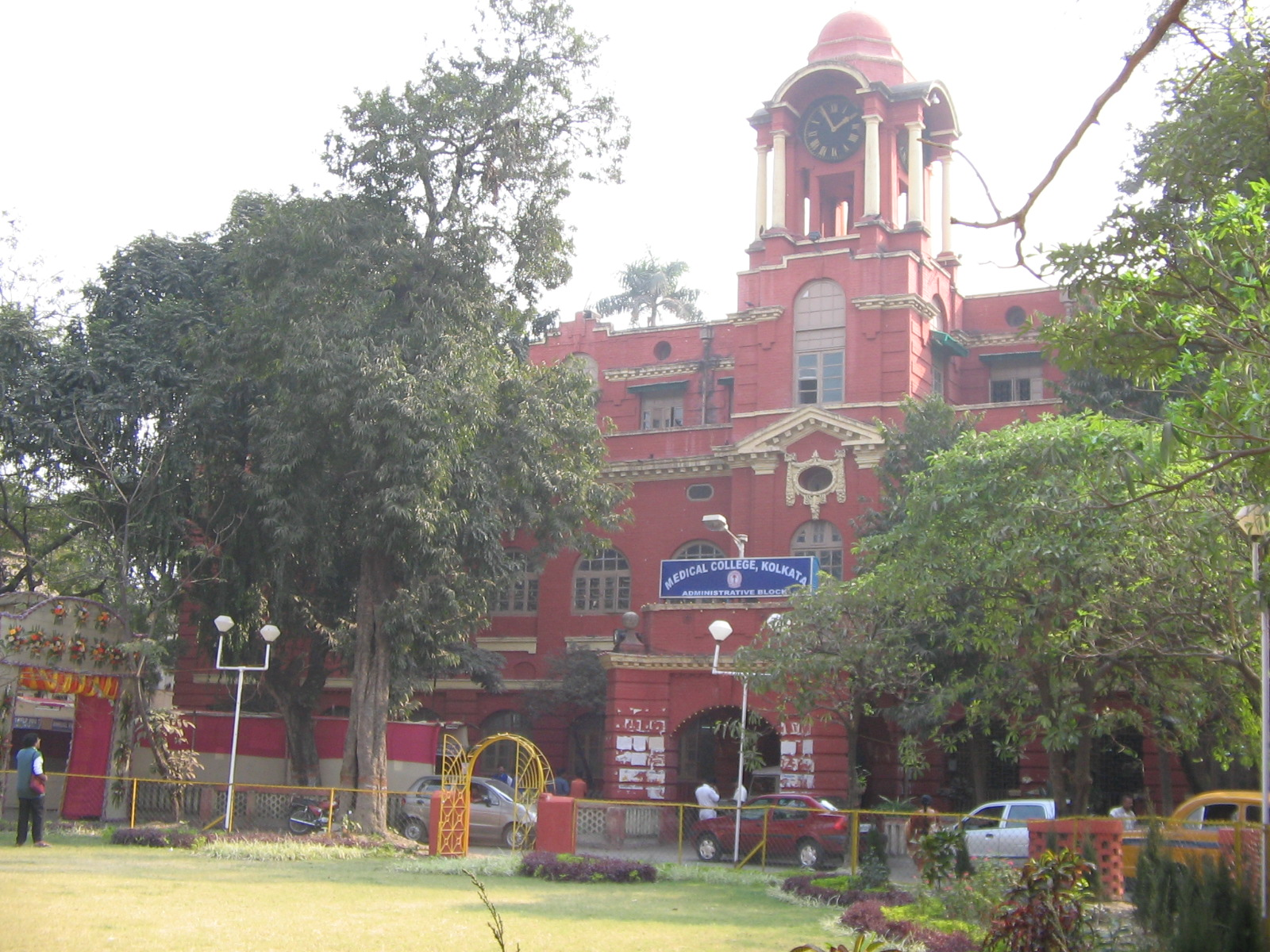
Front facade of the administrative block

Aerial view of the Eden Hospital of the MCK

Biochemistry Department of the MCK

== See also ==
- IPGMER and SSKM Hospital
- Nil Ratan Sircar Medical College and Hospital
- R. G. Kar Medical College and Hospital
- Ezra Hospital
- All India Institute of Medical Sciences, Kalyani
- College of Medicine & Sagore Dutta Hospital
- Calcutta National Medical College
- List of hospitals in India

== Bibliography ==
- David Arnold, Colonizing the Body: State Medicine and Epidemic Disease in Nineteenth Century India, Delhi, 1993
- Calcutta Medical College, The Centenary of the Medical College, Bengal, 1835–1934. Calcutta, 1935
- Das, Anirban; Sen, Samita (2011). "A history of the Calcutta Medical College and Hospital, 1835–1936". In Dasgupta, Uma (ed.). Science and Modern India: An Institutional History, C. 1784–1947. Pearson Education India. pp. 477–522. ISBN 978-81-317-2818-5.
- Poonam Bala, Imperialism and Medicine in Bengal: A Socio-Historical Perspective, New Delhi, 1991
- Sen, S.N., Scientific and Technical Education in India 1781–1900, Indian National Science Academy, 1991
