= Indian Medical Service =

Military medical service in British India

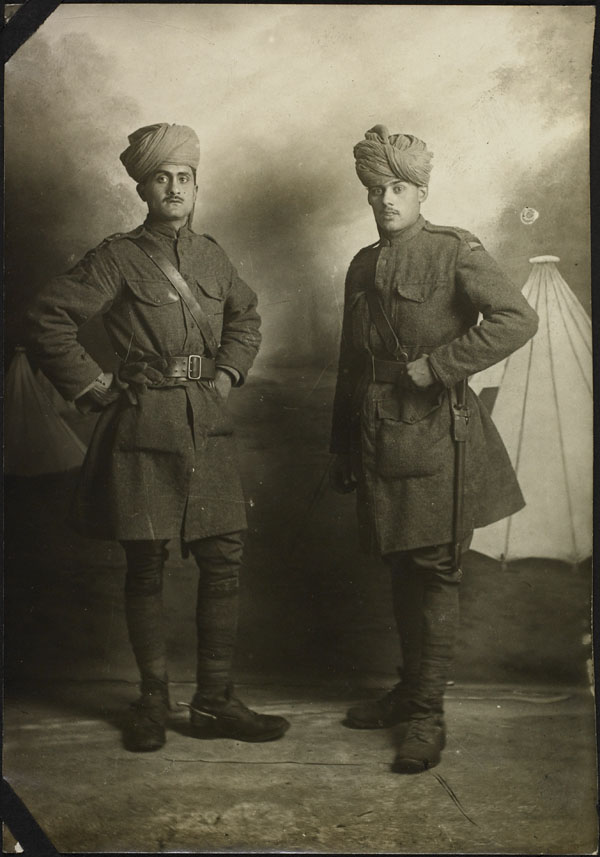
Unidentified members of the IMS in France, during World War I.

The Indian Medical Service (IMS) was a military medical service in British India, which also had some civilian functions. Originating during the East India Company's period of rule, it was organised into a single unified service in 1896, served during the two World Wars, and remained in existence until the independence of India in 1947.

Many of its officers, who were both British and Indian, served in civilian hospitals. Among its notable ranks, the IMS had Sir Ronald Ross, a Nobel Prize winner, Sir Benjamin Franklin, later honorary physician to three British monarchs and Henry Vandyke Carter, best known for his illustrations in the anatomy textbook Gray's Anatomy.

== History ==
=== Early history ===
The earliest positions for medical officers in the British East India Company (formed as the Association of Merchant Adventurers in 1599 and receiving the royal charter on the last day of 1600) were as ship surgeons. The first three surgeons to have served were John Banester on the Leicester, Lewis Attmer on the Edward and Rober on the Francis. The first Company fleet went out in 1600 with James Lancaster on the Red Dragon and three other ships, each with two surgeons and a barber. This was the voyage on which the serendipitous experiment on lemon juice as a cure for scurvy was carried out. The establishment of the East India Company in India was greatly aided by a doctor, although a lot of fiction may have been introduced into accounts relating to this. Gabriel Boughton is said to have saved Shah Jahan's daughter princess Jahanara from injuries due to burns. In reward he was given duty-free trading rights and this document was utilized by the East India Company to obtain a farman or rights for itself from the ruler in Surat.

As more factories of the East India Company were established in India at this time, new positions began to be created for the appointment of surgeons and physicians. These men of medicine included Nicholas Manucci, a Venetian born in 1639 who served Dara Shikoh before studying medicine in Lahore where he served Shah Alam from 1678 to 1682. Later, he then settled in Madras. An Armenian named Sikandar Beg served as surgeon to Suleiman Shikoh, son of Darah Shikoh, and there are records of several Dutch and French physicians in various courts across India. Samuel Browne served around 1694 at Fort St. George, Madras from where he also reported on his botanical and other natural history studies. Jean Martin served Haider Ali and Jean Castarede served under Tipoo Sultan. A hierarchy was introduced into the establishment of the East India Company in 1614 with the appointment of a surgeon general. The first to accept this position was John Woodall, who was however accused of embezzling pay from apprentices that he used to hire. With continuing complaints and financial crunch he was retrenched in 1642. Another Surgeon Walter Chesley was sent home from service in Sumatra for drunkenness, while a Dr. Coote was removed from Bencoolen for debauchery in 1697.

Surgeons were often assigned on diplomatic missions to various courts and they were found to be very influential. The first surgeon at Calcutta was a Dutchman who resigned in 1691. William Hamilton was particularly famous. John Zephaniah Holwell who came to Bengal as a Surgeon in 1732 was appointed as Zamindar of Calcutta. He was captured in 1756 by Siraj-ud-Daulah and survived the Black Hole. Holwell was noted as a careful student of native customs and it has been suggested that if he had been in charge of Fort William, the entire incident would not have happened. He returned to England and became as an advisor on various matters of government. Surgeons were often spared in wartime. William Fullerton was the sole survivor in 1763 at Patna when the English fought Nawab Mir Qasim. Later, around 1830, John Martin Honigberger from Transylvania served Ranjit Singh. He also worked at a hospital set up by Sir Henry Lawrence at Lahore. Benjamin Simpson is particularly well known for capturing numerous photographs during his service in the second half of the 19th century.

=== Later history ===
Later, in the nineteenth century, the IMS became one of the routes to becoming a Political officer in the Indian Political Department. The British Indian government set up the Calcutta School of Tropical Medicine between 1910 and its opening in 1921 as a postgraduate center for tropical medicine at the heart of the Indian Empire. Charles Stiebel served with the medical services during the First World War. In August 1915, he was transferred to the 5th Indian General Hospital at Alexandria in Egypt where he served for the 135th Indian Field Ambulance. Stiebel served as a lieutenant with the Indian Medical Service including with No. 1 Indian General Hospital.

On 3 April 1943, the Indian Medical Service, the Indian Medical Department, and the Indian Hospital & Nursing Corps were amalgamated into the Indian Army Medical Corps. It was formed as a wartime necessity for attracting suitably qualified men for service in a rapidly expanding army. The IAMC was re-designated the Army Medical Corps with effect from 26 January 1950.

== Structure ==
The first signs of organization began with the establishment of the Bengal Medical Service on 20 October 1763 with fixed grades, rules for promotion and service. Similar services were established by 1764 in both Madras and Bombay. In Bengal increasing military actions required the separation of Military Surgeons from Civil Surgeons. Each non-native regiment had a surgeon and over time the strength of the Medical Service grew. The Bengal service had 382 in 1854 while Madras had 217 and Bombay 181. For a while the military service also required combat service and upon promotion they could choose one branch either as Captain or Surgeon. The first Indian natives to join the service was Soorjo Coomar Goodeve Chuckerbutty who entered the service on 24 January 1855 followed by Rajendra Chandra Chandra on 27 January 1858. The Medical Services of the Madras, Bengal and Bombay Presidencies were united after 1857. Separate Medical Boards involved that recruited for the Presidencies were abolished on 12 November 1857. A single Indian Medical Service that separated from the civil medical service in 1858 was placed under a single Director General with effect from 1 April 1896, when the Bengal, Madras and Bombay medical services were formally amalgamated into a single organisation.

=== Ranks ===
Prior to the formation of the IMS in 1764, all medical officers in the employ of the East India Company were unranked. There were two grades of medical officer:

- Head Surgeon
- Surgeon

From 1764, there were four primary ranks of medical officer. The Surgeon-General (at other times designated Physician-General or Chief Surgeon) headed the service from around 1769, while Head Surgeons, who ranked immediately below, nominally oversaw the main military hospitals in the subcontinent, though the exact scope of their authority remained vague. Below the Head Surgeons were Surgeons, followed by Hospital Mates. Sometime prior to 1785, Head Surgeons were redesignated Surgeon-Majors, with Hospital Mates becoming Assistant Surgeons. Apart from the Surgeon-General or his equivalent, all medical officers ranked with warrant officers. The rank of Surgeon-Major was apparently discontinued around 1785 and replaced by the former rank of Head Surgeon. In 1786, formal three-member Medical Boards were established, with one Board for each Presidency.

On 24 October 1788, medical officers were reclassified as commissioned officers:

- Surgeon-General/Physician-General/Chief Surgeon
- Head Surgeons – ranking with Majors
- Surgeons – ranking with Captains
- Assistant Surgeons – ranking with Lieutenants

In 1807, the rank of Superintending Surgeon was officially introduced, having been informally used since around 1803. Ranking above Head Surgeons (redesignated Senior Surgeons around this time), they supplanted them as professional administrators of military hospitals. Each army division was allotted a Superintending Surgeon. In 1842, the three positions on each Medical Board were ranked in order of seniority as Physician-General, Surgeon-General and Inspector-General of Hospitals, respectively. In 1843, the East India Company formalized equivalent military ranks for medical officers, as follows:

- Physician-General/Surgeon-General/Inspector-General – ranking with Brigadier-Generals
- Superintending Surgeons – ranking with Lieutenant-Colonels
- Senior Surgeons – ranking with Majors
- Surgeons – ranking with Captains
- Assistant Surgeons – ranking with Lieutenants

When the British government dissolved the East India Company in 1858 and asserted its rule over India, it abolished the Medical Boards and replaced the appointments of Physician-General and Surgeon-General with a single Director-General. Superintending Surgeons were also redesignated Deputy Inspectors-General at the same time. The ranks of the medical service thus became:

- Director-General/Inspector-General – ranking with Brigadier-Generals
- Deputy Inspectors-General – ranking with Lieutenant-Colonels
- Senior Surgeons – ranking with Majors
- Surgeons – ranking with captains
- Assistant Surgeons – ranking with lieutenants

In 1862, the rank of director-general was briefly redesignated as principal inspector-general, but the former designation was restored in 1866, followed by the redesignation of director-general as inspector-general in 1869. A new ranking system was introduced in 1873:

- Surgeon-general – ranking with Brigadier-Generals
- Deputy surgeons-General – ranking with lieutenant-Colonels
- Surgeons-major – ranking with majors
- Surgeons (6+ years of service) – ranking with captains
- Surgeons (less than 6 years of service) – ranking with lieutenants

In 1880, the rank of brigade surgeon was introduced and all surgeons regardless of their date of joining were ranked as captains. The IMS ranks were then as follows:

- Surgeon-general – ranking with brigadier-generals
- Deputy surgeons-General – ranking with colonels
- Brigade surgeons – ranking with lieutenant-colonels
- Surgeons-major – ranking with majors
- Surgeons – ranking with captains

Excepting the surgeon-general, IMS officers were given formal military ranks for the first time in 1891, corresponding to those of their British Indian Army counterparts; simultaneously, the appointment of surgeon-general was upgraded to the equivalent of a major-general. The rank of surgeon-lieutenant was also introduced in 1891. In 1896, the head of the service was named its director-general, with the title of surgeon-general (major-general). The other IMS military ranks retained the prefix of "surgeon" until it was dropped in 1898. From 28 May 1913, the director-general, while holding the title of surgeon-general, was made eligible for promotion to the rank of lieutenant-general with the approval of the Secretary of State for India. From 5 June 1918, the title of surgeon-general was dropped, with the director-general to have the rank and title of either major-general or lieutenant-general.

== Directors-General Indian Medical Service ==
Key

- ^{†} Died in office

No.	Portrait	Name (born–died)	IMS batch	Term of office			Ref.
No.	Portrait	Name (born–died)	IMS batch	Took office	Left office	Time in office	Ref.
1		Surgeon-General (Note: With the rank of major general.) James Cleghorn; CSI QHS (19 May 1841-14 June 1920)	1865	1 April 1896	25 October 1898	3 years, 207 days	
2		Surgeon-General Robert Harvey; CB DSO FRCP (10 March 1842-1 December 1901)	1866	25 October 1898	1 December 1901 ^{†}	3 years, 37 days	
3		Surgeon-General Sir Benjamin Franklin; KCIE (30 April 1844-15 February 1917)	1869	2 December 1901	1 January 1905	3 years, 30 days	
4		Surgeon-General Sir Gerald Bomford; KCIE (19 July 1851-12 April 1915)	1874	1 January 1905	1 January 1910	5 years, 0 days	
5		Surgeon-General (Note: With the rank of major general until 22 September 1916, when promoted lieutenant-general.) Sir Charles Pardey Lukis; KCSI VD FRCS (9 September 1857-21 October 1917)	1880	1 January 1910	21 October 1917 ^{†}	7 years, 293 days	
6		Major-General (Note: With the rank and title of surgeon-general until 5 June 1918.) Sir William Rice Edwards; KCB KCIE CMG (17 May 1862-13 October 1923)	1886	8 January 1918	8 January 1923	5 years, 0 days	
7		Major-General Sir Robert Charles MacWatt; CIE FRCS (22 January 1865-14 April 1945)	1888	23 January 1923	1 April 1926	3 years, 68 days	
8		Major-General Sir (Thomas) Henry Symons; KBE CIE OBE (17 May 1872-3 July 1948)	1896	1 April 1926	1 April 1930	4 years, 0 days	
9		Major-General Sir John Wallace Dick Megaw; KCIE (8 February 1874-24 October 1958)	1900	1 April 1930	15 November 1933	3 years, 228 days	
10		Major-General Sir Cuthbert Allan Sprawson; CIE FRCP (1 March 1877-7 May 1956)	1900	15 November 1933	1 March 1937	3 years, 106 days	
11		Major-General Ernest Bradfield; CIE OBE FRCSE (28 May 1880-28 October 1963)	1903	1 March 1937	8 November 1939	2 years, 252 days	
12		Lieutenant-General Sir Gordon Gray Jolly; KCIE (6 April 1886-1 March 1962)	1908	8 November 1939	4 October 1943	3 years, 330 days	
13		Major-General Sir (James) Bennett Hance; KCIE OBE FRCSE (21 April 1887-5 September 1958)	1912	4 October 1943	12 March 1946	3 years, 39 days	
14		Lieutenant-General Robert Hay; CIE (8 March 1889-18 May 1980)	1914	12 March 1946	15 August 1947	1 year, 156 days	

== See also ==
- Royal Army Medical Corps
- Army Medical Corps (India)
- List of Indian Medical Service officers
- Central Health Service (CHS)
- Women’s Medical Service
