= Mowbray Thomson =

British Indian Army General (1832–1917)

General Sir Mowbray Thomson KCIE KH
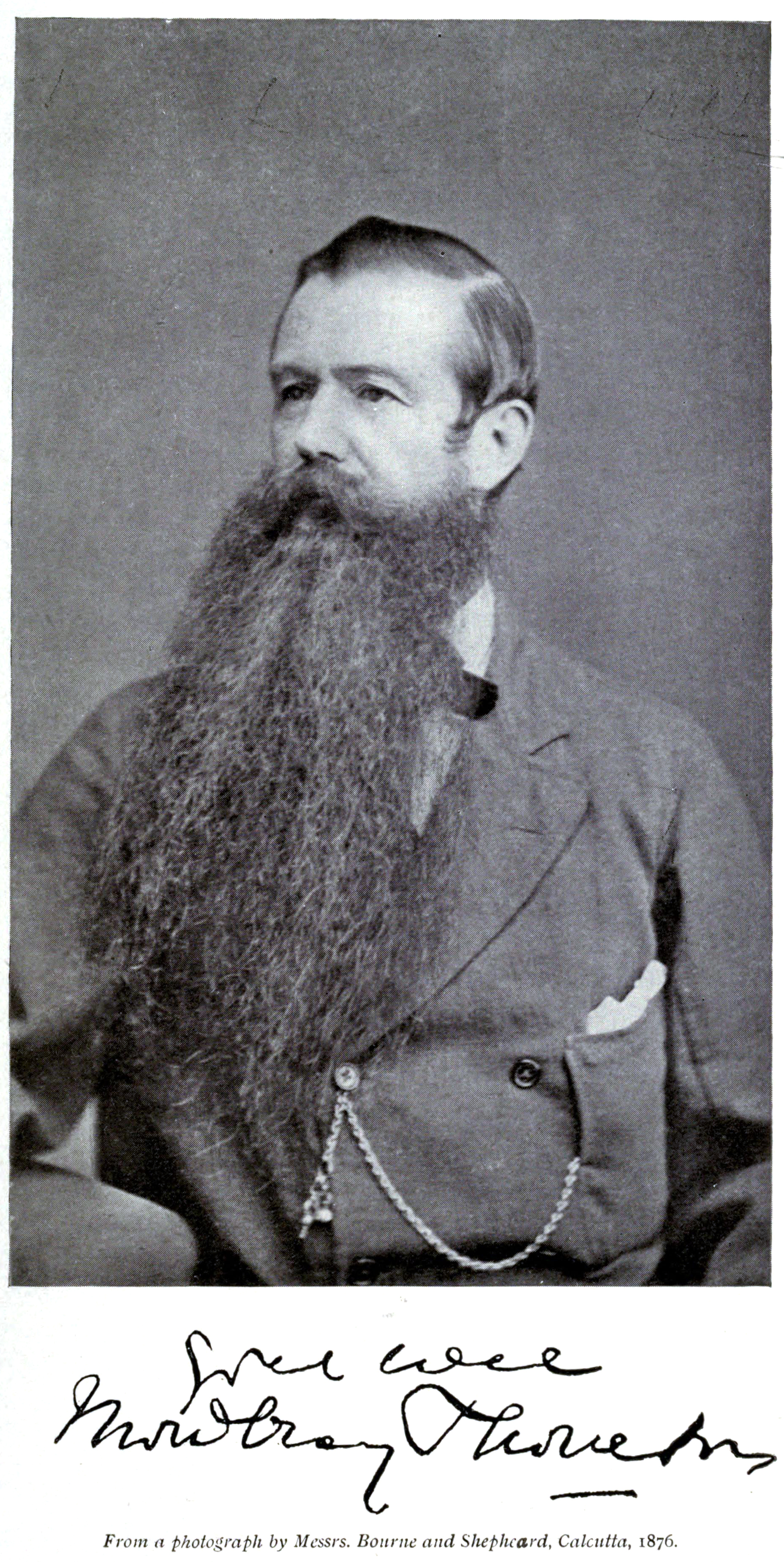
- Sir Mowbray Thomson
- Born: 1 April 1832; Bhurtpore, British India
- Died: 25 February 1917 (aged 84); Reading, Berkshire, England
- Burial place: Cremated at Golders Green Crematorium, London
- Alma mater: Addiscombe Military Seminary
- Relatives: Elizabeth (Eliza) Thomson (sister); James Sant, R.A. (brother-in-law)
- Military career
- Allegiance: East India Company (United Kingdom) British Empire
- Branch: Bengal Army; British Indian Army
- Rank: General
- Unit: Bengal Native Infantry
- Conflicts: Indian Mutiny of 1857; Second Anglo-Afghan War
- Awards: Knight Commander of the Order of the Indian Empire; Knight of the Royal Guelphic Order
- Other work: Political Agent; Governor-General's Agent

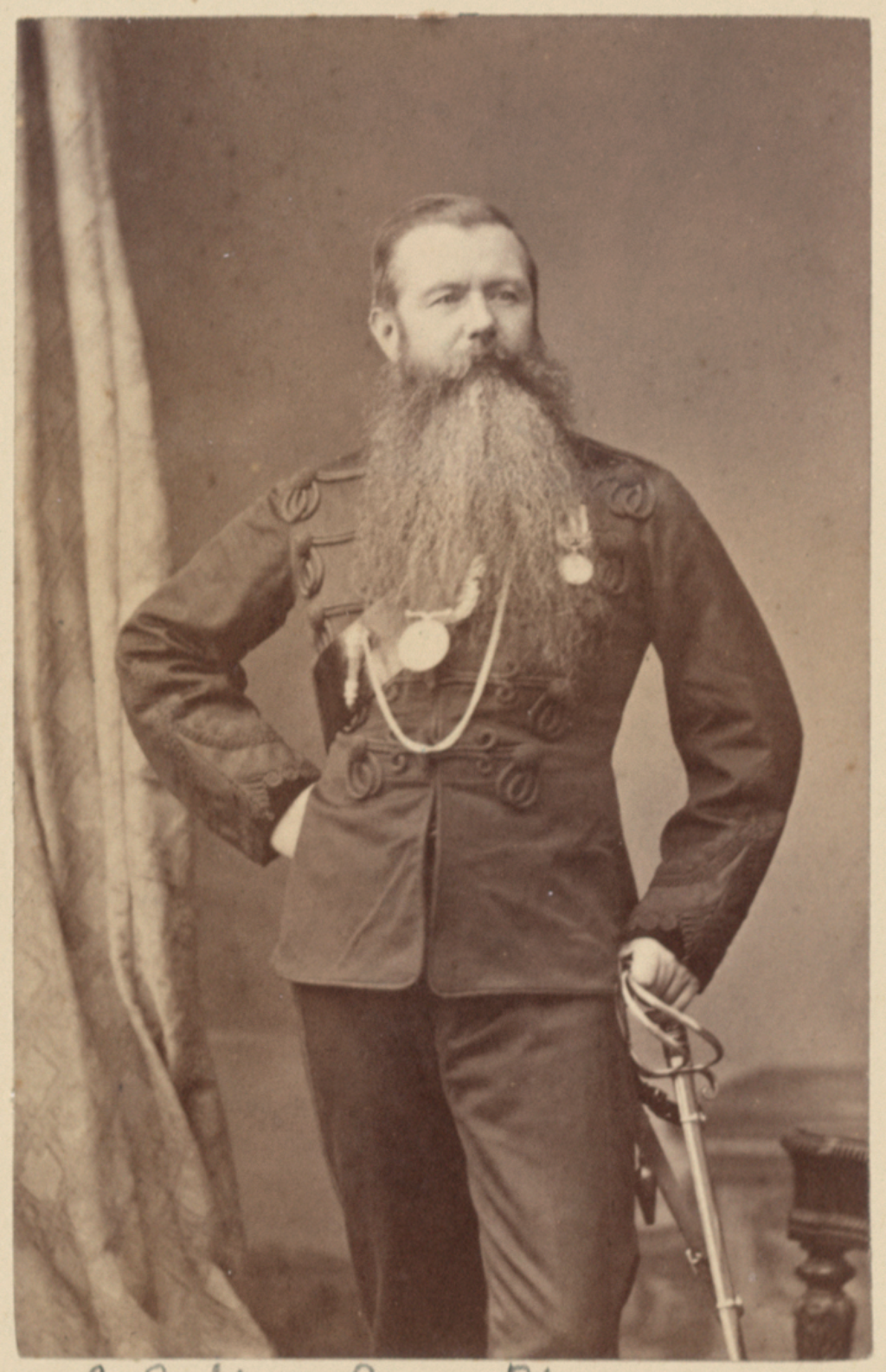
Military portrait of Colonel Mowbray Thomson from an Afghanistan Album (1879-80) of rare historical photographs by John Burke (photographer), Sir Benjamin Simpson KCIE, and others.

General Sir Mowbray Thomson KCIE KH (1 April 1832 – 25 February 1917) was an officer in the British East India Company and one of the only two survivors from the Cawnpore garrison.

== Early life and education ==
Mowbray Thomson was born in "Bhurtpore" (modern-day Bharatpur, Rajasthan), India, on 1 April 1832, the son of Dr Richard Mowbray Martin Thomson (1799–1848), a marine surgeon at Calcutta, and Mary, née Prendergast. He was educated in England and attended Addiscombe Military Seminary as a cadet.

== Military career ==
In 1853 he received a commission in the 53rd Bengal Native Infantry, a regiment in the British East India Company. During the Indian Mutiny of 1857, Thomson played a key role in the defence of Wheeler's Entrenchment during the Siege of Cawnpore. He was one of the few survivors of the siege and subsequent massacre at Sati Chaura Ghat.

Thomson was invalided to England, heavily wounded, and promoted to brevet-major. While convalescing in England, he wrote The Story of Cawnpore, a first-hand account of the siege, which was published in 1859.

After returning to India, he was given a civilian post as Political Agent at Manipur and later appointed Agent to the Governor-General for Wajid Ali Shah, the former King of Oudh. He retired in 1885 with the army rank of major-general and was promoted to full general in 1894.

Thomson died in Reading, Berkshire, England, on 25 February 1917. The funeral service was held on 28 February in Saint Bartholomew's Church, Reading, Berkshire, and his body was cremated at Golders Green Crematorium in London.

== Family ==
Thomson married Mary Ironside Money (1835-1903) on 26 November 1859 in Calcutta, and the couple had five children. Mowbray Townshend Thomson, the eldest and only son, rose to the rank of Lieutenant-Colonel in the 4th Goorkha Rifles.

Mowbray Thomson's younger sister, Elizabeth (Eliza) Thomson (1833–1907), married James Sant R.A., Queen Victoria's portrait painter.

== Memorial ==
A brass plaque commemorating Gen. Sir Mowbray Thomson KCIE is located in the All Souls' Memorial Church in Kanpur, India (Protestant).
