= Albert James Leppoc Cappel =

Sir Albert James Leppoc Cappel KCIE MICE (1836–1924) was a senior administrator in India who oversaw the installation and running of the Indian telegraph system.

== Life ==
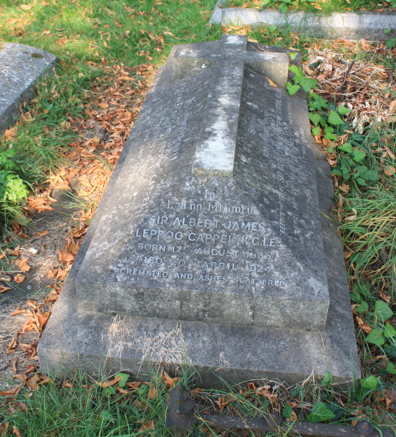
The Leppoc Cappel stone, Brompton Cemetery

He was born on 17 August 1836 in India the son of James Leppoc Cappel.

He served in the Crimean War 1855/6 attached to the Turkish contingent. After this he returned to India and joined the newly formed Indian Telegraph Service in 1857. In 1866 he was involved in the first permanent TransAtlantic telegraph cable. Rising rapidly in this field he became Director of Telegraph Traffic in 1869 and Deputy Director General of the whole telegraph service in 1879. In 1883 he was appointed Director of Telegraphs for all India. During his period there was a huge increase in service across the continent.

On 15 February 1887 he was knighted as a Knight Commander of the Order of the Indian Empire by Queen Victoria.

He retired from the Indian Telegraph Service in 1888/9 but retained an active involvement (and shares) in various telegraph companies in particular the Eastern Telegraph Company and was also a director of the Globe Telegraph and Trust Company and trustee of the Submarine Cable Trust.

He lived his final years at 27 Kensington Court Gardens in London. He was a member of the St Stephen's Club.

He served on the council of the Institute of Civil Engineers 1900 to 1902.

He died on 20 April 1924. He was cremated and his ashes were scattered but is memorialised on a tomb at Brompton Cemetery.

== Family ==
He was married to Fanny Gibbon (1849-1907).

They were parents to Stephen Filgate Leppoc Cappel of the Indian Forest Service.
