= Benjamin Simpson =

British Surgeon-General and photographer

Sir Benjamin Simpson KCIE (31 March 1831 – 27 June 1923) was a British Surgeon-General and photographer who served in the Indian Medical Service Bengal from 1853 until 1890 His late 19th century photos of Kandahar, Quetta, Bombay, Tomb of Amhed Shah, Baba Wali Kotal, Idgah Gate, Durani, Chilzina, Tukatoo, and Kirka Sharif have been collected in albums. Because the photos were grouped with those of John Burke (photographer) and those of others, many cannot be attributed.

Simpson was a member of the Bengal Photographic Society and produced 80 photographs grouped as Racial Types of Northern India he exhibited at the London International Exhibition in 1862, earning a gold medal. He also visited Assam in 1867 and 1868 producing illustrations for Descriptive ethnology of Bengal published in 1872. His photographs were also used in the eight volume series The People of India published 1868–1875. Simpson also photographed scenes during the Second Afghan War of 1879–1880 in Kandahar, Afghanistan. They were published by Bourne & Shepherd.

On 15 February 1887 he was in the first group of people appointed Knights Commander of the Order of the Indian Empire (KCIE).

== Gallery ==
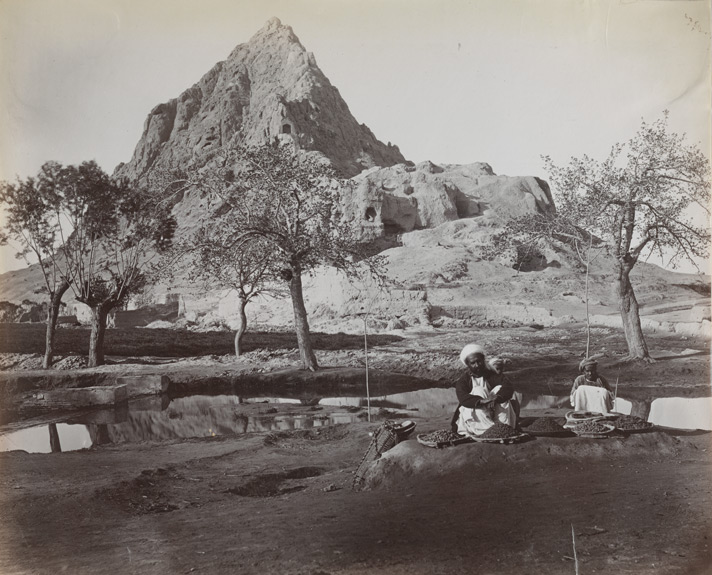
Chilzina in Kandahar circa 1881

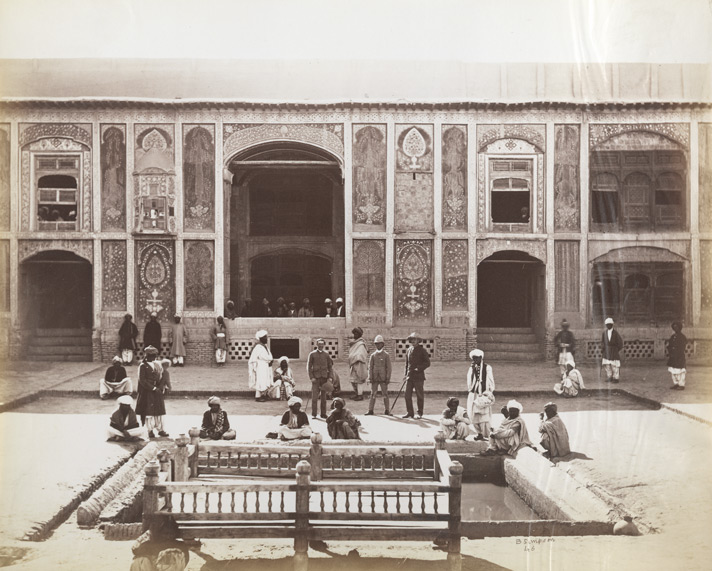
Courtyard of Wali Sher Ali in 1881

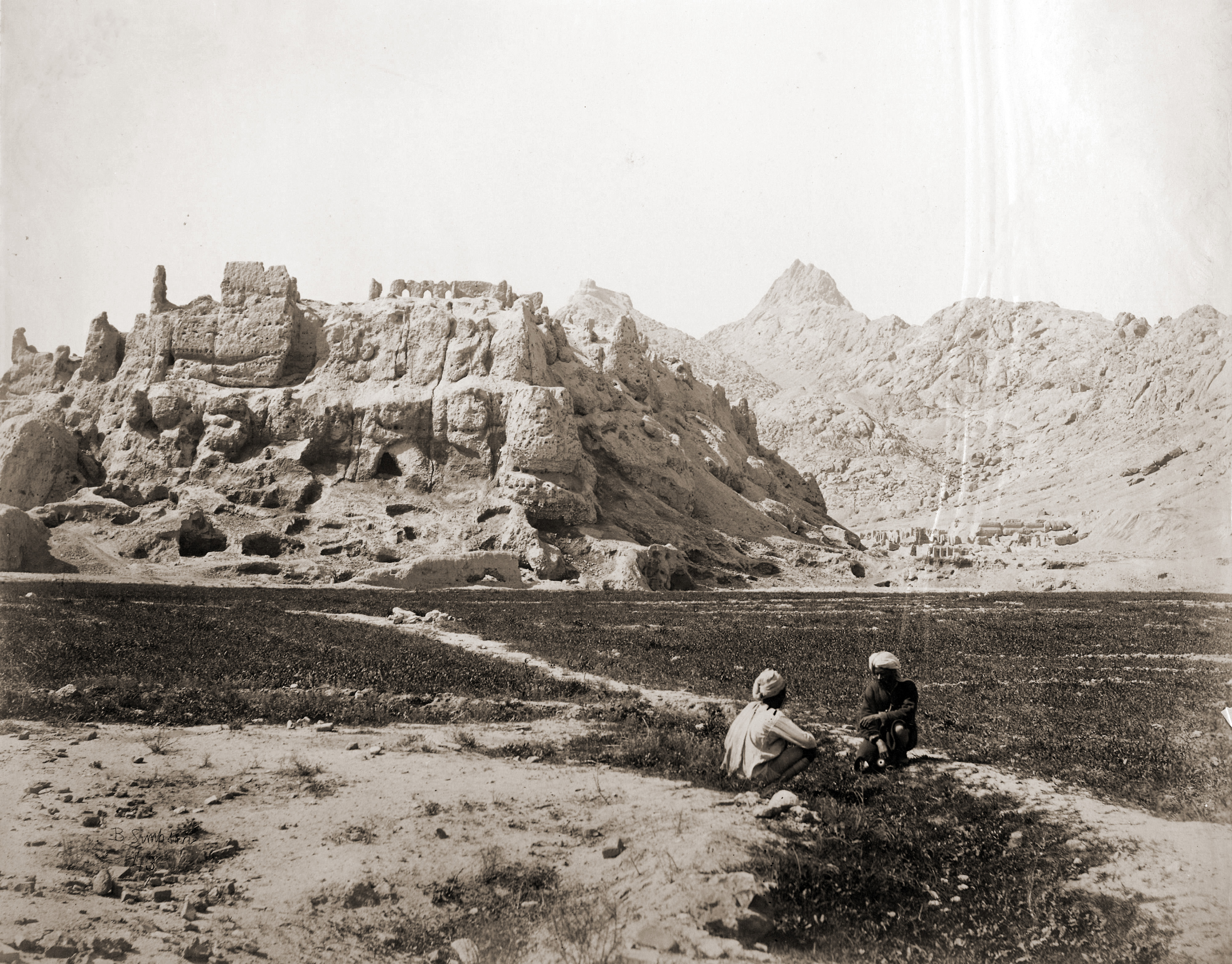
Ruins of the old Kandahar Citadel, 1881

Afghanistan Album with photographs from Simpson, John Burke and others

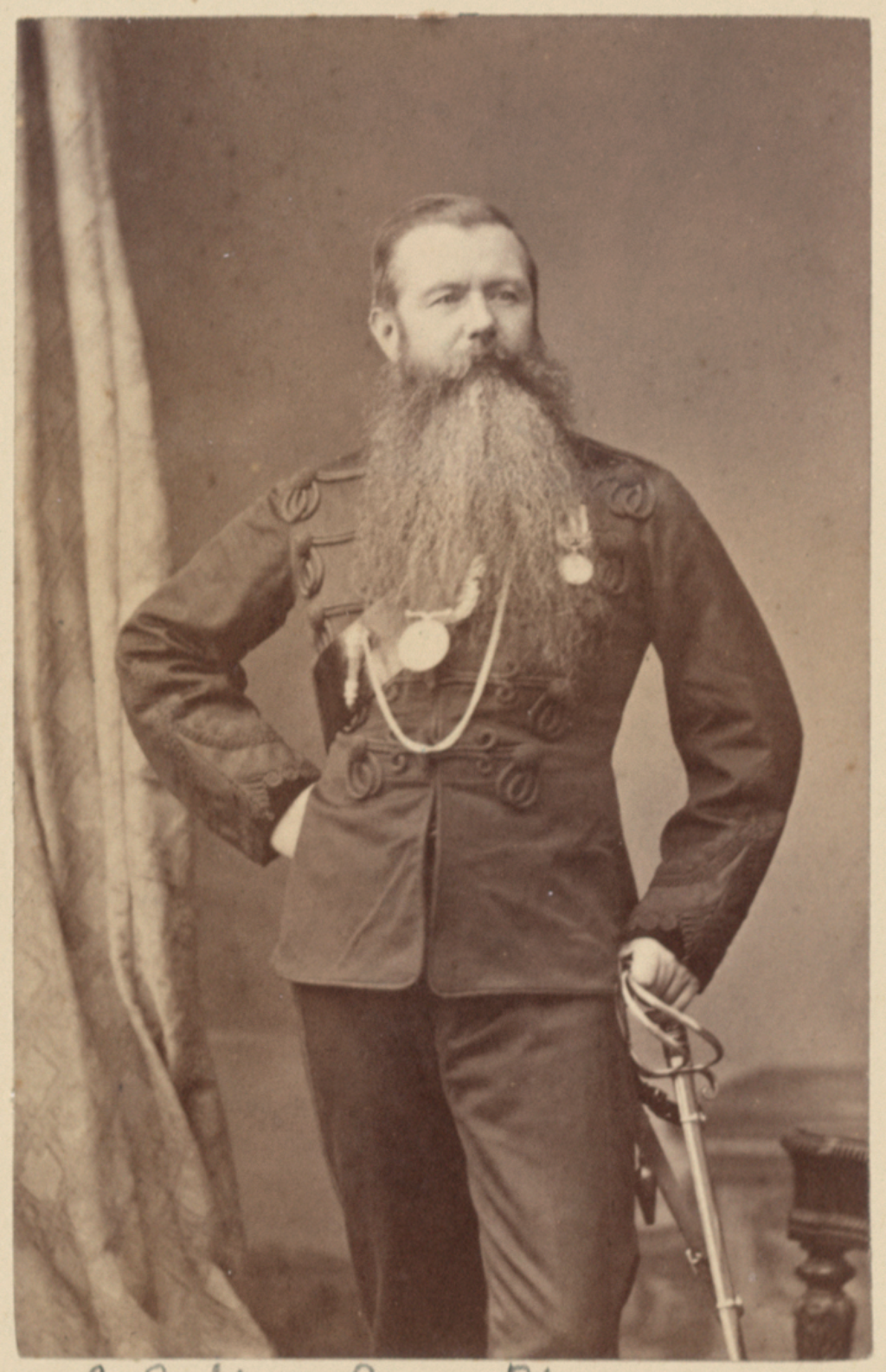
Photograph of Col. Mowbray Thomson from Afghanistan Album
