= Benjamin Franklin (surgeon) =

British surgeon (1844–1917)

Sir Benjamin Franklin KCIE
- Born: 1844
- Died: 17 February 1917 (aged 72–73)
- Education: University College London
- Military career
- Rank: Surgeon general

Sir Benjamin Franklin KCIE (1844 – 17 February 1917) was a British army surgeon.

== Early life ==
Franklin was born in 1844. He was educated at University College London and in Paris.

== Career ==
He entered the Indian Medical Service in April 1869, and worked at Lucknow and Simla. In 1894 he was appointed personal physician to Lord Elgin, the Viceroy, and held this position until 1899.

He was appointed Director General of the Indian Medical Service on 2 December 1901, and was thus the highest ranked officer in the military medical service in British India. The position was combined with that of Sanitary Commissioner with the Government of India, and ranked as a major general, though he also received the personal promotion to the rank of surgeon-general on the day of appointment.

He was honorary physician to Queen Victoria, King Edward VII and King George V, and served as the British delegate to the International Sanitary Conferences at Rome in 1907 and Paris in 1911–12. He was appointed a Companion of the Order of the Indian Empire (CIE), then promoted to a Knight Commander of the order (KCIE) in the 1903 Durbar Honours.

== Death ==
He died on 17 February 1917.
