= John Burke (photographer) =

19th-century British photographer in India and Afghanistan

- Died: 1900
- Occupation: Photographer

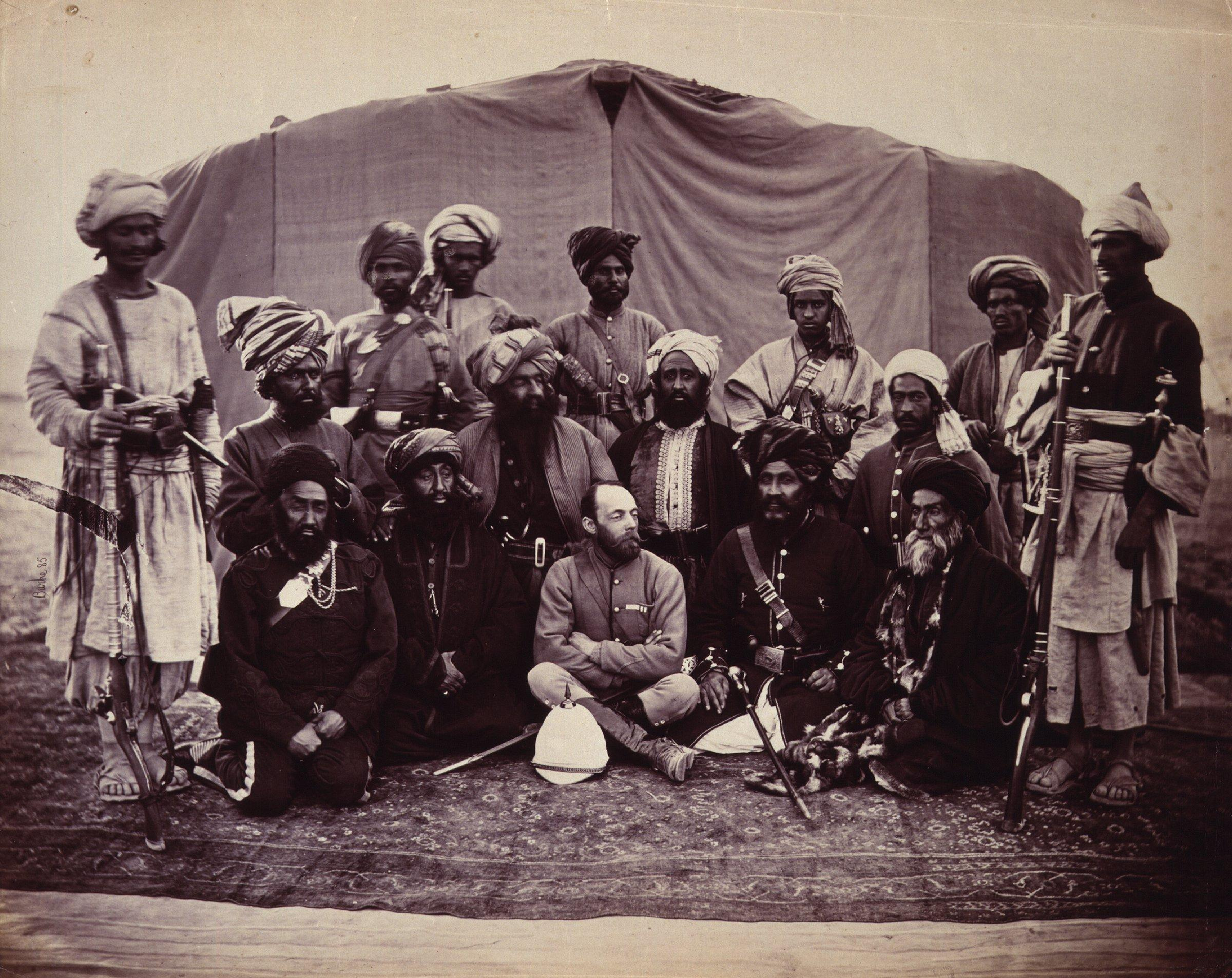
Pierre Louis Napoleon Cavagnari with the Sirdars by John Burke, late 1870s

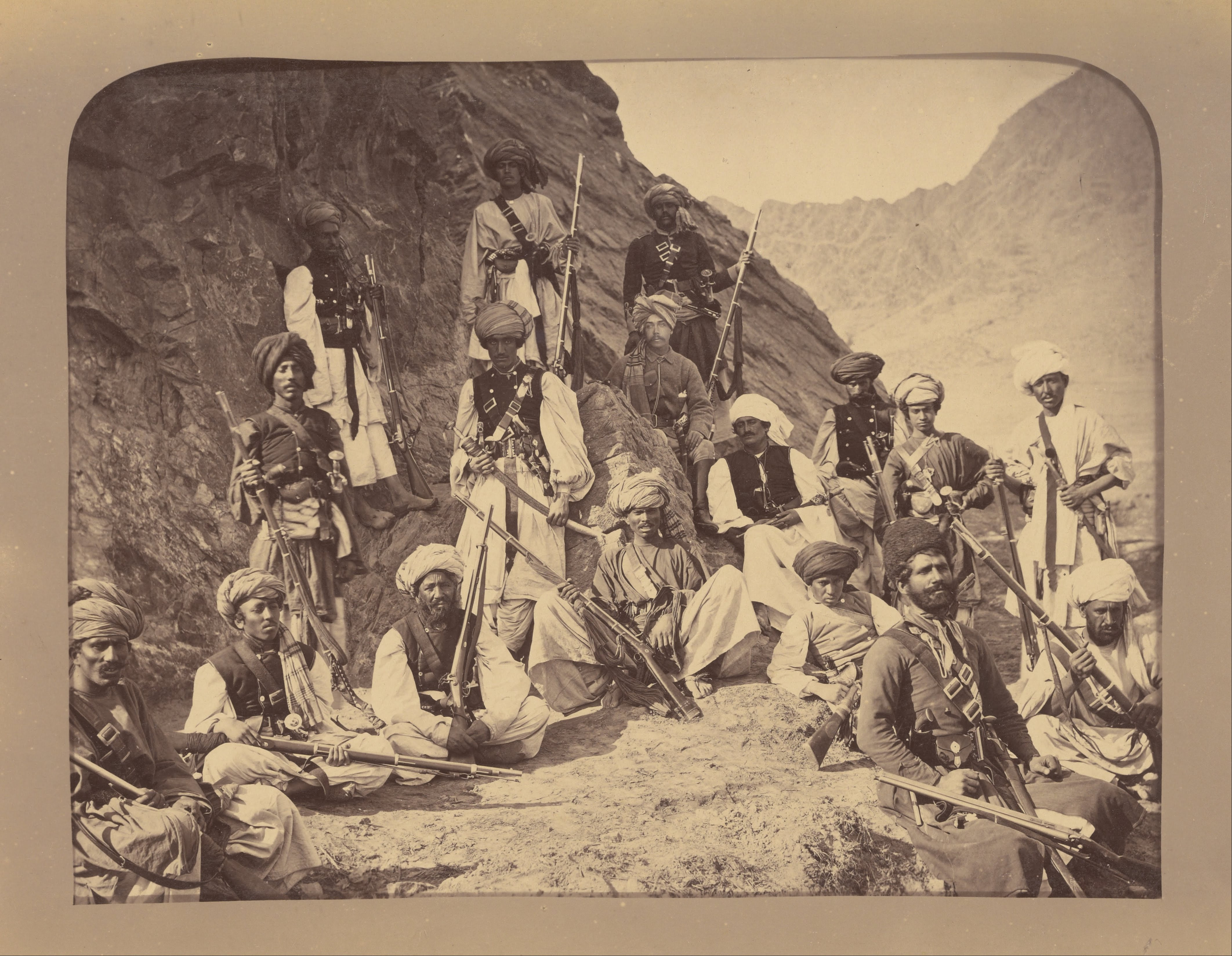
Warburton with Nauroz Khan of Lalpura Mohmands

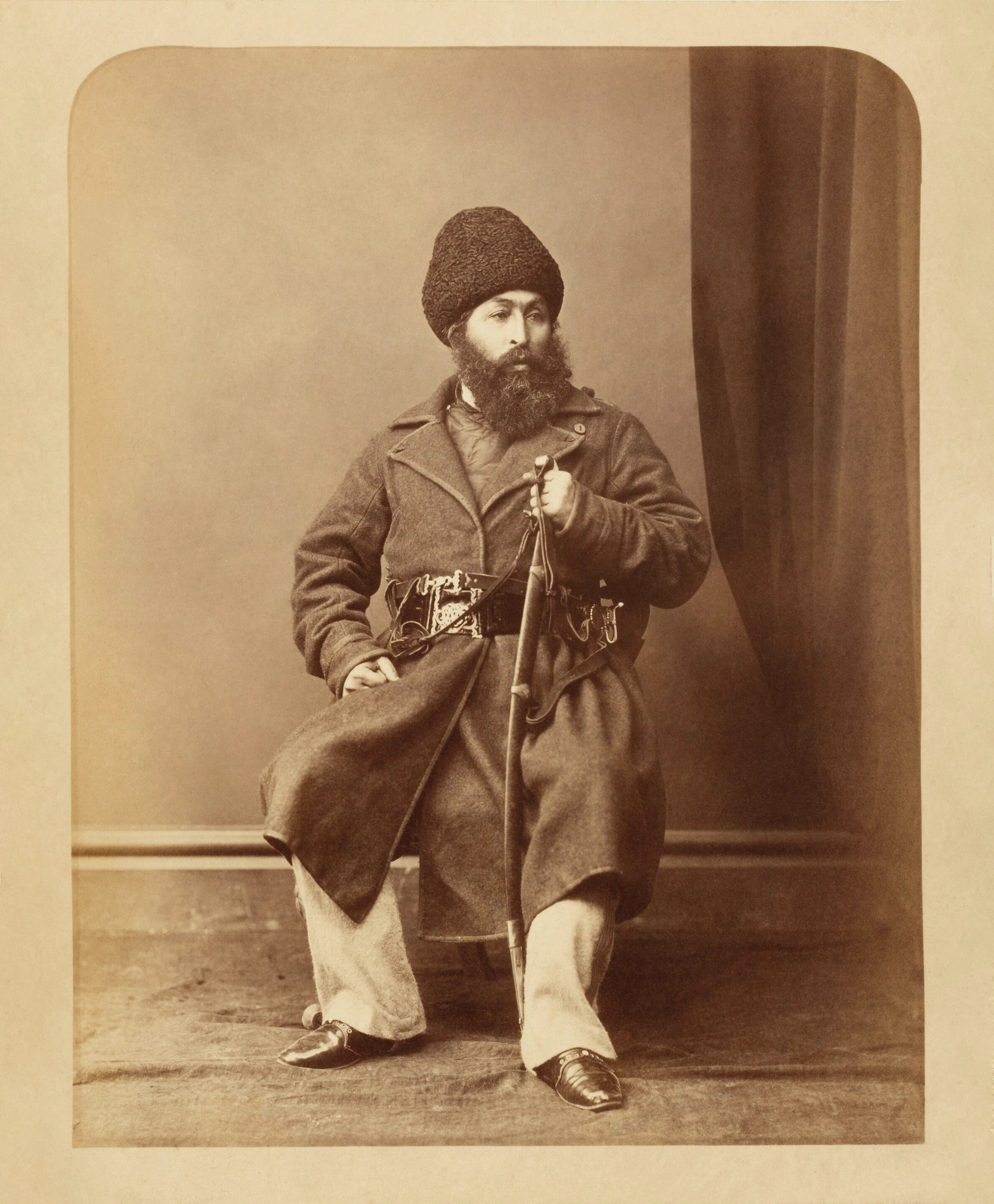
Shir Ali Khan in 1869

John Burke (c. 1843 – 1900) was an Irish photographer, best known for his photographs of the Second Anglo-Afghan War between 1878 and 1880. He was born in Ireland, around 1843, where he was a tradesman. He applied for a job in the British Army as an official photographer but travelled to Afghanistan at his own expense using heavy cameras that would have needed transporting on pack animals through mountainous regions. Burke was the first significant photographer of Afghanistan. He died in 1900. Burke's photographs have been grouped in albums with those of Benjamin Simpson and other photographers, so definitive attribution is not possible for some of his works.

== Gallery ==
Photographs by John Burke
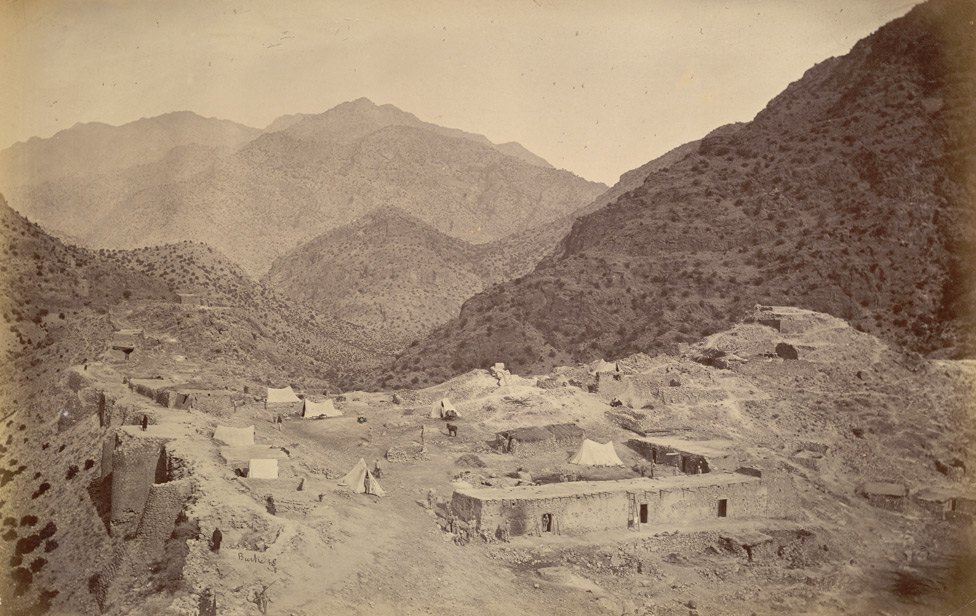
The aftermath of the Battle of Ali Masjid, 1878

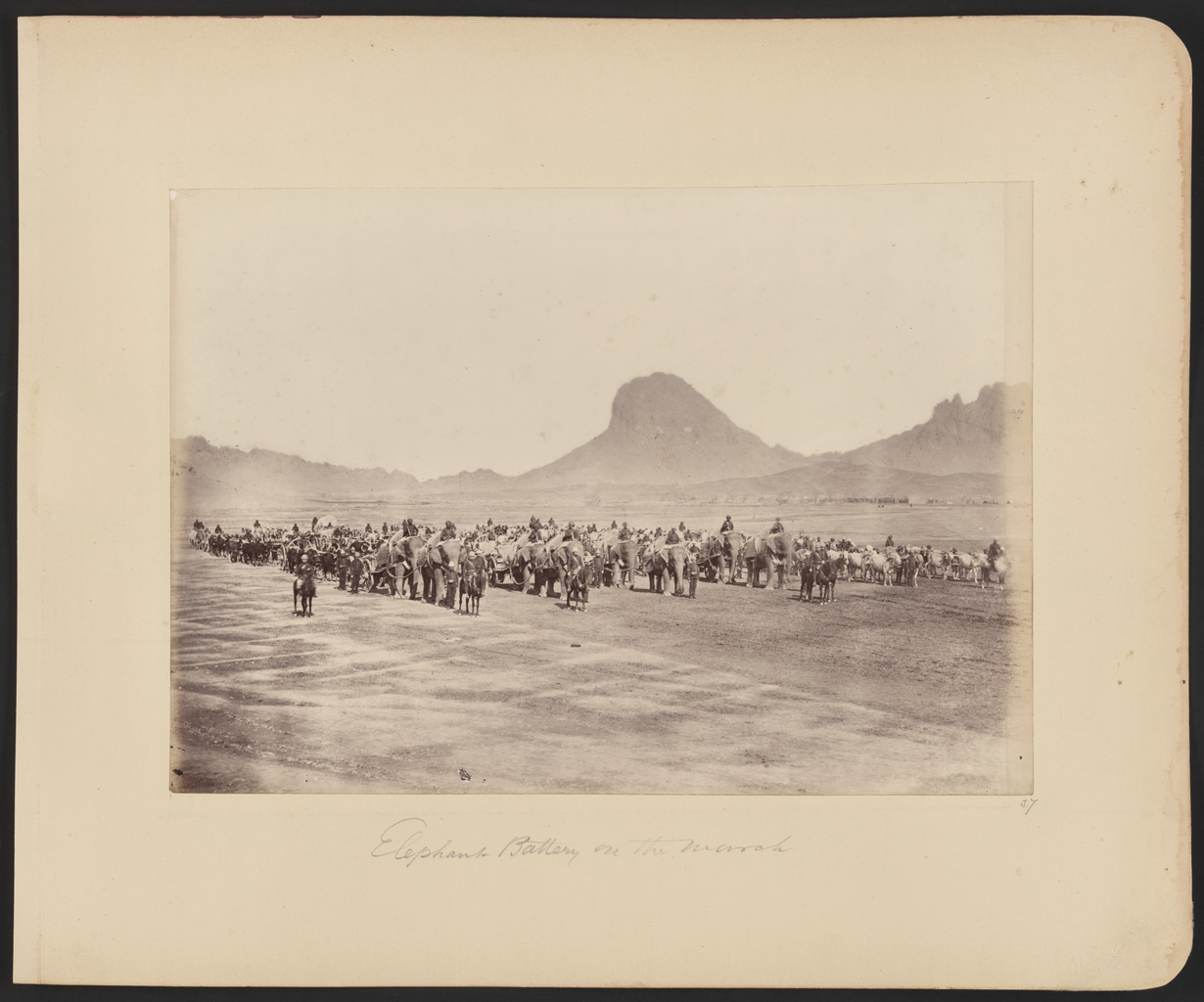
Elephant Battery during the Second Anglo-Afghan War

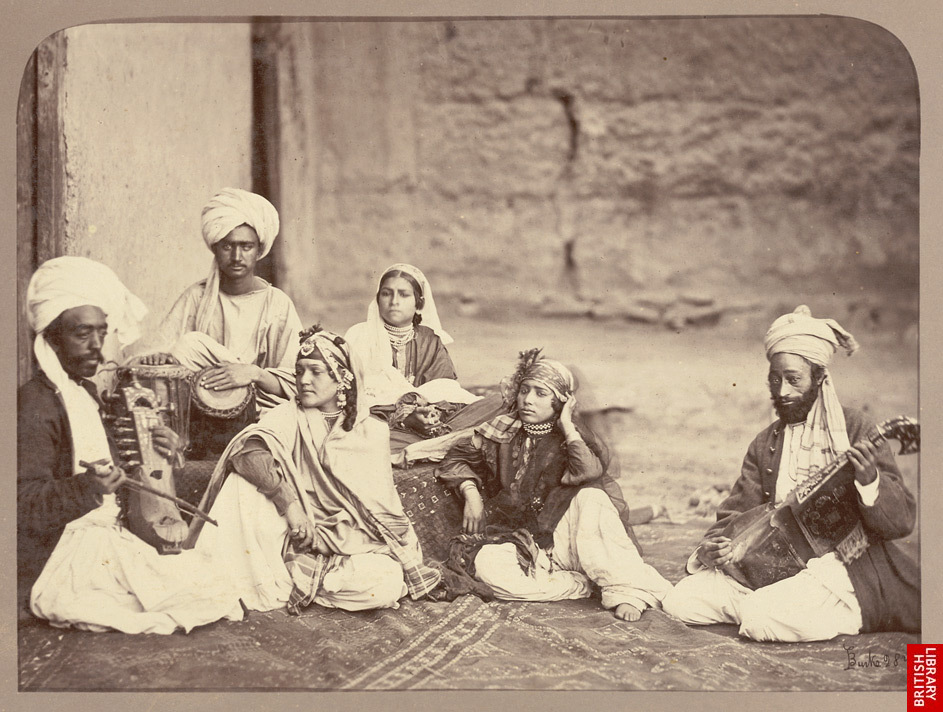
"Nautch girls, [Kabul]", c.1879-80

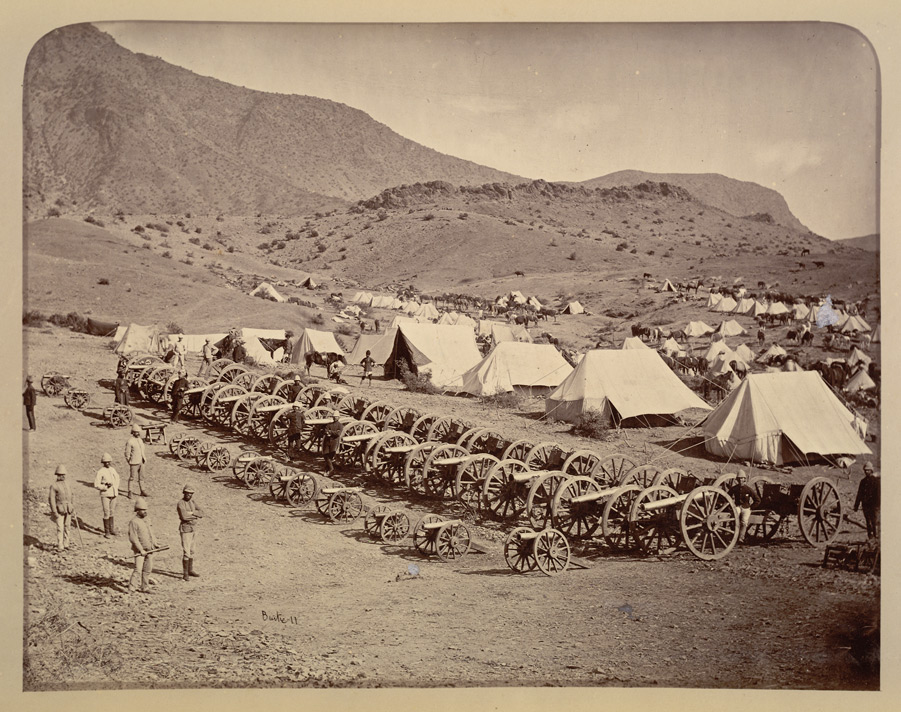
Battle of Ali Masjid: 24 captured large Afghan guns

== See also ==
- Samuel Bourne
- Frederick Fiebig
- Linnaeus Tripe
