= Order of the Indian Empire =

Dormant British order of chivalry established 1878

Most Eminent Order of the Indian Empire
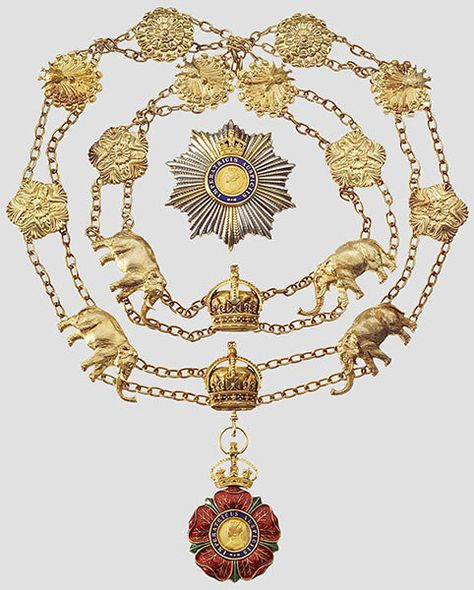
- The insignia of a Knight Grand Commander of the Most Eminent Order of the Indian Empire (GCIE)

Awarded by the British monarch
- Type: Order of chivalry
- Established: 1878
- Motto: Imperatricis auspiciis
- Awarded for: At the monarch's pleasure
- Status: Not awarded since 1947; Dormant since 2010
- Founder: Victoria
- Grades: Knight Grand Commander (GCIE); Knight Commander (KCIE); Companion (CIE)

Precedence
- Next (higher): Order of St Michael and St George
- Next (lower): Royal Victorian Order
- Ribbon bar of the Order of the Indian Empire

The Most Eminent Order of the Indian Empire is an order of chivalry founded by Queen Victoria on 1 January 1878. The Order includes members in three classes or ranks:

1. Knight Grand Commander (GCIE)
2. Knight Commander (KCIE)
3. Companion (CIE)

New appointments to the order ceased after 1947, the year that British India became the independent Union of India and Dominion of Pakistan. With the death of the last surviving knight, the Maharaja Meghrajji III of Dhrangadhra, the order became dormant in 2010.

The motto of the Order is Imperatricis auspiciis, (Latin for "Under the auspices of the Empress"), a reference to Queen Victoria, the first Empress of India. The Order is the junior British order of chivalry associated with the British Indian Empire; the senior one is The Most Exalted Order of the Star of India.

== History and Senior Recipients ==
Queen Victoria founded the Order in 1878 to reward British and native officials who served in British India. The Order originally had only one class (Companion), but expanded to comprise two classes in 1887. The Order was open only to men, and at the same time Victoria founded the Imperial Order of the Crown of India, which was to be awarded to women of a clearly defined status.

The British authorities intended the Order of the Indian Empire as a less exclusive version of the Order of the Star of India (founded in 1861); consequently, many more appointments were made to the former than to the latter.

On 15 February 1887, the Order of the Indian Empire formally became "The Most Eminent Order of the Indian Empire" and was divided into two classes: knights commander and companions. The following are those made knight commander, listed up to 1906:

- Maharaja Harendra Kishore Singh Bahadur (1884)
- Dietrich Brandis (1887)
- Alexander Meadows Rendel
- Donald Campbell Macnabb
- George Birdwood
- Surgeon-General Benjamin Simpson
- Albert James Leppoc Cappel
- Donald Mackenzie Wallace
- Alfred Woodley Croft
- Bradford Leslie
- Jaswantsinghji Fatehsinghji, Thakur Sahib of Limri
- William Gerald Seymour Vesey-Fitzgerald
- Charles Arthur Turner (1888)
- Edwin Arnold
- Arthur Nicolson, 1st Baron Carnock
- Raymond West
- Guilford Lindsey Molesworth
- Frederick Russell Hogg
- Sirdar Nauroz Khan, of Kharan
- Rajagopala Krishna Yachendra of Venkatagiri
- Henry Mortimer Durand (1889)
- Arthur George Macpherson
- William Markby
- H. S. Cunningham
- Maharana Shri Wakhat Singh Dalil Singh, Raja of Lunavada.
- Roper Lethbridge (1890)
- Charles Canning, 1st Earl Canning
- Edward Charles Kayll Ollivant (1892)
- Charles Pontifex
- Henry Hoyle Howorth MP
- Henry Seymour King
- Lieutenant-Colonel William Brereton Hudson (1893)
- Lieutenant-General Thomas Edward Gordon
- Lieutenant-General Edward Charles Sparshott Williams
- Field Marshall George White VC
- John Lambert
- Colonel John Charles Ardagh (1894)
- James Lyle Mackay
- Henry Ravenshaw Thuillier (1895)
- Nawab Sidi Ahmad Khan Sidi Ibrahim Khan of Janjira
- Sirdar Krishna Rao Bapu Saheb Jadu
- Raja Sri Rao Vencatesveta Chalapati Ranga Rao Bahadur of Bobbili
- Sir William Robert Brooke (Director General of Telegraphs, India)
- Maharaja Pratap Narayan Singh of Ayudhya
- Maharaja Ravaneshwar Prasad Singh, Bahadur of Gidhaur
- Lt.Col. Adalbert Cecil Talbot
- Maj.-Gen. Thomas Dennehy (1896)
- His Highness Maharaja Sawai Ranjor Singh Bahadur, of Ajaigarh (1897)
- Henry William Bliss
- Shri Shaurya Prakash, K.C.I.E.
- Nawab Amir-ud-din Ahmad Khan Bahadur, Chief of Loharu.
- Nawab Sir Khwaja Salimullah Bahadur, Nawab of Dhaka
- Colonel William Sinclair Smith Bisset
- General Edward Stedman
- John Jardine
- Rear-Admiral John Hext
- Mancherjee Merwanjee Bhownaggree
- Colonel Thomas Hungerford Holdich
- Baba Khem Singh Bedi, of Kallar (1898)
- Victor Bruce, 9th Earl of Elgin
- George King, KCIE
- Sir Arthur Wilson,
- Francis William Maclean
- Sir Andrew Wingate W.C.
- Kunwar Harnam Singh, Ahluwalia
- Maj.-Gen. Sir Gerald De Courcy Morton
- Gen. Sir George Corrie Bird
- S. Subramaniya Aiyar, CIE, Dewan Bahadur (1900)
- Oliver Russell, 2nd Baron Ampthill
- Alexander Frederick Douglas Cunningham (1901)
- Henry Evan Murchison James
- Maharaj Ganga Singh of Bikaner
- Shahbaz Khan Bugti
- James George Scott
- Maharaja Dhiraj Milkman Sign Eahadur (1902)
- Maharaja Rameshwara Singh Bahadur
- Sir Thomas Higham
- Col. Sir Samuel Swinton Jacob
- Lt.Col. Sir William Hutt Curzon Wyllie
- Sir Lawrence Hugh Jenkins (1903)
- Khan Bahadur Khuda Bakhsh, CIE (1903)
- Sir Herbert Thirkell White
- Sir Charles Lewis Tupper, CSI
- Surgeon-General Benjamin Franklin, CIE,
- Sir Frederick Augustus Nicholson, CSI
- Sir Arthur Upton Fanshawe, Esq, CSI,
- Sir Walter Roper Lawrence, Esq, CIE,
- Sir John Eliot, Esq, CIE,
- Raja Dhiraj Nahar Singh, of Shahpura,
- Gangadhar Rao Ganesh, alias Bala Sahib Patwar-Dhan, Chief of Miraj
- Sardar Ghaus Bakhsh, Raisani,
- Maharaja Harballabh Narayan Singh Bahadur, of Sonbursa,
- Maharaja Peshkar Kishn Parshad
- Puma Narasingharao Krishna Murti, CIE,
- Maj.-Gen. Sir Edmond Roche Elles (1904)
- Sir Henry Thoby Prinsep
- Pherozeshah Merwanji Mehta
- Col. Sir Buchanan ScottJashwant_Singh_II
- Col. Sir John Walter Ottley
- Raja Jaswant Singh, of Sailana
- Major Sir Francis Edward Younghusband
- Bt.-Col. Sir James R. L. Macdonald
- Sri Ugyen Wangchuk, Tongsa Penlop of Bhutan
- Sir Frederic Styles Philpin Lely (1905)
- General Sir Mowbray Thomson (1911)

Only a few months later, on 21 June 1887, a further proclamation regarding the Order was made. The Order was thence expanded from two classes to three – adding a rank of Knight Grand Commander to the extant Knight Commander and Companion classes. Seven knights grand commander were created, mostly members of the Royal Family, namely:

- The Prince of Wales
- The Duke of Edinburgh
- The Duke of Connaught and Strathearn
- The Duke of Cambridge
- Lord Reay, Governor of Bombay
- Lord Connemara, Governor of Madras
- General Sir Frederick Sleigh Roberts (promoted from a Knight Commander)

=== Honorary awards ===
Also from 1897, 3 honorary knights commander were made: Léon Émile Clément-Thomas (1897); Col. Sir Eduardo Augusto Rodriques Galhardo (Jan 1901); and Sir Hussien Kuli Khan, Mokhber-ed-Dowlet (June 1902).

- Emperor Gojong of Korea was made an honorary Knight Grand Commander on 17 December 1900.

== Ceasement ==
Appointments to both the Order of the Star of India and the Order of the Indian Empire ceased after 14 August 1947. As the last Grand Master of the orders, the Earl Mountbatten of Burma was also the last known individual to have publicly worn the stars of a Knight Grand Commander of both orders, during the Queen's Silver Jubilee celebrations in 1977. There are no living members of the order.

- The last Grand Master of the Order was Rear Admiral The 1st Viscount Mountbatten of Burma (later promoted and created Admiral of the Fleet, 1st Earl Mountbatten of Burma; 1900–1979), the last Viceroy of India and the first Governor General of the newly independent Union (or Dominion) of India. Lord Mountbatten was killed in an IRA bombing in County Sligo on 27 August 1979.
- The last surviving GCIE, Maharaja Sri Sir Chithira Thirunal Balarama Varma (1912–1991), the Maharaja of Travancore, died on 19 July 1991 in Trivandrum.
- The last surviving KCIE, Maharaja Sri Sir Mayurdwajsinhji Meghrajsinhji III Maharaja of Dhrangadhra (1923–2010), the Maharaja of Dhrangadhra-Halvad, died at Dhrangadhra on 1 August 2010.
- The last surviving CIE, Sir Ian Dixon Scott (1909–2002), died on 3 March 2002.

The fictional characters Purun Dass, invented by Rudyard Kipling, and Harry Paget Flashman, invented by George MacDonald Fraser, were KCIEs; Kipling's engineer Findlayson in The Day's Work (1908) aspires to the CIE.

== Composition ==
The British sovereign serves as Sovereign of the Order. The grand master held the next-most senior rank; the position was held, ex officio, by the viceroy of India. Members of the first class were titled "Knight Grand Commander" rather than "Knight Grand Cross" so as not to offend the non-Christian Indians appointed to the order.

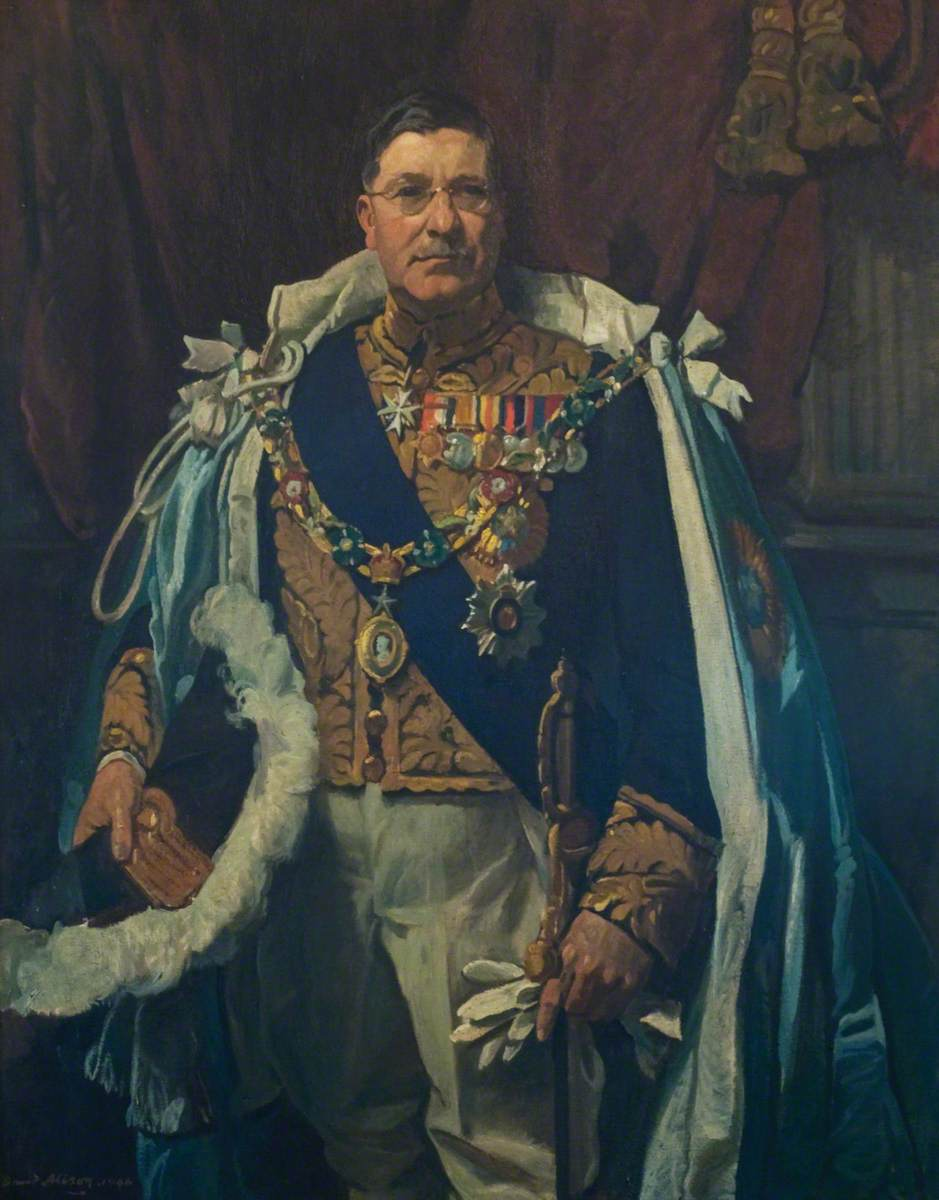
Lord Erskine GCSI GCIE, wearing the mantle of the Order of the Star of India and the sash and star of the Order of the Indian Empire

At the time of foundation in 1878 the order had only one class, that of Companion, with no quota imposed. In 1886, the Order was divided into the two classes of knights commander (50 at any given time) and companions (no quota). The following year the class of Knight Grand Commander (25 at any given time) was added; the composition of the other two classes remained the same. The statute also provided that it was "competent for Her Majesty, Her heirs and successors, at Her or their pleasure, to appoint any Princes of the Blood Royal, being descendants of His late Majesty King George the First, as Extra Knights Grand Commander".

By Letters Patent of 2 Aug 1886, the number of knights commander was increased to 82, while commanders were limited to 20 nominations per year (40 for 1903 only). Membership was expanded by letters patent of 10 June 1897, which permitted up to 32 knights grand commander. A special statute of 21 October 1902 permitted up to 92 knights commander, but continued to limit the number of nominations of commanders to 20 in any successive year. On 21 December 1911, in connection with the Delhi Durbar, the limits were increased to 40 knights grand commander, 120 knights commander, and 40 nominations of companions in any successive year.

British officials and soldiers were eligible for appointment, as were rulers of Indian Princely States. Generally, the rulers of the more important states were appointed knights grand commander of the Order of the Star of India, rather than of the Order of the Indian Empire. Women, save the princely rulers, were ineligible for appointment to the order. Female princely rulers were admitted as "knights" rather than as "dames" or "ladies". Other Asian and Middle Eastern rulers were also appointed as well.

== Vestments and insignia ==
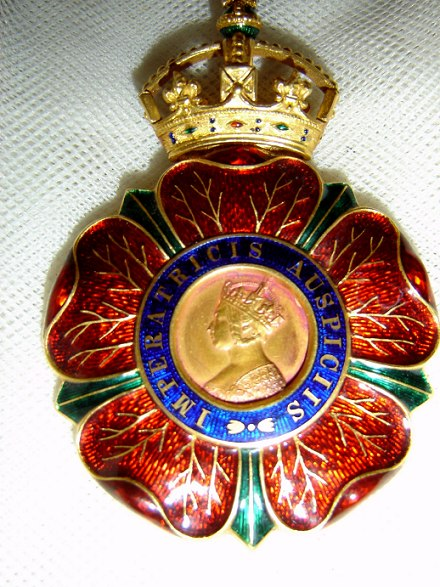
Photo of Sir Mokshagundam Visvesvarayya's badge

Members of the order wore elaborate costumes on important ceremonial occasions:

- The mantle, worn only by knights grand commander, comprised dark blue satin lined with white silk. On the left side was a representation of the star (see photo at right).
- The collar, also worn only by knights grand commander, was made of gold. It was composed of alternating golden elephants, Indian roses and peacocks.

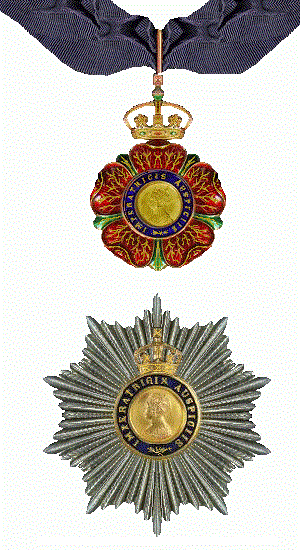
The insignia of a Knight Commander of the Most Eminent Order of the Indian Empire (KCIE)

At less important occasions, simpler insignia were used:

- The star, worn only by knights grand commander and knights commander, had ten points, including rays of gold and silver for knights grand commander, and of plain silver for knights commander. In the centre was an image of Victoria surrounded by a dark blue ring with the motto and surmounted by a crown.
- The badge was worn by knights grand commander on a dark blue riband, or sash, passing from the right shoulder to the left hip, and by knights commander and companions from a dark blue ribbon around the neck. It included a five-petalled crown-surmounted red flower, with the image of Victoria surrounded by a dark blue ring with the motto at the centre.

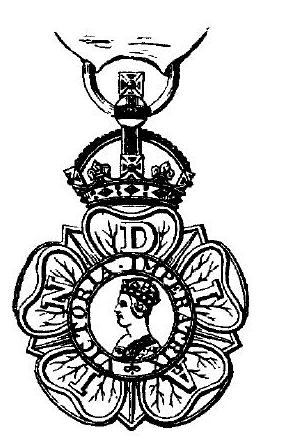
Insignia of the Order

The insignia of most other British chivalric orders incorporate a cross; the Order of the Indian Empire does not, in deference to India's non-Christian tradition.

== Precedence and privileges ==
Members of all classes of the order were assigned positions in the order of precedence. Wives of members of all classes also featured on the order of precedence, as did sons, daughters and daughters-in-law of knights grand commander and knights commander. (See order of precedence in England and Wales for the exact positions.)

Knights grand commander used the post-nominal "GCIE", knights commander "KCIE", and companions "CIE." Knights grand commander and knights commander were entitled to the prefix "Sir". Wives of knights grand commander and knights commander could prefix "Lady" to their surnames. Such forms were not used by peers and Indian princes, except when the names of the former were written out in their fullest forms.

Knights grand commander were also entitled to receive heraldic supporters, and could encircle their arms with a depiction of the circlet (a circle bearing the motto) and the collar; the former is shown either outside or on top of the latter. Knights commander and companions were permitted to display the circlet, but not the collar, surrounding their arms. The badge is depicted suspended from the collar or circlet.

== Notable appointees ==
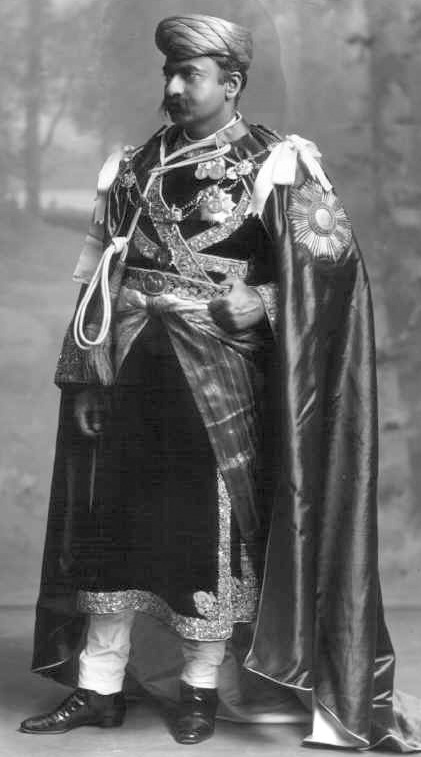
Maharaja Thakore Shri Sir Bhagwatsinhji Sagramji Sahib Bahadur, Maharaja of Gondal GCSI, GCIE, in a 1911 photograph, during his visit to London for the coronation of King George V. He is wearing the mantle, collar and star of a Knight Grand Commander of the Order of the Indian Empire.

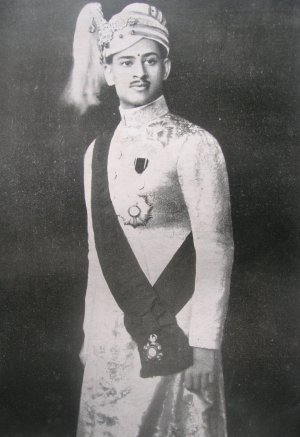
Maharaja Sri Sir Chithira Thirunal Balarama Varma III, Maharaja of the Kingdom of Travancore, GCSI, GCIE, wearing the sash, star and badge of a Knight Grand Commander of the Order of the Indian Empire (GCIE)

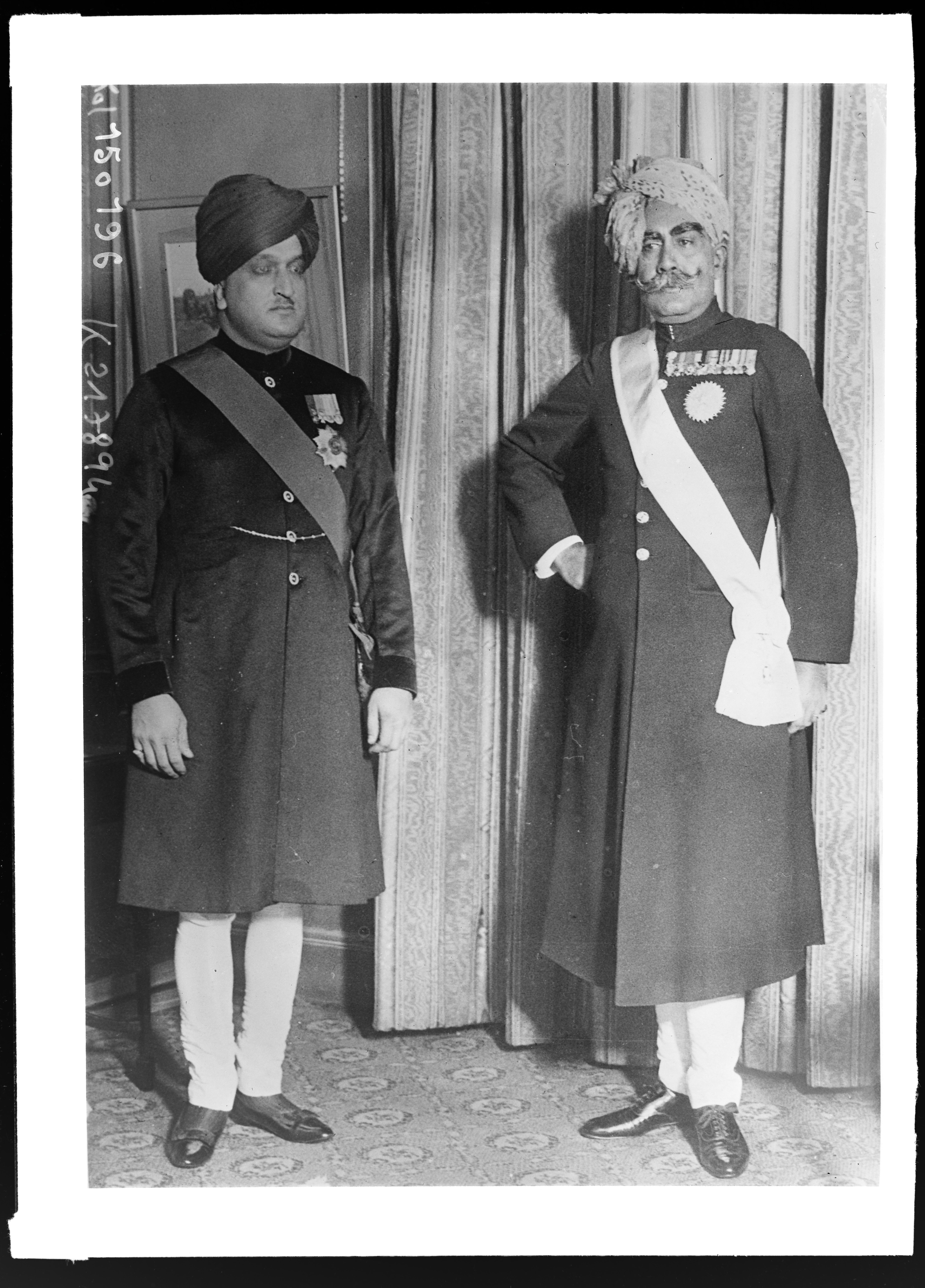
(L to R)] Maharaja Hari Singh GCSI, GCIE J&K, Maharaja Ganga Singh GCSI, GCIE Bikaner in a 1930 photograph, during their visit to London for representing Princes to King George V during First Round Table Conference. Maharaja Hari Singh is wearing the sash, star and badge of a Knight Grand Commander of the Order of the Indian Empire and Maharaja Ganga Singh is wearing the sash, star and badge of a Knight Grand Commander of the Order of the Star of India.

- In 1931 The Raja Dhau Raghubir Bakshi Singh was created a Companion of the Most Eminent Order of the Indian Empire and was given the title of C.I.E. He was the Raja of Bharatpur and reigned from 27 March 1929 to 15 August 1947. He was also senior member of the council and president (c. 1922-23).
- On 1 January 1883, the Raja Mir Syed Muhammad Baquar Ali Khan was created a Companion of the Most Eminent Order of the Indian Empire and was given the title of C.I.E. He was the Mir of Kotaha and the Raja of Morni and Pindrawal
- 1933 Khan Bahadur Sir Mohammad Usman of Madras was conferred the title of Knight Commander Order of the Indian Empire. Sir Mohammad Usman became the first Indian acting Governor of Madras Presidency and a member of the Viceroy’s Executive Council. On 14 June 1945, he was appointed a KCSI. Usman Road, a thoroughfare in T. Nagar, Chennai is named after him.

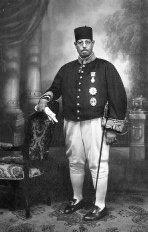
Khan Bahadur Sir Muhammad Usman of Madras KCSI KCIE in his official regalia, photographed for his official picture as Governor of Madras Presidency 1934.

The first two kings of Bhutan were presented with the KCIE:

- Ugyen Wangchuck, the first King, received the KCIE in 1905 from John Claude White, the first Political Officer in Gangtok, Sikkim. He was promoted to a GCIE in 1921.
- Jigme Wangchuck, the second King, received the KCIE in 1931 from Lieutenant-Colonel J.L.R. Weir, also the Political Officer in Gangtok at the time.

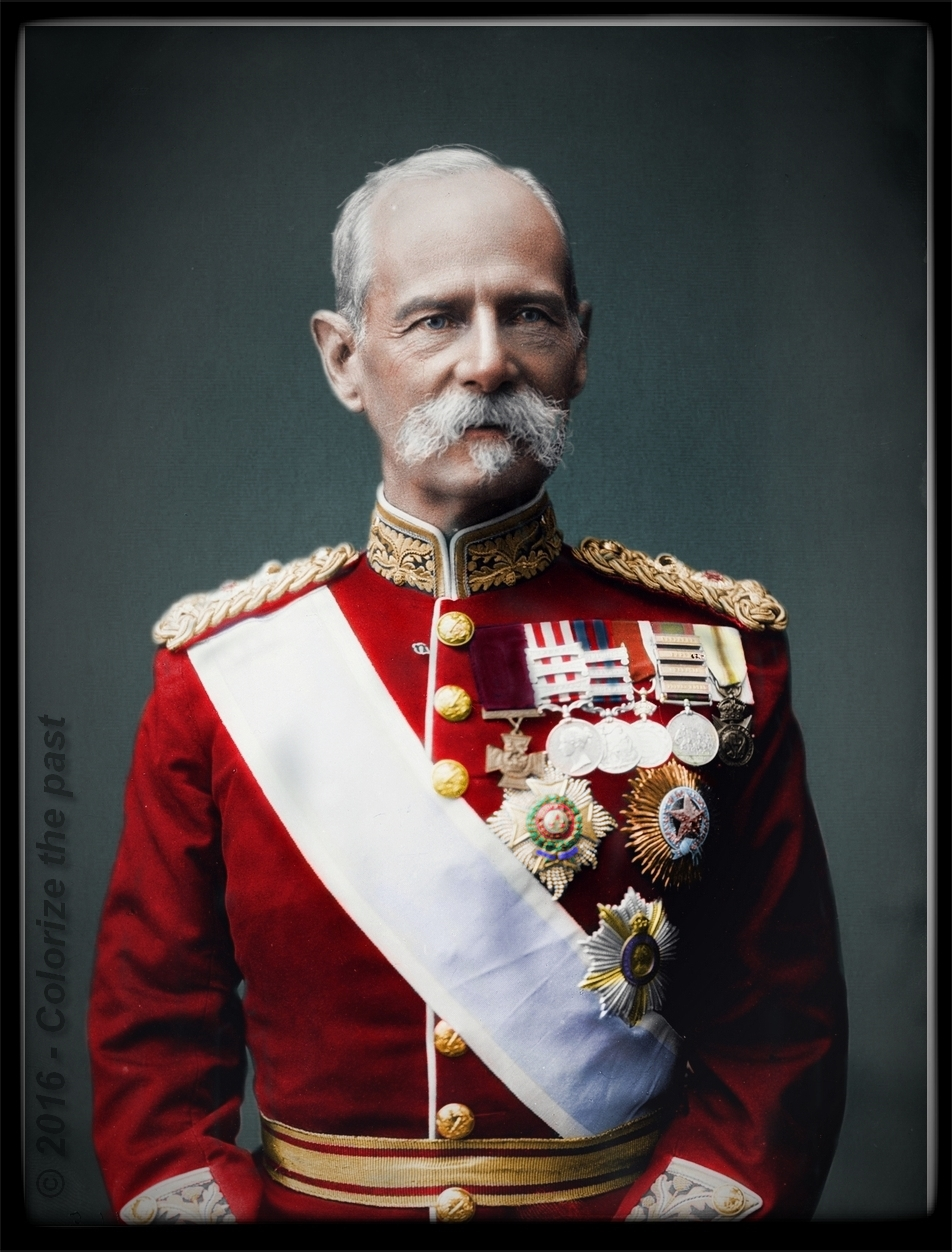
Field Marshal Lord Roberts wearing GCSI and GCIE stars

Other appointees include:

- Sheikh Khaz'al Khan of Mohammerah received the GCIE in 1916, promoted from a KCIE in 1910.
- Raja Sir S. Ramaswami Mudaliar was made a CIE on 6 June 1885.
- Mahamahopadhyay Pandit Mahesh Chandra Nyayratna Bhattacharyya of Calcutta, eminent Sanskrit scholar, principal of the Sanskrit College, academic administrator, philanthropist and social reformer. He was made a Companion of the Most Eminent Order of the Indian Empire (CIE) on 24 May 1881, six years before the title of Mahamahopadhyay was conferred as a personal distinction on the occasion of the Jubilee of the reign of Queen Victoria, for eminence in oriental learning. He was arguably the first Bengali CIE. The titles entitled him to take rank in the Durbar immediately after titular Rajas.
- Prabhu Narayan Singh of Benares, The Maharaja of Benares from the Royal House of Benares received the KCIE in 1892.

Sir Kumarapuram Seshadri Iyer (1 June 1845 – 13 September 1901), who served as the 15th Diwan of Mysore from 1883 to 1901 was also awarded KCIE.

- Sir M. Visvesvaraya, a notable Engineer and Statesman, who served as the 19th Diwan of Mysore from 1912 to 1918, received the KCIE from King George V in 1915.
- Sir V. Bhashyam Aiyangar, The first Indian to be appointed Advocate-General of the Madras Presidency and Law member of the executive council of the Governor of Madras between 1897 and 1900, was created as a CIE in 1895, however his later promotion to the rank of Knight Bachelor in 1900 often overshadows his CIE status.
- Mahadev Govind Ranade, a distinguished Indian scholar, social reformer and author. He was a founding member of the Indian National Congress[1] and owned several designations as member of the Bombay legislative council, member of the finance committee at the centre, and the judge of Bombay High Court. In 1897, Ranade served on a committee charged with the task of enumerating imperial and provincial expenditure and making recommendations for financial retrenchment. This service won him the decoration of CIE.
- Sir Jadunath Sarkar, a distinguished Indian Bengali historian and aristocrat.
- Nawab Sir Khwaja Salimullah Bahadur of Dhaka Knight Grand Commander of the Order of the Indian Empire (GCIE) – 23 December 1911, Knight Commander of the Order of the Star of India (KCSI) – New Year Honours, 1909, Companion of the Order of the Star of India (CSI) – New Year Honours, 1906.
- Abdul Karim, "the Munshi", Queen Victoria's favourite Indian servant, was created a CIE.

Another C.I.E was John Malaise Graham, from the Royal Scots Greys for service. Received in 1947.

- Nawab Sir Imam Buksh Khan Mazari, Nawab of Rojhan Mazari
- Babu Mahendranath Roy, a distinguished lawyer and educationist, the first elected chairman of the Howrah Municipal Corporation was made a CIE in 1914.
- Rao Bahadur Kanti Chandra Mukharji (Chief Member of the Jaipur State council, Member of the Famine Commission of India)was made a CIE in 1891.
- Nawaab Syed Shamsul Huda was made a KCIE in 1916.
- Jagadish Chandra Bose was made a CIE in 1903.
- Sir Md. Azizul Haque was made a CIE in 1937.
- Khwaja Nazimuddin was made a KCIE in 1934, promoted from a CIE in 1926
- C.D. Deshmukh was appointed a CIE in 1937.
- Sir Narayanan R. Pillai, a member of the ICS and later the first Secretary of External Affairs of India, was appointed a CIE in 1939 and knighted with the KCIE in 1946.
- Benegal Rama Rau was appointed a CIE in 1931.
- Colonel Rao Bahadur Thakur Sir Sadul Singh of Rora was appointed a CIE in 1920.
- Atul Chandra Chatterjee was appointed a CIE in 1919, knighted with the KCIE in 1925 and promoted to a GCIE in 1933.
- Bashir Hussain Zaidi was appointed a CIE in 1941.
- Iskander Mirza was made a CIE in 1945.
- Sheikh Isa ibn Ali Al Khalifa, Ruler of Bahrain, was made a KCIE in 1919, as was his son, Sheikh Hamad ibn Isa Al Khalifa (1872–1942) in 1935. His grandson, Sheikh Salman ibn Hamad Al Khalifa (1895–1961), was also made a KCIE in 1943.
- Nawab Sayyid Hassan Ali Mirza Khan Bahadur, Nawab of Murshidabad, received the KCIE in 1887 and was promoted to a GCIE in 1890.
- Maharaja Rameshwar Prasad Singh of Singrauli, received the GCIE on 8 October 1945, for his contribution to both the World Wars
- Emperor Gojong of Korea received the GCIE in 1900.
- Lakhajirajsinhji II Bavajirajsinhji, 12th Thakore Saheb of Rajkot, was created a KCIE in 1908.
- Sheikh Mubarak Al Sabah, the 7th ruler of the Sheikhdom of Kuwait received the KCIE in 1911. His grandson, the 10th Ruler of the Sheikhdom of Kuwait Sheikh Ahmad Al-Jaber Al-Sabah received one in 1930, promoted from a CIE in 1922.
- Raja of Panagal, Premier of Madras from 1921 to 1926 was awarded a CIE and later made KCIE.
- Maharaja Sir Mohan Shamsher Jang Bahadur Rana of Nepal received the GCIE in 1945, promoted from a KCIE in 1924.
- Faisal bin Turki, Sultan of Muscat and Oman, received the GCIE in 1903. His son, Taimur bin Faisal, received the KCIE in 1926 and his grandson, Said bin Taimur, received the GCIE in 1945.
- Raja Sir Martanda Bhairava Tondaiman Bahadur, Raja of Pudukkottai was appointed GCIE on 1 January 1913.
- William Robert Cornish, Surgeon-General—head of medical services—in the Madras Presidency.
- John Thomas Donovan, late of the Indian Civil Service was appointed CIE in 1931.
- Gopal Krishna Gokhale was made CIE.

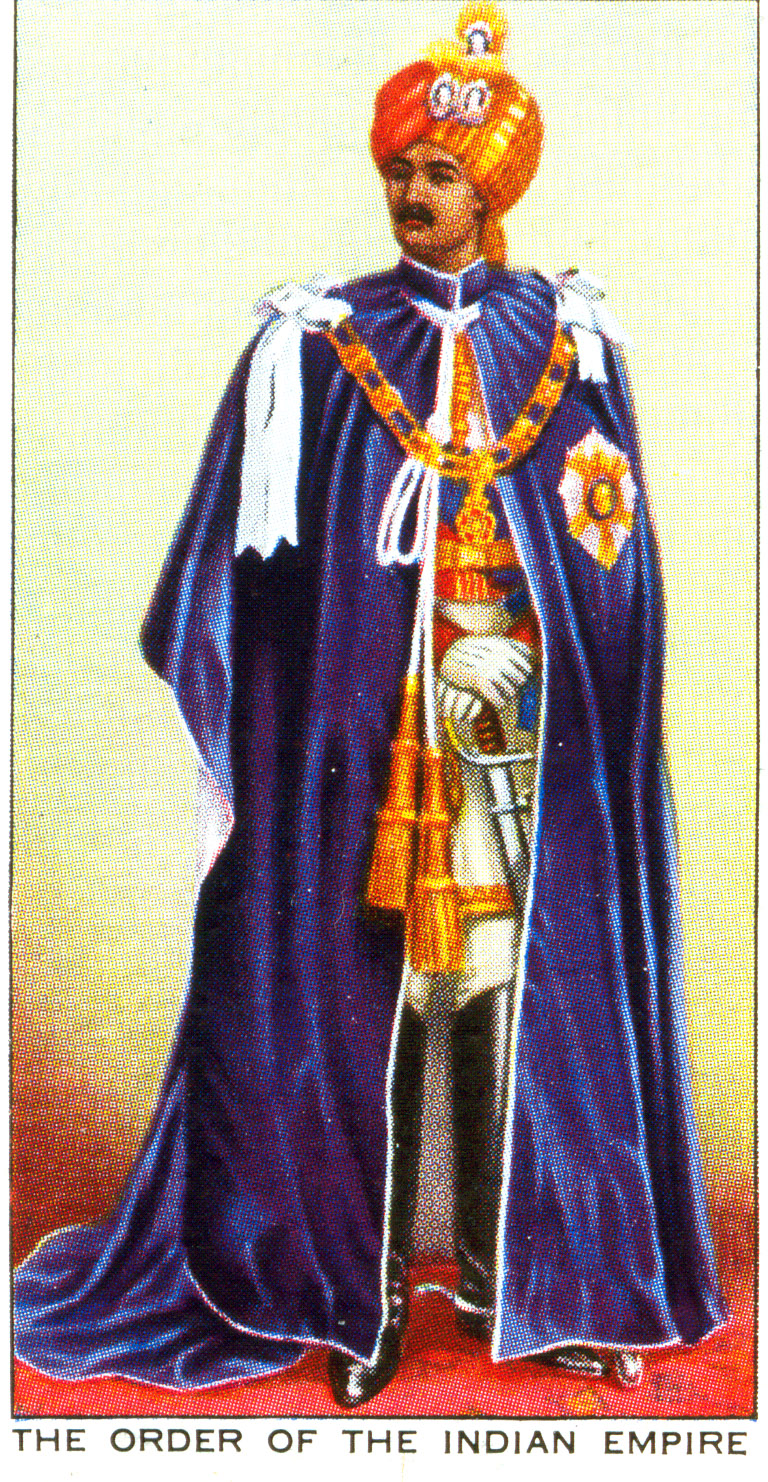
Mantle worn by GCIE

- Rajandhari Sinha of Dharhara Estate was made the CIE in 1943. He was the Mayor of Patna, 1954-57.
- Khan Bahadur Maj.Gen. Fateh Naseeb Khan CIE, January 1931 (Alwar State Forces)
- Sir C. P. Ramaswami Iyer, Law Member of India and Dewan of Travancore from 1936 to 1947 was appointed a CIE in 1923 and knighted with the KCIE in 1926. He was also a recipient of KCSI.
- Francis Spring, the civil engineer, was made a KCIE.
- Leonard William Reynolds, the Agent to the Governor General was made a KCIE.
- Nawab Muhammad Ali Beg, Sir Afsar Ul Mulk, MVO (1906), CIE (1887), Commander in Chief of the Armed Forces of the Nizam of Hyderabad was promoted to the rank of KCIE by His Majesty King Edward VII in the 1908 Birthday Honours
- H. V. Nanjundaiah acting dewan of mysore, Privy councillor to the Maharaja of Mysore and first Vice Chancellor of the Mysore University was awarded the CIE in 1915
- Sardar Bahadur Sir Shamsher Singh Grewal KCIE, Diwan of Jind state during the reign of Raja-I-Rajgan Maharaja Raghbir Singh
- Waldemar Haffkine, developer of the first vaccines against cholera and bubonic plague, was knighted to the CIE in 1897.
- Major General J. G. Elliott, Military Secretary of the Defence Committee of the Indian Government on 1 December 1946. Was made C.I.E 1 January 1948.
- Maharaja Lakshmeshwar Singh, Maharaja of Darbhanga. On 22 June 1897, he was advanced to the rank of Knight Grand Commander.

=== In fiction ===
- The Miracle of Purun Bhaghat, the second story in The Second Jungle Book by Rudyard Kipling, tells how "Sir Purun Dass, K.C.I.E.", "prime minister of one of the semi-independent native States in the north-western part of [British India]", one day retired from the mundane world and became a hermit in his native Himalayas, where after some time he saves a village from a rockslide and dies in the event.
