= Basu =

Surname list

Basu (Bengali: বসু, Bengali: [bɔʃu]), also Bose (anglicized), Boshu, Bosu, or Bosh, is a Bengali Kayastha surname originating from the Bengal region of the Indian subcontinent. The name stems from Vāsu (Sanskrit: वसु), which means 'Bright one'.

Basus are considered as Kulin Kayasthas of Gautam gotra, along with Ghoshes, Mitras and Bangaja (Eastern Bengal) Guhas.

== Notable people ==
- Amrita Basu, (b. 1953) American scholar
- Amar Bose, (1929 – 2013) Founder and chairman of Bose Corporation which make Bose home audio products. Indian American entrepreneur and academic. Professor at the Massachusetts Institute of Technology (MIT).
- Anurag Basu film director
- Bani Basu, (b. 1939), Bengali Indian author, essayist, critic, and poet
- Benoy Basu, (1908–1930), Indian revolutionary and freedom fighter
- Bipasha Basu, Bollywood actress and model
- Buddhadeb Bosu, (1908–1974), Bengali writer
- Chandranath Basu, (1844–1910), Bengali conservative litterateur
- Debabrata Basu, (1924 - 2001) Indian statistician who proved Basu's theorem
- Durga Das Basu, (1910 - 1997), Indian jurist and lawyer who wrote the Commentary on the Constitution of India and Casebook on the Indian Constitutional Law
- Jagadish Chandra Bose, (1858 - 1937), Biologist, physicist, botanist and an early writer of science fiction. One of the fathers of radio science, inventor of crescograph, founder of Bose Institute.
- Jyoti Basu, (1914–2010), founding member of the Communist Party of India (Marxist) . Barrister, longest serving chief minister of West Bengal.
- Jyotirmoy Basu, (1920–1982), Indian politician for CPM party .
- Kaushik Basu, (b. 1952), Indian economist
- Khudiram Bose, (1889–1908), Indian Freedom Fighter
- Kumudini Basu (1873–1942), Bengali writer, social reformer and women's rights activist in British India.
- Kunal Basu, author of the novel Racists
- Maladhar Basu, a poet of the Hossain-Shahi period in Bengal history, writer of Sri Krishna Vijaya (শ্রীকৃষ্ণবিজয়, Triumph of Lord Krishna)
- Mankumari Basu (1863–1943), Bengali poet
- Neil Basu (b. 1968), senior British police officer.
- Nagendranath Basu (1866–1938), encyclopedia compiler, archaeologist, and historian
- Nandita Basu, Indian-born American environmental engineer
- Nandalal Bose, seminal painter and sculptor
- Pam Basu (1958–1992), victim of carjacking and murder
- Rajnarayan Basu, (1826–1899), writer and intellectual of the Bengal Renaissance
- Rajshekhar Basu (1880–1960), Bengali writer, chemist and lexicographer
- Rash Behari Basu (1886–1945), Indian Revolutionary Leader
- Samaresh Basu, writer; winner of the 1980 Sahitya Akademi Award
- Samit Basu, (b. 1979), Indian author
- Sankar Basu, electrical engineer
- Satyendra Nath Bose, (1894 – 1974), Indian mathematician and physicist. Best known for his work on quantum mechanics, Bose–Einstein statistics and Bose–Einstein condensate. Elementary particles Bosons were named after him.
- Satyendranath Bosu, (1882–1908), Indian revolutionary and freedom fighter
- Sekhar Basu, (1952–2020), Indian nuclear scientist who served as the chairman of the Atomic Energy Commission, Awarded the Padma Shri in 2014
- Siddhartha Basu, Indian television producer-director and quiz show host
- Sreyashi Jhumki Basu, (1977–2008) American science educator
- Subhas Chandra Bose, (1897–1945), Indian nationalist leader

== See also ==
- Sakyu and Inkyu Basu a.k.a. the Basu Sisters, characters from Yandere Simulator
- Jyoti Basu (disambiguation)
