= Ghose =

Origin
- Origin: Bengali Hindu
- Region of origin: Bengal

Ghose (Bengali: ঘোষ) is a native Bengali surname that is found among the Bengali Hindu community of India and Bangladesh. Historically, Ghoses were part of the Kulin Kayasthas of Soukalin gotra, along with Boses, Mitras, and Bangaja (Eastern Bengal) Guhas. A popular alternative spelling is Ghosh.

== Notable people with the surname ==
- Ajoy Ghose, Indian mining engineer
- Anindya Ghose (born c. 1974), Indian-born American business academic
- Arundhati Ghose (1939–2016), Indian diplomat
- Aurobindo Ghose or Ghosh, known as Sri Aurobindo (1872–1950), Indian philosopher, yogi, guru, poet and nationalist
- Chinmoy Kumar Ghose, known as Sri Chinmoy (1931–2007), Indian spiritual leader
- Debasish Ghose (born 1960), Indian engineer and academic
- Dilip Ghose (born 1932), Indian cricketer
- Gopal Ghose (1913–1980), Indian painter from West Bengal
- Goutam Ghose (born 1950), film director, music director and cinematographer
- Ila Ghose (1930–2019), Indian mechanical engineer from West Bengal
- Katie Ghose (born 1970), British campaigner and lawyer
- Manmohan Ghose (1869–1924), Indian poet writing in English, brother of Sri Aurobindo
- Monomohun Ghose (1844–1896), first practicing barrister of Indian origin
- Nilima Ghose (born 1935), female track athlete from India and Olympian
- Parbati Ghose (1933–2018), Indian actress, film director and film producer
- Partha Ghose (born 1939), Indian physicist, author, philosopher and musician
- Pinaki Chandra Ghose (born 1952), judge and Lokpal of India
- Sagarika Ghose (born 1964), Indian journalist, news anchor and author
- Sanjoy Ghose (1959–1997), Indian rural development activist
- Santi Ghose (1916–1989), Indian nationalist assassin
- Saroj Ghose (1935–2025), Indian science popularizer and museum founder
- Saumendra Kumar Ghose (born 1964), Mayor of the city of Cuttack, Odisha state, India
- Shohini Ghose, astrophysicist
- Subiman Ghose (1906–1969), Indian politician
- Surendra Mohan Ghose (1893–1976), Indian politician
- Zulfikar Ghose (1935–2022), Pakistani American writer and poet

== See also ==
- Ghosh
