= Sudip =

Sudip is an Indian and Nepali masculine given name.

People with the name include:

- Sudip Bandyopadhyay (b. 1952), Indian politician
- Sudip Roy Barman, Indian politician
- Sudip Datta Bhaumik (d. 2017), Indian journalist
- Sudip Bose, American emergency physician
- Sudip Chatterjee, multiple people
- Sudip Chattopadhyay (b. 1960), Indian biologist
- Sudip Kumar Gharami (b. 1999), Indian cricketer
- Sudip Mazumder, computer engineer
- Sudip Kumar Mukherjee, Indian politician
- Sudip Roy, Indian artist
- Sudip Sharma, Indian screenwriter
