= Doniach =

Doniach is a surname. Notable people with the surname include:

- Deborah Doniach (1912–2004), clinical immunologist and pioneer in the field of autoimmune diseases
- Israel Doniach M.D., F.R.C.P. (1911–2001), pathologist and expert on the causes and diagnosis of thyroid cancers
- Nakdimon S. Doniach OBE (1907–1994), lexicographer and scholar of Judaic and Semitic languages
- Sebastian Doniach (born 1934), British-American physicist and professor at Stanford University
