= Mitra (surname) =

Origin
- Origin: Bengali Hindu
- Region of origin: Bengal

Mitra (Bengali: মিত্র) is a Bengali Hindu surname found mostly amongst the Bengali Kayastha community and occasionally among other communities like Barujibi in the Bengal region of the Indian subcontinent. The last name may have been derived either from the Sanskrit word Mitra, meaning friend or ally, or from the name of an important Indo-Iranian deity in the Vedas and in ancient Iran.

According to GK Ghosh, some Bengali last names like Mitra were adopted from Buddhist tradition. Mitras are considered as Kulin Kayasthas of Vishvamitra gotra, along with Bose, Ghosh, and Bangaja (Eastern Bengal) Guha.

== Notables ==
Notable people with the surname, who may or may not be affiliated to the clan, include:

- Aditi Mitra, American theoretical condensed matter physicist known for her research on molecular scale electronics and non-equilibrium quantum systems
- Amit Mitra, politician and current Finance Minister of West Bengal
- Ashok Mitra, finance minister of West Bengal
- Asoke Chandra Mitra, Indian politician and member of the Communist Party of India (Marxist)
- Asoke Nath Mitra, known for his work in nuclear physics, particle physics and quantum field theory and in particular, for his fundamental contributions in obtaining the exact solution of the nucleon 3-body problem
- Abhik Mitra, Indian cricketer
- Ashesh Prasad Mitra, physicist who headed the National Physics Laboratory in Delhi, India and was the Director General of the Council of Scientific and Industrial Research
- Amit Mitra, Indian politician
- Amitabh Mitra, poet and artist, South Africa
- Antara Mitra, Indian singer
- Arun Mitra (1909–2000), Indian Bengali-language poet
- Ayushman Mitra, Indian fashion designer, painter, and actor from Kolkata.
- Bhupendra Nath Mitra KCSI KCIE CBE (October 1875 – 25 February 1937), Indian government official and diplomat who served as the third Indian High Commissioner to the United Kingdom from 1931 to 1936.
- Bimal Mitra (1912–1991), Indian Bengali-language writer
- Biren Mitra, Indian politician, a leader of the Indian National Congress and the Chief Minister of Odisha
- Chandan Mitra (born 1955), Indian journalist, editor/managing director of The Pioneer newspaper
- Chittaranjan Mitra (1926–2008), Indian scientist and director of BITS Pilani
- Debasis Mitra (born 1944), Indian mathematician
- Debala Mitra, Indian archaeologist who served as Director General of the Archaeological Survey of India (ASI)
- Debu Mitra, Indian cricketer
- Digambar Mitra (1817–1879), Indian businessman who served as Sheriff of Kolkata
- Dinabandhu Mitra (1830–1873), Indian Bengali-language dramatist
- Falguni Mitra, Indian Hindustani classical vocalist who is known as a Dhrupad exponent of India.
- Gautam Mitra, Computer Scientist
- Hiran Mitra (born 1945), Indian artist
- Ila Mitra, Indian communist and peasants movement organizer of the Indian subcontinent, especially in East Bengal (now Bangladesh).
- Indraneel Mittra (born 1943), Indian cancer researcher
- Kalikrishna Mitra (1822–1891), Indian philanthropist, educator and writer. He established the first non-government girls’ school in India.
- Kamal Mitra (1912–1993), Indian actor
- Kishori Chand Mitra, writer, civil servant and social worker
- Krishna Kumar Mitra (1852–1936), Indian freedom fighter, journalist and leader of the Brahmo Samaj
- Koena Mitra (born 1981), Indian actress and former model
- Lopamudra Mitra, Indian Bengali-language singer-songwriter
- Mahan Mitra (born 1968), also known as Mahan Maharaj and Swami Vidyanathananda, Indian mathematician and monk of the Ramakrishna Order
- Nabagopal Mitra (1840–1894), Indian playwright, poet, essayist, patriot
- Narendranath Mitra(1916–1975), Indian Bengali-language writer, poet
- Nilmani Mitra, Indian civil engineer and architect, who designed the famous mansions of 19th century Kolkata.
- Panchanan Mitra (1892–1936), professor of anthropology in India
- Partha Mitra, American neuroscientist and computer scientist
- Peary Chand Mitra, Indian writer, journalist, cultural activist and entrepreneur.
- Prabir Mitra (1941–2025), Bangladeshi movie and TV actor
- Pramathanath Mitra, known widely as P. Mitra, was an Indian barrister and nationalist
- Premendra Mitra (1904–1988), Indian Bengali-language poet and author
- Raja Mitra (1945–2024), Indian film director and music director
- Rajendralal Mitra (1823/24-1891), the first modern Indologist of Indian origin
- Ramon Mitra, Jr., Filipino statesman, diplomat, and a renowned pro-democracy activist
- Rana Mitter OBE FBA (born 1969), known as Rana Mitter, is a British historian and political scientist of Indian origin who specialises in the history of republican China.
- Raul Mitra, Filipino composer, arranger, songwriter, musical director, pianist, and keyboardist
- Rhona Mitra (born 1976), English actress
- Rina Mitra, Chief Commissioner of the West Bengal Right to Public Service Commission
- Saby Mitra, American academic administrator and professor currently serving as the Dean of the University of Florida Warrington College of Business.
- Sanjay Mitra, served as Defense Secretary of India
- Sankar Prasad Mitra, Indian politician and former Chief Justice of the Calcutta High Court
- Sanjoy K. Mitter, Professor in the Department of Electrical Engineering and Computer Science at MIT who is a noted control theorist
- Samik Mitra, Indian professional footballer who plays as a goalkeeper for Chennaiyin
- Samarendra Kumar Mitra, Indian scientist and mathematician who created India's first computer
- Samaresh Mitra (born 1937), Indian bioinorganic chemist and an INSA Senior Scientist at the Indian Institute of Chemical Biology (IICB)
- Shyam Mitra, Indian cricketer
- Shaoli Mitra, Indian Bengali theatre and film actress, director, and playwright. padma shri awardee
- Shyamal Mitra (1929–1987), Bengali singer
- Sisir Kumar Mitra (1890–1963), Indian physicist
- Shrish Chandra Mitra was an Indian revolutionary and active member of Indian independence movement
- Sombhu Mitra (1915–1997), Indian film and stage actor, director, playwright
- Subodh Mitra M.D., F.R.C.S., F.R.C.O.G. (1896-1961) was an Indian obstretrician
- Sreelekha Mitra (born 1975), Indian actress of TV and films
- Subrata Mitra (1930–2001), Indian cinematographer
- Sugata Mitra is an Indian computer scientist and educational theorist. He is best known for his "Hole in the Wall" experiment, and widely cited in works on literacy and education.
- Subrata K. Mitra, director and research professor at the Institute for South Asian Studies at the National University of Singapore
- Subhrajit Mitra, (born 1976), Indian film maker
- Subhasish Mitra from Stanford University was named Fellow of the Institute of Electrical and Electronics Engineers (IEEE) in 2013[1] for contributions to design and test of robust integrated circuits
- Suchitra Mitra (1924–2011), Indian singer-composer
- Sumita Mitra developed the nanomaterials used in state-of-the-art 3M dental composites, which have been used in billions of procedures around the world.
- Sushanta Mitra, Canadian mechanical engineer
- Sushmita Mitra, Indian computer scientist and is currently the head and INAE Chair Professor at the Machine Intelligence Unit at Indian Statistical Institute, Kolkata
- Sugata Mitra, Indian computer scientist and educational theorist
- Swasti Mitter, researcher
- Shibu Mitra, Indian film director and producer
- Parno Mittra, Indian actress who appears in Bengali films
- Tripti Mitra, Indian actress of Bengali theatre and films
- Tapan Mitra (18 July 1948 – 3 February 2019), American economist.

== Fictional characters ==
- Pradosh Chandra Mitter (Feluda), a fictional private investigator created by Satyajit Ray
- Tapesh Ranjan Mitter (Topse), cousin of Feluda, created by Satyajit Ray
