= Hemendra Mohan Bose =

Indian businessman

- হেমেন্দ্রমোহন বসু
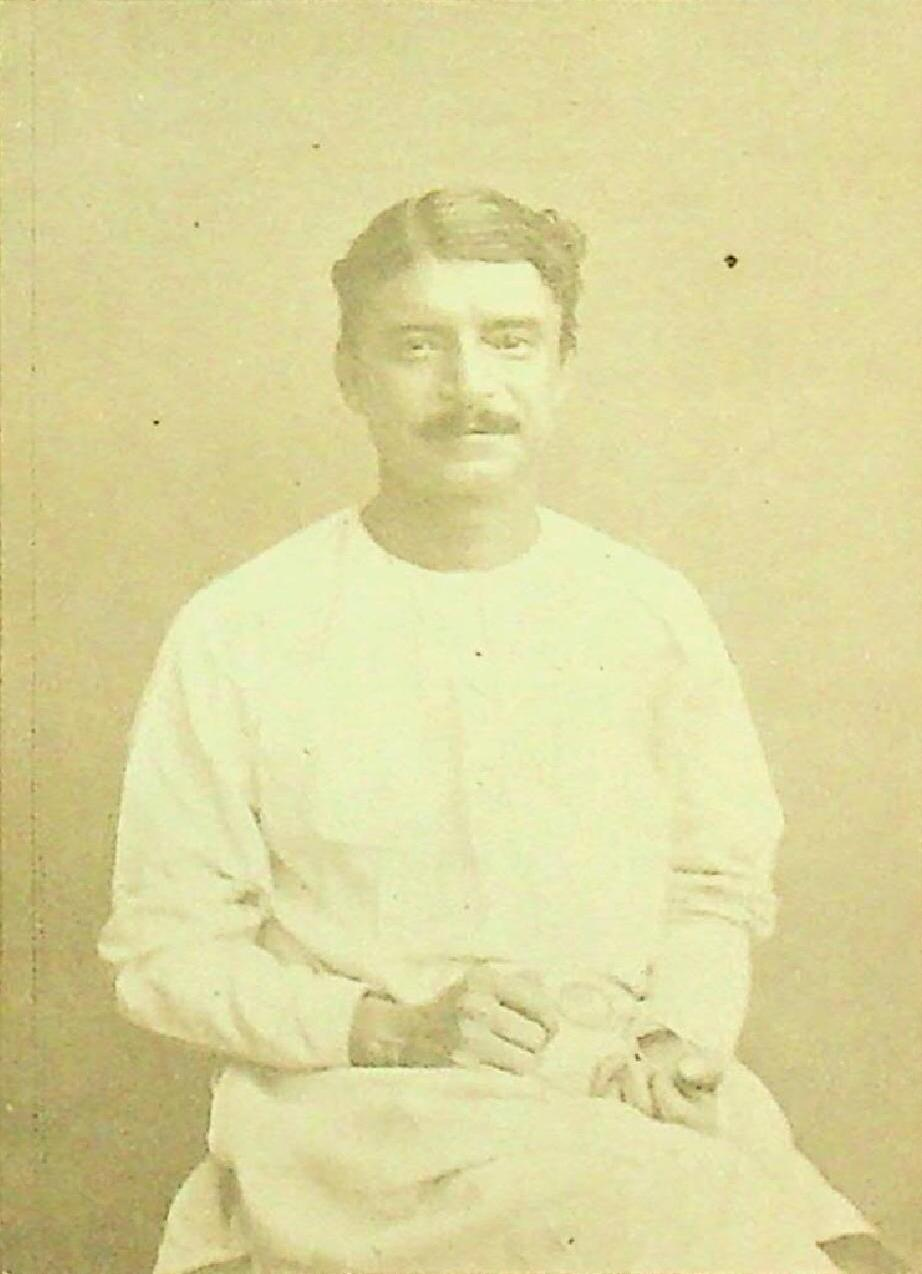
- Pioneering Bengali entrepreneur of Swadeshi movement
- Born: 1864; Mymensingh, Bengal, British Raj
- Died: 28 August 1916 (aged 52); Kolkata, Bengal, British Raj
- Occupation: Swadeshi entrepreneur
- Known for: Pioneer of color photography in India; First Indian-owned cycle works in Calcutta; First Indian-owned automobile distributor in Calcutta; Father of Indian Sound Recording; Creator of the Kuntalin Puroshkar for Bengali literature
- Spouse: Mrinalini Bose
- Children: Jiten Bose, Nitin Bose, Mukul Bose, Bapi Bose, Ganesh Bose, Kartick Bose, Soumendra Mohan Bose, Malati Ghosal
- Parent: Haramohan Basu

Hemendra Mohan Bose (Bengali: হেমেন্দ্রমোহন বসু) (1864 – 28 August 1916) was an Indian entrepreneur, manufacturer of Kuntalin hair oil and Delkhosh brand of perfume. He was the first Indian to manufacture gramophone records. Many of his businesses were spurred on from amateur hobbies and interests in scientific advancements. He was also the pioneer of color photography in India.

== Early life ==
Bose was born in 1866 in Mymensingh, where his father Haramohan Bose used to stay, the ancestral home of the family was in the village of Jaysiddhi, in Mymensingh District. According to Michael Kinnear, Bose was born in 1864 at his ancestral village. After passing I.A. he took admission in the Medical College Kolkata. While a student at the college, he suffered an accident where his eyes were scarred in acid. After recovering, he quit his medical career. In 1890, Bose began experimenting with perfume, and started his move into business.

Bose was married to Mrinalini Debi, the sister of Saradaranjan Ray and Upendrakishore Ray Chowdhury, and therefore a great-uncle of Satyajit Ray by marriage to his great-aunt.

== Career ==
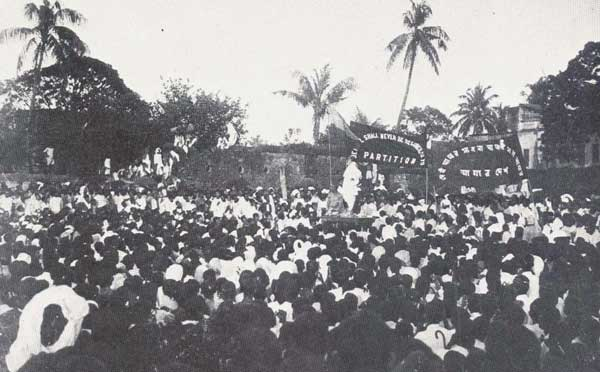
Hemendra Mohan Bose's photography dated 30 Ashvin, 1312 in the time of partition of Bengal (1905)

In 1894, Bose started his own business in perfume manufacturing, the H-Bose Perfumers at 62 Bowbazar Street in Kolkata, where he distilled the perfumes. After the initial success, he added hair oil and other toiletries like lavender water, Eau de Cologne, milk of rose etc. to his range of products. He also set up a new manufacturing unit at 6 Shib Narayan Das Lane in Kolkata. His products included the famous Kuntalin hair oil and Delkhosh perfume.

By 1900, he had created a printing press and publishing house titled Kuntaline Press at 5 Shib Narayan Das Lane in Kolkata which incidentally was next door to his perfume business. In 1903, he instituted the Kuntalin Puraskar and encouraged young writers to showcase their talent. A short story written by Sir Jagadish Chandra Bose was the first recipient of the Kuntalin Puraskar. Later Sarat Chandra Chattopadhyay's first printed publication Mandira won the Kuntalin Puraskar.

Bose was a bicycle enthusiast. He himself could ride the bicycle and taught his friends how to ride it. In 1903, he along with his brother Jatindra Mohon Bose established the first Indian-owned cycle works the H. Bose and Co, - Cycles at 63–1, Harrison Road. The company was also the distributors of the Rover bicycles. It was one of the first among his Swadeshi ventures. He also learnt how to drive a motor car. In 1900, he bought a two-seater motor car from England and used to drive it himself. In 1903 he imported from France a Darracq 8HP single cylinder motor car, and another 2 cylinder Darracq in 1905. He was the proprietor of the first Indian owned automobile distributor in Calcutta, The Great Eastern Motor Company, and employed a British manager. He also set up a repairing unit, the Great Eastern Motor Works in Park Street.

=== Sound recording ===
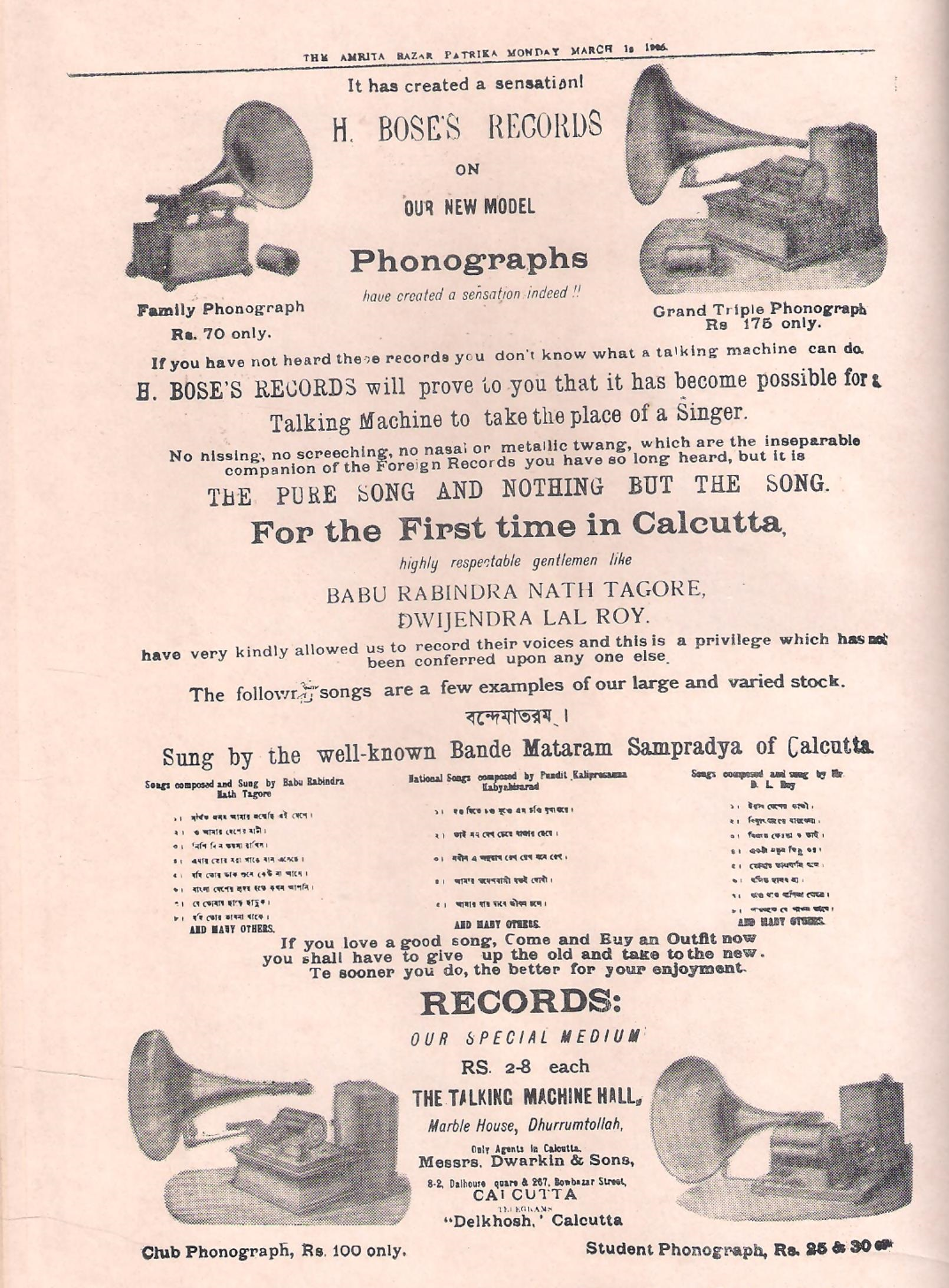
Advertisement of H. M. Bose's gramophone record

In 1900, Bose began to make sound recordings privately, after he had acquired an Edison phonograph. He began recording his friends in a leisurely fashion. Some of the first people recorded by H. Bose included his uncle, Sir Jagadish Chandra Bose, P. C. Roy, and his good friend Rabindranath Tagore. His company became known as "H. Bose's Record" which later became "H. Bose Swadeshi Records". By 1907, the demand for Bose's recordings grew so great that he began producing his own cylinders for recording. H. Bose was a well known patron of the Swadeshi movement and many of his records covered this subject.

== Achievements ==
Bose was the pioneer of color photography in India. He used Autochrome Lumière slides for his photographs. He was the founder president of Sporting Union.
