= Ghosh =

Origin
- Origin: Bengali Hindu
- Region of origin: Bengal

Ghosh (Bengali: ঘোষ) is a native Bengali surname that is found among the Bengali Hindu community of India and Bangladesh. A popular alternative spelling is Ghose.

Ghoshes originally belong to Kayastha caste in Bengal. According to GK Ghosh, some Bengali surnames like Ghosh were adopted from Buddhist tradition. Ghoshes are considered as Kulin Kayasthas of Soukalin gotra, along with Boses, Mitras, and Bangaja (Eastern Bengal) Guhas.

Ghosh surname is in vogue among the Sadgop and Goala/Gowala communities in Bengal.

== Notable people ==
- Sri Aurobindo (1872–1950), birth name Aurobindo Ghose, Indian philosopher
- Barindra Kumar Ghosh (1880–1959), Indian revolutionary and journalist
- Amitav Ghosh (1956–2020), Indian writer
- Amitav Ghosh (banker), Indian banker
- Anindita Ghosh, British historian
- Anirvan Ghosh (born 1964), American neuroscientist
- DJ Talent (born 1978), birth name Anthony Ghosh, British reality television contestant
- Aparna Ghosh, Bangladeshi actress and model
- Atulkrishna Ghosh (1890–1966), Indian revolutionary
- Atulya Ghosh (1904–1986), Indian politician
- Debaprasad Ghosh (1894–1985), Indian politician
- Debendra Nath Ghosh (1890–1999), Bangladeshi politician
- Dhiman Ghosh (born 1987), Bangladeshi cricketer
- Dilip Ghosh (economist), American economist
- Dilip Ghosh (born 1964), Indian politician
- Dipu Ghosh (born 1940), Indian badminton player
- Elise Ghosh (born 2009), Canadian rhythmic gymnast
- Ganesh Ghosh (1900–1994), Bengali Indian independence activist, revolutionary and politician
- Girish Chandra Ghosh (1844–1912), Bengali actor, director, and writer
- Helen Ghosh (born 1956), British civil servant
- Jayanta Kumar Ghosh (1937–2017), Indian statistician
- Jayati Ghosh (born 1955), Indian economist
- Malay Ghosh (born 1944), Indian statistician
- Paramahansa Yogananda (1893–1952), birth name Mukunda Lal Ghosh, Indian yogi and guru
- Opashona Ghosh (born 1987), Indian illustrator and graphic designer
- Pallab Ghosh (born 1962), Indian journalist
- Partho Ghosh (1949–2025), Indian film director and producer
- Prafulla Chandra Ghosh (1891–1983), first Chief Minister of West Bengal, India
- Rabi Ghosh (1931–1997), Indian actor
- Ranjan Ghosh (academic), Indian academic and teacher
- Reshmi Ghosh (born 1978), Indian beauty queen and actress
- Rishab Aiyer Ghosh (born 1975), Dutch journalist, computer scientist and open-source software advocate
- Rituparno Ghosh (1963–2013), Indian film director
- Robin Ghosh (1929–2016), Bangladeshi musician and music composer
- Rudranil Ghosh (born 1973), Indian actor who works primarily in Bengali films
- Samit Ghosh (born 1949), Indian businessman
- Sangita Ghosh (born 1976), Indian actress
- Sarat Kumar Ghosh (1878–1962), Indian civil servant and jurist
- Shankar Ghosh (musician) (1935–2016), Indian tabla player
- Shankha Ghosh (1932–2021), Indian poet
- Shibdas Ghosh (1923–1976), Indian politician
- Shiulie Ghosh (born 1968), British journalist
- Shreela Ghosh (born 1962), Indian arts executive and actor
- Sisir Kumar Ghosh (1840–1911), Indian journalist
- Subodh Ghosh (1909–1980), Indian author and journalist
- Subroto Ghosh (born 1987), Indian cricketer
- Sujoy Ghosh (born 1966), Indian film director, actor and screenwriter
- Sukumar Ranjan Ghosh (1952–2025), Bangladeshi politician
- Taposh Ghosh (born 1991), Bangladeshi cricketer

== See also ==
- Ghose
- R v Ghosh, an English criminal law case
