= Troilokyanath Mukhopadhyay =

Indian public servant

Trailokyanath Mukherjee
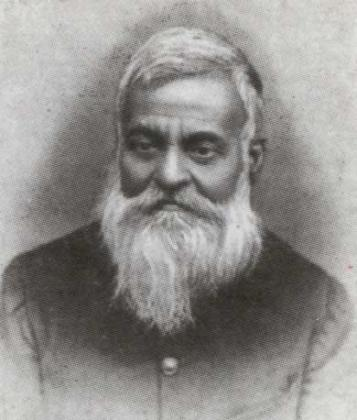
- Troilokyanath Mukhopadhyay
- Born: 22 July 1847; Rahuta, 24 Parganas, Bengal Presidency, Company Raj (now in North 24 Parganas, West Bengal, India)
- Died: 3 November 1919 (aged 72)
- Occupations: public servant, curator of the Indian Museum, writer
- Relatives: Vishwambhar Mukherjee (father)
- Writing career
- Period: 1888–1919
- Genres: Novel, short story
- Notable works: Kankabati; Bhoot O Manush; Damru Charit

Trailokyanath Mukhopadhyay (Trailōkyanātha Mukhōpādhyāẏa, Bengali pronunciation: [t̪ɾoi̯lokːɔnat̪ʰ mukʰopad̪ːʱae̯]; 22 July 1847 – 3 November 1919) or T. N. Mukharji in British Indian Government records, was an Indian public servant who served as a curator of the Indian Museum at Calcutta, and was an author who wrote both in English and Bengali. He was in-charge of organizing exhibits for the Calcutta International Exhibition of 1883, the Amsterdam Exhibition in the same year, the 1886 Colonial and Indian Exhibition, and the 1888 Glasgow International Exhibition. His travels in Europe as part of this was published as a popular travelogue A Visit to Europe (1889).

== Life ==
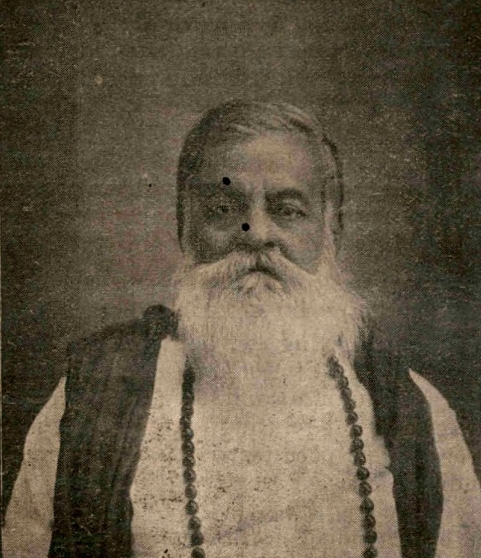

Trailokyanath was born in the village of Rahuta, near Shyamnagar in the North 24 Parganas district of West Bengal. Attending school in Hugli-Chuchura and Bhadreswar but largely self-taught, he became a school teacher in Daroka (Birbhum), Ukhra, Raniganj and in Sahajadpur, Sirajganj. From 1868 he served as a police sub-inspector in Cuttack (1868). Having learned Oriya, he joined Bhagavati Charan Das's Utkal Subhakari as editor. Later meeting Sir William Hunter, the compiler of A Statistical Account of Bengal (which historically included modern Bangladesh, West Bengal, Bihar and Orissa), he joined the Bengal Gazetteer Office as a clerk (1870). He became a chief clerk in the Agriculture Department and rose to become its assistant director, before joining the Government of India revenue department (1881). He helped in organizing the exhibits for the Calcutta International Exhibition of 1883. From 1886 he was assistant curator of the Indian Museum in Calcutta. In 1896 he retired on a pension.

During India's Great Famine of 1876–78, which had been aggravated by Viceroy Lytton's policy of exporting Indian wheat and other cash crops, Troilokyanath advised the government that it could save many lives by promoting the cultivation of carrots; the policy was adopted in the Raebareli and Sultanpur districts of Uttar Pradesh. F. N. Wright notes: "How wonderfully life was preserved in our upper districts by the extension of carrot cultivation, and how important it is to introduce crops (1) which do not fail under the same conditions as the staple crops of the country, and (2) which give a substantial fodder supply in the cold and dry months. Our chief expectations this direction rest upon (1) lucerne in irrigated tracts, mangelwurzel" — a type of beet grown mainly for animal feed — and "(3) extension of the cultivation of carrots, potatoes and other root crops to districts where they are little known."

Mukharji was elected to Fellow of the Linnean Society on 16 December 1886. He was nominated by B. D. Jackson and supported by F. A. Walker, F. J. Hanbury, and J. S. Britten.

== Literary career ==
Trailokyanath Mukhopadhyay was a famous writer, one of the pioneers of secular Bengali literature. One of his most famous works is Damaru Charit (Bengali: ডমরু-চরিত), a collection of humorous and satirical short stories published posthumously in 1923. The stories, set in colonial India, recount the life and times of the antihero Damarudhar, portrayed as a dishonest man who rises from a lowly shop-assistant to a landowner.

Together with Nagendranath Basu, Trailokyanath compiled the first volume of Bangla Bishwakosh (Bengali: বাঙলা বিশ্বকোষ), a Bengali-language encyclopedia; Nagendranath completed the remaining 22 volumes.

Some of Trailokyanath Mukhopadhyay’s short stories are translations/adaptations of English fictions. These include “Pithe Parbane Chine Bhut “ (Bengali: পিঠে পার্বণে চীনে ভূত) (adaptation of Sir Arthur Conan Doyle’s The Brown Hand), “Bhuter Bari” (Bengali: ভূতের বাড়ি) (adaptation of Sir Edward Bulwer-Lytton’s “The Haunted and the Haunters: or the House and the Brain”) and “Pujar Bhut” (Bengali: পূজার ভূত) (adaptation of Mrs Elizabeth Gaskell’s “The Old Nurse’s Story).

An English translation of several of his stories is published as Of Ghosts and Other Perils (Arnab Bhattacharya, trans., 2013: Orient Blackswan, 288 pages. ISBN 978-8125052340). That book includes Birbala, Lullu, Nayanchand’s Business, The Pearl Necklace, Smile on Madan Ghosh’s Face, A Story by Damrudhar and Another Story by Damrudhar.

== Selected works ==
- Art-manufactures of India (1888)
- A Visit To Europe (1902)
- Hand-book of Indian Products (Art-manufactures and Raw Materials) (1883)
- কঙ্কাবতী (Kaṅkābatī, Kankabati, 1892)
- ভুত ও মানুষ (Bhūta Ō Mānuṣa, Ghosts and Humans, 1896)
- ফোকলা দিগম্বর (Phōkalā Digambara, Gap-teeth Digambar, 1900)
- মুক্তা-মালা (Muktā-mālā, The Pearl Necklace, 1901)
- A Visit to Europe (1902)
- ভারতবর্ষীয় বিজ্ঞান সভা (Bhāratabarṣīẏa Bijñāna Sabhā, The Indian Association for the Cultivation Of Science, 1903)
- ময়না কোথায় (Maẏanā Kōthaẏa, Where is The Mynah, 1904)
- মজার গল্প (Majāra Galpa, Amusing Stories, 1905)
- পাপের পরিনাম (Pāpera Pariṇāma, The Consequence of Sin, 1908)
- বীরবালা (Bīrabālā, Birbala)
- লুল্লু (Lullu, Lullu)
- নয়নচাঁদের ব্যবসা (Naẏanacām̐dēra Byabasā, Nayanchand’s Business)
- রাজভক্তিসার (Rājabhaktisāra, The Quintessence of Devotion towards the Crown, 1918–19)
- ডমরু-চরিত (Ḍamaru-carita, The Life-story of Damaru, 1923)
