= Dilip Ghosh =

Dilip Ghosh may refer to:

- Dilip Ghosh (politician) (born 1964)
- Dilip Ghosh (economist) (fl. 2000s)
- Dilip Ghosh (film director) (born 1955)
