= Guhathakurta =

Guhathakurta (Bengali: গুহঠাকুরতা) is a native Bengali Hindu surname, a combination of Guha and Thakurta. The surname is found among the Bengali Kayastha community of India and Bangladesh.

== Notable people with the surname ==
- Guhathakurta family of Barisal, a British Raj era Zamindar family from Bengal Presidency
- Jyotirmoy Guhathakurta (1920–1971), Bengali educator and humanist
- Kamalika Guha Thakurta (fl. from 1998), Indian actress
- Madhulika Guhathakurta, American astrophysicist and scientist
- Paranjoy Guha Thakurta (born 1955), Indian journalist
- Ruma Guha Thakurta (1934–2019), Indian singer and actress
- Runu Guha Thakurta (fl. 1951–53), Indian footballer
- Shreya Guhathakurta (born 1975), Indian Rabindra Sangeet singer
- Surup Guha Thakurta (born 1936), Indian cricketer
- Swami Paramananda (Suresh Chandra Guhathakurta, born 1884), teacher and philosopher
- Tapati Guha-Thakurta (born 1957), Indian historian
