= Ghosal =

Bengali surname

Origin
- Origin: Bengali Hindu
- Region of origin: Bengal

Ghosal or Ghoshal (Bengali: ঘোষাল) is a Bengali Hindu surname. The surname is primarily used by Bengali Brahmins of Rarhi clan.

== Ghosal ==
- Nandini Ghosal, Indian dancer
- Saurav Ghosal (born 1986), Indian squash player
- Soukarya Ghosal (born 1986), Indian film director, lyricist, animator and screenwriter

== Ghoshal ==
- Anup Ghoshal (born 1945), Indian Rabindra Sangeet singer
- Chaiti Ghoshal (fl. 1993–2012), Bengali film and television actress
- Jiban Ghoshal (26 June 1912 — 1 September 1930), Indian independence activist
- Kalipada Ghoshal (1906–1995), artist from Calcutta
- Malati Ghoshal (1902–1984), Indian Rabindra Sangeet singer
- Panchanan Ghoshal (1907–1990), Bengali writer, criminologist and social worker
- Ranjon Ghoshal (1955–2020), founder of the Bangla band Moheener Ghoraguli
- Ratna Ghoshal, Bengali film and television actress in India
- Shreya Ghoshal (born 1984), Indian singer
- Sumantra Ghoshal (1948–2004), academic in the field of management
