= Ajoy =

Ajoy is a given name. Notable people with the name including :

- Ajoy Biswas, Indian politician
- Ajoy Bose (born 1952), Bengali-Indian author and political journalist
- Ajoy Chakrabarty (born 1953), Indian classical singer
- Ajoy Das (cricketer) (born 1976), Indian cricketer
- Ajoy Das (Music Director) (1941–2013), Indian music director and composer
- Ajoy Dasgupta (born 1950), Bangladeshi journalist, writer, lecturer, and freedom fighter
- Ajoy Dey (1952–2021), Indian politician
- Ajoy Ghatak, Indian physicist and author
- Ajoy Ghose, Director of the Indian School of Mines University in Dhanbad, India
- Ajoy Ghosh (1909–1962), prominent leader of the Communist Party of India
- Ajoy Home (1913–1992), Bengali aviculturist, ornithologist, and naturalist
- Ajoy Kar (1914–1985), Indian film director and cinematographer
- Ajoy Kumar (born 1964), Indian Police Service officer
- Ajoy Kumar Dutta, Indian social worker
- Ajoy Mehta, Indian politician
- Ajoy Mukherjee (1901–1986), the fourth chief minister of West Bengal, India
- Ajoy Mukhopadhyay (1928–2019), Indian politician
- Ajoy Nath Ray (born 1946), Indian judge
- Ajoy Roy (1935–2019), retired Professor of Physics at the Dhaka University of Bangladesh
- Ajoy Sarkar (born 1997), Indian cricketer

== See also ==
- All India Kisan Sabha (Ajoy Bhavan), the peasant or farmers' wing of the Communist Party of India
