= Maulika Kayastha =

Maulika
- Maulika
- Religions: Hinduism
- Languages: Bengali
- Populated states: West Bengal, Assam (Barak valley), Tripura
- Subdivisions: Molika
- Related groups: Kulin Kayastha
- Status: Forward caste

Maulika Kayastha is a sub-caste of Bengali Kayasthas originated from the Bengal region of Indian subcontinent. The Bengali Kayasthas are subdivided into different classes or ranks and also divided in terms of their geographical locations. According to legend, the Bengali Hindu King Ballal Sen started the ranking system of Brahmins, Kayasthas and Baidyas in Bengal. The highest ranked Brahmins and Kayasthas are known as Kulin Brahmins and Kulin Kayasthas, respectively, and those Kayasthas not considered to be Kulins are designated Maulikas, Mauliks, Mouliks or Moulikas.
