= Indraneel Mittra =

Indian cancer surgeon

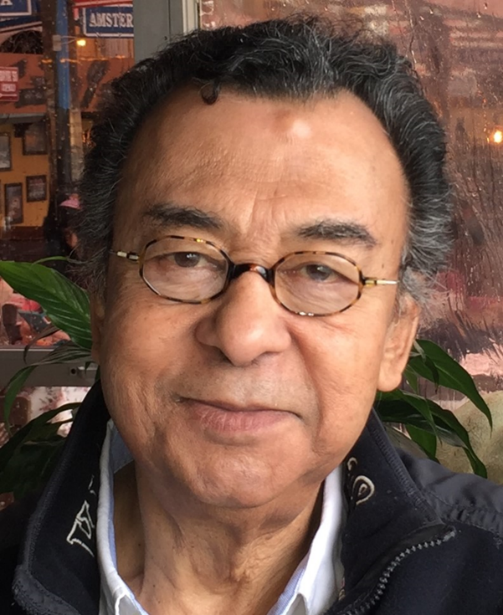
- Born: 28 June 1943 (age 83); New Delhi, India
- Education: Delhi University; Royal College of Surgeons of England; London University
- Scientific career
- Fields: Cancer surgery Laboratory science Public health research
- Academic advisors: Israel Doniach; Renato Dulbecco

Indraneel Mittra (born 28 June 1943) is an Indian cancer surgeon, basic research scientist, and public health researcher. He is the Dr. Ernest Borges Chair in Translational Research and Professor Emeritus in the Department of Surgical Oncology, Tata Memorial Centre (TMC) in Mumbai.

== Biography ==
Mittra was born in New Delhi in 1943 to a family of doctors, with both his father and grandfather being physicians. Mittra studied medicine at the Maulana Azad Medical College, University of Delhi and graduated in 1965. He received his surgical training in the UK at the Hammersmith Hospital and Royal Postgraduate Medical School, Royal Sussex County Hospital, and Guy's Hospital in London. He subsequently became a Fellowship of the Royal Colleges of Surgeons of England in 1971, and received his PhD in Medicine (cancer biology) from the University of London in 1977 under the guidance of Israel Doniach. He then completed his post-doctoral training under Renato Dulbecco at the Imperial Cancer Research Fund Laboratories in London. He followed this up with a stint at St Bartholomew's Hospital and the Institute of Cancer Research in London as a Post-doctoral Fellow.

== Career and Research ==
=== Surgical and Clinical Research ===
On returning to India in 1982, Mittra joined the Tata Memorial Centre as a consultant surgical oncologist and quickly rose to become Professor of Surgery and Chief of the Surgical Breast Cancer Service. Realising the urgent need for science-based treatment of cancer, he pioneered the discipline of clinical research in India by introducing clinical research methodologies and the discipline of randomised clinical trials. He set up India's first multi-disciplinary breast cancer unit, a model which has since been adopted by most centres in the country. The unit he set up was the first to make breast conservation surgery the standard treatment for early breast cancer.

=== Public Health Research ===
In 1996, Mittra was the first Indian recipient of a RO1 grant from the United States National Institutes of Health (NIH). This award enabled him to conduct one of the largest community-based randomized trials on the use of low-cost technology for the early detection of breast and cervical cancer. This landmark screening study, involving 150,000 participants and lasting 20 years, showed that simple techniques conducted by trained health workers, viz., clinical breast examination (CBE) and visual inspection of the cervix after application of 4% acetic acid (VIA), can significantly reduce mortality from breast and cervical cancer, respectively. The results of this study, published in the British Medical Journal, showed that CBE was particularly effective in women above the age of 50, reducing death rate from breast cancer by 30%. VIA reduced cervical cancer mortality by 30% in women of all ages. These techniques are now cornerstones of the national cancer screeningprogram in India. Implemented globally, they have the potential to save the lives of thousands of women in low- and middle-income countries and improve the well-being of countless others.

=== Translational Research ===
Mittra's first publication, a single-author paper in Nature when he was just 31, opened up research into the role of thyroid hormone in breast cancer. Following his return to India, he worked extensively on prognostic factors in breast cancer and their relationship with treatment outcomes.

For the past 25 years, Mittra's research has focused on cell-free chromatin particles (cfChPs), fragments of DNA that are released by dying cells, and their myriad biological activities. Mittra has demonstrated that when cfChPs enter healthy cells, they can damage the cells’ DNA, triggering biological changes associated with aging and age-related diseases, sepsis, the spread of cancer, and the toxic side-effects of chemotherapy and radiotherapy. He has also identified a potential treatment. He has shown that when two simple nutraceuticals, copper and resveratrol, are mixed together, they generate oxygen radicals that can deactivate or neutralize cfChPs. In small studies of patients with glioblastoma and squamous cell carcinoma, these nutraceuticals had a profound effect on tumour biology and may have halted disease growth and spread.

=== Fundamental Research ===
His recent significant work involving cfChPs challenges the long-standing view of the mammalian genome as a stable, vertically inherited entity. It shows that cfChPs released from dying cells can enter living cells, assemble into concatemers, and function as autonomous "satellite genomes" capable of replication, transcription, and protein synthesis. These findings provide experimental evidence for horizontal gene transfer in mammals and reveal cfChPs as active biological agents rather than inert debris. The proposed binarygenome model suggests that inherited and acquired genomic elements coexist within cells, redefining genome plasticity, the role of non-coding DNA, and mechanisms underlying genomic innovation, cellular communication, and evolutionary change. Simply put, this work rewrites the rules of mammalian evolution and genomics.

== Awards and recognition ==
Mittra was elected to the fellowship of the Indian Academy of Sciences and Indian National Science Academy in recognition of his contribution to the field of cancer. He held the Pearce Goulde professorship at University College London (1999).

Mittra has been on the editorial/advisory boards of The British Medical Journal, The Lancet Oncology, Nature Clinical Practice Oncology (currently Nature Reviews Clinical Oncology), the British Journal of Cancer, European Journal of Cancer, among others. He holds a US patent (no. US 9,096,655 B2) titled "Method for in-vivo binding of chromatin fragments".
