= Mriganka Sur =

Indian neuroscientist

- Born: 1953 (age 72–73); Fatehgarh, India
- Occupation: Neuroscientist

Academic background
- Education: IIT Kanpur (B.Tech.); Vanderbilt University (MS), (Ph.D.)

Academic work
- Institutions: Massachusetts Institute of Technology; Yale University
- Website: www.surlab.org

Mriganka Sur (born 1953 in Fatehgarh, India) is an Indian-American neuroscientist known for his contributions to understanding the development, organization, plasticity and computational function of the cerebral cortex. He is the Newton Professor of Neuroscience and director of the Simons Center for the Social Brain at the Massachusetts Institute of Technology. He also served as a visiting faculty member in the Department of Computer Science and Engineering at the Indian Institute of Technology Madras and N.R. Narayana Murthy Distinguished Chair in Computational Brain Research at the Centre for Computational Brain Research, IIT Madras. He was on the Life Sciences jury for the Infosys Prize in 2010, and has served as jury chair since 2018.

== Early life and education ==
Sur did his early schooling at the St. Joseph's Collegiate School, Allahabad. He received a Bachelor of Technology degree in electrical engineering from the Indian Institute of Technology in Kanpur (IIT Kanpur) in 1974, and Master of Science and PhD degrees in electrical engineering in 1975 and 1978, respectively, from Vanderbilt University in Nashville. After postdoctoral research at Stony Brook University, he was appointed to the faculty of Yale University School of Medicine in 1983.

== Career ==
Sur joined the faculty of the Department of Brain and Cognitive Sciences at the Massachusetts Institute of Technology (MIT) in 1986. In 1993, he was named professor of Neuroscience, and in 1997, head of the Department of Brain and Cognitive Sciences. He is currently the Newton Professor of Neuroscience and director of the Simons Center for the Social Brain at MIT.

Sur is a pioneer in technology development for analyzing the function and structure of neurons and synapses in the live brain, and the study of brain plasticity and its mechanisms. His research involves experimental and computational approaches to study developmental plasticity in the developing brain, and dynamic changes in mature cortical networks during learning and information processing.

His laboratory investigates fundamental principles governing how networks of the cerebral cortex are wired during development and are dynamically reorganized during learning. His group's discoveries have provided foundational concepts of how cortical circuits process information underlying perception, cognition, and goal-directed action.

== Important Discoveries ==
=== Cortical plasticity ===
==== Rewiring cortex ====
Sur’s work on cortical plasticity has had a seminal impact on the field. His discovery of developmental plasticity induced by novel input activity overturned an innate ‘labeled line’ hypothesis of cortical function.

By routing visual inputs to the auditory thalamus in neonatal ferrets, his lab showed that the auditory cortex, which normally processes hearing, can ‘rewire’ its circuits to generate visual maps, process vision, and mediate visual behavior. These discoveries provide a powerful demonstration that cortex is a reconfigurable substrate that can be patterned by inputs.

==== Mechanisms of plasticity ====
To understand mechanisms of activity-dependent plasticity, Sur’s lab used microarray analyses of classic visual plasticity paradigms (dark-rearing and monocular deprivation during the critical period) to discover gene expression changes and microRNAs associated with cortical plasticity.

They demonstrated rules of plasticity and the role of specific molecules in implementing these rules. His lab showed that neuronal plasticity is implemented by locally coordinated potentiation and depression of spines, which involves AMPA receptor redistribution via targeted expression of Arc.

Together with large-scale synaptic dynamics of V1 neurons during normal development, these findings have demonstrated a fundamental principle, that Hebbian strengthening of coactive synapses and heterosynaptic weakening of adjacent synapses cooperatively mediate neuron-wide plasticity.

=== Mechanisms and therapeutics for neurodevelopmental disorders ===
Sur’s group has applied this understanding of plasticity to study disorders of brain development. Rett Syndrome is a devastating neurodevelopmental disorder caused by mutations in MECP2, a transcriptional regulator. Sur hypothesized that a core mechanism of Rett Syndrome is the persistence of immature synapses which may be induced to mature. Rett model mice indeed have a deficit in PI3K/Akt/Erk signaling and PSD95 expression, leading to immature excitatory synapses and prolonged visual cortex plasticity that extends into adulthood. Application of IGF1(1-3) peptide, which degrades IGF binding proteins produced by astrocytes and enhances IGF1 availability, and of full-length IGF1, upregulates these signals to restore normal synaptic plasticity and function and improve behavioral phenotypes.

Human Rett IPSC-derived neurons show deficits in IGF1 and similar effectiveness of IGF1 in restoring PI3K, AKT and S6 signals. Based on the lab’s work, an IGF1(1-3) mimetic – trofinetide - was employed in clinical trials for Rett Syndrome. In 2023, trofinetide was approved by the FDA as the first treatment for Rett Syndrome. This work has played an important part in raising optimism that even major disorders of brain development may be treated effectively when understood mechanistically.

=== Cortical circuits and roles of neuromodulators ===
==== E-I balance as crucial for visual cortex function ====
By computational modeling, Sur’s group proposed that a key feature of visual cortex networks - local and long-range connections between excitatory neurons critically balanced by inhibition - is essential for explaining feature-selective responses. They demonstrated that inhibition and excitation are exquisitely tuned across cortical sites, as demonstrated by imaging and intracellular recordings.

==== Role of inhibitory neuron classes ====
The Sur lab pioneered two-photon measurements of neuronal activity in the intact mouse brain with cell-specific manipulations of activity to discover specific and unique functions of inhibitory neuron classes in cortical responses. Probing neuromodulator-dependent mechanisms of internal states, they demonstrated that cholinergic inputs to inhibitory neuron classes shape the temporal dynamics of cortical activity, including neuronal desynchronization during arousal and attention.

Role of norepinephrine in cortical circuits and learning

The Sur lab showed that control of norepinephrine release by locus coeruleus neurons via local GABAergic neurons strongly influences arousal, and phasic norepinephrine activity signals uncertainty and reward prediction to modulate task execution and reinforcement learning during goal-directed behavior. Together, these discoveries have shaped the understanding that specific excitatory and inhibitory cortical circuits mediate unique functions, and neuromodulator systems act via cell-specific circuits to modulate cortical functions, brain states and learning.

=== Astrocytes and astrocyte-neuron circuits ===
==== Astrocytes and blood oxygen levels ====
The Sur lab has discovered novel and critical roles for astrocytes in brain function. By high resolution imaging in the intact visual cortex, they showed that astrocytes have tuned calcium responses to visual stimuli that are mediated importantly via glutamate transporters on astrocyte processes that surround synapses, and they influence local blood flow and hence the hemodynamic signals that underlie brain imaging methods such as fMRI.

Role of astrocytes in information processing and plasticity

Astrocytes are also activated by neuromodulators such as acetylcholine and norepinephrine, and Sur and coworkers showed that cholinergic inputs to cortex act via astrocytes to alter the strength of excitatory synapses and implement plasticity of neuronal responses. Furthermore, astrocyte GABA transporters regulate extrasynaptic GABA and influence population coding of visual information by V1 neurons. Astrocyte calcium signaling influences excitatory drive to inhibitory neurons, thereby enabling astrocytes to modulate excitatory-inhibitory balance in neuronal V1 circuits.

Astrocytes and learning

Glutamate transporters on astrocytes regulate developmental plasticity in visual cortex. Gene expression (of glutamate and GABA transporters) in cortical astrocytes is modulated by learning, and astrocytes thus crucially shape cortical neuronal activity underlying learned behavior. Recently, The Sur lab has shown that cortical astrocytes transform phasic norepinephrine reward prediction signals into prolonged calcium responses critical for behavioral optimization, and hence play an instrumental role in reinforcement learning (Drummond et al., bioRxiv 2026). These studies have thus contributed fundamentally to the view that astrocytes are not only partners with neurons but even have unique roles in information processing, plasticity and learning.

=== Novel technologies and mechanisms of cognitive function ===
Technologies for imaging brain activity

The Sur laboratory developed high resolution two-photon microscopy in the intact mouse brain to show that synapses on visual cortex pyramidal neurons are highly dynamic structures whose form and function can change under the influence of electrical activity. They have continued to develop advanced multi-photon technologies for imaging the calcium activity of cells and their processes across multiple cortical areas and depths.

Mechanisms of learning and cognition

Combined with cell- and projection-specific manipulations, high-density recordings and computational analyses, these technologies have demonstrated principles of information representation, decisions and action selection in higher (parietal and prefrontal) cortex in mice performing perceptual discrimination and memory-guided decision tasks. The lab has elucidated distinct roles of prefrontal cortex subregions that provide feedback to V1 across behavioral states, demonstrating exquisite specificity of top-down projections in cortical networks. The lab is opening up new ways to address longstanding questions about the neural architecture of cognition. For example, they have shown that pulvinar inputs to prefrontal cortex encode sensory history as a low-dimensional activity manifold that forms a substrate for attention, and modular subsets of prefrontal cortex neurons representing specific functions are computationally recombined across tasks to generate flexible behavior.

== Awards and honors ==
Sur has received numerous honors, including election as a fellow of the Royal Society, the American Academy of Arts and Sciences, the National Academy of Medicine, the American Association for the Advancement of Science, and the American Institute for Medical and Biological Engineering.
