= Ivan Roitt =

British scientist

Ivan Maurice Roitt (born 30 September 1927) is a British scientist. He was educated at King Edward's School, Birmingham and Balliol College, Oxford University. He was Head of the Department of Immunology at University College London from 1967 to 1992, and is currently Honorary Director of the Centre for Investigative & Diagnostic Oncology at Middlesex University, London.

In 1956, together with Deborah Doniach and Peter Campbell, he made the classic discovery of thyroglobulin autoantibodies in Hashimoto's thyroiditis which helped to open the whole concept of a relationship between autoimmunity and human disease. The work was extended to an intensive study of autoimmune phenomena in pernicious anemia and primary biliary cirrhosis.

In 1983 he was elected a Fellow of the Royal Society, and has been elected to Honorary Membership of the Royal College of Physicians and appointed Honorary Fellow of The Royal Society of Medicine. He was awarded the Gairdner Foundation International Award in 1964. He is an honorary member of the British Society for Immunology.
