= Center for Computational Brain Research =

Indian research centre

Coordinates: 12.99151°N 80.23362°E

Center for Computational Brain Research, IIT Madras
- Abbreviation: CCBR
- Formation: 2015
- Type: Public
- Headquarters: Chennai, India
- Location: IIT Madras, Chennai, Tamil Nadu 600036
- Founder: Kris Gopalakrishnan
- Parent organization: IIT Madras, India
- Website: Official webpage

The Center for Computational Brain Research (CCBR) is an Interdisciplinarity research centre located at the Indian Institute of Technology Madras, Chennai, India. CCBR was set up in 2015 with funding from the co-founder of Infosys, Kris Gopalakrishnan. The stated objective of the center is "to explore the interface between Neuroscience and Engineering disciplines".

== Research activities ==
The two broad areas of research at the center are:

to exploit engineering tools for analysing the structure and activity of neural circuits
advancing machine intelligence with brain-inspired hardware and software architecture.

The center has three chairs with an endowment of ₹100 million each. These chairs are currently held by distinguished Indian American professors Partha Mitra (Cold Spring Harbor Laboratory), Mriganka Sur (MIT) and Anand Raghunathan (Purdue University).

== Academic activities ==
Some of the teaching modules at CCBR are neuroscience, machine learning, vision, audition, natural language processing and reinforcement learning. The center has also organized an annual winter course/workshop on "Machine Intelligence and Brain Research" during the first week of January.
