= Bose (given name) =

Bose is a given name. Notable people with the name include:

- Bose Alao (born 1985), Nigerian actress and producer
- Bose Ikard (1843–1929), American cowboy
- Bose Kaffo (born 1972), Nigerian table tennis player
- Bose Krishnamachari, Indian painter
- Bose Ogulu Nigerian businessperson
- Bose Omolayo (born 1989), Nigerian weightlifter
- Bose Samuel (born 1998), Nigerian wrestler
- Bose Venkat (born 1976), Indian actor

== See also ==
- Bose (surname)
