= Opashona Ghosh =

Indian illustrator and graphic designer

- Born: 1987
- Died: Calcutta
- Occupations: Indian illustrator and graphic designer

Opashona Ghosh (born 1987, Calcutta) is an Indian illustrator and graphic designer based in the city of Kolkata, West Bengal. Her works are known for a feminist approach to clubbing culture, mental and sexual health, and have been described to be 90s-inspired, pop-art-style works, featuring illustrations on gender and queer identity, drawing on into themes of femininity, gender appropriation and eroticism. According to the Verve magazine, her works are aimed towards questioning ideas on cultural acceptance, femininity, and queer identity.

Born in the city of Kolkata, Ghosh graduated from the Central Saint Martins in London with a degree in communication design. Following graduation, she worked backstages in the theatres of London and later at the Berghain nightclub in the city of Berlin. She describes herself as an accidental artist, having received success internationally and her works displayed in various art galleries of London and Berlin. She has also worked in collaboration with feminist magazines, fashion labels, queer collectives and electronic musicians from London, Berlin and New York.
