= Bapi Bose =

Indian cricketer (1909–1977)

Bapi Bose (16 October 1909 – 3 August 1977), born Sailendra Mohan Bose, was an Indian cricketer. He was a right-handed batsman who played for Bengal. He was born in Calcutta and died in Bombay.

Bose made two first-class appearances for the Indian University Occasionals, scoring a duck in the first innings in which he batted, against Ceylon, while the Occasionals finished marginally short of a hefty victory, as the match finished in a draw.

Bose made two Ranji Trophy appearances during the 1935–36 season, for Bengal, making his top score of 26 in his final first-class game.

Bose's brothers, Ganesh and Kartick, also played first-class cricket.
