= Sudip Chatterjee =

Sudip Chatterjee may refer to:

- Sudip Chatterjee (cricketer) (born 1991), Indian cricketer
- Sudip Chatterjee (footballer) (1959–2006), Indian footballer

== See also ==
- Sudeep Chatterjee, Indian cinematographer
