= Saumendra Kumar Ghose =

Indian politician

Saumendra Kumar Ghose (born 1964) is the current Mayor of the city of Cuttack, the capital of the Indian state of Odisha.
