= The Brown Hand =

1899 short story by Arthur Conan Doyle

- Short story by Arthur Conan Doyle
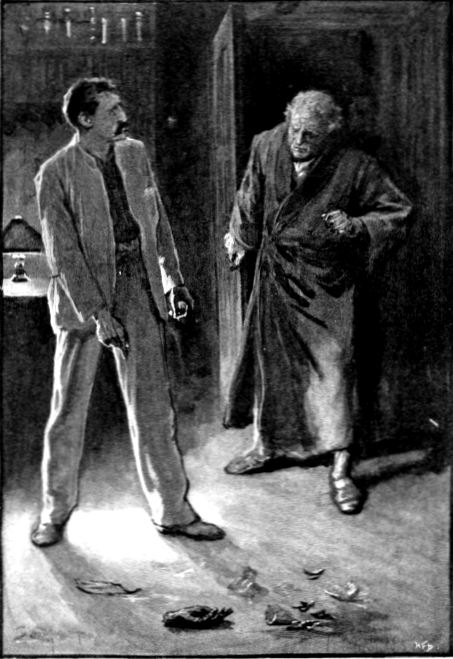
- "My door flew open and Sir Dominick rushed in."

Text available at Wikisource
- Original title: The Story of the Brown Hand
- Country: United Kingdom
- Language: English

Publication
- Published in: The Strand Magazine
- Publication date: May 1899

"The Brown Hand," a well-noted short story by Sir Arthur Conan Doyle, was first published in volume 17, issue 101 of The Strand Magazine in May 1899 as The Story of the Brown Hand.

== Background ==
The story is based on an Indian urban legend that tells of a Muslim who was forced to have his arm amputated after an accident, and died a few months later, but after death became a ghost and began wandering about in search of his limb.

== Plot summary ==
The central character of the story is a doctor, Sir Dominick Holden, who has had a long spell of service in British India, first as a military doctor and then as a private surgeon in Bombay. Once when he was posted at Peshawar, then a main city of undivided Punjab (hence a part of India), he had to attend a poor Afghan whose one hand was in such a bad state due to the growth of a gangrene, that the only way to save his life was to amputate it. The operation was performed and Dr. Holden asked for the amputated hand as his fees. Dr. Holden had a hobby of collecting discarded limbs, organs, and cysts from living and dead humans and thus wanted to add the "brown hand" to his collection. The Afghan, being Islamic, refused to part with his amputated hand, as it breached the rule of his religion which stated amputated body parts must be kept with the owner himself. But Dr. Holden promised to return the Afghan his hand before his death and took the hand with him to his house in Bombay.

Dr. Holden retired soon after and settled in Wiltshire. One night he was awakened by someone pulling his clothes - the ghost of his old Afghan patient. Dr. Holden understood that the Afghan had died and his ghost wanted back the amputated hand. From then onwards, the ghost haunted the doctor's laboratory every night for four years looking for his hand. But the ghost failed to find the hand since it had been damaged in a fire that broke out at the doctor's house in Bombay. The recurring visit of the ghost, however, had made the life of Dr. Holden and his wife, Lady Holden, miserable and the effect on their health was prominent. A doctor known for his steel nerves had now become a scared individual.

The protagonist of the story, Dr. Holden's nephew Hardacre, decided to solve this problem. He spent his first night in the laboratory and saw the Afghan searching for his hand. The next day, Dr. Holden explained him everything in details and Hardacre left for London. Hardacre, a doctor himself, went through a book on spirits and found that certain spirits could not leave the living world because of them being strongly attached to something or someone existing in this world. Hardacre decided to try his luck and left for Chadwell where a friend of his was the home surgeon at a hospital for sailors. The home surgeon provided Hardacre with an amputated hand of an Indian sailor as the requirement was a "brown hand".

Hardacre returned to Wiltshire and placed the hand in a jar and placed it in his uncle's laboratory. Hardacre stayed awake as the Afghan ghost came visiting as usual. But Hardacre's experiment failed as the Afghan on seeing the hand, wailed in agony and smashed the jar on the floor before disappearing. Next morning, Hardacre realised his mistake as he had brought the left hand of the sailor while the Afghan had had his right hand separated. Hardacre rushed back to Chadwell and luckily got the right hand of the sailor. He returned and placed the hand in a jar in the lab just like the previous day. Dr. Holden forbade Hardacre from sleeping in the laboratory as he feared risking his nephew's life.

That night, Hardacre again saw somebody approaching him while he tried to sleep. But it was not any ghost but his uncle who seemed overwhelmed with joy and had suddenly regained some of the energy he possessed earlier. Dr. Holden stated that the ghost had finally found his amputated hand and before leaving, he had bowed thrice in front of him, in a way similar to how Afghans pay respect. The Holdens lived on peacefully and consulted Hardacre for every major decisions they took thereafter. Before he died, Dr. Holden named Hardacre as the heir to his property.
