= Bengali Brahmin =

Hindu caste

Bengali Brahmins
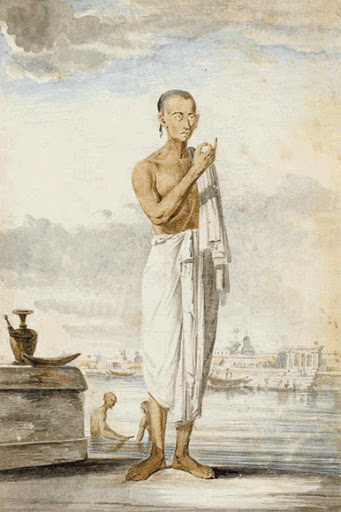
- A Bengali Brahmin priest
- Religions: Hinduism
- Languages: Bengali
- Populated states: West Bengal, Assam, Tripura
- Related groups: Maithil Brahmin, Utkala Brahmin, Kanyakubja Brahmin

Bengali Brahmins are the community of Hindu Brahmins, who traditionally reside in the Bengal region of the Indian subcontinent, comprising the Indian state of West Bengal and the country of Bangladesh.

The Bengali Brahmins, along with Baidyas and Kayasthas, are regarded among the three traditional higher castes of Bengal. In the colonial era the Bhadraloks of Bengal were primarily, not exclusively, drawn from these three castes.

== History ==
For a long period, Bengal was not part of Vedic culture. However, North Bengal was a part of the Aryan acculturation during the Mauryan era, as depicted in the Mahasthan inscription. By the end of the 3rd century C.E., the region came under the rule of the Magadha Empire under Samudragupta and remained within this empire until the mid-6th century C.E. According to contemporary historians, Brahmanism was found to have gained prominence in Bengal as early as the fourth century C.E. The later Gupta kings of Magadha promoted the growth of Brahmanism in the region while also showing support for Jainism and Buddhism. Multiple land-grants to Brahmins have been observed since the Gupta Era. The Dhanaidaha copper-plate inscription, dated to 433 C.E., is the earliest of them and records a grantee Brahmin named Varahasvamin The Vaigram edict (447–48) mentions land grants to Brahmans in the Pundravardhana region. The Damodarpur copper inscriptions, discovered in the Dinajpur area of Bengal's Rajshahi division, describe a century of the Gupta period, from 443–44 C.E. to 533–34 C.E., also revealing the presence of the Brahmanical group in Bengal; Sircar, however, finds this interpretation doubtful. During the Gupta period, many Brahmins arrived in Bengal from various parts of India. Archaeologists found three copper plate grants in the district of Faridpur in East Bengal, with the first two attributed to Dharmaditya and the last to Gopacandra. Among the recipients of these grants were Brahmins, implying the existence of Brahmins at that time. The 7th-century Nidhanpur copperplate inscription mentions that a marshy land tract adjacent to an existing settlement was given to more than 208 Vaidika Brahmins (Brahmins versed in the Vedas) belonging to 56 gotras and different Vedic schools. After the Hun invasion in the fifth century, Bengal had been ruled by several independent rulers. Most of these independent kings between the middle of the sixth and seventh centuries were Hindu Brahmanists. Shashanka, a king of Gauda at the beginning of the seventh century, notably stood out as being opposed to Buddhism. Evidence indicates Brahmanism's continuous growth in Bengal during the reign of these autonomous kings. During Harshavardhan's reign, Huyen-tsang visited Bengal. His records suggest that certain Bengali Brahmins had become monarchs. The ruler of Samatata, whose reign covered the first part of the 7th century C.E., was a Brahmin. Several Brahmins gradually came from central India beginning in the eighth century, and epigraphs of the time provide numerous examples of Brahmin families coming from various parts of India to settle in Bengal. According to Roy, the migrant Brahmins might mingle with the existing Brahmins of Bengal. The epigraphic evidence indicates that although the Palas were a great patron of Buddhism, they supported and endowed Brahmins too. The land grants made by Palas to Brahmins were carried out with orthodox Hindu rituals as described in the inscriptions of Palas. This evidence shows that even in the period of the Pala dynasty, Brahminic practices prevailed. The Varman kings were the rulers of eastern Bengal from 1050 to 1150 C.E., while the Sena kings gained influence in Gauda. Eventually, the Senas became the rulers of all of Bengal. The Sena and Varman kings were followers of Brahmanism and were considered orthodox in their beliefs. Historians believe that these rulers introduced certain aspects of Brahmanism to Bengal, which had a more adaptable society compared to the southern and western parts of India where Brahmanism was more strict.

It is traditionally believed that much later, in the 11th century CE, after the decline of the Pala dynasty, a Hindu king, Adisura brought in five Brahmins from Kanauj, his purpose being to provide education for the Brahmins already in the area whom he thought to be ignorant, and revive traditional orthodox Brahminical Hinduism. As per tradition, these five immigrant Brahmins and their descendants went on to become the Kulin Brahmins. According to Sengupta, multiple accounts of this legend exist, and historians generally consider this to be nothing more than myth or folklore lacking historical authenticity. Identical stories of migration of Orissan Brahmins exist under the legendary king of Yayati Kesari. According to Sayantani Pal, D.C Sircar opines that, the desideration of Bengali Brahmins to gain more prestige by connecting themselves with the Brahmins from the west, 'could have contributed' to the establishment of the system of 'kulinism'.

Referring to the linkages between class and caste in Bengal, Bandyopadhyay mentions that the Brahmins, along with the other two upper castes, refrained from physical labour but controlled land, and as such represented "the three traditional higher castes of Bengal".

== Clans ==
Apart from the common classification as Kulina, Srotriya and Vangaja, Bengali Brahmins are divided into the following clans or divisions:

- Radhi
- Varendra
- Vaidika
- Saptasati
- Madhyasreni
- Sakadwipi

=== Kulin Brahmin ===
Kulin Brahmins trace their ancestry to five families of Kanyakubja Brahmins who migrated to Bengal. In the 11th century CE, after the decline of the Pala dynasty, a Hindu king, Adi Sura, brought in five Brahmins and their five attendants from Kannauj, his purpose being to provide education for the Brahmins already in the area, whom he thought to be ignorant, and to revive traditional orthodox Brahminical Hinduism. These Vedic Brahmins were supposed to have nine gunas (favoured attributes), among which was insistence on same-rank marriages. Multiple accounts of this legend exist; historians generally consider it to be nothing more than myth or folklore, lacking historical authenticity. The tradition continues by saying that these incomers settled and each became the founder of a clan.

These Brahmins were designated as Kulina ("superior") in order to differentiate them from the more established local Brahmins. The surnames commonly used by the Kulin Brahmins are Mukherjee, Banerjee, Chatterjee, Ganguly, and Bhattacharjee. According to Ishwar Chandra Vidyasagar, there were fifty-six Kulin Brahmin surnames, out of which eight were popular, including Ghosal, Putitunda, Kanjilal and Kundagrami.

== Post Partition of India ==
When the British left India in 1947, carving out separate nations, many Brahmins, whose original homes were in the newly created Islamic Republic of Pakistan, migrated en masse to be within the borders of the newly defined Republic of India, and continued to migrate for several decades thereafter to escape Islamist persecution.

== Notable people ==
- Bhavashankari, Queen of Bhurishrestha
- Mamata Banerjee (1955–present), 8th Chief Minister of West Bengal
- Surendranath Banerjee (1848–1925), founder of the Indian National Association, first Indian to pass the Indian civil service examination
- Bankim Chandra Chatterjee (1838–1894), Indian Bengali novelist, poet and journalist
- Raja Ganesha, founder of the Ganesha dynasty of Bengal
- Ashok Kumar (Ganguly) (1911–2001), Indian film actor
- Kishore Kumar (Ganguly) (1929–1987), Indian playback singer, actor, music director, lyricist, writer, director, producer and screenwriter
- Pranab Mukherjee (1935–2020), 13th President of India and a veteran leader of the Indian National Congress
- Raja Krishnachandra Roy, Raja of Nadia Raj
- Raja Ram Mohan Roy (1772-1833), Indian social reformer
- Rudranarayan, Maharaja of Bhurishrestha
- Dwarkanath Tagore (1794–1846), one of the first Indian industrialists to form an enterprise with British partners

== See also ==
- Kulin Kayastha
