= Sebastian Doniach =

British-American physicist

Sebastian Doniach (born 1934, in Paris, France) is a British-American physicist and professor at Stanford University. His research interests include theoretical condensed matter physics, superconductivity, and biophysics.

== Family ==
His mother was the distinguished clinical immunologist Deborah Doniach (1912-2004) and his father was Israel "Sonny" Doniach (1911-2001). Sebastian had one sibling, a sister Vera (1936-1958).

Sebastian and his first wife, Sara Bridget Doniach (26 June 1932 – 18 September 2000) had several children. The couple relocated to Palo Alto, California, where Sarah Doniach died in 2000. He later remarried, to Jennifer Mallon.

== Career ==
Sebastian Doniach received a B.A. from Christ's College, Cambridge in 1954 and a Ph.D. from the University of Liverpool with Herbert Fröhlich in 1958.

His contributions to the field of condensed matter physics include the Lawrence-Doniach model of superconductivity and his book on Green's functions in solid state physics with E. H. Sondheimer . Sebastian Doniach is one of the pioneers of synchrotron X-ray sources and served as the first director of the Stanford Synchrotron. His research group at Stanford currently uses radiation from the Stanford Synchrotron and from the Advanced Photon Source at Argonne National Laboratory for studies of protein and RNA structure and dynamics. He lay the theoretical groundwork for what would later become known as the Kondo necklace model, an important concept in condensed-matter physics

== Publications ==
- Sebastian Doniach: Publications 1995-2005
