= Partha Mitra =

American neuro- and computer scientist

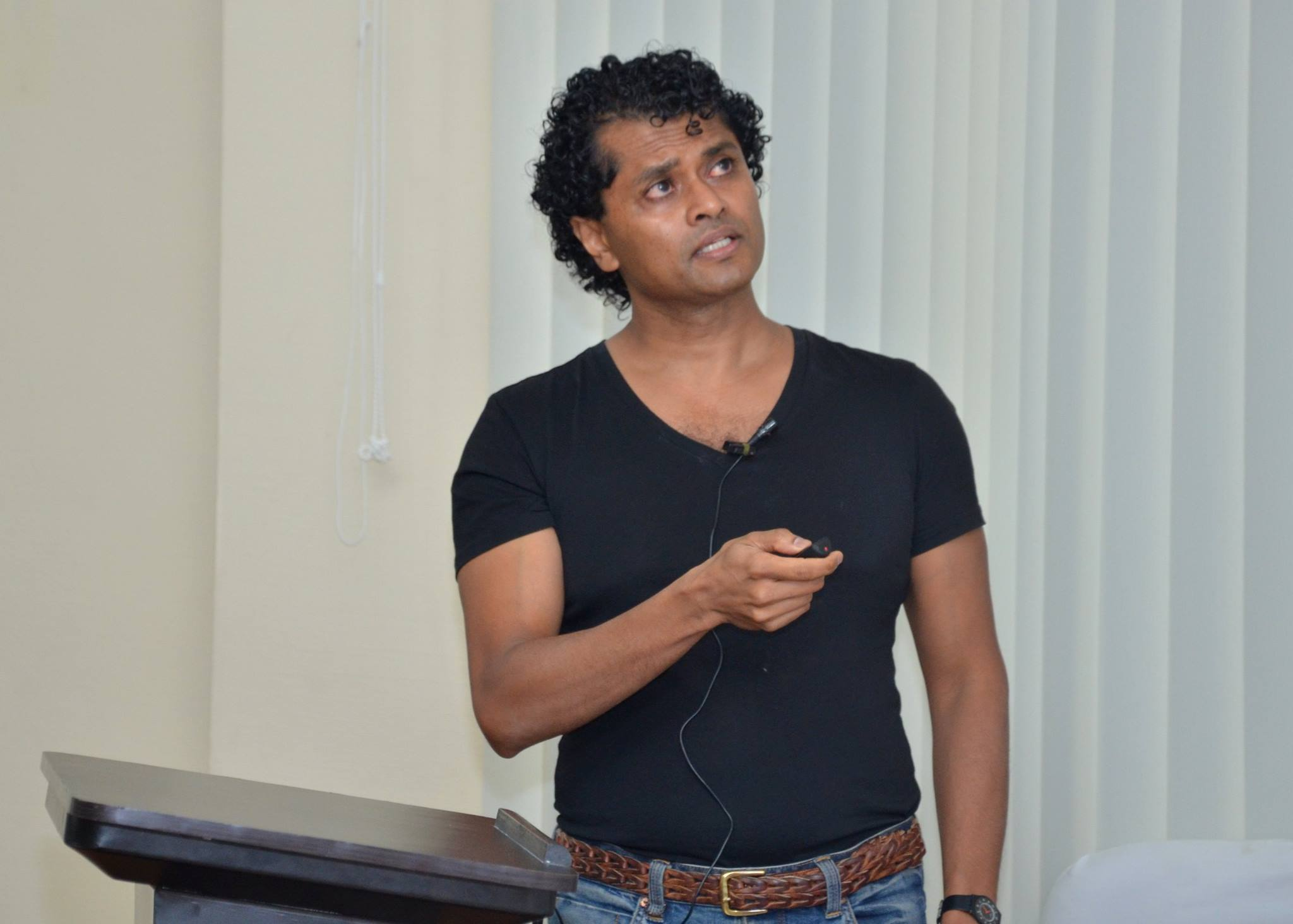
- Education: Harvard University, Presidency University, Kolkata
- Known for: Neural circuit Computational Neuroscience; BRAIN Initiative; Brain Architecture Project
- Awards: Senior Member, IEEE; HN Mahabala Distinguished Chair at IIT Madras; Fellow, American Physical Society; Crick-Clay Professor of Biomathematics at Cold Spring Harbor Laboratory
- Scientific career
- Fields: Neuroscience; Statistical physics Machine learning Artificial intelligence
- Workplaces: Cold Spring Harbor Laboratory; IIT Madras; RIKEN; Bell Labs; Caltech

Partha Pratim Mitra is an American neuroscientist, computer scientist and entrepreneur. He is the Crick-Clay Professor of Biomathematics at Cold Spring Harbor Laboratory. Mitra holds the H.N. Mahabala Distinguished Chair in Computational Brain Research at IIT Madras and he was a Senior Visiting Researcher at RIKEN, Tokyo, Japan. In 2014, he founded Clarapath, with an aim to automate tissue sectioning in the clinical laboratory.

== Biography ==
Partha Mitra received his PhD in theoretical physics from Harvard University under the guidance of Bertrand Halperin in 1993. He was a member of the Theoretical Physics Department at Bell Laboratories from 1993 to 2003, and an assistant professor in Theoretical Physics at Caltech from 1996 before moving to Cold Spring Harbor Laboratory in 2003 where he is a Crick-Clay professor of biomathematics. Professor Mitra also holds adjunct positions in the NYU School of Medicine and Weill Cornell Medical College.

== Research ==
Mitra's research aims to study the complex biological systems from a “theoretical engineering” perspective. He combines theoretical, computational and experimental approaches and currently understanding how brains work. Professor Mitra initiated the idea of brain-wide mesoscale circuit mapping and founded the Brain Architecture Project, including collaborations with RIKEN Brain Science Institute and Monash University. He has published over 240 research articles in peer-reviewed journals such as Nature, Science, PNAS, PRL with an H-index of 70 and holds thirty-one U.S. patents. He has also co-authored a book titled Observed Brain Dynamics published by the Oxford University Press and has written pieces for Scientific American.
