= Jyoti Basu (disambiguation) =

Jyoti Basu (1914–2010) was chief minister of West Bengal, India.

Jyoti Basu may also refer to:

- Joyoti Basu (born 1957), Indian biochemist
- Jyotirmoy Basu (1920–1982), Indian politician from West Bengal
- Jyoti Basu Sarani, a road in Kolkata, India
