= Rina Mitra =

Indian civil servant

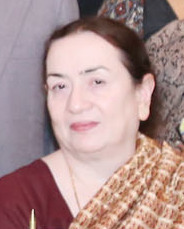

Personal details
- Born: 1 September 1959 (age 67)
- Education: Lady Brabourne College; Calcutta University; National Defence College, Madras University
- Occupation: IPS officer
- Awards: President's Police Medal for Distinguished Service; Police Medal for Meritorious Service; 50th Anniversary Independence Medal
- Police career
- Department: Madhya Pradesh Police, Central Bureau of Investigation, Border Security Force, Railway Board
- Service years: 1983-2019
- Rank: Special Secretary to Government of India

Rina Mitra (IAST: Rīnā Mitra) (born 1 September 1959) is a retired 1983 IPS officer of Madhya Pradesh cadre. She served as Chief Commissioner of the West Bengal Right to Public Service Commission. She served as the Special Secretary (Internal Security) in the Ministry of Home Affairs.

== Education ==
Mitra has a graduate degree in literature from Lady Brabourne College, Kolkata, and a postgraduate degree in literature from Calcutta University. She also has an MPhil degree from the National Defence College, affiliated to Madras University.

== Career ==
Mitra has served in various key positions for both the Union Government and the Government of Madhya Pradesh (Police), like as Special Director General (SDG) (Police Headquarters), Special Director General (Training), Inspector General (IG) (Personnel and Legal), Inspector General (CID) and as the Commandant of 31st and 23rd Battalions of the Madhya Pradesh State Armed Police in the Madhya Pradesh Government (Police), and as Special Secretary (Internal Security) in the Ministry of Home Affairs, Special Director General in Border Security Force (BSF), Director of National Institute of Criminology and Forensic Sciences (NICFS), Director of Bureau of Police Research and Development (BPRD), Director (Vigilance) in the Railway Board, and as a Superintendent of Police (SP) in the Central Bureau of Investigation (CBI) in the Union Government.

She also served as the District Superintendent of Police (SP) of Datia, Balaghat and Chhindwara districts.

=== Special Secretary (Internal Security) ===
Mitra was appointed as the Special Secretary (Internal Security) in the Ministry of Home Affairs by the Appointments Committee of the Cabinet (ACC), she assumed office on 1 March 2017 and served there till January 2019.

== Chief Commissioner of West Bengal Right to Public Services Commission ==
Mitra has been appointed the Chief Commissioner of West Bengal Right to Public Services Commission in May 2022 and served there till 31 August 2024.

== Decorations ==
- Police Medal for meritorious service - Received in 1999
- President's Police Medal for distinguished service - Received in 2008
- 50th Independence Anniversary Medal - Received on 15 August 1997
