= Guha (surname) =

Indian surname

Origin
- Origin: Bengali Hindu
- Region of origin: Bengal

Guha is a surname. It is commonly found among Bengali Hindus, especially Bengali Kayasthas in the Indian states of West Bengal, Tripura and the neighbouring country Bangladesh, and occasionally used by other Indian communities.

Guhas mostly belong to Kayastha caste in Bengal. Bangaja (Eastern Bengal) Guhas (and Guhathakurtas) are considered as Kulin Kayasthas along with Boses, Ghoshes and Mitras. Few other communities like Barujibi and Aguri also use this surname.

== People with the name ==
Notable people with the surname, who may or may not be affiliated to the clan, include:

- Anita Guha (1932–2007), Indian Bengali actress
- Anton-Andreas Guha (1937–2010), German journalist and author
- Ajit Kumar Guha (1914–69), Bangladeshi educationalist
- Biraja Sankar Guha (1894–1951), Indian physical anthropologist
- Buddhadeb Guha (born 1936), Indian Bengali writer
- Chinmoy Guha (born 1958), Indian author and academic
- Chitralekha Guho, Bangladeshi actress and won Bangladesh National Film Award for best supporting role
- Isa Guha (born 1985), English cricketer and commentator
- Jatindra Charan Guho (1892–1972), or Gobar Guha, Indian wrestler
- Phulrenu Guha (born 1911), Indian activist, educationist and politician
- Pratapaditya Guha (1561–1611), King of Jessore
- Ramachandra Guha (born 1958), Indian historian
- Ramanathan V. Guha (born 1965), Indian computer scientist
- Ranajit Guha (1923–2023), Indian historian
- Subrata Guha (1946–2003), Indian cricketer
- Sujoy K. Guha (born 1940), Indian biomedical engineer
- Uttam Guho, winner of Bangladesh National Film Award for best art director
