= Deborah Doniach =

British clinical immunologist (1912–2004)

Deborah Doniach FRCP
- Born: Deborah Abileah; 6 April 1912; Geneva, Switzerland
- Died: 1 January 2004 (aged 91)
- Occupation: Clinical immunologist
- Known for: Pioneering research in autoimmune diseases
- Awards: Van Meter Prize of the American Goitre Association (1957); Gairdner Award, Toronto (1964); Prize of the British Postgraduate Federation (1967); Woman Scientist of the Year Prize, Association of American Women Scientists (1984)

Deborah Doniach (née Abileah; 6 April 1912 – 1 January 2004) was a British clinical immunologist and pioneer in the field of autoimmune diseases.

== Early and personal life ==
Deborah Abileah was born in Geneva, Switzerland, on 6 April 1912 to Russian parents. Her father, Arieh Abileah (born Leon Niswitzki), of Jewish descent, was a concert pianist and music teacher; her mother, Fée Héllès, of Russian-German descent (born Fea Geller), ran a novel dance school in Paris. The family moved frequently during Deborah's childhood, living at various times in Paris, Vienna and Italy.

Due to the frequent moves and her parents' bohemian lifestyle, she did not start any formal education until the age of nine, when she and her sisters were staying at an Italian convent while her mother was recovering from tuberculosis at a sanitorium and her father was accompanying the violinist Josef Szigeti on a tour of the United States. The family later settled in Tel Aviv, Mandatory Palestine, where her father taught piano at the Tel Aviv Conservatory. They left Palestine for Paris, where Deborah was educated at the Lycée Molière. She began studying medicine at the Sorbonne but interrupted her studies in 1933 to relocate to London after marrying Israel "Sonny" Doniach, a British pathologist whom she had first met in Palestine in 1925.

Following the births of her two children, she learned English and resumed her medical studies at the Royal Free Medical School, graduating in 1945.

Deborah and "Sonny" Doniach were together for 75 years (until his death in 2001) and had two children, Sebastian Doniach (born 1934), who went on to become a condensed matter physicist at Stanford University, and Vera Doniach (1936–1958).

== Career ==
Doniach was employed as a research assistant at the Royal Free Hospital then as an endocrinologist at Middlesex Hospital, London where she worked with the eminent thyroid surgeon, Rupert Vaughan-Hudson. Her observation of patients with Hashimoto's disease and knowledge of the field led her to realise that excess antibodies were an autoimmune reaction against the thyroid gland itself rather than external microbes.

She collaborated with Ivan Roitt and Peter Campbell to further understand the autoimmune basis of Hashimoto's disease (citations). Doniach continued her studies at Middlesex Hospital with various collaborators, including Roitt, Sheila Sherlock, Keith Taylor, and Gian Franco Bottazzo, and uncovered an autoimmune basis for numerous diseases, including pernicious anemia, primary biliary cirrhosis, and type I diabetes This led to the concept of organ-specific auto-immunity.

In the 1960s, she joined the then-new Department of Immunology at Middlesex where she was appointed as one of the first Consultant Immunopathologists. In 1974 she became Professor of Clinical Immunology.

== Awards and honours ==
- Van Meter prize of the American Goitre Association (jointly with Ivan Roitt), 1957
- Gairdner Award Toronto (jointly with Ivan Roitt), 1964
- Prize of the British Postgraduate Federation, 1967
- Woman Scientist of the Year prize of the Association of American Women Scientists, 1984

== Selected works ==
- Berg, PA; Doniach, D; Roitt, IM (1967). "Mitochondrial antibodies in primary biliary cirrhosis. I. Localization of the antigen to mitochondrial membranes". The Journal of Experimental Medicine. 126 (2): 277–90. doi:10.1084/jem.126.2.277. PMC 2138313. PMID 4165742.
- Roitt, I. M.; Campbell, P. N.; Doniach, Deborah (June 1958). "The nature of the thyroid auto-antibodies present in patients with Hashimoto's thyroiditis (lymphadenoid goitre)". Biochemical Journal. 69 (2): 248–256. doi:10.1042/bj0690248. PMC 1196545. PMID 13546173.
- Bottazzo, G F; Doniach, D (1986). "Autoimmune Thyroid Disease" (PDF). Annual Review of Medicine. 37: 353–9. doi:10.1146/annurev.me.37.020186.002033. PMID 2871804.
