= Dilip Ghose =

Indian cricketer (born 1932)

Dilip Ghose (born 5 December 1932) was an Indian cricketer. He was a right-handed batsman and a right-arm medium-pace bowler who played for Bengal. He was born in Calcutta.

Ghose made a single first-class appearance for the team, in the 1950/51 Ranji Trophy tournament, against Bihar. Batting in the upper order, he scored 4 runs in the first innings in which he batted, and a single run in the second. He bowled four overs during the match, without claiming a wicket.
