= Malati Ghoshal =

Indian singer (1902–1984)

Malati Ghoshal মালতী ঘোষাল
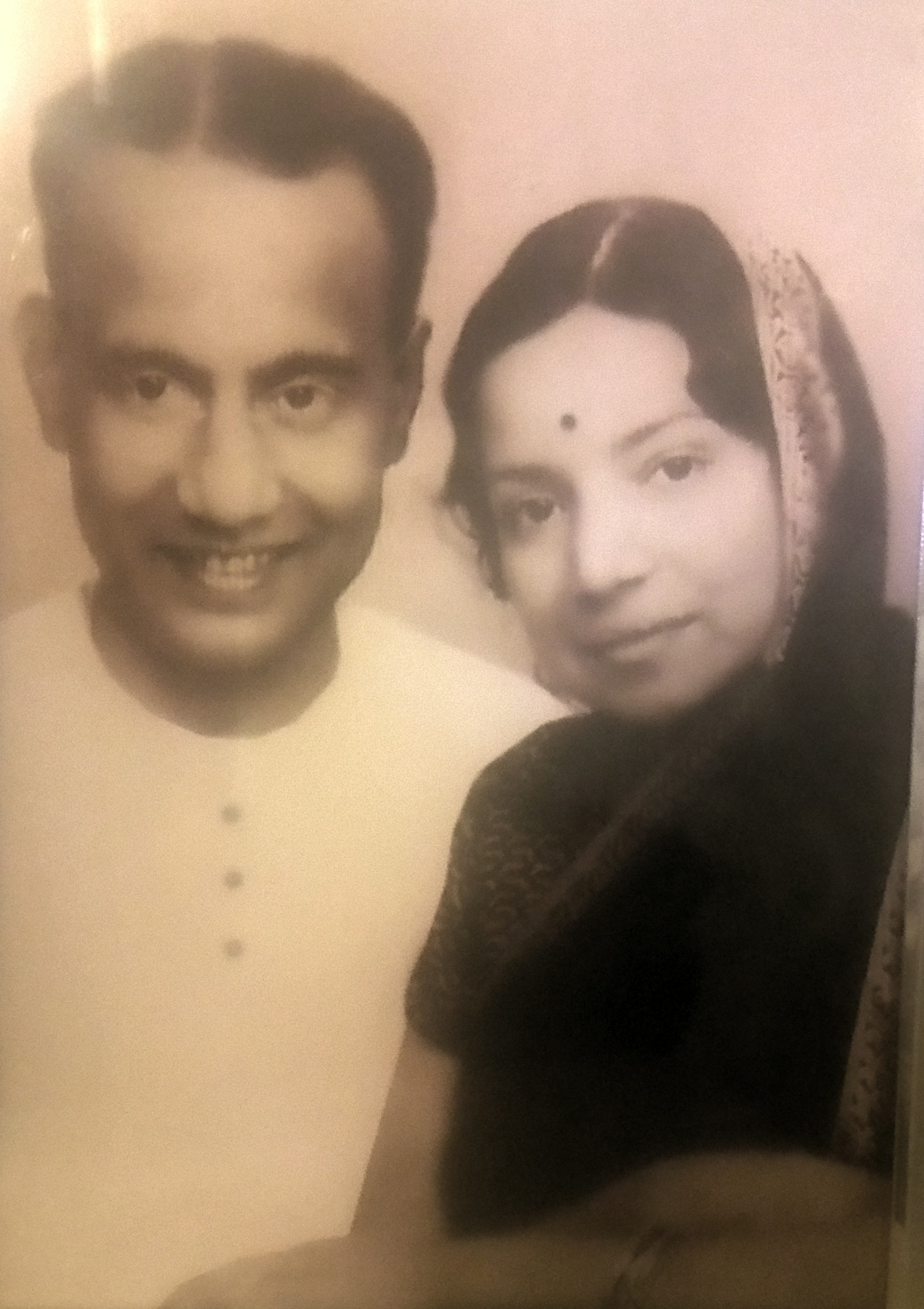
- Malati Ghosal with her husband, Dr. S C Ghosal
- Born: 17 December 1902 Calcutta, Bengal presidency, British India
- Died: 17 July 1984 (aged 81) Kolkata, West Bengal, India
- Occupation: vocalist
- Years active: 1940-52
- Known for: Rabindra Sangeet singer
- Children: Aloka Mitra
- Parents: Hemendra Mohan Bose, swadeshi entrepreneur (father); Mrinalini Bose, sister of Upendrakishore Roychoudhury (mother)

Malati Ghoshal (née Bose) (Bengali: মালতী ঘোষাল) (17 December 1902 – 17 July 1984) was an Indian Rabindra Sangeet singer and one of Rabindranath Tagore's 'Panchakanya' exponents.

== Career ==
Malati Ghoshal was born in Kolkata to Hemendra Mohan Bose, a leading Swadeshi entrepreneur in Bengal, and Mrinalini Bose. Mrinalini was a sister of Saradaranjan Ray, father of cricket in Bengal known to be the W. G. Grace of India and renowned writer Upendrakishore Ray Chowdhury, and therefore a cousin of poet Sukumar Ray, the father of Satyajit Ray. She learnt Tappa from Manada Sundari Dasi, Kirtan from Purnakumari Dasi, Indian Classical Music from Gopeshwar Bandyopadhyay, Surendranath Bandyopadhyay and Shyam Sundar Mitra. She also played Sitar well.

She became a well known exponent of Rabindrasangeet, having sung directly for Rabindranath Tagore along with her contemporaries Amiya and Amita Tagore.

She was married to Dr. Sushanta Chandra Ghoshal in 1935. Dr Ghoshal was a noted microbiologist and Head of the School of Tropical Medicine in Calcutta, and had worked on the deadly diseases kala azar and cholera with the likes of Dr. U N Brahmachari. He was also a proficient singer who supported and encouraged her singing talent.

She comes from an eminent family of Brahmo Samaj and performed at Brahmo ceremonies. She used to sing duets with her husband also.

Her first gramophone record, containing two Tagore Songs, "Ke Bosile Aji" and "Hridayo Basona Purno Holo", was released in 1940. Her second gramophone record, containing two other Tagore Songs, "E Parabase Rabe Ke" and "Jodi E Amaro Hridayo Duaro", was released in 1950. These four songs made her very popular in those days. During the Tagore centenary celebrations of 1961, she released her third disc (both songs duets with Ramesh Bandyopadhyay) with the songs "Anondodhwoni Jagao Gogone" and "Sokolkolushotamosohor".

After her husband died in 1952 she gave up singing. She is survived by a daughter, Aloka Mitra, herself well known in the sphere of social work in Bengal. and grandchildren who are NRIs.
