= Ganesh Bose =

Indian cricketer (1905–1975)

Personal information
- Full name: Hirendra Mohan Bose
- Born: 2 July 1905; Calcutta, British India
- Died: 1 November 1975 (aged 70); Calcutta, India
- Batting: Right-handed
- Role: Batsman

Domestic team information
- Years: Team
- 1935/36–1942/43: Bengal
- Source: ESPNcricinfo, 25 March 2016

Hirendra Mohan "Ganesh" Bose (2 July 1905 – 1 November 1975) was an Indian cricketer. He was a right-handed batter born in Calcutta (now Kolkata) and played in 11 first-class matches for Bengal between 1935/36 and 1942/43. He was a brother of both Bapi Bose and Kartick Bose who were also Bengal players.
