= Sankar Basu =

Electrical engineer

Sankar Basu is an American electrical engineer and a permanent program director at the National Science Foundation, where he manages programs in electronic design automation, micro and nano-electronic system, cyber-physical systems, as well as neuromorphic engineering.

Basu was named a Fellow of the Institute of Electrical and Electronics Engineers in 2002 "for contributions to theory and application of multidimensional circuits, systems, and signal processing." He was elected a Fellow of the American Association for the Advancement of Science in 2009. In 2011, Semiconductor Research Corporation recognized Basu with an award for enhancing its mission through collaboration. In 2024 the Swanson School of Engineering of the University of Pittsburgh awarded him the Distinguished alumnus award.
