= Kartick Bose =

Indian cricketer (1906–1984)

Personal information
- Full name: Nrirendra Mohan Bose
- Born: 6 August 1906; Calcutta, British India
- Died: 3 July 1984 (aged 77); Calcutta, India
- Batting: Right-handed
- Role: Batsman

Domestic team information
- Years: Team
- 1935/36–1951/52: Bengal
- 1935/36–1938/39: Hindus
- Source: ESPNcricinfo, 25 March 2016

Nrirendra Mohan "Kartick" Bose (6 August 1906 – 3 July 1984) was an Indian cricketer who played in 44 first-class matches between 1935/36 and 1951/52. He was in Bengal team through his full career and as well he played in Bombay Quadrangular for Hindus team until 1938/39. He was the brother of both Bapi Bose and Ganesh Bose who were also Bengal players.
