= Subroto Ghosh =

Indian cricketer (born 1987)

Personal information
- Born: 15 June 1987 (age 39); Patna, Bihar
- Batting: Right-handed
- Role: Wicket-keeper

Domestic team information
- Years: Team
- 1988–2009: Jharkhand
- Source: ESPNcricinfo, 26 May 2016

Subroto Ghosh (born 15 July 1987) is an Indian first-class cricketer who played for Jharkhand cricket team. He was a right-handed wicket-keeper batsman.
