= Nagendranath Basu =

- নগেন্দ্রনাথ বসু
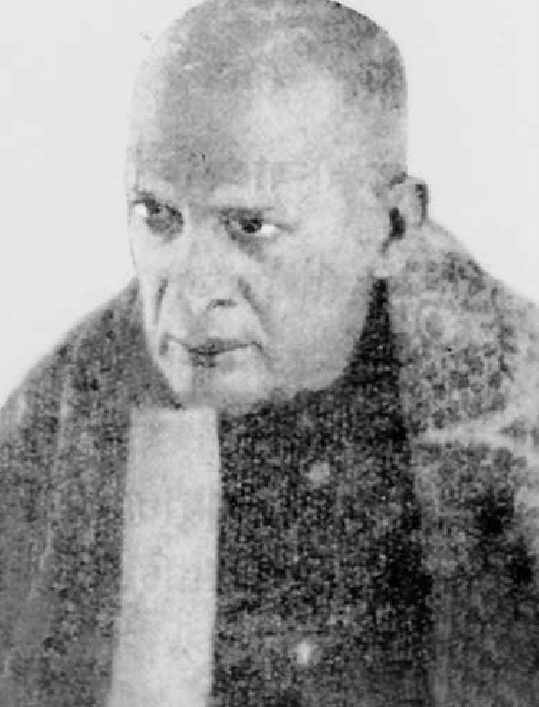
- Nagendranath Basu c. 1930s-early 1940s
- Born: 6 July 1866; Mahesh Village, Hooghly, Bengal, British India (now Hugli, West Bengal, India)
- Died: 11 October 1938 (aged 72); Calcutta, Bengal, British India (now Kolkata, West Bengal, India)
- Occupations: ·Encyclopedist ·Archaeologist ·Activist ·Historian
- Notable work: Shabdendu Mahakosh (1884); Bangla Bishwakosh (1885); Uttarrarhiya Kayastha Kanda (1910); Banger Jatiya Itihasa (1911)

Nagendranath Basu ( 6 July 1866 – 11 October 1938) was a Bengali encyclopedist, archaeologist, nationalist social historian and Kayastha activist.

== Early life ==
Nagendranath was born in the village of Mahesh located in Hooghly district, Bengal Presidency. He was born in a Bengali Kayastha family. He was the great-grandson of Tarini, sister of Ashutosh Deb.

== Kayastha Sabha ==
In 1902, Basu founded the Kayastha Sabha. Basu wrote for the Kayastha Patrika, the mouthpiece of the organisation where he used the term Kayastha to mean a diverse jati consisting of four smaller units with distinctive practices.

== Career ==
=== Archaeology and collector ===
Nagendranath was an official surveyor of Orissa government in Mayurbhanj district, and traveled widely to examine archaeological remnants, compiling numerous sculptures, coins and inscriptions. Most of these expeditions were self-funded and the collections were donated to Bangiya Sahitya Parishad.

He had also obtained a huge collection of ancient manuscripts (puthi) in Bengali, Sanskrit and Oriya, mostly from street-vendors and facilitated University of Calcutta to initiate its library in the Bengali Department.

=== Literature ===
Basu started his literary career with poems and novels, but soon became extensively involved in editing.

==== Editor ====
===== Journals =====
Basu edited multiple journals—the vernacular monthlies of Tapasvini and Bharat, Sahitya Parisad Patrika, the mouthpiece of the Bangiya Sahitya Parishad and Kayastha, the publication of the Kayastha Sabha (which he had founded).

===== Books and Texts =====
He also served as the editor of multiple contemporary Bengali authors and published numerous Middle Bengali classics—Chaitanya Mangala by Jayananda, Krishna Prema Tarangini by Raghunath Bhagavat Acharya, Kashi-Parikrama et al.—via Bangiya Sahitya Parishad. Nagendranath was also nominated to the Textbook Committee.

==== Author ====
In 1884, he published Shabdendu Mahakosh, an English-Bangla dictionary and in the process came in close contacts with Anandakrishna Basu (a grandson of Raja Radhakanta Deb) and Hara Prasad Shastri, who persuaded him to join The Asiatic Society. Nagendranath went on to write multiple scholarly books and essays on Bengali social history and allied historical affairs, in his roles at the society.

===== Bangla Bishwakosh =====
In the late 19th century, Basu gained widespread recognition as the compiler of the Bangla Bishwakosh, one of the most complete encyclopedias in Bangla (at that time). The first volume of Bangla Bishwakosh was compiled by Troilokyanath Mukhopadhyay (and his brother, Rangalal) in 1887; however all the subsequent volumes were compiled and published by Nagendranath, who held the reins from 1888 till the publication of the 22nd (and last) volume in 1911. A 24 volume translation in Hindi was compiled and published by Nagendranath from 1916 to 1931. A second Hindi edition entered compilation from 1933 onward; however, only four volumes were published before his death and the project remains incomplete.

===== Banger Jatiya Itihasa =====
A multi-volume work, this was based on kulapanjikas—genealogical histories of prominent families, and has been since considered as a magnum opus. It was sequentially published from 1911 to 1933. Basu gathered these kulapanjikas from ghataks (matchmakers) across the country, who used to hold high acclaim in the Bengali society as professional genealogists (to the extent of arbitrating disputes of societal status) and effectively served as tools of social memory.

The historicity of the source material for his work were rejected in near-entirety by a majority of the contemporary professional historians including Akshay Kumar Maitreya, Ramaprasad Chanda, R. C. Majumdar, R. D. Banerji et al., belonging to the logical-positivist school of thought. Not only the tales were emotionally charged verses with distinct impressions of caste-chauvinism but also they oft-contradicted each other, suffered from dating inaccuracies and failed to be corroborated by archaeological evidence. However Basu and others followed a romantic nativist school and considered them as a treasure trove of indigenous social history, wherein history did not merely mean a linear chronology of dynastic rulers and the state but rather the entirety of local caste-societies (samaja) with its own mythologies, traditions and material achievements, as experienced by the masses and reflected in kulapanjikas.

Material from different kulapanjikas were assimilated to form a history of the broader Bengali society.

===== Other samaja histories =====
Basu also wrote Uttarrarhiya Kayastha Kanda (1910), a sub-regional history of Uttar Rarh (a geographical region in North Bengal) by integrating the genealogical histories of various local caste-samajs—Kandi, Jemo, Rashra, Joyjan et al. A volume on the regional history of Burdwan and Kamarupa was also produced in similar manner. Patronage in various forms were provided by local aristocrats, rajahs and zamindars.

===== Miscellaneous =====
Basu had authored and edited volumes on the musical heritage of Bengal.

== Reception ==
Basu's historical methods have been challenged. His interpretations are now deemed to be of questionable reliability, courtesy his strong antipathy towards the Muslim rule in India and a rigid acceptance of the-then prevalent caste hierarchy as a social order. Projit Bihari Mukherjee also has accused him of being a dedicated Kayastha propagandist.

His usage of kulapanjika as authentic source(s) has not only introduced aspects of un-reliability but also espoused a Savarna view of the world; outright myths, legends and popular imaginations (esp. about the greatness of the Aryans and a pan-Bengali identity which aligned with Aryan traits) frequently pervade his works.

== Legacy and Honors ==
He was awarded the title of "Raysaheb" and "Prachyavidyamaharnav". On 17 March 1915, Kolkata Municipal Corporation renamed Basu's residential street of 8, Kantapukur Lane to Bishvakosh Lane, in commemoration of his pioneer efforts behind Bangla Bishwakosh.

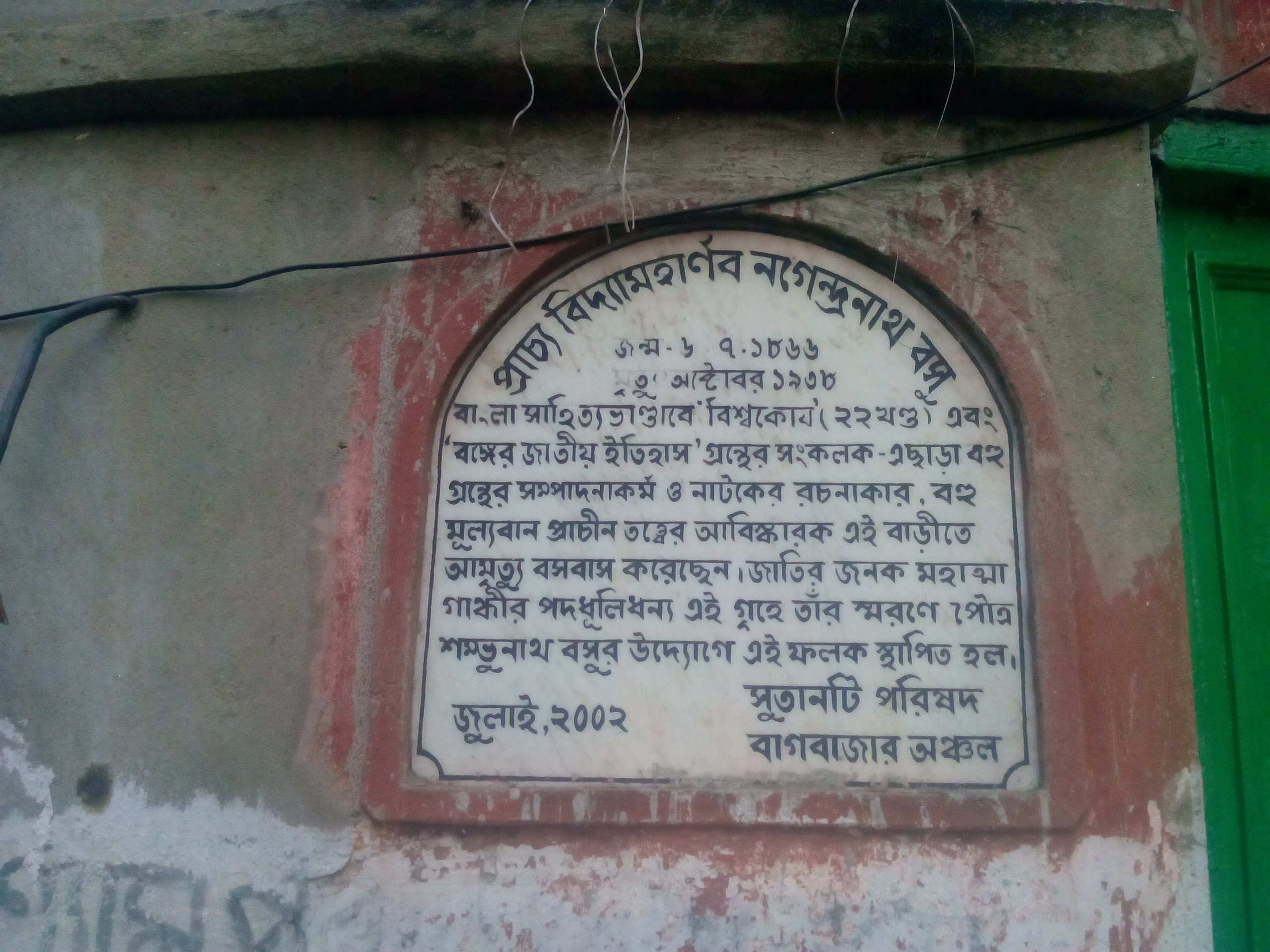
Nagendranath Basu Plate
