= Kulin Kayastha =

Sub-caste of the Kayastha caste in West Bengal, India

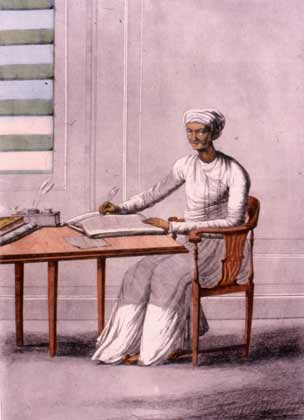
- A Kayastha of Calcutta, from a 19th century book

Languages
- Bengali

Religion
- Hinduism

Kulin Kayastha (Bengali: কুলীন কায়স্থ) is a sub-caste of the Bengali Kayastha caste in Bengal region of Indian subcontinent. They are also known as the Kulina Kayasthas.

The Kayasthas are regarded in Bengal, along with the Brahmins and Baidyas, as being the "highest Hindu castes". The Bengali Kayasthas are subdivided into numerous clans in that region, of which the Kulin is a high-ranking example.

== Origin ==
The social and religious patterns of Bengal had historically been distinctively different from those in the orthodox Hindu heartland of North India and this impacted on how the caste system developed there. Bengal, being located east of the traditional Aryavarta region between the Ganges and Yamuna rivers, remained insulated from the full impact of Brahminical orthodoxy for many centuries, and the impact of Buddhism remained strong there. The influence of Buddhism continued under the Buddhist rulers of the Pala dynasty from the eighth through the eleventh century CE.

It is traditionally believed that at this point, after the decline of the Pala Empire, a Hindu king, Adi Sura brought in five Brahmins and their five attendants from Kanauj, his purpose being to provide education for the Brahmins already in the area whom he thought to be ignorant, and revive traditional orthodox Brahminical Hinduism. Multiple accounts of this legend exist, and historians generally consider this to be nothing more than myth or folklore lacking historical authenticity. Likewise, the original varna status of the five attendants, accompanying the Brahmins, according to the legend, is also a subject matter of debate. Many sources mention them as Shudra servants, many others refer to them as Kayastha attendants, and very few as Aryan Kshatriya consorts. The tradition continues by saying that these incomers settled and each became the founder of a clan. In the case of the five attendants, each clan was of the Kayastha caste, and these founders are sometimes referred to as the five legendary Kayasthas. According to Swarupa Gupta, "this legend was fitted into a quasi-historical, sociological narrative of Bengal and deployed to explain the realities of caste and sub-caste origins and connections during the late nineteenth and early twentieth century".

The four Brahmin clans were each designated as Kulina ("superior") in order to differentiate them from the more established local Brahmins. Four of the Kayastha clans were similarly designated. The fifth was refused the status because they would not accept that they were servants or attendants and hence inferior, and instead proclaimed themselves to be superior even to the Brahmins. While this fifth clan remained in Bengal and became the Datta (or Dutta), one of the four which were granted the Kulina nomenclature - the Guhas - later moved to the east of the region, leaving three clans to become the main Kulin Kayastha communities in "Bengal proper" - the Boses, the Mitras and the Ghoshes.

== History ==
During the Gupta Empire, the Kayasthas had not developed into a distinct caste, although the office of the Kayasthas (scribes) had been instituted before the beginning of the period, as evidenced from the contemporary smritis. Tej Ram Sharma, an Indian historian, says that

Noticing brahmanic names with a large number of modern Bengali Kayastha cognomens in several early epigraphs discovered in Bengal, some scholars have suggested that there is a considerable brahmana element in the present day Kayastha community of Bengal. Originally the professions of Kayastha (scribe) and Vaidya (physician) were not restricted and could be followed by people of different varnas including the brahmanas. So there is every probability that a number of brahmana families were mixed up with members of other varnas in forming the present Kayastha and Vaidya communities of Bengal.

A period of rule by various Muslim dynasties began in Bengal from the thirteenth century and lasted until 1765, when the British gained control. Many of the population converted to Islam and the lack of a Hindu king as a focal point caused the isolation of those Hindu communities which remained. The Kulin communities suffered particularly badly because their ritual role was to serve a Hindu king via appointments to high state and religious offices, which were denied to them by Muslim rule. Those Hindus, including some Kulins, who did assist, co-operate or mingle with the Muslim rulers were often shunned by the increasingly conservative Hindu community, which was intent on self-preservation and withdrew into its own cultural norms in order to achieve that. Thomas J. Hopkins has said that

In relations with Muslims, it was clear that high-caste Hindus played a zero-sum game in which the degree of involvement with non-Hindu rulers meant a corresponding loss in Hindu social ranking.

Similarly, the Kulin castes generally ignored the British who came into the area and eventually took it over. The British were non-Hindu and so they, like the Muslims before them, were unable to satisfy the Kulin need for roles befitting their ritual status. Other Hindu communities, however, did co-operate with the British and by the early years of the nineteenth century some had become substantial landowners and wealthy people as a consequence. These non-Kulin communities also were the first to take steps towards Westernisation, in part because they realised that alignment with Western ideas would provide a route by which they could advance their social status, and that was something which could never occur under the Hindu ritual system as they would always be ranked lower than the Kulins.

A survey of Indian writers and observers suggests that many of those acquainted with the Kayasthas considered them as Dvija or twice-born. However, the claims of Kayasthas of Bengal of having Dvija status is not supported by many other Indian observers. The Bengali Brahmins were most active in refuting these claims.

== See also ==
- Maulika Kayastha
