= Sreyashi Jhumki Basu =

American academic (1977–2008)

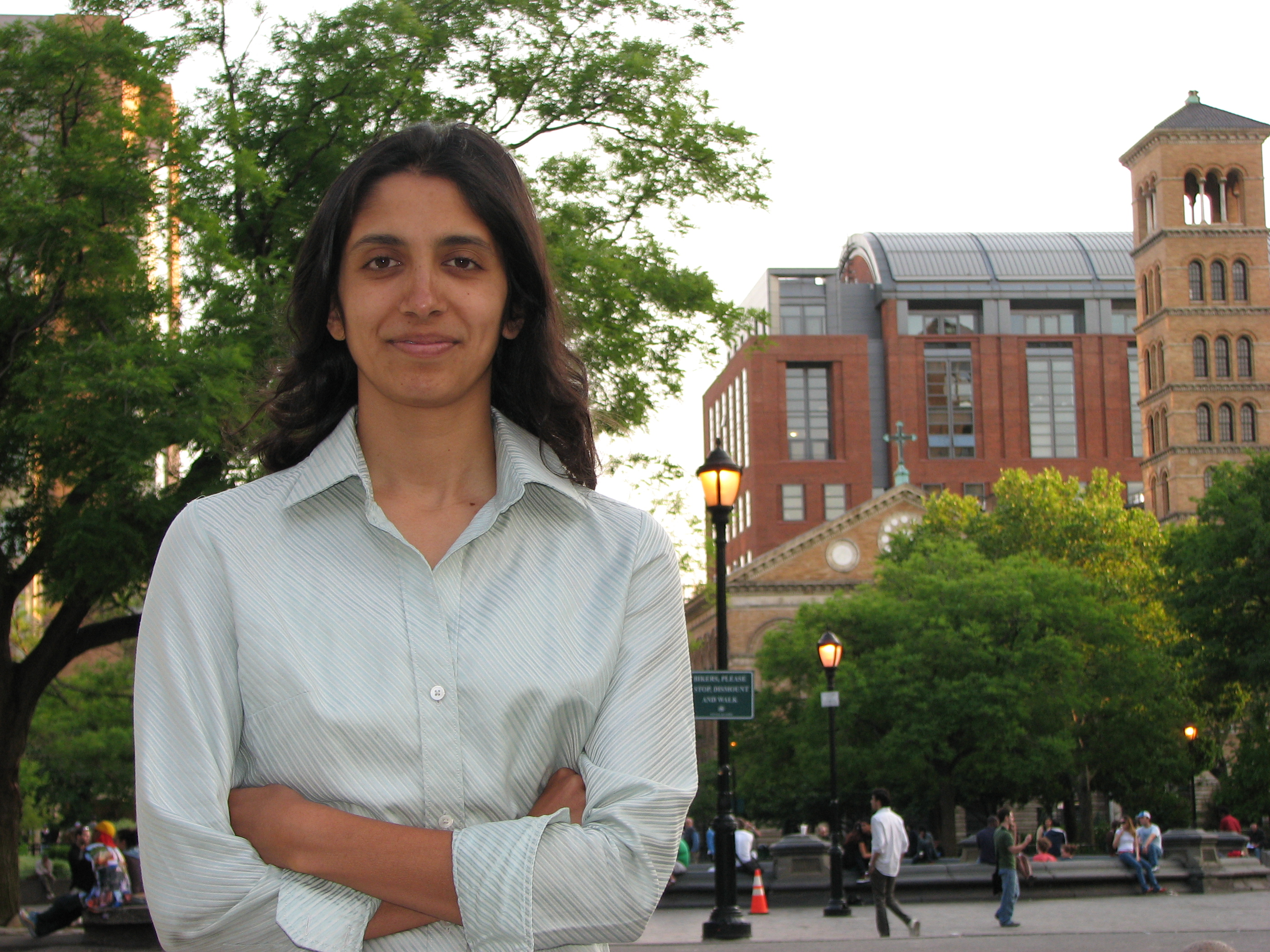
- Born: 1977
- Died: 2008 (aged 30–31)
- Education: Stanford University; Teachers College, Columbia University
- Known for: science education
- Scientific career
- Workplaces: New York University
- Thesis: How urban youth express critical agency in a 9th grade conceptual physics classroom (2006)

Sreyashi Jhumki Basu (1977–2008) was a professor of Science Education at New York University who is best known for her work to encourage urban minority students to succeed through the study of science.

== Background ==
Basu attended Stanford University, where she received a B.A. in Human Biology in 1998 and completed her doctorate in Science Education at Teachers College, Columbia University in 2006. For her PhD thesis titled How urban youth express critical agency in a 9th grade conceptual physics classroom, she received the Outstanding Dissertation Award in Division K (Science Education) from the American Educational Research Association.

Later in 2006 she joined NYU's Steinhardt School of Culture, Education, and Human Development as an associate professor.

Basu won the 2008 research fellowship from the Knowles Foundation for her work on the interpretation of democratic science pedagogy by new science teachers.

Basu served as co-founder, acting assistant principal and science department chair at the New York City Department of Education School for Democracy and Leadership in Brooklyn, New York (2003-6).

Castilleja School in Palo Alto awarded its Distinguished Alumni award to Dr. Basu in its centennial year and dedicated a garden in her memory.

== Death ==
Basu died in 2008 due to breast cancer.

== Publications ==
Basu co-authored the textbook, Democratic Science Teaching, Building the Expertise to Empower Low-Income Minority Youth in Science.

Other publications of Dr. Basu include:

1. Basu, S.J. (2008). Powerful learners and critical agents: The goals of five urban Caribbean youth in a conceptual physics classroom. Science Education, 92(2), 252–277.
2. Basu, S.J. (2008). How students design and enact physics lessons: Five immigrant Caribbean youth and the cultivation of student voice. Journal of Research in Science Teaching, 45(8).
3. Basu, S.J. (2008). Empowering communities of research and practice by conducting research for change and including participant voice in reflection on research. Cultural Studies in Science Education.
4. Milne, C., Kirch, S., Basu, S.J., Leou, M. & Fraser-Abder, P. (2008). Understanding Conceptual Change: Connecting and Questioning. Cultural Studies in Science Education. (online publication Feb 2008).
5. Basu, S.J., Calabrese Barton, A., Locke, D. and Clairmont, N. (Online publication, June 2008). Developing a framework for critical physics agency through case study. Cultural Studies in Science Education.
