= Sudip Mazumder =

Sudip K. Mazumder
- Education: Virginia Tech, Rensselaer Polytechnic Institute (RPI)
- Title: Robert Uyetani Professor of Engineering; joint appointment, U. S. Argonne National Laboratory
- Honors: IEEE Distinguished Lecturer
- Scientific career
- Fields: Electronic engineering
- Workplaces: UIC, PNNL, Virginia Tech, Crompton Greaves, Kollmorgen, RPI, BHEL
- Doctoral advisor: Dushan Boroyevich and Ali H. Nayfeh

Sudip K. Mazumder is a Distinguished Professor, Robert Uyetani Professor of Engineering, and the director of the Laboratory for Energy and Switching-Electronic Systems (LESES) in the Department of Electrical and Computer Engineering at the University of Illinois Chicago (UIC). He is also holds a joint appointment with the U.S. Argonne National Laboratory and is the president of NextWatt LLC. His research has focused on multi-scale control of power-electronic systems, wide-bandgap high-frequency-link power electronics, and optically-controlled power semiconductor devices and power electronics.

== Early life and education ==
Mazumder received his Ph.D. degree from the Deprtment of Electrical and Computer Engineering at Virginia Tech in 2001 and his M.S. degree from the Deprtment of Electrical Power Engineering at Rensselaer Polytechnic Institute (RPI) in 1993. At Virginia Tech and RPI, he conducted his doctoral and masters work in power electronics.

== Recognition ==
Dr. Mazumder was named a Fellow of the Institute of Electrical and Electronics Engineers (IEEE) in 2016 for his contributions to the analysis and control of power-electronic systems and a Fellow of the American Association for the Advancement of Science (AAAS) in 2020 for distinguished contributions to the field of multi-scale control and analysis of power-electronic systems. He is also a Fellow of the Asia-Pacific Artificial Intelligence Association (AAIA) since 2022. He is the recipient of the 2023 IEEE Power & Energy Society's Ramakumar Family Renewable Energy Excellence Award for contributions to high frequency link power conversion and control technologies for renewable energy. He was an IEEE Distinguished Lecturer and is the current the editor-in-chief-elect for IEEE Journal of Emerging and Selected Topics in Power Electronics (JESTPE). He was the recipient of the U.S. National Science Foundation (NSF) CAREER Award in 2003 and the U.S. Office of Naval Research (ONR) Young Investigator Award in 2005.
