= Bengali Kayastha =

Bengali Hindu of the Kayastha caste

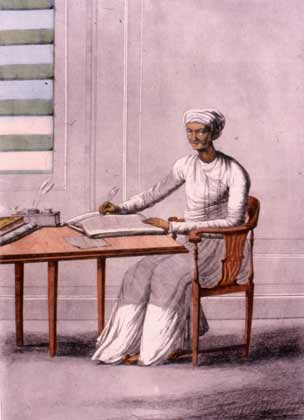
- A Kayastha of Calcutta, from a 19th-century book

Regions with significant populations
- Bengal

Languages
- Bengali

Religion
- Hinduism

Bengali Kayastha is a Bengali Hindu caste that originated from the Bengal region of the Indian subcontinent and is one of the main subgroups of the Kayastha community. The historical caste occupation of Kayasthas throughout India has been that of scribes, administrators, ministers and record-keepers; the Kayasthas in Bengal, along with Brahmins and Baidyas, are regarded among the three traditional higher castes that comprise the "upper layer of Hindu society". During the British Raj, the Bhadraloks of Bengal were drawn primarily, but not exclusively, from these three castes, who continue to maintain a collective hegemony in West Bengal.

== History ==
The social and religious patterns of Bengal had historically been distinctively different from those in the orthodox Hindu heartland of North India, and this impacted how the caste system developed there. Bengal, being located east of the traditional Aryavarta (Aryan) region between the Ganges and Yamuna rivers, remained insulated from the full impact of Brahminical orthodoxy for many centuries. The influence of Buddhism remained strong there, continuing under the Buddhist rulers of the Pala dynasty from the eighth through the eleventh century CE.

During the Gupta period, Kayastha had not crystallised into a caste and represented a professional group. Kayasthas frequently appear in the Gupta inscriptions mostly as professional writers or scribes. The importance of the lekhaka, or writer, seems to have increased during the Gupta period; the term 'Kayastha' was a part of the Gupta administrative terminology. A number of inscriptions during this period mention the office of Prathama-Kayastha, meaning chief scribe in the administrative office, and represented "probably the Chief Secretary to the administrative Board".

According to Tej Ram Sharma, an Indian historian, the office of Kayastha in Bengal was instituted before the Gupta period (c. 320 to 550 CE), although there is no reference to Kayastha as a caste at that time. He says that

The names of brahmanas occurring in our inscriptions sometimes end in a non-brahmanic cognomen such as Bhatta, Datta and Kunda, etc., which are available in the inscriptions of Bengal. Surnames like Datta, Dama, Palita, Pala, Kunda (Kundu), Dasa, Naga and Nandin are now confined to Kayasthas of Bengal but not to brahmanas. Noticing brahmanic names with a large number of modern Bengali Kayastha cognomens in several early epigraphs discovered in Bengal, some scholars have suggested that there is a considerable brahmana element in the present day Kayastha community of Bengal. Originally the professions of Kayastha (scribe) and Vaidya (physician) were not restricted and could be followed by people of different varnas including the brahmanas. So there is every probability that a number of brahmana families were mixed up with members of other varnas in forming the present Kayastha and Vaidya communities of Bengal.

Sharma also mentions that D. R. Bhandarkar "has pointed out that identical surnames are used by the Nagara-brahmanas". Referring to Naishadha Charita and Usanas-samhita smriti, Rabindra Nath Chakraborty mentions that according to these two medieval texts, "the Kayasthas were descended from Nagara Brahmins who had a large settlement in Bengal in the eighth century AD". Although according to historian H. K. Barpujari, this argument of migration is not convincing because, in that scenario, the majority of the recipients of East Indian grants would likely be Nagara Brahmins. However, it is worth noting that they have not historically been held in high esteem in this region. R. C. Majumdar noted that the evidence in support of a significant immigration of Nagara Brahmins in Bengal is not very convincing and the occurrence of Nagara Brahmin surnames like Datta, Ghosha, Varman, Nag, and Mitra among Kayasthas in Bengal also does not hold much significance, as these surnames were commonly used throughout India during that time period. Again, Harald Tambs-Lyche states that Nagars are usually associated with Kayasthas across India, although they were influential in the traditional society in Gujarat only. He notes that neither Anavils nor Nagars were predominantly priests and questions whether they became Brahmins due to their position or if the position was delegated to them. He further states that "even if we do not accept the theory of a common Nagar/Kayastha origin, it would seem that the Kayasthas of Bengal are a parallel case. Yet they never attained Brahmin status. Perhaps this should be explained with reference to the presence of important high - status priestly Brahmin elements in Bengal."

According to André Wink, another historian, the caste is first referred to around the 5th–6th century CE and may well have become so identified during the period of the Sena dynasty. Between that time and the 11th–12th century, they were not regarded as a caste by Sanskrit texts such as Rājatarangini but "as a category of 'officials' or 'scribes'". This category of officials or scribes was composed of "putative" Kshatriyas and, "for the larger majority", Brahmins, who retained their caste identity or became Buddhists. As in South India, Bengal had lacked a clearly defined Kshatriya caste. The Pala, Sena, Chandra, and Varman dynasties and their descendants, who claimed the status of Kshatriya, "almost imperceptibly merged" with the Kayastha caste, "which also ranked as shudras". However, Richard M. Eaton opines that, after the absorption of remnants of these dynasties, Kayastha became "the region's surrogate Kshatriya or warrior class".

Sekhar Bandyopadhyay also places their emergence as a caste after the Gupta period. In the eleventh century, Bengal was in the grip of Brahminism. The Kayastha evolved into a caste (from a professional group) in the 10th-11th century CE. Ancient scripts and inscriptions record a class of royal officials of writers or accountants, denoted as Karana or Kayastha. Lexicographer Vaijayanti (11th century CE) appears to consider Kayastha and Karana as being synonymous and depicts them as scribes. Two early scriptures of Bengal also note a caste group called Karana. Some scholars consider Karana and Kayastha castes as identical or equivalent. Majumder claims that the Karana and Kayastha castes eventually fused to form a single caste in Bengal, like other parts of India. Referring to the linkages between class and caste in Bengal, Bandyopadhyay mentions that the Kayasthas, along with the Brahmins and Baidyas, refrained from physical labour but controlled land, and, as such, represented "the three traditional higher castes of Bengal". Eaton mentions that the Kayasthas continued as the "dominant landholding caste" even after the Muslim conquests on the Indian subcontinent, and absorbed the descendants of the region's old Hindu rulers.

In Bengal, between 1500 and 1850 CE, the Kayasthas were regarded as one of the highest Hindu castes in the region.

== Varna status ==
The Hindu community in Bengal was divided into only two varnas: Brahmins and Shudras. Hence, although the Bengali Kayasthas and Baidyas had a high social status along with Brahmins, their ritual status was low, according to Edmund Leach, S. N. Mukherjee, though it seems their ritual status is a subject of dispute as per other historians.

=== Colonial era ===
Bengali Kayasthas initially collaborated with the British, and their role as scribes allowed the British East India Company to consolidate its power in India. However, by the early 20th century, they had amassed great wealth, pursued English education, and emerged as rivals to the British government. The British reacted by defining them as a uniform caste and demoting them to the Shudra category in ethnographic surveys. A report by Herbert Hope Risley and Edward Albert Gait cited their failure to observe scriptural dogma and rejection of the sacred thread as the reason for the loss of their upper-caste status. Following the report, Bengali Kayastha activists such as Nagendranath Basu reacted by forming caste organisations such as the Kayastha Sabha, consisting of educated professionals like lawyers, teachers, and intellectuals belonging to the caste. Kayastha Patrika, a mouthpiece of the organisation, published articles elaborating why Kayasthas were not Shudras.

Colonial-era verdicts also declared Bengali Kayasthas as Shudras, relying on observations of their ritual practices. One of the earliest such verdicts, Rajcoomar Lal v. Bissessur Dayal (1884), adjudged the Shudra designation but was influenced by a 'semantic-historicist' argument that Bengali Kayasthas had been degraded from an earlier Kshatriya status. Nabaparna Ghosh states that these verdicts relied on the premise that Bengali Kayasthas were different from those of the United Provinces and Bihar, as they did not initiate themselves to sacred threads nor perform rituals at the time of adoption. Judges in these verdicts cited the lack of these rituals in Bengal as an example of its distinctiveness from other provinces, territorializing the Bengali Kayastha caste identity.

According to Ghosh, the 'territorialization' of caste by the Calcutta High Court validated the Bengali Kayasthas as a distinct homogenous identity in equal status to the Shudras. This identity was later 'internalised' and accepted by the Bengali Kayasthas who still rejected their colonial categorisation as Shudras, instead describing themselves as upper-castes in "a challenge to the dominance both of the colonial state and of Brahmins".

While analysing the last completed census of the British Raj (1931), Bellenoit notes that the Bengal census volume was "disturbingly ambiguous" in the case of Bengali Kayasthas and noted that in Bengal, "while it associated Kayasthas with the 'upper classes' of Brahmins and Vaishyas", on the other hand, Kayasthas have invariably been held to be Sudras.

A survey of Indian writers and observers suggests that many of those acquainted with the Kayasthas considered them as Dvija or twice-born. Bellenoit gives the examples of Rabindranath Tagore and Abdul Halim Sharar to illustrate this point. According to Bellenoit, "although Tagore had Bengal specifically in mind, he argued that the Dutts, Ghoshs and Guhas were of Kshatriya origin, again citing their 'respectability and prominence in administration and overall rates of literacy'". Abdul Sharar, who was well acquainted with them, also supported their claims of twice-born (Kshatriya and Vaishya origin), citing their high literacy rate, which a Shudra caste could not have achieved. However, the claim of Bengali Kayasthas of having Dvija status was not supported by Indian observers like Jogendra Nath Bhattacharya, who cited their rituals to refute their claims. The report of the 1931 census of Bengal noted that the 'better-placed' Kayastha community claimed Kshatriya status.

=== Modern views ===
Some scholars note that "Hindu communities labelled 'Kayastha' are found all over northern India, but historically, their social ranking was not uniform. At different times and in different places, those labelled Kayastha were accorded the same status as Brahmins, Kshatriyas or Sudras, and there was even a claim that they formed a fifth varna within the Hindu caste structure".

Professor Julius J. Lipner mentions that the varna status of the Bengali Kayasthas is disputed, and says that while some authorities consider that they "do not belong to the twice-born orders, being placed high up among the Shudras; for other authorities they are on a level with Kshatriyas, and are accorded twice-born status." According to John Henry Hutton, Kayastha is an important caste, which in Bengal "ranks next to Brahman"; the caste is now "commonly regarded as 'twice-born', and itself claims to be Kshatriya, though it was perhaps more often regarded as clean Sudra a hundred years ago". Sanyal mentions that due to the lack of Vaishya and Kshatriya categories in Bengal, all non-Brahmin castes of Bengal, including the "higher castes" are considered as Shudras; the Bengali Kayasthas are considered among the three uchchajatis, or higher castes, as their social standing has been high. Lloyd Rudolph and Susanne Rudolph mention that Ronald Inden (an anthropologist), after spending part of 1964–65 in Bengal, states in his dissertation on Kayasthas that inter-caste marriages are increasing among the urban educated "twice-born castes", Kayasthas, Brahmins, and Baidyas.

== Subcastes ==
=== Kulin Kayastha and Maulika Kayastha ===
According to Inden, "many of the higher castes of India have historically been organised into ranked clans or lineages". The Bengali Kayastha was organised into smaller sub-castes and even smaller ranked grades of clans (kulas) around 1500 CE. The four major subcastes were Daksina-radhi, Vangaja, Uttara-radhi and Varendra. The Dakshina-radhi and Vangaja subcastes were further divided into Kulina or Kulin ("high clan rank") and Maulika or Maulik, the lower clan rank. The Maulika had four further "ranked grades". The Uttara-radhi and Varendra used the terms "Siddha", "Sadhya", "Kasta" and "Amulaja" to designate the grades in their subcastes.

=== Origin myths ===
Bellenoit states that the Bengali Kayasthas are "largely seen as an offshoot of the main north Indian Kayasthas, they claim lineage from migrations into Bengal from the ancient capital of Kanauj at the request of Hindu Kings (900s) to settle the countryside. These Kayasthas took on the well known names of Ghosh, Mitra and Dutt. Over time they fashioned themselves as a Gaur subdivision of a broader Kayastha group, who claimed north Indian origins".

Kulin Kayasthas, a subcaste of Bengali Kayasthas, have an associated myth of origin stating that five Kayasthas accompanied the Brahmins from Kannauj who had been invited to Bengal by the mythological king Adisur. Multiple versions of this legend exist, all considered by historians to be myth or folklore lacking historical authenticity. According to Swarupa Gupta, this legend was

... fitted into a quasi-historical, sociological narrative of Bengal and deployed to explain the realities of caste and sub-caste origins and connections during the late nineteenth and early twentieth century.

According to this legend, the five original Kayastha clans are Bose/Basu, Ghosh, Mitra, Guha, and Datta, the first four of whom became Kulin Kayasthas; the legend talks about the migration of Brahmins with the five Kayasthas, from Kannauj to Bengal.

A modern genetic study evaluating this myth found that "individuals belonging to some of the Kayastha lineages, whether termed Kulin or Moulik in later times, show genetic relatedness with present-day populations in Uttar Pradesh (Bose, Pal), while others show a significant genomic contribution from South India, or do not yield any informative signal on the basis of available Indian populations for comparisons (Nandi)."

== Notable people ==
- Pratapaditya, the king of Jessore who declared independence from Mughal rule in the early 17th century
- Kirtinarayan Basu, 17th-century Raja of Chandradwip who converted to Islam
- Sri Aurobindo, Indian philosopher, yogi and nationalist
- Nagendranath Basu, historian and editor
- Jagadish Chandra Bose, Indian scientist
- Subhas Chandra Bose, popularly known as Netaji ("Respected Leader")
- Nirad C. Chaudhuri, Indian writer
- Debapratim Purkayastha, Indian educator and best-selling author
- Satyendra Prasanna "Prasad" Sinha, 1st Baron Sinha
- Swami Vivekananda (b. Narendranath Datta)
- Paramahansa Yogananda, author of Autobiography of a Yogi
- Jyoti Basu, longest-serving CM of West Bengal.
- Bidhan Chandra Roy, first chief minister of West Bengal.
- Khudiram Bose, Indian revolutionary who, at age 18, became one of the youngest martyrs of India's freedom struggle when hanged by the British for attempting to assassinate a British judge.
- Satyajit Ray, Indian filmmaker, writer, and composer, widely regarded as one of the greatest directors in world cinema.
- Manik Sarkar, Longest serving Chief Minister of Tripura.
- Satyendra Nath Bose, Indian physicist who pioneered quantum statistics, originatingBose–Einstein statistics and the concept of bosons, particles that follow his statistics.
