= Bose (surname) =

Origin
- Origin: Bengali Hindu
- Region of origin: Bengal

Bose (Bengali: বসু; Bengali pronunciation: [bɔʃu]) is a surname. In Bengal, the surname is an anglicized form of the Bengali Kayastha surname Basu. Another European surname Bose, sometimes as von Bose or Bosé, stems from Germanic Boso, which means leader, nobleman, or arrogant person.

== Notables of Indian descent ==
=== A ===
- Abala Bose (Lady Bose) (1865–1951), Indian social worker
- Amar Bose (1929–2013), MIT professor, founder and chairman of the Bose Corporation
- Amit Bose (government official) Administrator of Federal Railroad Administration
- Amit Bose (1930–2019), Indian filmmaker
- Aniruddha Bose judge of Supreme Court of India since 2019
- Ankiti Bose (born 1992), Indian entrepreneur who works on the digitisation of the textile and apparel industry
- Ashish Bose (1930–2014), Demographer who coined BIMARU

=== B ===
- Bipin Krishna Bose Barrister, first Vice Chancellor of Nagpur University (1923–1928)

=== C ===
- C. V. Ananda Bose, Governor of Bengal

=== F ===
- Fanindra Nath Bose (1888–1926), Bengal-born sculptor

=== G ===
- Girish Chandra Bose (1853–1939), Indian educator and botanist

=== H ===
- Hemendra Mohan Bose, entrepreneur

=== J ===
- Sir Jagadish Chandra Bose (1858–1935), Bengali physicist, science fiction writer, and student of radio science
- Acharya Jayanta Bose, a Hindustani classical musician and composer

=== K ===
- Kamal Bose (1915–1995), Indian cinematographer
- Khudiram Bose (1889–1908), Indian freedom fighter

=== M ===
- Mihir Bose (born 1947), Indian-born British journalist, former BBC's sports editor

=== N ===
- N. S. Chandra Bose (1932–2010), medical doctor and politician
- Nandalal Bose (1883–1966), Indian painter

=== P ===
- Pratap Bose (born 1974), British-Indian automotive designer

=== R ===
- Rahul Bose (born 1967), Indian actor
- Raj Chandra Bose (1901–1987), Indian mathematician and statistician
- Rash Behari Bose (1886–1945), Indian freedom fighter

=== S ===
- Sachindra Prasad Bose (died 1941), designer of the Calcutta Flag
- Sahay Ram Bose (1888–1970), Indian botanist
- Sarat Chandra Bose (1889–1950), Indian lawyer and freedom fighter (brother of Subhas Chandra Bose)
- Sarmila Bose (born 1959), Indian journalist and researcher
- Satyendra Nath Bose (1894–1974), Indian physicist, known for the Bose–Einstein collaborations
- Shree Bose (born 1994), American scientist
- Soumya Sankar Bose (born 1990), Indian artist and photographer
- Subhas Chandra Bose (1897–1945), fighter of the Indian independence movement and personality of the Indian National Army
- Subhasish Bose (born 1995), Indian footballer
- Sudhindra Bose (1883–1946), pioneer in teaching Asian politics and civilization in the United States
- Sudip Bose, American emergency physician
- Sugata Bose (born 1956), Harvard professor, Member of Parliament and grandnephew of Netaji Subhas Chandra Bose
- Swadesh Bose (1928–2009), Bangladeshi economist

=== U ===
- Uma Bose (1921–1942), 'The Nightingale of Bengal', musical prodigy

=== V ===
- Vivian Bose (1891–1983), judge of the Supreme Court of India
- Vanu Bose

== European origin ==
- Georg Matthias Bose, (1710–1761), Leipzig born professor of natural philosophy and electrostatics inventor
- Sterling Bose (1906–1959), American jazz trumpeter and cornetist

=== von Bose ===
von Bose is an unrelated German surname

- Hans-Jürgen von Bose (born 1953), German composer
- Herbert von Bose (1893–1934), German civil servant
- Jobst-Hilmar von Bose (1897–1949), German soldier
- Julius von Bose (1809–1894), Prussian Army general
- Countess Louise von Bose (1813–1883), German philanthropist

=== Bosé ===
- Lucia Bosè (Italian spelling, born Lucia Borloni) or Lucía Bosé (Spanish spelling) (1931–2020), Italian actress
- Miguel Bosé (born 1956), Spanish singer and son of Lucia Bosè

== See also ==
- Bose (given name)
