= Sudip Bose =

American emergency physician

- Born: Ann Arbor, Michigan
- Education: Naperville Central High School, Northwestern University (Bachelor of Arts), Northwestern University Feinberg School of Medicine (MD)
- Occupations: Emergency medicine physician, Professor
- Known for: Disaster and mass casualty medicine

Sudip Bose is an American emergency medicine physician, military combat veteran and a clinical professor. He serves as an emergency physician at Medical Center Hospital in Texas and is a professor at the Texas Tech University Health Sciences Center and at the University of Illinois College of Medicine.

Bose was the recipient of the CNN Hero recognition that he received for treating Saddam Hussein, after his capture by the US Army in December 2003. He has also been awarded the Combat Medical Badge, the US Army Commendation Medal and the Bronze Star Medal for his military service.

== Early life and education ==
Bose was born in Michigan to Indian immigrant parents. He completed high school at Naperville Central High School and was selected for the Northwestern University Feinberg School of Medicine Honors Program in Medical Education while he was in high school. He completed his undergraduate studies at Northwestern University and graduated as an MD at the age of 25.

== Career ==
=== Military career ===
Bose completed his emergency medicine training and then served in the Iraq war as an Army Battalion Surgeon for the 1st Battalion, 5th Cavalry Regiment, 1st Cavalry Division treating war casualties in Iraq. He also served as an emergency physician at the Baghdad combat support hospital. Bose was formerly a major in the US Army and served in the US military for 12 years. His service includes a 15-month deployment to Iraq as a military physician and he was awarded the Bronze Star for his service.

Bose also served as a physician in the Second Battle of Fallujah. After Operation Red Dawn in 2003, Bose treated former Iraqi president, Saddam Hussein, for which he received congressional recognition.

=== Medicine career ===
Bose is known for his work in emergency medicine, mass casualty and disaster response, and post-traumatic stress disorder treatment. He has led the treatment of victims in several mass casualty events including the Midland-Odessa shooting, the 2004 Ashura bombings in Iraq, the Midland train crash, and the COVID-19 pandemic. Bose has spoken about medical preparedness and response at the United Nations General Assembly and his work has received Congressional recognition.

Bose stars in the Amazon Prime Video docuseries "Desert Doc", which follows his work as an emergency medicine physician at Medical Center Hospital in Odessa, Texas.

Bose serves as a congressional advisor on the health care advisory committee of August Pfluger, a member of the House Energy and Commerce Committee.

=== Business career ===
Bose is the founder of The Battle Continues, a nonprofit organization for the health of the veterans. The organization was founded in 2014. He is also a medical advisor with Dr. B, a public benefit corporation.

== Military decorations ==
=== Bronze Star Medal ===
Bronze Star Medal

Rank and organization: Captain, Headquarters and Headquarters Company, 1st Battalion, 5th Cavalry Regiment. place and date: Iraq War, September 1, 2004. Entered service at: Chicago, Ill. Born: Feb 22, 1974, Ann Arbor, Michigan

Citation:

Exceptionally meritorious service during combat and stability operations in Iraq. Captain Bose’s professionalism and competence were instrumental in over 12 months of continuous operations which ensured the success of the brigade’s mission.

=== Army Commendation Medal ===
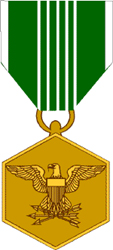
Army Commendation Medal

Rank and organization: Captain, 31st Combat Support Hospital. place and date: October 10, 2004. Entered service at: Chicago, Ill. Born: Feb 22, 1974, Ann Arbor, Michigan

Citation:

Outstanding meritorious service while assigned to medical task force 31. His dedication to duty and professionalism contributed greatly to the mission providing world class medical care to over 160,000 coalition partners during Operation Iraqi Freedom.
