= Israel Doniach =

British pathologist (1911–2001)

Israel Doniach FRCP (9 March 1911 – 11 February 2001) was a British physician, pathologist and expert on the causes and diagnosis of thyroid cancers. He was the first to show that radioactive iodine, which had been used for the diagnosis and treatment of patients with various types of thyroid disease, could itself be carcinogenic to the thyroid gland.

== Family ==
His wife was clinical immunologist Deborah Doniach (1912–2004). They had two children, Sebastian, a physicist, and Vera (1936–1958).
