= Dilip Ghosh (economist) =

Indian-American economist

Dilip Ghosh is an American economist, being Distinguished Professor at Bang School of Business, KIMEP University in 2014 and formerly the Hellenic Bank Association Associate Chair at Sofia University in 2009.

== Education ==
Ghosh received a Master of Business Administration from University of Rochester and a Ph.D. from State University of New York at Buffalo.
