= Ajoy Ghose =

Indian mining engineer (died 2019)

Ajoy Ghose was an Indian mining engineer. Ghose was a Fellow of the Indian National Academy of Engineering. He died on 13 March 2019.

== Books ==
- Small Scale Mining: A Global Overview. India Book House Limited

ISBN 81-204-0763-6

- Engineered Rock Structures in Mining and Civil Construction. Taylor and Francis, London, 2006. (with R.N. Singh)
- Environment-friendly techniques of rock breaking. A. A. Balkema, Lisse, 2003. (with Janusz Reś and Krzysztof Wladzielczyk)

== Edited volumes ==
- Ghose, A.K., (Editor), Rock Mechanics- Theory and Practice, The Institution of Engineers(India), Calcutta, 1974
- Ghose, A.K., (Editor), Optimal Exploitation of Solid Mineral Resources: Challenges and Constraints, Proc. 12th World Mining Congress, The Institution of Engineers (India), Calcutta, 1984 Ghose, A.K., (Editor)., Strategies for Exploitation of Mineral Resources in Developing Countries, Oxford & IBH, New Delhi, 1987.
- Ghose, A.K., Simic, R., and Najberg, M. (Editors), 30 Years of World Mining Congress, SITRGMJ, Beograd, 1988.
- Ghose, A.K., and Ramani, R.V., (Editors), Longwall Thick Seam Mining, Oxford & IBH, New Delhi, 1988.
- Ghose, A.K., and Seshagiri Rao, H.S., (Editors), Rockbursts and Bumps- Global Experiences, Oxford & IBH, New Delhi, 1990.
- Ghose, A.K. (Technical Editor), English edition of "Coal Cutting by Winning Machines" (in Russian) by E.Z. Pozin, V.Z. Melamed, and V.V. Ton, Oxford & IBH, New Delhi, 1989.
- Ghose, A.K. (Editor), Small-Scale Mining – A Global Overview, Oxford & IBH, New Delhi, 1993.
- Ghose, A.K. (Technical Editor), English Translation of "Seismic Effects of Blasting in Rock" from Russian by A.A. Kuzmenko, V.D. Vorobev, I.I. Denisyek, and A.A. Dauetas, Oxford & IBH, New Delhi, 1993.
- Ghose, A.K. (Editor), English Translation of "Rock Breakage by Blasting" from Russian by M.I. Petrosyan, Oxford & IBH, New Delhi, 1994.
- Ghose, A.K. (Technical Editor), English Translation of "Mining and Industrial Applications of Low Density Explosives" from Russian by Baranov, Vedin and Bondarnko, Oxford & IBH, New Delhi, 1996
- Ghose, A.K. (Editor), Small/Medium Scale Mining, Oxford & IBH, New Delhi, 1997 (Republished as "Mining on Small and Medium Scale- A Global Perspective" by Intermediate Technology Publications, London, 1997).
- Ghose, A.K., and Bose, L.K (Editors)., Mining in the 21st Century, Proc. of 19th World Mining Congress, New Delhi, Oxford & IBH, New Delhi, 2003.
- Ghose, A.K., and Dhar, B.B. (Editors), Mining Challenges of the 21st Century, APH Publishers, New Delhi, 2000.
