= Sena revolution of Bengal =

Mid 12th century revolution in Bengal

- Part of Sena dynasty
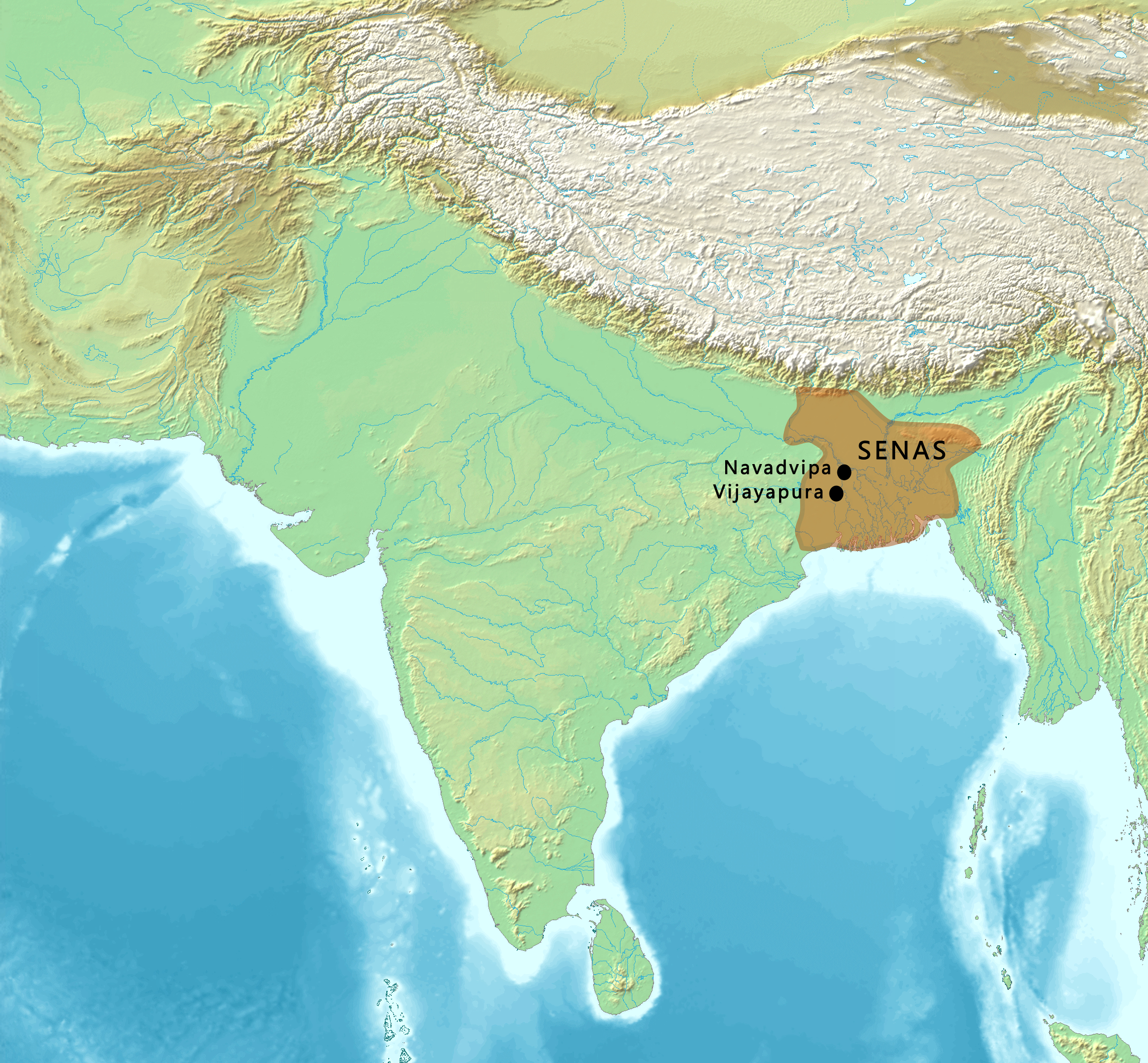
- Initial revolution map of sena dynasty.
Date	Mid 12th Century
Location	Bengal (region)
Result	Sena victory: Fall of the Pala empire; Fall of the Varmans
Territorial changes	Hemanta sena captured the Rarh region of Bengal; Pala empire and varman dynasty Annexed by Vijaya sena

Belligerents
Sena dynasty	Pala Empire	Varman dynasty (Bengal)

Commanders and leaders
Hemanta Sena; Vijaya Sena; Ballala Sena	Ramapala; Madanapala; Govindapala	Bhoja varman

Deopara Prashasti described the founder of Sena dynasty Samanthasena, as a migrant Brahmaksatriya from Karnataka. The epithet 'Brahma-Kshatriya' suggests that Senas were Brahmins by caste who took the profession of arms and became Kshatriyas. The Sena kings were also probably Baidyas, according to historian P. N. Chopra.

== Background ==
The Senas entered into the service of Palas as sāmantas in Rāḍha, probably under Samantasena. With the decline of the Pālas, their territory had expanded to include Vaṅga and a part of Varendra by the end of Vijayasena's reign. The Palas were ousted in totality, and their entire territory annexed sometime after 1165.

== Sena invasion of Pala ==
=== Hemanta Sena ===
The weakening of the Pala Empire allowed Hemanta to be granted the opportunity to govern Rarh and protect the emperors. He served this role from 1070 to 1096 CE. His son, Vijaya Sena, reigned after him.

=== Vijaya Sena ===
It is beyond any doubt that Vijaya Sena established independent power in Bengal immediately after the demise of Ramapala. The Deopara Prashasti records that he defeated Nanya, Vir, Raghav and Vardhan. He vanquished the kings of Kamarupa and Kalinga. He also compelled the king of Gauda to flee away from his kingdom. It is not very difficult to identify the rivals of Vijaya Sena. Nanya can be identified with King Nanyadeva (c 1097–1147 AD) of Mithila, another Karnat chief. Vir was perhaps Virgun, ruler of Kotatavi, a member of Rampala's samantachakra. Vardhan may be identified either with Dorpavardhan, ruler of Kausambi, or with Govardhan against whom Madanapala won a victory. Vijaya Sena's fight against Vir and Vardhan were perhaps meant to bring under control two other feudatory chiefs who also might have aspired for power. Raghav was no other than the king of Kalinga. He can be identified with Raghav, son of Anantavarman Chodaganga who ruled Orissa from c 1157–1170 AD. The encounter between Vijaya Sena and Raghav probably took place towards the end of the former's reign. It is not unlikely that Vijaya Sena had to wage war against Raghav, although he maintained a friendly relation with his father. Vijaya Sena's fight against Raghav was meant to frustrate the latter's aggressive designs. The reference in the Deopara prashasti to the fight between Vijaya Sena and the king of Kamrupa does not necessarily mean that the former invaded the province, although that is not impossible altogether. The king of Kamrupa, defeated by Vijaya Sena, was perhaps Vaidyadev, the minister of Kumarapala who declared independence, or his successor. It is not unlikely that Vaidyadev or his successor invaded the newly founded dominions of the Sens and was driven away by Vijaya Sena

=== Ballala Sena ===
He is the best-known Sena ruler and consolidated the kingdom. He might have completed the conquest of Northern Bengal and also conquered Magadha and Mithila. He ended the Pala Empire by defeating Govindapala

Ballal Sen was descended from the royal family of Bengal, who proceeded to Delhi, and was proclaimed emperor of Hindoostan.

== Sena invasion of Varman ==
Bhoja Varman, son of Samalavarman was the last independent ruler of Varman Dynasty and the Belava plate was issued in his fifth regnal year from the jayaskandhavara situated at Bikramapura. He was defeated by Vijaysena of Sena Dynasty and rule of Varmans over southeast Bengal came to an end.

== See also ==
- Lakshmana Sena
- Western Chalukya Empire
- History of Bengal
- History of India
