= Umapati Dhara =

Poet and minister in Bengal (c.1150–1240)

Personal life
- Born: c. 1120 Sonargaon (সুবর্ণগ্রাম), Bengal, Sena dynasty (in present-day Narayanganj District, Bangladesh)
- Died: c. 1220 (aged 99–100) Lakhnauti
- Relatives: Uddharan Dutta Thakura, Haladhar Sen, Gouri Sen
- Honors: Pancharatna, Pancharatna appeared in the court of King Lakshmanasena of Navadwipa in Bengal - Jayadeva, Umapati Dhara, Dhoyin, Sharan and Govardhana (poet) Article Talk are one jewel form of that Pancharatna .

Religious life
- Religion: Hinduism
- Denomination: Vaishnavism

Umapati Dhara (উমাপতি ধর, c. 1150–1240) was the chief minister in the court of Lakshmana Sena (ruler from the Sena dynasty of the Bengal region on the Indian subcontinent). and one of the court poets of Lakshmana Sena. Several Prashasti like the Deopara Prashasti, a stone inscription eulogizing the Sena kings of Bengal was written by him. He is one of the Pancharatna in the court of Lakshmana Sena. Jayadeva was the middle jewel of this Pancharatna. The identity of these four Kavibandhus of Jayadeva might have been lost forever if the poet Jayadeva had not mentioned their names and poetic qualities in 'Gita Govinda' However, earlier Lakshmanasena's court poet, Batudas's son Sridhardas, has compiled Saduktikarnamrita by including many verses of these four poets, he saved their poetry from oblivion. According to Jayadeva, Umapati Dhar's characteristic of writing was to enrich the words and sentences. His famous works were the Deoparaprashasti and the Madhainagar copper plates He also wrote a book Chandrachudacharita, in Sanskrit, which has not been found.

== Personal life ==
Umapati Dhara was born into a rich Jamindar family from the Bengali Baidya caste. He was one of the five gems of Sanskrit scholars, which was mentioned at the court of Lakshmana Sena. His father Kanjilal Dhar lived in Sonargram, whose sister Bhagabati Devi was married to Bhabesh Dutta relative of Gouri Sen a reputed gold merchant in the era of Ballāla Sena.

== See also ==
- Deopara Prashasti
- Lakshmana Sena
- Gita Govinda
- Ballāla Sena
