= Ballal Dhipi =

Archaeological site in West Bengal

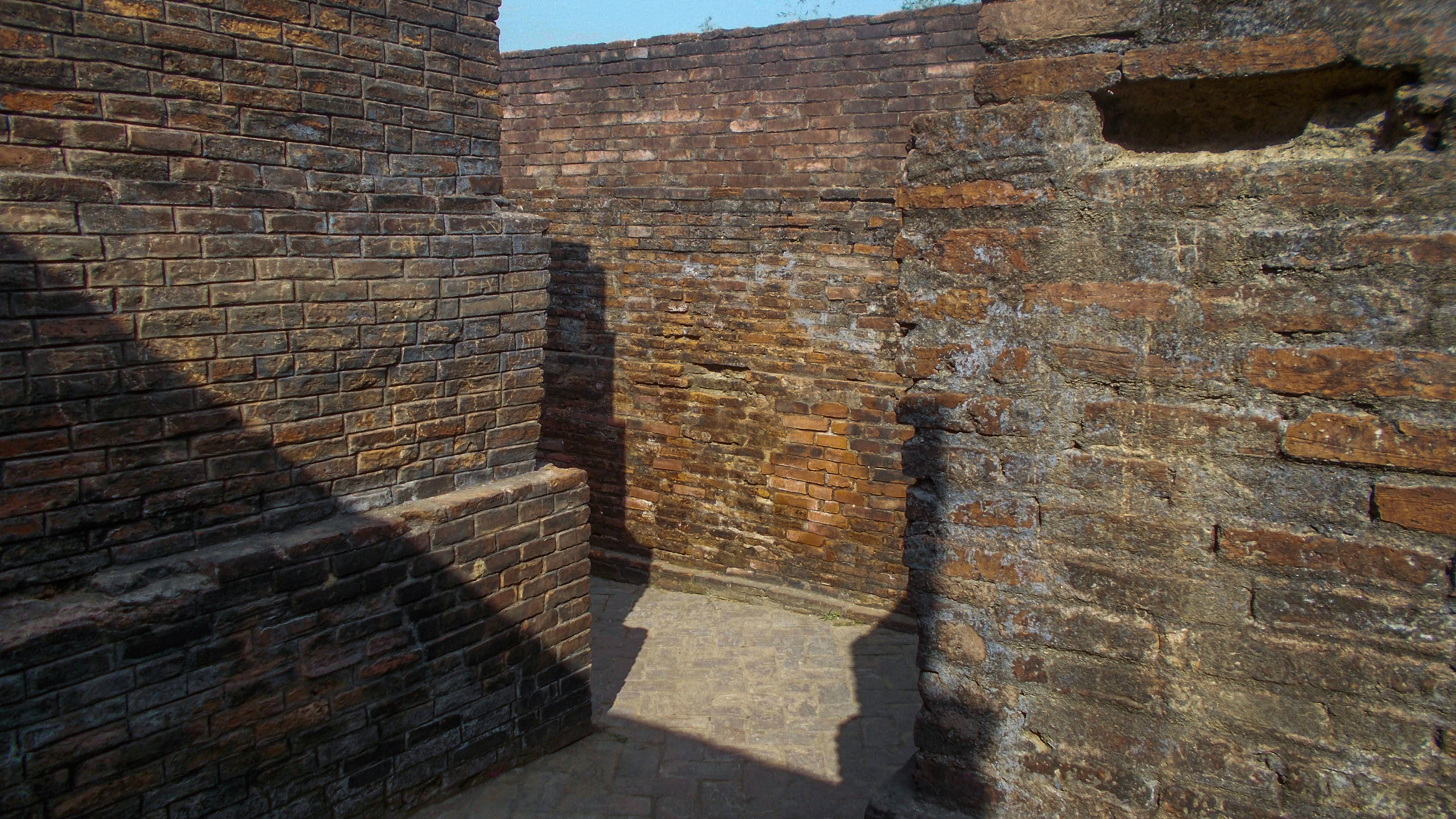
- Ballal Dhipi ruins

- Location within West Bengal Location within India
- 23.4484162°N 88.4030644°E
- Type: Buddhist Vihara
- Location: Bamanpukur, Nadia district
- Region: West Bengal, India

History
- Built: 10-12th century or a little earlier

Ballal Dhipi is a historic archeological site on the eastern flood plain of the Hooghly in Nadia, West Bengal, a few kilometres east of Nabadwip. The remains date back to the 12th century AD and earlier. A 30-ft structure of solid terracotta bricks is spread over an area of 1,300 sq ft. with a floor made of lime and sand. It is named after Ballala Sena (1160-1179) of the Sena dynasty.

Archaeologists have found traces of a temple complex. Historians differ on the origin of the structure. It may be the ruin of a Buddhist stupa or vihar, possibly built between the 11th and 13th centuries. It has similarities with Vikramshila Vihar, in Bihar and Shompur Vihar, in Rajshahi, Bangladesh. It may also be a part of the capital of the Sena dynasty.

== Geography ==
Cities and towns in Krishnanagr Sadar subdivision of Nadia district
M: municipal town/ city, CT: census town, R: rural/ urban centre, H: place of historical/ religious interest, T: place of tourist interest.
Owing to space constraints in the small map, the actual locations in a larger map may vary slightly

=== Location ===
Ballal Dhipi is located at Bamunpukur, near Mayapur and Nabadwip, 23.4503°N 88.4014°E.

Note: The map alongside presents some of the notable locations in the subdivision. All places marked in the map are linked in the larger full screen map.

=== Excavations ===
The Kolkata Circle of the Archaeological Survey of India excavated the mound, during 1982-1988, and "exposed huge brick structures and various antiquities datable to c. 10th to 12th cent. AD. The brick structure include shrines on sides and a massive construction within an enclosure." The antiquities indicate the possibility of Buddhist affiliation. The structural complex covers nearly 13,000 m^{2}. Experts opine the "stupa(vihara) of eighth/ ninth century was perhaps a seat of learning and pilgrimage up to the end of the 11th century." It is about 25 km from Krishnanagar.

The ASI has divided the site into two parts – the mound and the remains of a fort. Both the sites are identified as an ASI listed monument.

== Ballal Dhipi picture gallery ==
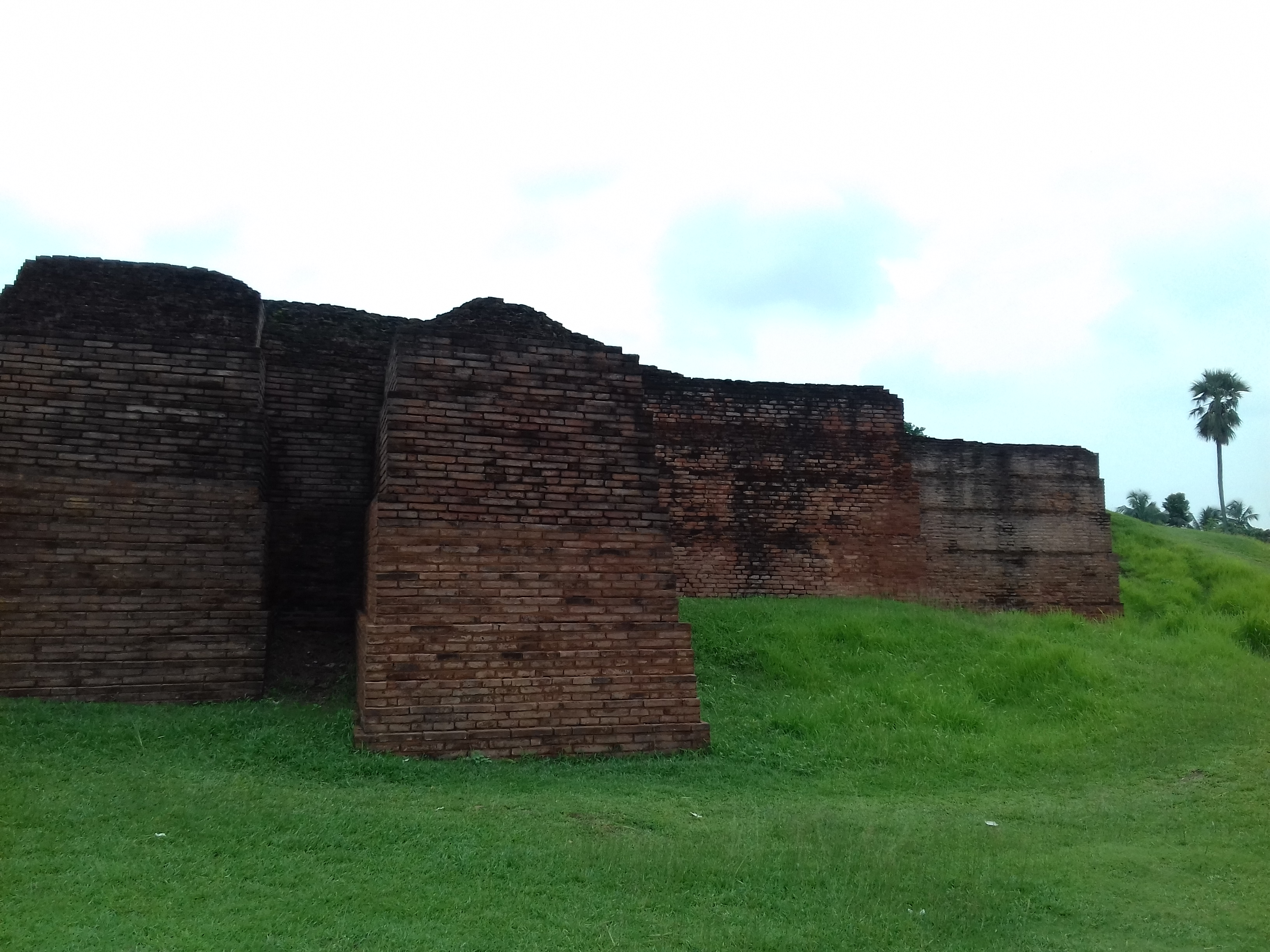
It is thought to be the remains of a fort

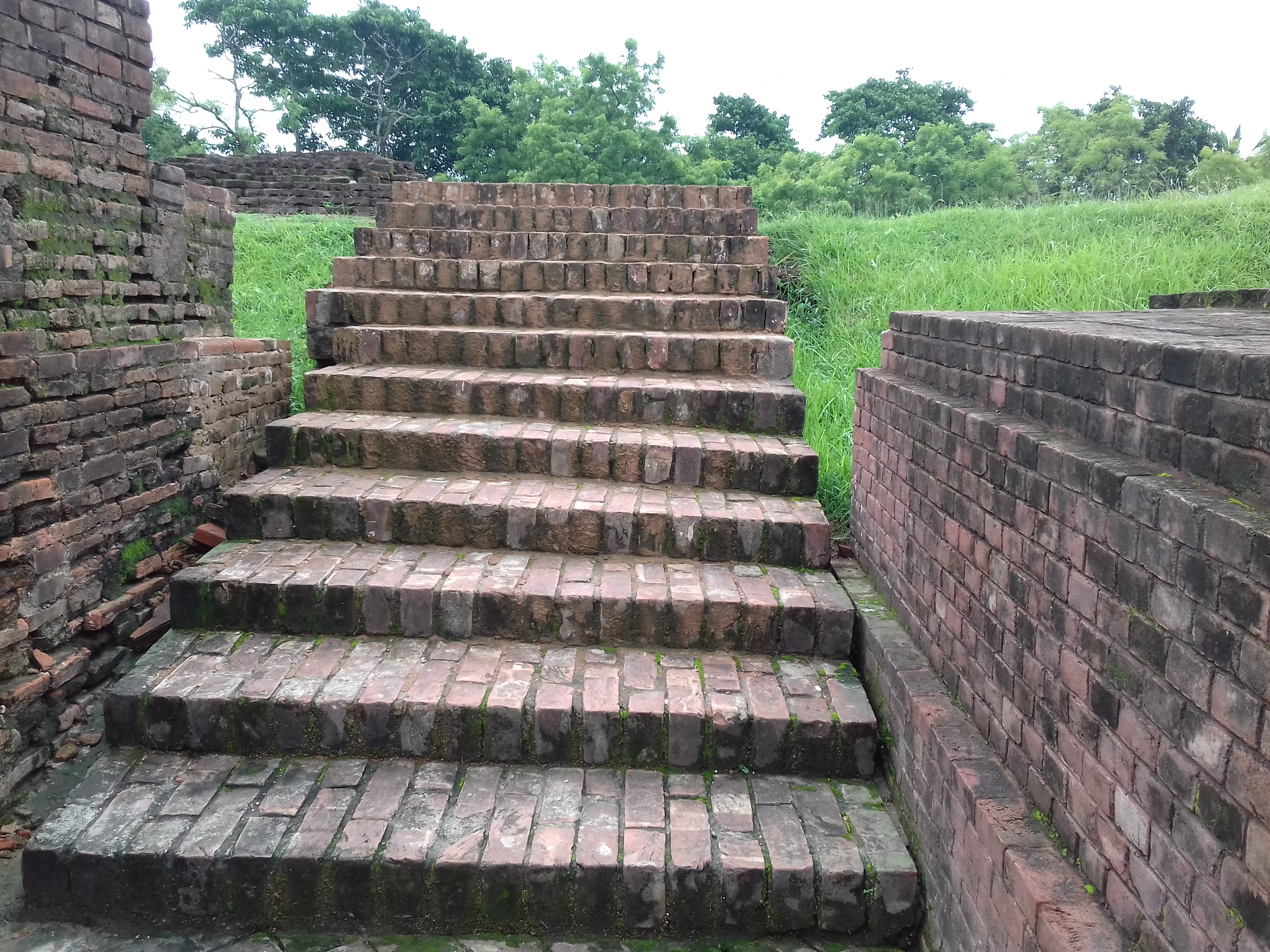
The remains of a staircase

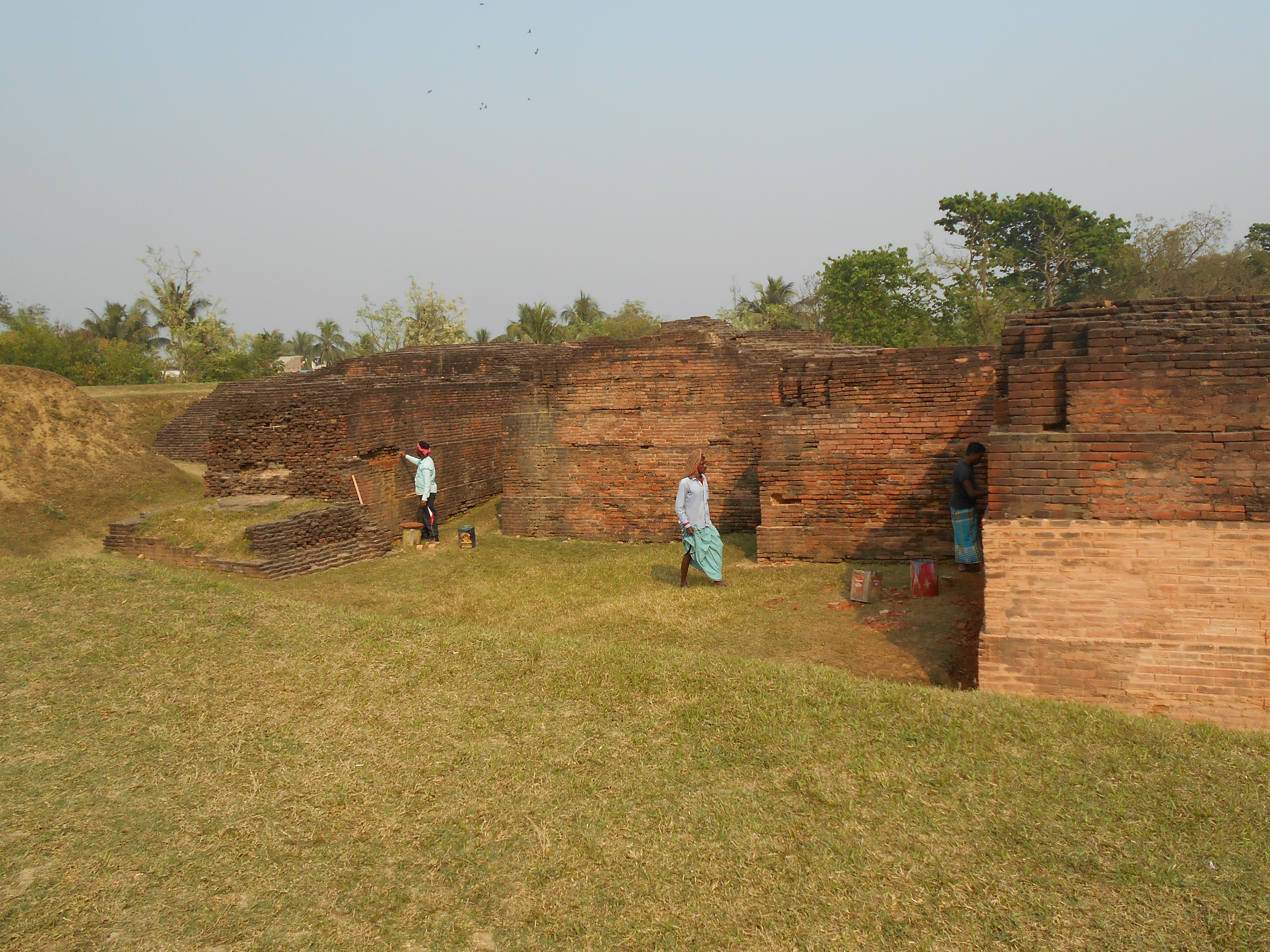
A part of the extensive structural complex

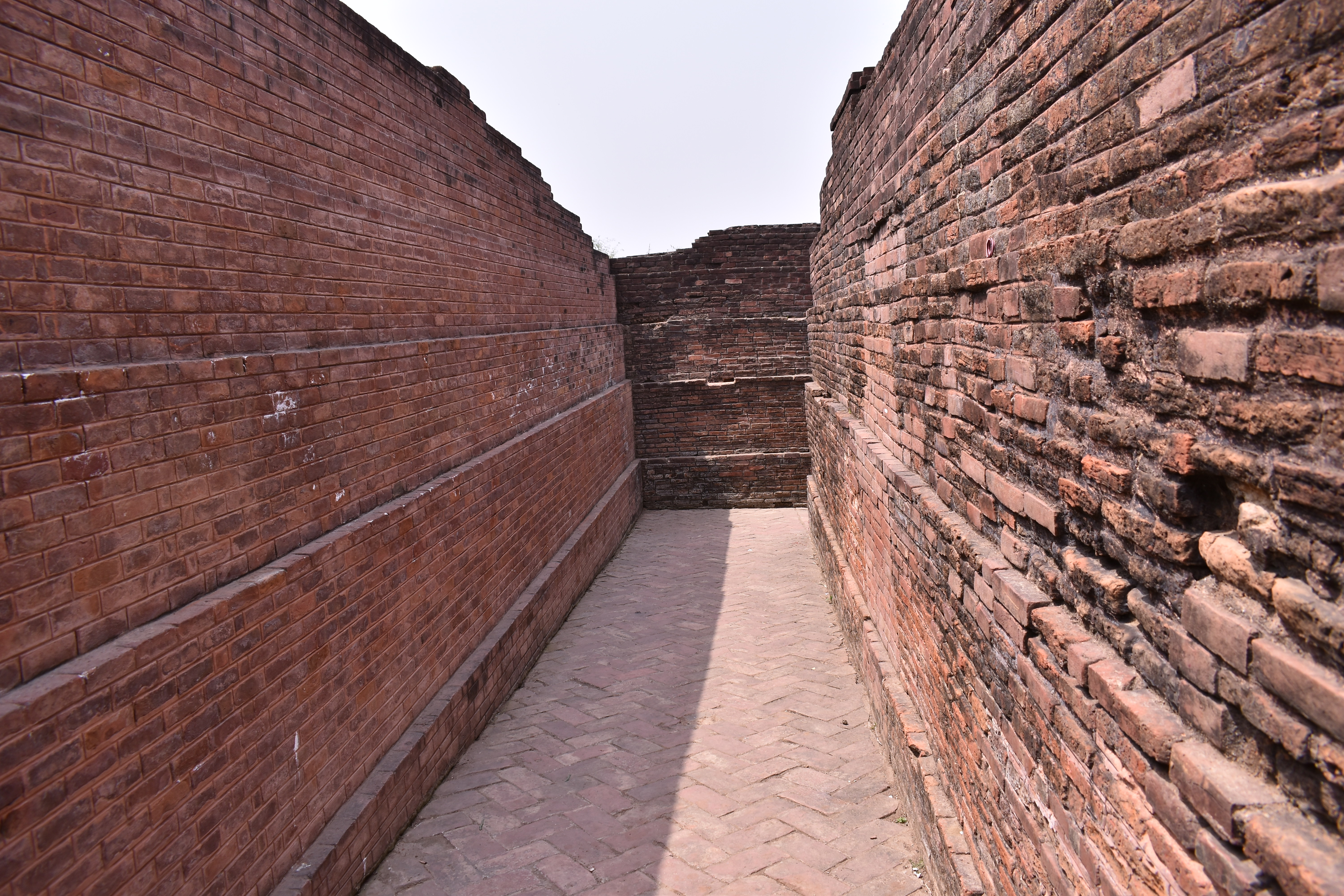
A narrow lane inside Ballal Dhipi complex

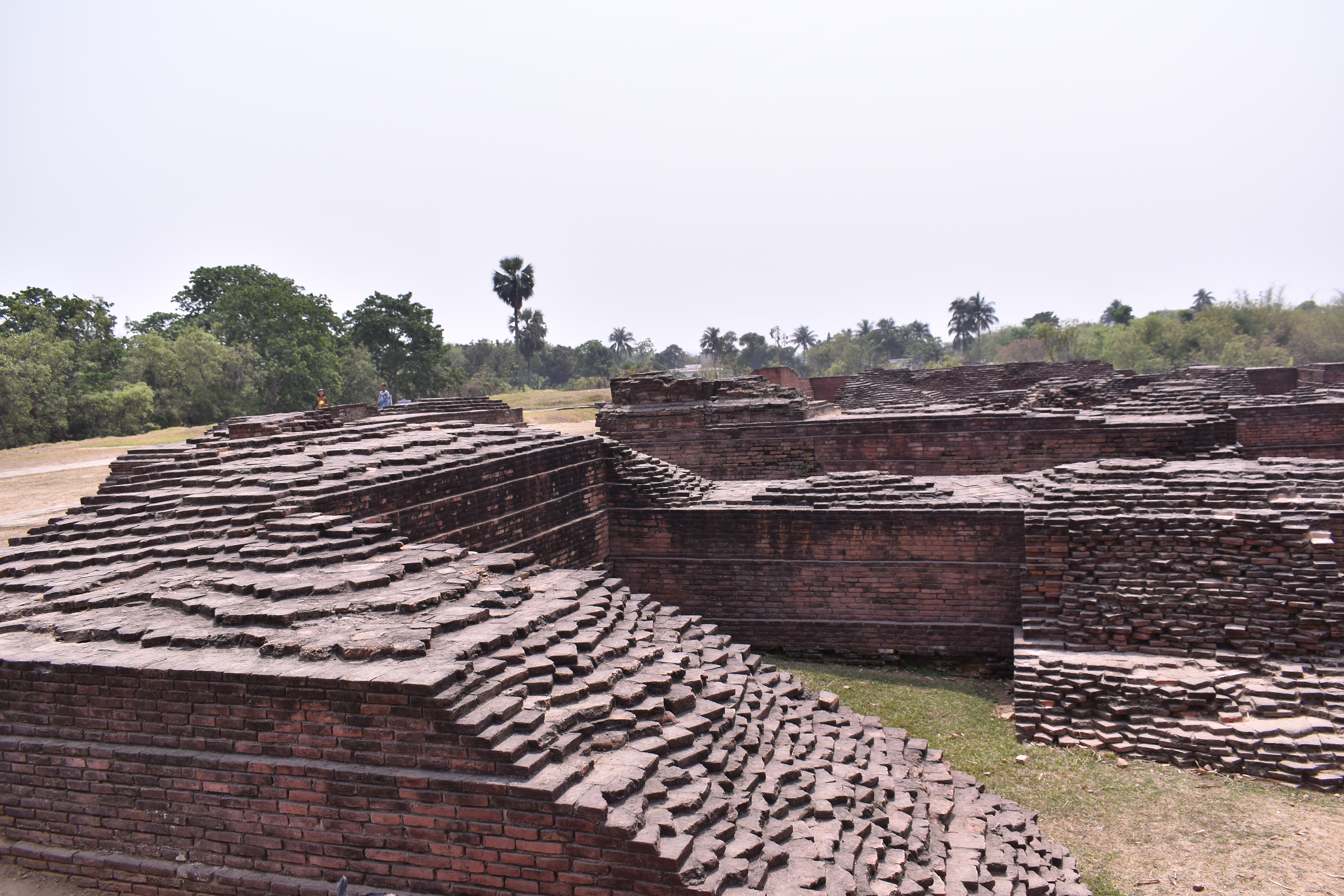
Partial views of Ballal Sen's Dhipi

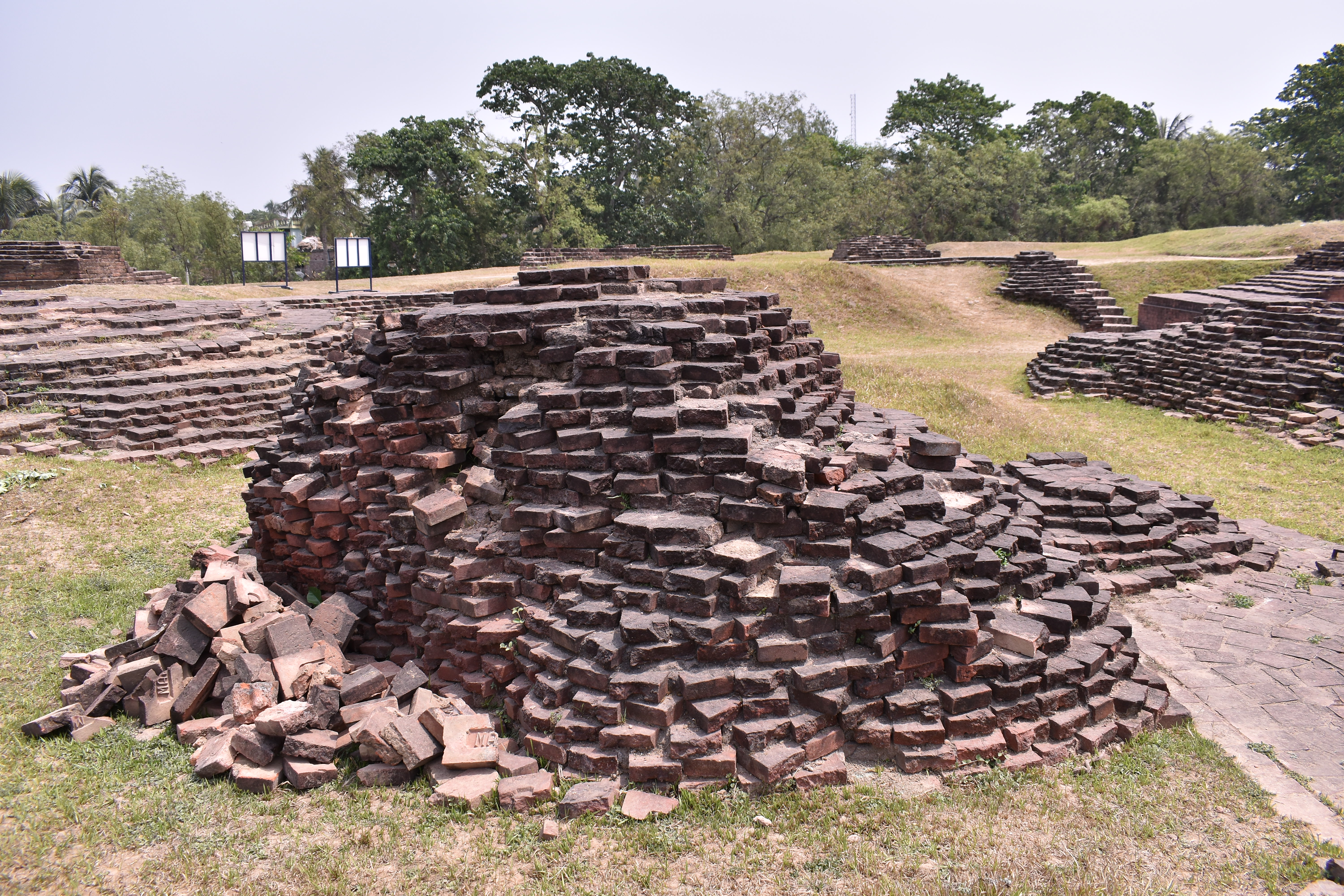
A ruined part of Ballal Sen's Dhipi

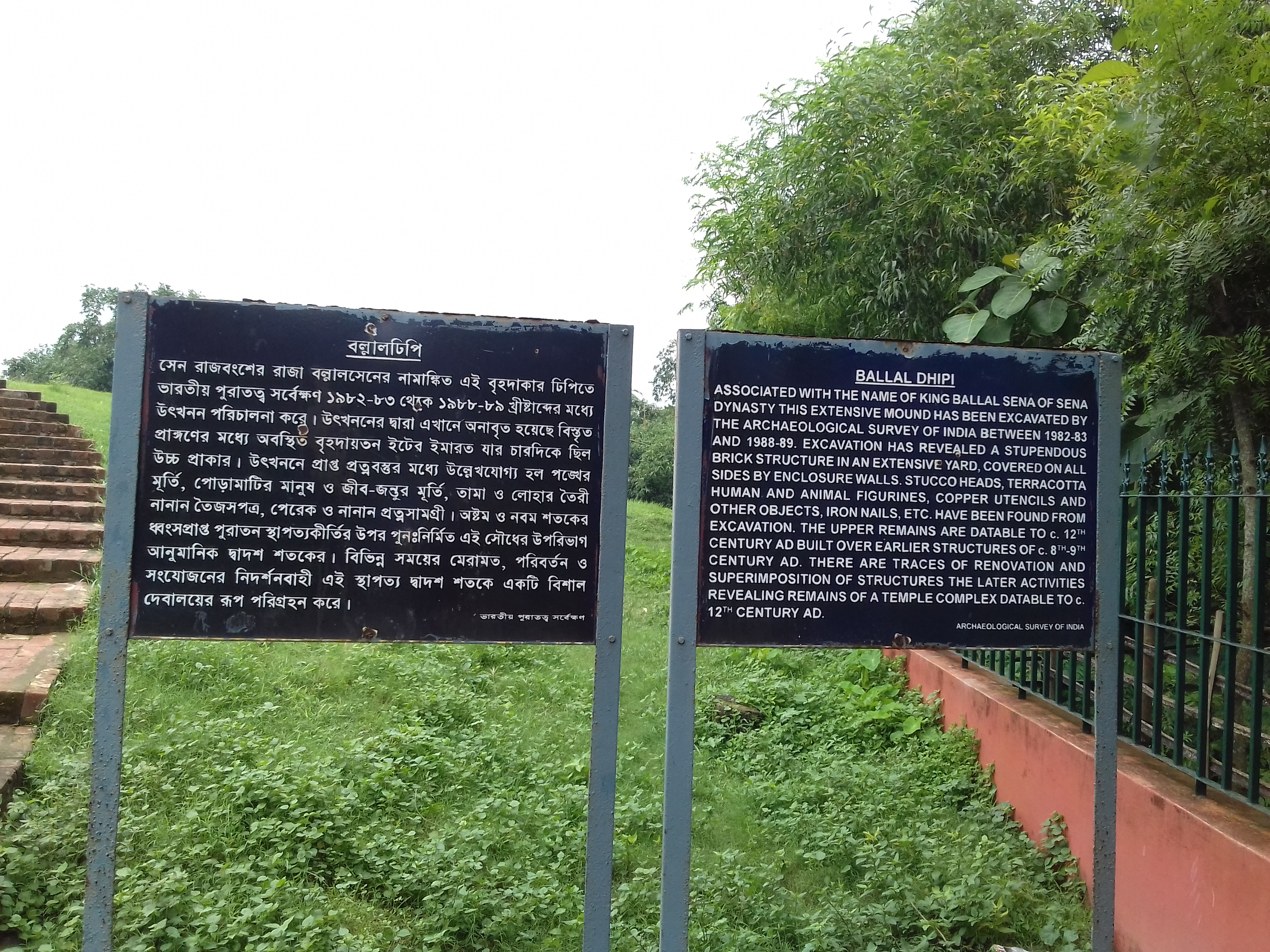
The information boards

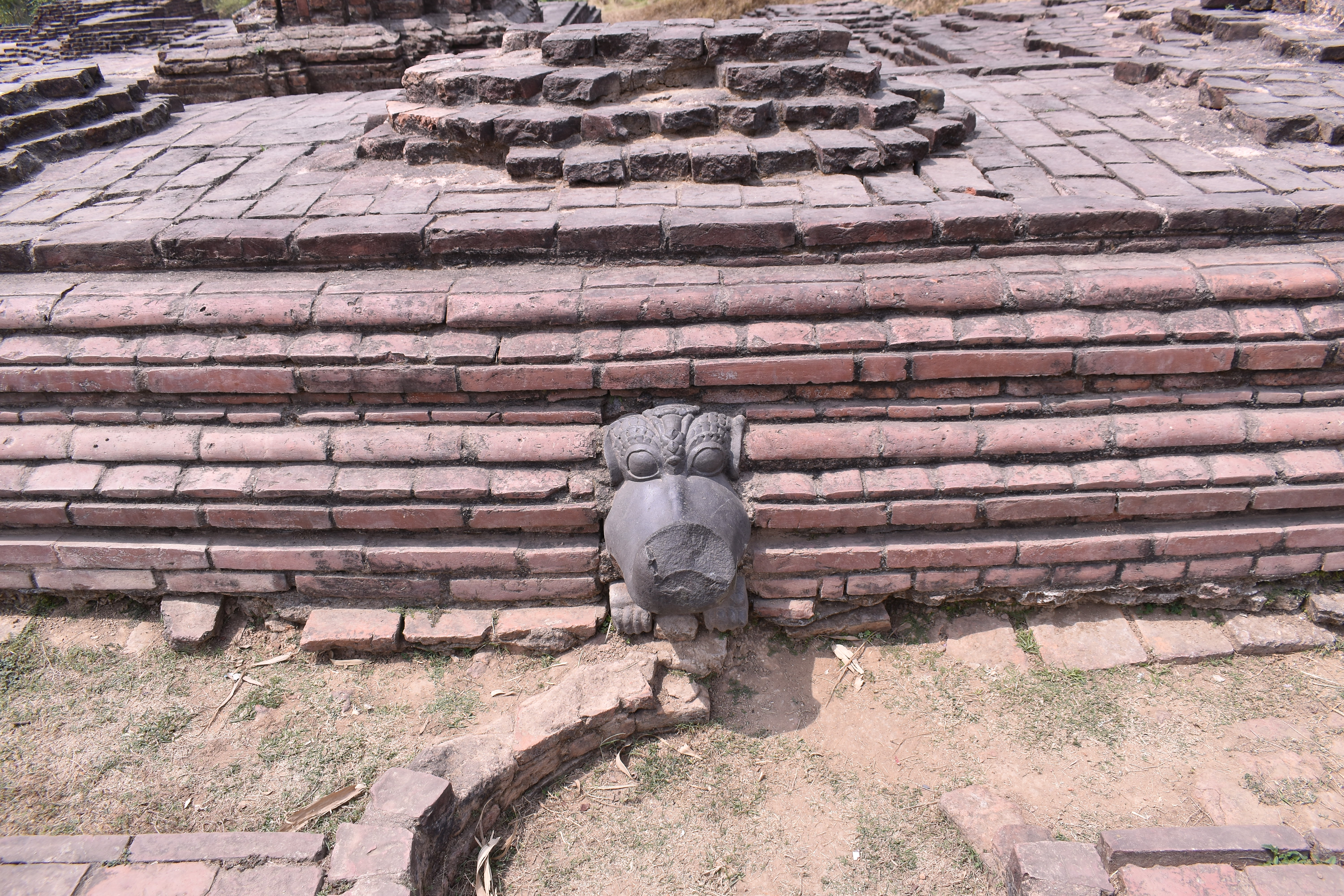
A crocodile head-shaped water outlet at Ballal Dhipi
