= Madhava Sena =

- King of Bengal
- Predecessor: Lakshmana Sena
- Successor: Vishvarupa Sena
- Dynasty: Sena Dynasty
- Father: Lakshmana Sena
- Religion: Hinduism

Madhava Sena was a Bengali ruler. He was the son of Lakshmana Sena in the Sena dynasty. After the death of Lakshmana Sena, Madhava Sena ascended the throne of Bengal. He was succeeded by his brother Vishvarup Sena.
