= Debalgarh =

Human settlement in West Bengal

- Location within West Bengal
- 23.1584422°N 88.6589176°E
- Type: Settlement
- Location: Debagram, West Bengal, India

Site notes
- Length: 1 kilometre (0.62 mi)
- Width: 1 kilometre (0.62 mi)
- Condition: Ruins
- Owner: Public
- Public access: Yes

Debalgarh is an archaeological site located at Debagram Anulia village in Nadia district of West Bengal, India. Post-Gupta, Pala, Sena and Sultanate period artefacts have been recovered from the archaeological site, which representing an estimated 1500 years of history of the settlement. Debalgarh is believed to have been a trading center during the Sena period; Artistic excellence is observed in the pottery of this period.

The archaeological site is spread over an area of 1 square kilometre (0.39 sq mi); the roughly square archeological site is both about 1 km long in length and width. The remains of a wide wall built of mud and bricks, which was 15 feet to 20 feet wide, are observed around this mean. On the outer side of the wall was a moat 40–50 meters wide and 8–10 feet deep, much of which has now disappeared.

Excavation work has not been conducted by any government agency here. However, black-red pottery, Jol pradīpa (A type of lamp), Buddhist and Vishnu idols have been discovered from the archaeological site.

== Location ==
Debalgarh is located in the Northern Hemisphere, 23.158 degrees north of the Equator. Located in Debagram in Nadia district, West Bengal on the Ganges delta about 75 kilometres (47 mi) from Kolkata.

Debalgarh is situated on the banks of the Hangor river, a branch of the Moralee river; at present the river is silted up and has become a bill or swamp called Nastar Bill. The archaeological site was located on the south bank of the river, and the connection with the Bhagirathi, a distributary of the Ganges, and the Ichamati, along with the river navigability, provided commercial potential.

== History ==
The first mention of Debalgarh archaeological site is found in the book List of Ancient Monuments in Bengal published in 1896. The book described Debalgarh as an archaeological site of the Pala-Sena period before the Muslim era. Apart from this, Debalgarh was mentioned in a Bengali newspaper Samachar Darpan in an article titled "চাকদহ থেকে আট ক্রোশ দূরে একটি ইটের ভগ্ন স্তুপ দেখা যায় "(in english: A broken mound of bricks is seen so far from Chakda).

=== Chronology ===
According to the sample obtained, the duration of Dealgarh has been divided into four Phases by The Asiatic Society. The first layer (Phase) belongs to the modern age, at this layer, a sign of British colonial rule has been found. The silver coins and remains of weapon were recovered in the second layer (Phase), indicating the Sultanate and the Mughal era. The third layer belonged to the Pala and Sena era, and at this layer pottery and Buddha statues were found. The lowest layer belongs to the beginning period early Middle Age. At this layer the archaeological materials of post-Gupta and Pala era have been discovered, such as metal Buddha idols and the Dharmachakra.

Stages	Dates	Events
Stage I	Modern age	British colonial rule
Stage II	1200–1750 AD	Sultanate and Mughal era
Stage III	Early Middle Age	Pala and Sena era
Stage IV	Early Middle Age	Post-Gupta and Pala

== Site ==
The archaeological site roughly consists of a moated fort, outer fort area and the river bed of Hangor river.

=== The fort ===
The fort was surrounded by a deep moat about 40 meters to 50 meters wide. Today, most of the moat has disappeared, but several sections are still 8 foot to 10 foot deep. The fort was protected by a rampart on the inside of the moat. The rampart (wall) was built of mud and bricks. The width of the rampart was from 15 feet to 20 feet. At the four corners of the fort were four earthen watchtowers. However, among the four watchtowers, the one in the north-west corner watchtower survives, the other three have been destroyed. The present height of the north-west corner watchtower is 60 feet and its foundation is spread over an area of 3 acres. It is estimated that the watchtowers were 150–200 feet high before erosion and destruction.

At the center of the fort is a large pond, known as Debala or Rajar pukur. The width of the pond is 420 feet from east to west and 380 feet from north to south. Three parallel walls, ghats and a series of vast chambers were discovered on the western bank of the pond, while excavation work was underway under the Mahatma Gandhi National Rural Employment Guarantee Act, 2005 (MGNREGA). The parallel walls are about 150 feet long and spaced 30 feet apart. A similar large structure was discovered on the south bank of the pond during agricultural land expansion in 2016. Presumably there was a palace centered around the pond.

=== Outer area of the fort ===
This part is located in the northern side of the moat. The part is covered by Debagram Reserve Forest. There are several mounds, situated on the banks of two water bodies known as Nal-pukur and Sagardighi. A mound lies between the Nal-pukur and the watchtower of the fort, which has a height of 10 feet to 12 feet and a length of 50 feet to 60 feet and a width of 40 feet to 50 feet. The possibility of well-planned urban remains beneath these mounds has been pointed out by Prof. Biswajit Roy. It is assumed that the settlement extended to the north-west. A pattern of alleyways can be observed within the settlement.

=== The river bed of Hangor river ===
An abandoned riverbed is observed on the north-east side of the fort, known as Nastar Bill. It was formerly known as the Hangor river, which is actually a branch of the Moralee river. Various artefacts have been recovered from this riverbed.

== Archaeology ==
The archaeological site has Debagram from medieval times in the form of ruins. This site is known to the villagers as the palace or residence of Debal Raja, and the villagers believe that the site has been abandoned since the death of Debal Raja. Ancient artefacts have been found from this place and its surrounding areas.

The Asiatic Society mentioned in the monthly bulletin published in July 2018, the presence of Debalgarh in the Pala era. Many artifacts have been recovered by the locals, which are preserved in the Debagram Museum. Professor Biswajit Roy identified the archaeological site as a fort. Anchor stones and gold and silver coins recovered at Debalgarh bear the indications of a trading centre. Besides, the anchor stones indicate the presence of naval-trade system and navigable waterways at Devalgarh.

== Artifacts ==
=== Pottery ===
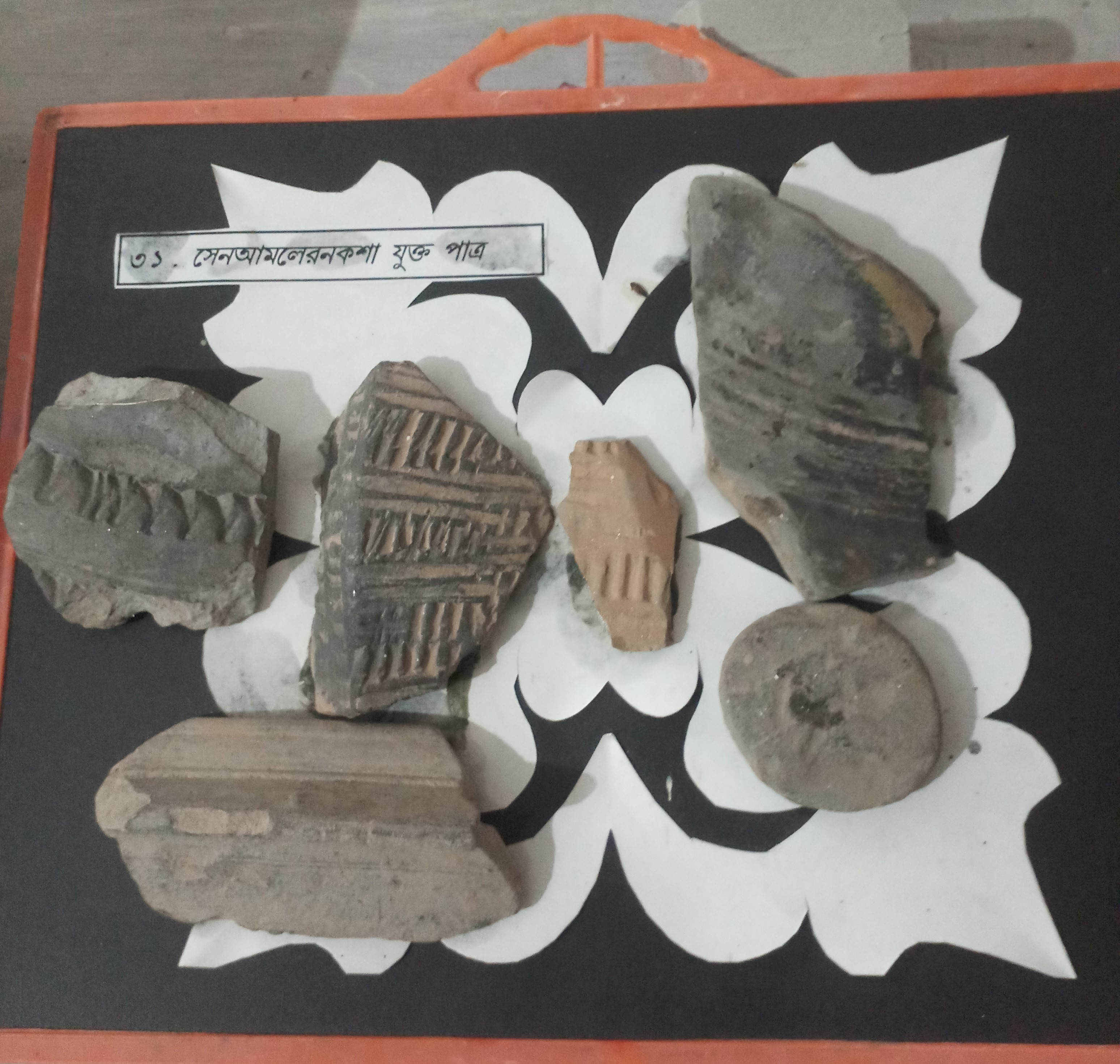
Engraved vessel fragments of Sena period recovered from Debalgarh.

Black colored smooth pottery has been found from Debalgarh; Some black colored pottery has been found, on which ornamentation is observed. Brightly colored pottery and narrow tubular pitchers from the Sultanate period have been discovered. All these artefacts indicate the advanced pottery of Debalgarh during the Sen and Sultanate periods. A decorative vase of the Pala period, with a female figure inscribed on the stem, was recovered. This decorative vase represents the advanced art of Bengal during the Pala period.

=== Anchor stone ===
3 cm perforated stone block were recovered from the Khirki pond and the moat at Debalgarh. Professor Biswajit Roy, referred to these stone blocks as anchor stone of ships or vessels. He also mentioned that such stone blocks were also discovered from Harinarayanpur and Tilpi archaeological sites, which were used for anchoring.

=== Seals and coins ===
The terracotta seals found in the archaeological site are circular and inscribed with the image of a lotus flower, the lotus having eight petals. Gold coins of the Gupta period and silver coins of the Sultanate period have been found. The silver coin is identified as a coin of the Sultanate era by the inscribed lettering on both sides.

=== Decorated bricks and other patterns ===
Large and medium sized bricks were found. Large bricks are 18 inches long, 12 inches wide and 2-2.5 inches thick (18 inches x 12 inches x 2-2.5 inches) and on the other hand medium sized bricks are 11 inches long, 7-8 inches wide and 1-1.5 inches thick (11 inches x 7-8 inches x 1-1.5 inches). Besides, decorative bricks with foliage carved and some decorated panels were found. Various sizes of terracotta ornaments and semi-precious stone beads, pottery with fishtail handles and terracotta animal replicas have been found.

Also some large size stone blocks have been recovered from different places of Debagram. The ornamentation inscribed on these large stone blocks suggests that they were used as architectural materials.

== Bibliography ==
- Roy, Biswajit (September 2021). দেবলগড় আনুলিয়া প্রত্নক্ষেত্র: হারানো এক রাজধানীর সন্ধানে (in Bengali) (1st ed.). Alipurduar, West Bengal: Beyond Horizon Publication. ISBN 978-81-952883-3-5.
- Basu, Durga, ed. (26 June 2021). "Journal of Heritage, Archaeology & Management (JHAM)". Journal of Heritage, Archaeology & Management. 1 (1). Kolkata, West Bengal: Society For Heritage, Archaeology & Management. ISSN 2583-4126.
