= Kulinism =

Caste system in medieval Bengal

- কৌলিন্য কুলিন প্রথা
- Type: Social stratification Religious practice
- Classification: Indian caste system
- Scripture: Kulagrantha/Kulapanjikā
- Associations: Hinduism
- Territory: Bengal
- Founder: Ballala Sena
- Origin: c. 1158–69; Sena Empire

Kulinism (Bengali: কৌলিন্য) or Kulin Pratha is a practice that envisages an elite position within the varna/jati configuration, derived from spiritual and ritual purity. Upper castes in Bengal were divided into exogamous classes, with ritual status determined by lineage purity and family marital history, with Kulins having the highest status. The Kulagranthas or Kulapanjikas (Genealogical literatures) are the foundational narrative of Kulinism in Bengal, detailing its development over centuries and focusing on kulina lineages and social interaction norms. The Kulapanjikas state that King Ballal Sena initiated Kulinism, which conferred titles of nobility upon the Brahmanas, Kayasthas, and Vaidyas in Bengal. According to texts, King Adisura invited Brahmins (accompanied by Kayasthas) to settle in the region from Kanauj and designated them higher in social status. The texts further state that King Ballal Sena introduced Kulinism, designating certain lineages of Brahmins and Kayasthas with higher social status due to superior virtues and practices; This system further extended to Baidya jatis, not associated with Kanauj migration. It appears to have started among the Baidyas with attributes like riches, education, good actions, etc., which were standardised by Samajapatis, Kulapanjikaras, and Ghatakus (professional matchmakers who served as the stewards of particular communities' family customs), as suggested by Sircar. Lakshmana Sena, the son and heir of Ballala Sena, is said to have made additional changes and controls to the establishment of Kulinism. The accounts of Kulpanjis in connection to Kulinism are viewed with suspicion and have largely been accepted as unhistorical by scholars.

Bangaon Copper plate reveals the early social history of Bengal and Kulinism, with King Vigrahapala III granting land to Ghantuka Sarman, a Sandilya gotra Brahmin living in Ituhaka. Maithili Brahmin Ghantisa had previously owned the land and gave it to Kolancha Brahmin due to a distant relationship. According to Bagchi, this trend of claiming connections to Western Brahmin scholars led to the creation of Kulaji texts, genealogical literature as Brahmins sought to prove their prestige by proving their originality and purity. According to D.C. Sircar, it may have been Mithila immigrants who partially brought the Kulinism institution to Bengal.

Periodic evaluations of jati/kula rankings among dominant Bengali jatis continued by post-Sena potentates until the 19th century, influenced by Kulinism and its modifications.
