= Ghatak =

Ghatak may refer to:

- Ghatak (surname), including a list of people with the name
- Ghatak: Lethal, a 1996 Indian Hindi-language film, starring Sunny Deol
- Ghatak Force, special-operations infantry platoons in the Indian Army
- Ghatak, in Hindu mythology, the last chief of the Danava dynasty before the advent of the Naraka dynasty
- DRDO Ghatak, an unmanned combat aircraft under development by the Indian military
