= Ghurid conquest of Bengal =

Indian campaign of Muhammad of Ghor (1202–1205)

- Part of Ghurid campaigns in India
Date	1202–1205 (disputed)
Location	Nabadwip and Varendra
Result	Ghurid victory
Territorial changes	Annexation of Lakhnauti by the Ghurid Dynasty

Belligerents
Ghurid dynasty	Sena Dynasty

Commanders and leaders
Muhammad Bakhtiyar Khalji	Lakshmana Sena

Strength
19 cavalry	Unknown

The Ghurid conquest of Bengal, commonly known as Muhammad Bakhtiyar Khalji's conquest of Bengal, in 1202/3 or 1204/5, (Note: The date is varied upon sources. 1202 AD 1203 AD 1204 AD 1205 AD) was a military campaign of Ghurid dynasty led by Muhammad Bakhtiyar Khalji against the Sena dynasty. Muhammad Bakhtiyar Khalji emerged victorious in his campaign at the Sena capital, Nabadwip. He established his kingdom at Lakhnauti which included a small part of Varendra. Following their defeat, Lakshmana Sena, the eighty years old ruler of the Sena dynasty, retreated to the southeastern region of Bengal.

== Background ==
Bakhtiyar Khalji, after the successful annexation of Bihar to the Ghurid dynasty, learned about the Sena Dynasty and its illustrious ruler, Lakshmana Sena. Despite Sena's advanced age and reputation, Khalji was determined to extend his conquests further into Bengal. Upon hearing of Khalji's intent to invade Bengal, many Brahmins and traders decided to leave the Sena capital in search of safer locations. However, in a display of resilience, Lakshmana Sena chose to remain in Nadiya, ready to defend his realm.

== The siege ==
Bakhtiyar, leading his forces from Bihar, strategically positioned the majority of his army within a forest near the city of Nadia (Note: Nadiya, a city that is now identified with the village of Naoda, a village several miles northeast of Rohanpur railway station in western Rajshahi District (and not to be confused with the city of Nadia in West Bengal)) (in Rajshahi). It was said that he advanced so rapidly that only 18 horsemen from his army could keep up. Posing as horse traders, the small horde entered the city unchallenged and cautiously towards the palace. Upon reaching the palace, Bakhtiyar initiated an attack on the guards, causing a significant commotion. Then Lakshmana Sena was taking his mid day meal. He took the emperor and his army by shock. Before Lakshmana Sena could react, Bakhtiyar entered the palace, killed some of the guards causing Lakshmana Sena to flee with his retainers to East Bengal leaving his wives and servants on the hand of Bakhtiyar's army. As Bakhtiyar took the possession of the city, his men seized several horses and elephants along with enormous wealth. In the meantime, the main army had entered Bengal. However, Bakhtiyar didn't subjugate the whole of Bengal. He then moved on to Lakhnauti, which he planned to make his capital.

== Aftermath ==
Bakhtiyar Khilji left Nadia in ruins and established his capital at Lakhnauti. Lakshmana Sena continued to rule in Eastern Bengal approximately for three or four years after the raid on Nadia and died some time after 1205 A.D. According to the historical work Tabaqat-i Nasiri, Bang (Vanga or Eastern and Southern Bengal) was ruled by the descendants of Lakshmana Sena at least up to 1245 A.D. or 1260 A.D.

In the year 1204-5 (601 A.H.), Bakhtiyar Khalji struck a gold coin in the name of his overlord in Delhi, sultan Muhammad of Ghor, with one side depicting a cavalryman charging at full gallop and holding a mace in hand. The coin bears the conquest of Gaur. In 1205, Bakhtiyar Khalji was killed by one of his nobles, Ali Mardan Khalji. During the reign of Ali Mardan Khalji, who declared his independence from Delhi Sultanate, silver coins were struck, commemorating the conquest of Bengal in Ramzan 600 A.H. (May 1204 A.D.)

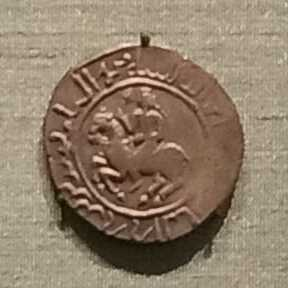
Coin issued by Bakhtiyar Khalji reads "Gauda vijaye", "On the conquest of Gaur" inscribed in Sanskrit.

== Bibliography ==
- Sarkar, Jadunath (1943). The History of Bengal. Vol. II. University of Dacca.
- Majumdar, Ramesh Chandra (1971). History of Ancient Bengal. G.Bharadwaj.
- Eaton, Richard M. (1993). The Rise of Islam and the Bengal Frontier, 1204-1760. University of California Press. ISBN 978-0-520-20507-9.
- Mahajan, V.D. (2007). History of Medieval India. S. Chand Publishing. ISBN 978-81-219-0364-6.
- Hasan, Perween (2007). Sultans and Mosques: The Early Muslim Architecture of Bangladesh. Bloomsbury Academic. ISBN 978-1-84511-381-0.
- Siddiq, Mohammad Yusuf (2015). Epigraphy and Islamic Culture: Inscriptions of the Early Muslim Rulers of Bengal (1205-1494). Taylor & Francis. ISBN 978-1-317-58745-3.
- Bhattacharya, Sabyasachi (2020). A Comprehensive History of Modern Bengal, 1700-1950. Asiatic Society. ISBN 978-93-89901-95-5.
- Sen, Sailendra Nath (1999). Ancient Indian History and Civilization. New Age International. ISBN 978-81-224-1198-0.
- Sengupta, Nitish (2011). Land Of Two Rivers : A History of Bengal from the Mahabharata to Mujib. Penguin Books India. ISBN 978-0-14-341678-4.
- Chandra, Satish (2004). Medieval India: From Sultanat to the Mughals-Delhi Sultanat (1206-1526) - Part One. Har-Anand Publications. ISBN 978-81-241-1064-5.
- Salma, Ahmed Farooqui (2011). A Comprehensive History of Medieval India : Twelfth to the Mid-eighteenth Century. Pearson Education India. ISBN 978-81-317-3202-1.
- Mehta, Jaswant Lal (1979). Advanced Study in the History of Medieval India. Sterling Publishers Pvt. Ltd. ISBN 978-81-207-0617-0.
- Haig, W. (1928). The Cambridge History of India: Turks and Afghans, edited by W. Haig. Vol. III. Cambridge University Press.
- Khan, Muhammad Mojlum (2013). The Muslim Heritage of Bengal: The Lives, Thoughts and Achievements of Great Muslim Scholars, Writers and Reformers of Bangladesh and West Bengal. Kube Publishing Limited. ISBN 978-1-84774-052-6.
- Ahmed, Abu Sayeed M. (2006). Mosque Architecture in Bangladesh. UNESCO Dhaka. ISBN 978-984-32-3469-8.
