= Calendar era =

Date system of time since an epoch event

2026 in various calendars
- Gregorian calendar: 2026; MMXXVI
- Ab urbe condita: 2779
- Armenian calendar: 1475; ԹՎ ՌՆՀԵ
- Assyrian calendar: 6776
- Baháʼí calendar: 182–183
- Balinese saka calendar: 1947–1948
- Bengali calendar: 1432–1433
- Berber calendar: 2976
- British Regnal year: 4 Cha. 3 – 5 Cha. 3
- Buddhist calendar: 2570
- Burmese calendar: 1388
- Byzantine calendar: 7534–7535
- Chinese calendar: 乙巳年 (Wood Snake); 4723 or 4516 — to — 丙午年 (Fire Horse); 4724 or 4517
- Coptic calendar: 1742–1743
- Discordian calendar: 3192
- Ethiopian calendar: 2018–2019
- Hebrew calendar: 5786–5787
- Hindu calendars
- Vikram Samvat: 2082–2083
- Shaka Samvat: 1947–1948
- Kali Yuga: 5126–5127
- Holocene calendar: 12026
- Igbo calendar: 1026–1027
- Iranian calendar: 1404–1405
- Islamic calendar: 1447–1448
- Japanese calendar: Reiwa 8 (令和８年)
- Javanese calendar: 1959–1960
- Juche calendar: 115
- Julian calendar: Gregorian minus 13 days
- Korean calendar: 4359
- Minguo calendar: ROC 115 民國115年
- Nanakshahi calendar: 558
- Thai solar calendar: 2569
- Tibetan calendar: ཤིང་མོ་སྦྲུལ་ལོ་ (female Wood-Snake); 2152 or 1771 or 999 — to — མེ་ཕོ་རྟ་ལོ་ (male Fire-Horse); 2153 or 1772 or 1000
- Unix time: 1767225600 – 1798761599

Today (at UTC+00)
- Wednesday, 12 August 2026
Other calendars
Armenian	23 Nawasardi 1476
Bengali	28 Shrabon, BS 1433
Chinese	Yang Earth Horse・Three Stars Mansion; 0 Qīyuè, Bǐngwǔnián (Liqiu, 11 days until Chushu)
Common Era	12 August 2026 CE
Coptic	6 Mesori, AM 1742
Egyptian	28 Choiak, NE 2775
Ethiopian	6 Naḥasē, AD 2018
French Republican	Décade III, Quintidi de Thermidor de l'Année 234 de la République
Gregorian	12 August, AD 2026
Hebrew	29 Av, AM 5786
Islamic	27 Safar, AH 1448 (tabular method)
ISO week date	2026-W33-3
Japanese	30 Minazuki, Reiwa 8 (Risshū, 11 days until Shosho)
Julian	30 July, AD 2026 (AM 7534)
Julian day	2461265
Maya	13.0.13.15.2; 15 Yaxkin, 7 Ik
Roman	ante diem III Kalendas Augustas, AUC 2779
Solar Hijri	21 Mordad, SH 1405

A calendar era is the period of time elapsed since one epoch of a calendar and, if it exists, before the next one. For example, the current year is numbered 2026 in the Gregorian calendar, which numbers its years in the Western Christian era (the Coptic Orthodox and Ethiopian Orthodox churches have their own Christian eras).

In antiquity, regnal years were counted from the accession of a monarch. This makes the chronology of the ancient Near East very difficult to reconstruct, based on disparate and scattered king lists, such as the Sumerian King List and the Babylonian Canon of Kings. In East Asia, reckoning by era names chosen by ruling monarchs ceased in the 20th century except for Japan, where they are still used.

== Ancient dating systems ==
=== Assyrian eponyms ===
For over a thousand years, ancient Assyria used a system of eponyms to identify each year. Each year at the Akitu festival (celebrating the Mesopotamian new year), one of a small group of high officials (including the king in later periods) would be chosen by lot to serve as the limmu for the year, which meant that he would preside over the Akitu festival and the year would bear his name. The earliest attested limmu eponyms are from the Assyrian trading colony at Karum Kanesh in Anatolia, dating to the very beginning of the 2nd millennium BC, and they continued in use until the end of the Neo-Assyrian Period, c. 612 BC.

Assyrian scribes compiled limmu lists, including an unbroken sequence of almost 250 eponyms from the early 1st millennium BC. This is an invaluable chronological aid, because a solar eclipse was recorded as having taken place in the limmu of Bur-Sagale, governor of Guzana. Astronomers have identified this eclipse as one that took place on 15 June 763 BC, which has allowed absolute dates of 892 to 648 BC to be assigned to that sequence of eponyms. This list of absolute dates has allowed many of the events of the Neo-Assyrian Period to be dated to a specific year, avoiding the chronological debates that characterize earlier periods of Mesopotamian history.

=== Olympiad dating ===
Among the ancient Greek historians and scholars, a common method of indicating the passage of years was based on the Olympic Games, first held in 776 BC. The Olympic Games provided the various independent city-states with a mutually recognizable system of dates. Olympiad dating was not used in everyday life. This system was in use from the 3rd century BC. The modern Olympic Games (or Summer Olympic Games beginning 1896) do not continue the four year periods from ancient Greece: the 669th Olympiad would have begun in the summer of 1897, but the modern Olympics were first held in 1896.

=== Indiction cycles ===
The indiction cycle was an agricultural tax cycle implemented in Roman Egypt. 15 indictions made up the cycle, an indiction being a year in duration. Documents and events began to be dated by the year of the cycle (e.g., "fifth indiction", "tenth indiction") in the 4th century, and this system was used long after the tax ceased to be collected. It was used in Gaul, in Egypt until the Islamic conquest, and in the Eastern Roman Empire until its conquest in 1453.

A useful chart providing all the equivalents can be found in Chaîne's book on chronology, and can easily be consulted online at the Internet Archive, from page 134 to page 172.

A rule for computing the indiction from an AD year number was stated by Dionysius Exiguus: add 3 and divide by 15; the remainder is the indiction, with 0 understood to be the fifteenth indiction. Thus the indiction of 2001 was 9. The beginning of the year for the indiction varied.

=== Seleucid era ===
The Seleucid era was used in much of the Middle East from the 4th century BC to the 6th century AD, and continued until the 10th century AD among Oriental Christians. The era is computed from the epoch 312 BC: in August of that year Seleucus I Nicator captured Babylon and began his reign over the Asian portions of Alexander the Great's empire. Thus depending on whether the calendar year is taken as starting on 1 Tishri or on 1 Nisan (respectively the start of the Jewish civil and ecclesiastical years) the Seleucid era begins either in 311 BC (the Jewish reckoning) or in 312 BC (the Greek reckoning: October–September).

=== Ancient Rome ===
==== Consular dating ====
An early and common practice was Roman 'consular' dating. This involved naming both consules ordinarii who had taken up this office on 1 January (since 153 BC) of the relevant civil year. Sometimes one or both consuls might not be appointed until November or December of the previous year, and news of the appointment may not have reached parts of the Roman empire for several months into the current year; thus we find the occasional inscription where the year is defined as "after the consulate" of a pair of consuls.

The use of consular dating ended in AD 541 when the emperor Justinian I discontinued appointing consuls. The last consul nominated was Anicius Faustus Albinus Basilius. Soon afterwards, imperial regnal dating was adopted in its place.

==== Dating from the founding of Rome ====
Another method of dating was ab urbe condita (Latin for "from the founding of the city" of Rome) or anno urbis conditae (Latin for "in the year of the founding of the city"), both abbreviated AUC.

Several epochs for this date were in use by Roman historians, all based on the incomplete surviving list of Roman consuls and the myths of the city's founding by Romulus and Remus. The chronology established by Marcus Terentius Varro in the 1st century BC intercalated several years of dictatorships, a period of anarchy, and a standardized length of reign for all of Rome's former kings to arrive at a year running from 754–753 BC, taken as equivalent to the 3rd year of the 6th Olympiad. Because the Parilia had become associated with the founding of the city by his time, he took the specific date to have been 21 April 753 BC. This became the official chronology of the empire by at least the time of Claudius, who held Secular Games in AD 47 to celebrate the city's 800th anniversary. The 900th and 1000th anniversaries were then celebrated in 148 under Antoninus Pius and in 248 under Philip I.

The AUC era was seldom used in the traditional Roman or early Julian calendars. Naming each year by its two consuls or by the emperor's regnal years predominated, with Hadrian's aurei and sestertii marking the Romaea in AUC 874 (ann dccclxxiiii nat vrb) a notable exception. AUC dating became more common in late antiquity, appearing in Censorinus, Orosius, and others. During the early Middle Ages, some church officials like Boniface IV employed AUC and AD dating together.

Historical Roman dating employed several different dates for the beginning of the year. Modern application of the AUC era generally ignores this, the known mistakes in Varro's own calculations, and the 752 BC epoch used by the Fasti and later Secular Games, such that AD 2026 is generally considered equivalent to AUC 2779 (2026 + 753).

==== Regnal years of Roman emperors ====
Another system that is less commonly found than might be thought was the use of the regnal year of the Roman emperor. At first, Augustus indicated the year of his reign by counting how many times he had held the office of consul, and how many times the Roman Senate had granted him the power of a tribune (Latin: tribunicia potestas, abbr. TRP), carefully observing the fiction that his powers came from these offices granted to him, rather than from his own person or the many legions under his control. His successors followed his practice until the memory of the Roman Republic faded (about AD 200), when they began to use their regnal year openly.

==== Dating from the Roman conquest ====
Some regions of the Roman Empire dated their calendars from the date of Roman conquest, or the establishment of Roman rule.

The Spanish era, or the Era of Caesar, counted the years from 38 BC and, although the exact reasons for this are unknown, it is usually attributed to either the levy of a general tax from the known world by Octavian or the end of the roman conquest of the peninsula during the civil war of the Second Triumvirate. Either way the date traditionally marks the establishment of Roman rule in Spain and was used in official documents by the Suebian and Visigothic kingdoms and later in Portugal, Aragon, Valencia, Castile, and southern France. This system of calibrating years fell to disuse in the Early Modern Age and was replaced by today's Anno Domini. The months and years are the same as the Julian Calendar.

Throughout the Roman and Byzantine periods, the Decapolis and other Hellenized cities of Syria and Judea (aka Palestine, the colonial designation of the holy land by the Roman destroyers of Judea) used the Pompeian era, counting dates from the Roman general Pompey's conquest of the region in 63 BC.

=== Maya ===
A different form of Maya calendar was used to track longer periods of time, and for the inscription of calendar dates (i.e., identifying when one event occurred in relation to others). This form, known as the Long Count, is based upon the number of elapsed days since a mythological starting-point. According to the calibration between the Long Count and Western calendars accepted by the great majority of Maya researchers (known as the GMT correlation), this starting-point is equivalent to 11 August, 3114 BC in the proleptic Gregorian calendar or 6 September in the Julian calendar (−3113 astronomical).

=== Other dating systems ===
A great many local systems or eras were also important, for example the year from the foundation of one particular city, the regnal year of the neighboring Persian emperor, and eventually even the year of the reigning Caliph.

== Late Antiquity and Middle Ages ==
Most of the traditional calendar eras in use today were introduced at the time of transition from Late Antiquity to the Early Middle Ages, roughly between the 6th and 10th centuries.

=== Christian era ===
- The Etos Kosmou of the Byzantine Calendar commences with the creation of the world portrayed in Genesis, the date of which- arrived at by the monk Giorgios- being 1 September, 5509 BC. Its first known use occurred in the 7th century AD, although its precursors were developed about AD 400.
- The Era of Martyrs or Era of Diocletian is reckoned from the beginning of the reign of Roman Emperor Diocletian; the first year of this era was 284/5. It was not the custom to use regnal years in Rome, but it was the custom in Roman Egypt, which the emperor ruled through a prefect (the king of Egypt). The year number changed on the first day of the Egyptian month Thoth (29 August three years out of four, 30 August the year before a Roman leap year.) Diocletian abolished the special status of Egypt, which thereafter followed the normal Roman calendar: consular years beginning on 1 January. This era was used in the Easter tables prepared in Alexandria long after the abdication of Diocletian, even though Diocletian was a notorious persecutor of Christians. The Era of Diocletian was retained by the Coptic Church and used for general purposes, but by 643 the name had been changed to Era of the Martyrs.
- The Incarnation Era is used by Ethiopia. Its epoch is 29 August, AD 8 in the Julian calendar.
- The Armenian calendar has its epoch fixed at AD 552.

==== Dionysian "Common Era" ====
The era based on the Incarnation of Christ was introduced by Dionysius Exiguus in 525 and is in continued use with various reforms and derivations. The distinction between the Incarnation occurring with the conception or the Nativity of Jesus was not drawn until the late ninth century. The first day of the numbered year varied from place to place and depended on the calendar in use: when, in 1600, Scotland adopted 1 January as the first day of the year, this was already the case in much of continental Europe. England adopted this practice in 1752.

- A.D. (or AD) – for the Latin Anno Domini, meaning "in the year of (our) Lord". This is the dominant or Western Christian Era; AD is used in the Gregorian calendar. Anno Salutis, meaning "in the year of salvation" is identical. Originally intended to number years from the Incarnation of Jesus, according to modern thinking the calculation was a few years off. Years preceding AD 1 are numbered using the BC era, avoiding zero or negative numbers. AD was also used in the Christianized Julian calendar, but the first day of the year was either 1 March, Easter, 25 March (Feast of the Annunciation), 1 September, or 25 December (Feast of the Nativity), not 1 January. To distinguish between the Julian and Gregorian calendars, O.S. and N.S. were often added to the date, especially during the 17th and 18th centuries, when both calendars were in common use. Old Style (O.S.) was used for the Julian calendar and for years not beginning on 1 January. New Style (N.S.) was used for the Gregorian calendar and for Julian calendar years beginning on 1 January. Many countries switched to using 1 January as the start of the numbered year at the same time as they switched from the Julian calendar to the Gregorian calendar, but others switched earlier or later.
- B.C. (or BC) – meaning "Before Christ". Used for years before AD 1, counting backwards so the year n BC is n years before AD 1. Thus there is no year 0.
- C.E. (or CE) and B.C.E. (or BCE) – meaning "Common Era" and "Before the Common Era", numerically equivalent to AD and BC, respectively (in writing, "AD" precedes the year number, but "CE" follows the year: AD 1 = 1 CE.) The Latin equivalent vulgaris aera was used as early as 1615 by Johannes Kepler. The English abbreviations C.E. and B.C.E. were introduced in the 19th century by Jewish intellectuals, wishing to avoid the abbreviation for dominus "lord" in implicit reference to Christ. By the later 20th century, the abbreviations had come into wider usage by authors who wished to emphasize secularism.

===== Dionysian-derived =====
- Astronomical year numbering situates its year 0 with 1 BC, and counts negative years from 2 BC backward (−1 backward), so 100 BC is −99.
- The human era, also named Holocene era, proposed by Cesare Emiliani adds 10,000 to AD years, so that AD 1 would be the year 10,001.
- Anno Lucis of Freemasonry adds 4000 years to the AD year.

=== Islamic ===
- A.H. (or AH) for the Latinized Anno Hegirae, meaning "in the year of the Hijra", Muhammad's emigration from Mecca to Medina in September 622, which occurred in its first year, is used in the Islamic calendar. Since the Islamic calendar is a purely lunar calendar of about 354 or 355 days, its year count increases faster than that of solar and lunisolar calendars.
- S.H. (or SH) is used by the Iranian calendar to denote the number of solar years since the Hijra. The year beginning at the vernal equinox equals the number of the Gregorian year beginning at the preceding 1 January minus 621.

=== Hindu ===
- Hindu calendar, counting from the start of the Kali Yuga, with its epoch on 18 February, 3102 BC Julian (23 January, 3102 BC Gregorian), based on Aryabhata (6th century).
- Vikrama Samvat, 56-57 BC, introduced about the 12th century.
- S.E. or (SE) – for the Saka Era, used in some Hindu calendars and in the Indian national calendar, with an epoch near the vernal equinox of year 78 (its year 0); its usage spread to Southeast Asia before year 1000. This era is also used (together with the Gregorian calendar) in the Indian national calendar, the official civil calendar used in communiques issued by the Government of India.
- Lakshmana Era, established by the Bengali ruler Lakshmana Sena with an epoch of 1118–1119. It was used for at least 400 years in Bihar and Bengal.

=== Southeast Asia ===
The Hindu Saka Era influences the calendars of southeast Asian indianized kingdoms.

- B.E. – for the Buddhist Era, introduced by Vajiravudh in 1912, which has an epoch (origin) of 544 BC. This year is called year 1 in Sri Lanka and Burma, but year 0 in Thailand, Laos and Cambodia. Thus the year 2500 B.E. occurred in 1956 in the former countries, but in 1957 in the latter. In Thailand in 1888 King Chulalongkorn decreed a National Thai Era, dating from the founding of Bangkok on 6 April 1782. In 1912 New Year's Day was shifted to 1 April. In 1941 Prime Minister Phibunsongkhram decided to count the years since 543 BC. This is the Thai solar calendar using the Thai Buddhist Era aligned to the western solar calendar.
- BE for Burmese Era – from Burmese calendar originally with an epochal year 0 date of 22 March 638; from which derived CS for Chula Sakarat era; variously known as LE Lesser Era; ME Minor Era – the Major or Great Era being the Saka Era of the Indian national calendar

B.E. of the Bahá'í calendar is below.

=== Bahá'í ===
- B.E. – The Bahá'í calendar dates from the year of the declaration of the Báb. Years are counted in the Bahá'í Era (BE), which starts its year 1 from 21 March 1844.

=== Jewish ===
- A.M. (or AM) – for the Latin Anno Mundi, meaning "in the year of the world", has its epoch in the year 3761 BC. This was first used to number the years of the modern Hebrew calendar in 1178 by Maimonides. Precursors with epochs one or two years later were used since the 3rd century, all based on the Seder Olam Rabba of the 2nd century. The year beginning in the northern autumn of 2000 was 5761 AM.

=== Zoroastrian ===
- The Zoroastrian calendar used regnal years since the reform by Ardeshir I, but after the fall of the Sassanid Empire, the ascension of the last Sassanid ruler, Yazdegerd III of Persia, crowned 16 June 632, continued to be used as the reference year, abbreviated Y.Z. or "Yazdegerd era".

== Modern ==
=== Political ===
- The Republican Era of the French Republican Calendar was dated from 22 September 1792, the day of the proclamation of the French First Republic. It was used in Revolutionary France from 24 October 1793 (on the Gregorian calendar) to 31 December 1805.
- The Positivist calendar of 1844 takes 1789 as its epoch.
- The Republican era is used by the Republic of China (now usually known as "Taiwan") since 1912, which is the first year of the republic. Coincidentally, this is the same as the Juche era used in North Korea, the year of the birth of its founder Kim Il-Sung.
- The Era Fascista 'Fascist Era' was instituted by the Italian Fascists and used Roman numerals to denote the number of years since the March on Rome in 1922. Therefore, 1934, for example, was XII E.F. (era fascista). This era was abolished with the fall of fascism in Italy on 25 July 1943, but restored in the northern part of the country during the Italian Social Republic. The Gregorian calendar remained in simultaneous use and a double numbering was adopted: the year of the Common era was presented in Arabic numerals and the year of the fascist era in Roman numerals. The year of the Fascist calendar began on 29 October, so, for example, 27 October 1933 was XI E.F. but 30 October 1933 was XII E.F.
- China traditionally reckoned by the regnal year of its emperors, see Chinese era name. Most Chinese do not assign numbers to the years of the Chinese calendar, but the few who do, like expatriate Chinese, use a continuous count of years from the reign of the legendary Yellow Emperor, using 2698 BC as year 1. Western writers begin this count at either 2637 BC or 2697 BC (see Chinese calendar). Thus, the Chinese years 4637, 4697, or 4698 began in early 2000.
- In Korea, from 1952 until 1961 years were numbered via Dangi years, where 2333 BC was regarded as the first such year.
- The Assyrian calendar, introduced in the 1950s, has its era fixed at 4750 BC.
- The Japanese calendar dates from the accession of the current Emperor of Japan. The current emperor took the throne in May 2019, which became Reiwa 1, and which was until then Heisei 31.
- The United States government sometimes uses a calendar of the era of its Independence, fixed on 4 July 1776, together with the Anno Domini civil calendar. For instance, its Constitution is dated "the Seventeenth Day of September in the Year of our Lord one thousand seven hundred and Eighty seven and of the Independence of the United States of America the Twelfth." Presidential proclamations are also dated in this way.

=== Religious ===
- A.D. – "After Dianetics". In Scientology, years are numbered relative to the first publication of the book Dianetics: The Modern Science of Mental Health (1950).
- Y.O.L.D. – In the Discordian calendar, the standard designation for the year number is YOLD (Year of Our Lady of Discord). The calendar begins counting from 1 January 1166 BC in the Discordian year 0, ostensibly the date of origin of the Curse of Greyface. An alternate designation, A.D.D. has been occasionally seen (Anno Domina Discordia, a Latin translation of YOLD, but presumably also a play on attention deficit disorder).
- e.v. – Era vulgaris. (From Latin, meaning "common era", usually stylized in lowercase.) Used by some followers of Aleister Crowley to designate the era from the Thelemic calendar which is used by some Thelemites to designate a number of years since Crowley's inauguration of the so-called Aeon of Horus, which occurred on 20 March 1904, and coincides with both the Thelemic new year and a holiday known as the Equinox of the Gods. The abbreviation "A.N.", for Aerae Novae ("New Era" in Latin), is also used for dates in the Thelemic calendar.

=== Scientific ===
- B.P. – for Before Present, specifically, the number of radiocarbon years before 1950.
- Julian day number – for counting days, not years, its era fixed at noon 1 January, 4713 BC in the proleptic Julian calendar. This equals 24 November, 4714 BC in the proleptic Gregorian calendar. From noon of this day to noon of the next day was day 0. Multiples of 7 are Mondays. Negative values can also be used. Apart from the choice of the zero point and name, this Julian day and Julian date are not related to the Julian calendar. It does not count years, so, strictly speaking, it has no era, but it does have an epoch. Today (noon-to-noon UTC) the value is 2461264.
- Unix time – for counting elapsed seconds since the Unix epoch set at 00:00:00 or midnight UTC of 1 January 1970, though there are problems with Unix implementation of Coordinated Universal Time (UTC).
- Holocene calendar

== See also ==
- Calendar reform
- Common Era
- Julian day
- List of calendars
