= Keshava Sena =

Last king of Sena dynasty from 1225 to 1230

- Mahārājādhirāja

Sena king
- Reign: 1225 – 1230
- Coronation: 1225
- Predecessor: Vishvarupa Sena
- Successor: Position abolished
- Died: Sena kingdom
- House: Sena dynasty
- Father: Lakshmana Sena
- Religion: Hinduism

Keshava Sena, (Bengali: কেশব সেন), also known as "Keshab Sen" in vernacular literature, was the sixth and last known ruler of the Sen dynasty of the Bengal region on the Indian subcontinent. He was succeeded by Surya Sena, who was a vassal of the Devas, with his lineage ending after two more kings.

Preceded by Vishvarupa Sen	Sen Dynasty King, Bengal; 1225–1230	Succeeded by Deva dynasty

== See also ==
- List of rulers of Bengal
- History of Bengal
