= Lakshmana Era =

The Lakshmana Era (or the Lakshmana Sena Era) is year-numbering system that was established by Lakshmana Sena, a ruler of eastern India from 1178 to 1206. While there is some debate among historians about the start of the era, most currently agree that it is 1118-1119 AD.

The start of the era is sixty years before the start of Lakshmana Sena's reign. Scholars do not agree on why that year was chosen; it is likely to have been Lakshmana Sena's birth year.

Scholars have used Abul Fazl's Akbarnama, dates mentioned in Sanskrit, Bengali and Maithili manuscripts, and copper-plate inscriptions to deduce the start of the era. In the Akbarnama, Abul Fazl mentions that "in the country of Bang (Bengal) dates are calculated from the beginning of the reign of Lacchman Sen". He includes several other eras in use at the time, including the Salivahana and the Vikramaditya eras, and correspondences between all of them while discussing Akbar's introduction of his new era in 1584, the Tarikh-e-Ilahi (Divine Era). (The Tarikh-e-Ilahi would later serve as the basis of the Bangladeshi calendar.) Maithili-speaking scholars have used Vidyapati's work, where he states dates in both the Lakshmana Era and the Shaka Era.

The era was used in many manuscripts produced in Bengal and Bihar for at least the next 400 years. Most events in medieval Mithila were dated using this era.
