= Vishvarupa Sena =

King of Sena dynasty from 1206 to 1225

Vishwarupa Sena
- Mahārājādhirāja

Sena king
- Reign: 1206 – 1225
- Coronation: 1206
- Predecessor: Lakshmana Sena
- Successor: Keshava Sena
- Died: Sena Empire
- House: Sena dynasty
- Father: Lakshmana Sena
- Religion: Hinduism

Vishvarupa Sena ,(Bengali: বিশ্বরূপ সেন), also known as Biswaroop Sen in vernacular literature, was the fifth ruler from the Sena dynasty of the Bengal region on the Indian subcontinent.

Preceded by Lakshmana Sena	King of Sena Dynasty, Bengal; 1206–1225	Succeeded by Keshava Sena

== See also ==
- List of rulers of Bengal
- History of Bengal
- History of India
