= Brahmakshatriya =

Combination of Hindu social class

- In the Hindu varna system, Brahmakshatriya may refer to a Brahmin who pursues royalty, and hence concurrently adopts the Kshatriya varna.
- Progeny of Brahmin father and Kshatriya mother.

== Brahmakshatriya dynasties ==
- Sena Dynasty: The founder of the Sena rule was Samantasena who described himself as a Brahma-Kshatriya of Karnataka (Karnataka). He stated that he "singly slaughtered the wicked robbers of the wealth of Karnata (i.e., Karnataka)". The inscriptions of the Sena kings mention them as Brahma-Kshatriyas (Brahmins who ruled as Kshatriyas) or Kshatriyas.

== In Kerala ==
In Kerala, only the sons of a Nambuthiri father and a Kshatriya mother were recognized as Brahmakshatriya by the Nambuthiri Brahmins, while the son of a Brahmakshatriya father and a non-Kshatriya mother was regarded as non-Kshatriya. The Nambudiri Brahmins and Samantha Arasu Ballalas of Kasaragod are examples of Brahmkshatriyas by descent, while the Nambiathiri and Nambidi sect of Nambudiri Brahmins are Brahmkshatriyas by adopting a martial tradition.

== In Gujarat ==
In Gujarat, the Brahmakshatriyas as a community exists that bears cross caste identity. They are generally considered as a writer caste. Nagar Thatta is believed to be their original home, from where they came to Kutch around 400 years ago and were called Kutchi Brahmakshatriya and then into Ahmedabad which are called Gujarati Brahmakshatriyas.
