= Hemanta Sena =

King of Sena dynasty from 1070 to 1096

- Mahārājādhirāja, Rājarakshāsudaksha

Sena king
- Reign: 1070–1096
- Predecessor: Samanta Sena
- Successor: Vijaya Sena
- Died: Sena Empire
- Issue: Vijaya Sena
- House: Sena dynasty
- Father: Samantasena
- Religion: Hinduism

Hemanta Sena (Sanskrit: Hemantasena) was the founder and the first ruler of the Sena dynasty in the Bengal region of the Indian subcontinent. He previously served as a statesman of the Pala Empire.

== Biography ==
Hemanta Sena was born to a Hindu Vaishnavite family, and was the son of Samanta Sena; who settled in the Rarh region, originally from Karnataka, South India. According to a copper plate, The Senas settled in Western Bengal before the birth of Samanta Sena. Their family belonged to the Kshatriya varna status.

The weakening of the Pala Empire allowed Hemanta to be granted the opportunity to govern Rarh region and protect the emperors. He served this role from 1070 to 1096 CE. His son, Vijaya Sena, reigned after him as the second ruler of his dynasty.

== See also ==
- List of rulers of Bengal
- History of Bengal
- History of India
