= Ghatak (surname) =

Origin
- Origin: Bengali Hindu
- Region of origin: Bengal

Ghatak is an Indian family name and surname found mostly among Bengali Brahmins.

== History ==
Ghataks (literally, one who makes things happen) or matchmakers were middleman who established links between the two parties in a marriage. In the past it was not the custom of Indian society, especially of Bengali society, to allow boys and girls to mix freely. This is why the services of Ghataks were widely used to arrange marriages. Many Ghataks were professionals, and matchmaking was their source of livelihood. When the matchmaking resulted in a wedding, Ghataks used to be rewarded by both parties.

In the past, educated and respectable people used to take up matchmaking as a profession. They were known as 'Kulacharya' and used to maintain books with detailed histories of families. Some of these books have been used as sources for writing the history of Bengal. Some of the well-known matchmakers were Edu Mishra, Hari Mishra (c 13th century), Dhruvananda Mishra, Debibar Ghatak (15th century) and Nulo Panchanan (18th century). They used to enjoy a great deal of social prestige.

== Geographical distribution ==
As of 2014, 78.2% of all known bearers of the surname Ghatak were residents of India and 19.6% were residents of Bangladesh. In India, the frequency of the surname was higher than national average in the following states and union territories:

1. West Bengal (1: 7,406)
2. Tripura (1: 31,647)
3. Andaman and Nicobar Islands (1: 47,493)
4. Gujarat (1: 72,229)

== Notable people with the surname Ghatak ==
- Ajoy Ghatak (born 1939), Indian physicist
- Anup Ghatak (1941–2013), Indian cricketer
- Gita Ghatak (1931–2009), Indian actress and singer
- Kaushik Ghatak (born 1971), Indian television and film director
- Maitreesh Ghatak (born 1968), Indian economist and academic
- Manish Ghatak (1902–1979), Bengali poet and novelist
- Moloy Ghatak (born 1956), Indian politician
- Poulomi Ghatak (born 1983), Indian table tennis player
- Raj Ghatak (born 1973), Indian-born English actor
- Ritwik Ghatak (1925–1976), Bengali filmmaker
- Usha Ranjan Ghatak (1931–2005), Indian chemist
