= Ballāla Sena =

King of Sena dynasty from 1160 to 1178

Ballal Sen বল্লাল সেন
- Reign: 1160 – 1178
- Predecessor: Vijaya Sena
- Successor: Lakshmana Sena
- Spouse: Ramadevi
- Issue: Lakshmana Sena, Roopsundari & Kamaladevi
- Dynasty: Sena
- Father: Vijaya Sena

Ballāla Sena or Ballal Sen (Bengali: বল্লাল সেন; reign: 1160–1178), also known as Ballal Sen in vernacular literature, was the second ruler of the Sena dynasty of Bengal region of the Indian subcontinent. He was the son and successor of Vijaya Sena, and ended the Pala Empire by defeating Govinda Pala.

Ballala Sena married Ramadevi, a princess of the Western Chalukya Empire (who ruled from what is the modern Indian state of Karnataka) which indicates that the Sena rulers maintained close social contact with South India.

He is the best-known Sena ruler and consolidated the kingdom. He might have completed the conquest of Northern Bengal and also conquered Magadha and Mithila. According to a tradition in Bengal recorded in the Ballala-charita, Ballala Sena's Empire consisted of 5 provinces,

1. Vanga (Eastern Bengal)
2. Varendra (North Bengal)
3. Rarh
4. Mithila &
5. Bagari (South Bengal)

Some sources exaggeratedly claim that Ballal Sen had proceeded to Delhi, and was proclaimed emperor of Hindoostan. But neither the two inscriptions that survive from this region, nor the two great literary works, which were attributed to him, viz., Dan Sagar and Adbhut Sagar, allude to his military victories. On the other hand, these refer to his scholastic activities and social reforms. Ballala Sena is associated with the revival of orthodox Hindu practices in Bengal, in particular with the establishment of the reactionary tradition of Kulinism among Brahmins and Kayasthas. The Brahmins were classified into Kulin, Śrotriya, Vamsaja and Saptasati; the Kayasthas were classified into Kulin and Maulik, but there is no historical authenticity. His marriage to Ramadevi, the Chalukya princess also indicates that the Sens maintained the kingdom inherited from his father, which included the present day Bangladesh, the whole of West Bengal and Mithila, i.e., portions of North Bihar. According to a cryptic passage in Adbhuta Sagara, Ballala Sena, along with his queen, retired in his old age to the confluence of the Ganges and the Yamuna leaving his son, Lakshmana Sena, with the task of both maintaining his kingdom and completing his literary work.

According to a Sena epigraph, Ballala was an author. He wrote Danasagara in 1168. And in 1169, he started but did not finish writing Adbhutasagara. In Adbhutasagara, it was mentioned that Ballala Sena conquered Mithila while Vijaya Sena was still alive. Besides he introduced the practice of Kulinism.

== See also ==
- List of rulers of Bengal
- History of Bengal
