= Deopara Prashasti =

The Deopara Prashasti is a stone inscription (prashasti) eulogizing the Sena kings of Bengal. It was composed by Umapati Dhara, a minister in the court of Lakshmana Sena (c. 1178–1206), who was also one of several court poets. The inscription particularly praises Lakshmana Sena's grandfather Vijaya Sena (c. 1095–1158). The alphabet is a precursor of the modern Bengali alphabet, with 22 letters approximating the modern forms. The stone tablet was found in 1865 near the village of Deopara, now in Godagari Upazila of Rajshahi District of modern-day Bangladesh. This inscription described that Sena king Bijay Sen is the real founder of the Sena Empire.

The inscription mentions that both the Karnatas and the Senas coveted the Pala territories of Gauda and Vanga. This led to a conflict began between Mithila and the Senas with the Senas coming out victorious. Following on from this conflict, local tradition in Mithila confirms that parts of Mithila came under Sena hegemony.
