= Vijaya Sena =

King of Sena dynasty

- Parmeshvara; Parambhattaraka; Maharajadhiraja; Ariraja-vrishabha-sankara
- Reign: 1096-1160
- Predecessor: Hemanta Sena
- Successor: Ballal Sena
Names
- Vijaya Sena
- House: Sena

Vijaya Sena (Bangla: বিজয় সেন), also known as Vijay Sen in vernacular literature, was the son of Hemanta Sena, and the second ruler of the Sena dynasty. He conquered Bengal, fighting the kings of Gauda, Kamarupa, and Kalinga. He had capital in Vijayapuri and Bikrampur.

It appears from his records that he inherited the position of a subordinate ruler in Rarh under the Palas. He was possibly the same as Vijayraj of Nidravali, one of the fourteen Samanta kings who helped Ramapala in his recovery of Varendra.

== History ==
=== Establishing power in Rarh ===
Vijaya Sena took full advantage of the weakness of the Pala rulers. He obtained an independent position in Rarh in recognition of his help to Ramapala. He defeated the Palas and captured the throne of Gauda afterwards. His queen Vilasdevi was a princess of the Shur dynasty. Sandhyakar Nandi in his epic poem Ramacharitam attests to the existence of the Sur dynasty family in the southern Rarh in the first quarter of the 11th century. The same source, however, records the name of Lakshmishura, the lord of the Apara-Mandara (identified with Mandaran in the Hughli district) in the list of vassal chiefs who helped Ramapala. Vijaya Sena's matrimonial relation with the Sur family helped him in establishing his power in Rarh. He is also said to have entered into an alliance with the Orissan king, Anantavarman Chodaganga. This alliance certainly enhanced his political prestige. He is described as Chodganga-Sakha (friend of Chodganga) in the Vallala-charitam of Ānanda Bhaṭṭa.

=== Conquest of Bengal ===
It is beyond any doubt that Vijaya Sena established independent power in Bengal immediately after the demise of Ramapala. The Deopara Prashasti records that he defeated Nanya, Vir, Raghav and Vardhan. He vanquished the kings of Kamarupa and Kalinga. He also compelled the king of Gauda to flee away from his kingdom. It is not very difficult to identify the rivals of Vijaya Sena. Nanya can be identified with King Nanyadev (c 1097–1147 AD) of Mithila, another Karnat chief. Vir was perhaps Virgun, ruler of Kotatavi, a member of Rampala's samantachakra. Vardhan may be identified either with Dorpavardhan, ruler of Kausambi, or with Govardhan against whom Madanapala won a victory. Vijaya Sena's fight against Vir and Vardhan were perhaps meant to bring under control two other feudatory chiefs who also might have aspired for power. Raghav was no other than the king of Kalinga. He can be identified with Raghav, the Eastern Ganga king of Orissa from c 1157–1170 AD. The encounter between Vijaya Sena and Raghav probably took place towards the end of the former's reign. It is not unlikely that Vijaya Sena had to wage war against Raghav, although he maintained a friendly relation with Anantavarman Chodganga. Vijaya Sena's fight against Raghav was meant to frustrate the latter's aggressive designs. The reference in the Deopara prashasti to the fight between Vijaya Sena and the king of Kamrupa does not necessarily mean that the former invaded the province, although that is not impossible altogether. The king of Kamrupa, defeated by Vijaya Sena, was perhaps Vaidyadev, the minister of Kumarapala who declared independence, or his successor. It is not unlikely that Vaidyadev or his successor invaded the newly founded dominions of the Sens and was driven away by Vijaya Sena.

=== Ousting Pala Empire ===
The lord of Gauda who was made to flee by Vijaya Sena was Madanapala, the last known Pala king whose authority was, at that time, confined to north Bengal. It is learnt from the Pala epigraphic records that Madanapala's authority over north Bengal continued up to the 8th year of his reign, which falls in 1152–53 AD. Most probably Vijaya Sena established his own supremacy in North and North Western Bengal by ousting the Palas sometime after 1152–53 AD. It is recorded in the Deopara prashasti that he erected the magnificent temple of Pradyumneshvar at the find-place of the inscription, about 7 miles to the west of Rajshahi town. It is to be remembered here that no Pala record has yet been discovered in Bengal after Madanapala's 8th year of reign.

=== Invasion of South ===
It is also recorded in the Deopara inscription that Vijaya Sena's fleet advanced towards the west along the course of the Ganges. It seems that the Gahadvalas, who by this time had occupied parts of Bihar, were his target. However it is not clear from the inscription whether his naval expedition was successful.

=== Ousting Varmans ===
Vijaya Sena is said to have extended his hold over Vanga (southeastern Bengal) also. His Barrackpur copper plate was issued from Vikrampur, the capital of the Varmans who are found to have ruled in this area from the last quarter of the 11th century to the middle of the 12th century CE. So it seems probable that Vijaya Sena ousted the Varmans from southeastern Bengal in the middle of the 12th century CE.

Thus, by the middle of the 12th century CE, Vijaya Sena supplanted the Varmans, ousted the Palas and succeeded in establishing the rule of his own dynasty over the whole of Bengal. He seems to have consolidated his empire in Bengal by defeating other enemies. He had a very long reign of about 62 years. He was a Shaiva. He was liberal towards Brahmanas versed in the Vedas and the poor. He assumed the imperial titles of Paramaheshvara Parambhattarak Maharajadhiraj. He also took the proud title of Ariraj-Vrsabha-Shankara. It has been suggested on good grounds that Gaudorviskulprashasti (eulogy of the royal family of Gauda) and the Vijayprashasti (eulogy of Vijay) of the famous poet Shriharsha were inspired by the career of Vijaya Sena.

== See also ==
- Dhakeshwari Mata Temple, Kumortuli
- List of rulers of Bengal
- History of Bengal
- Sena Empire

Preceded by Hemanta Sena	King of Sena Dynasty, Bengal; 1097–1160	Succeeded by Ballala Sena
