= Govindapala =

Indian royalty

Govindapala or Govinda Pal (Bengali: গোবিন্দ পাল) is believed to be the successor of Madanapala the last ruler of the Pala dynasty in the Bengal region of the Indian subcontinent. However, the relationship between them is unknown.

Govindapala became ruler of the Gaya district after the death of Madanapala in 1161 AD. However, those after his 4th year use words like Vinastarajye and Gatarajye, which probably means his kingdom was destroyed sometime around 1165. If Govindapala indeed ruled after 1165, his reign probably coincided with Palapala. His -pala suffix, along with his usage of the title Gaudeshwara which means Lord of Gauda, may suggest he recaptured Gauda for a short time, and that he was the last member of the imperial Pala dynasty.

He was succeeded by Palapala, after whom the dynasty vanished into history, although some later kings are known from tradition, like Indradumnyapala and Bhimapala.

== See also ==
- List of rulers of Bengal
- History of India
- History of Bengal
