= Sena dynasty =

Hindu dynasty of Bengal (1070–1230)

- 1070–1230
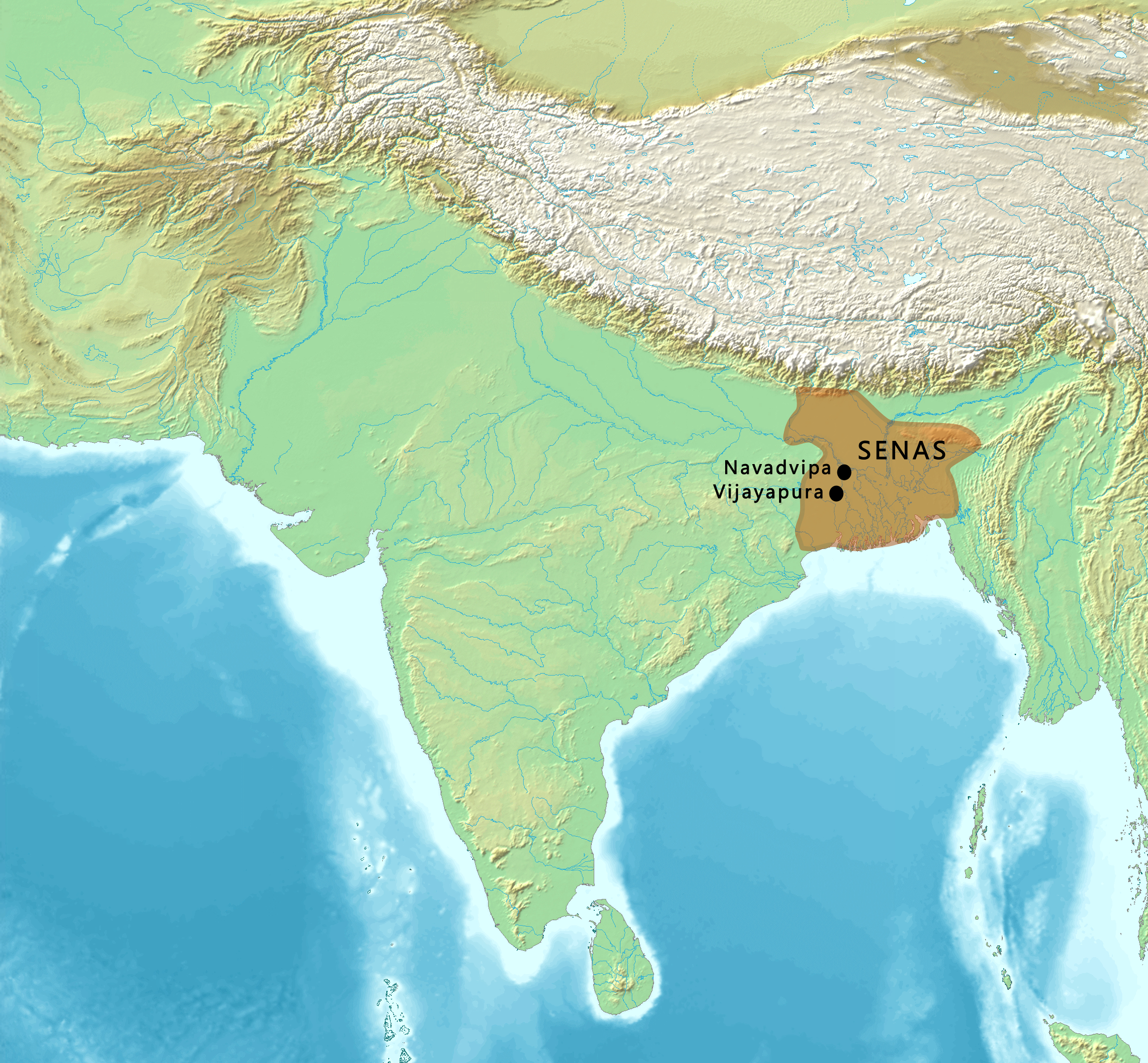
- Map of the Senas of Bengal
- Capital: Gauda, Bikrampur, Nabadwip, Lakhnauti
- Common languages: Old Bengali, Sanskrit
- Religion: Hinduism
- Government: Monarchy
- Mahārājādhirāja Vaṅgapati
  - 1070–1095 CE: Samanta Sena
  - 1095–1096 CE: Hemanta Sena
  - 1096–1159 CE: Vijaya Sena
  - 1159–1179 CE: Ballala Sena
  - 1179–1206 CE: Lakshmana Sena
  - 1206–1225 CE: Vishvarupa Sena
  - 1225–1230 CE: Keshava Sena
- Surya Sena
- Narayana Sena
- Laksmana Sena II
- Historical era: Middle Kingdoms of India
  - Established: 1070
  - Sena Revolution: 1070–1179
  - Sena-Gahadavala Conflicts: 1155–1206
  - Ghurid conquest of Bengal: 1205
  - Disestablished: 1230
Preceded by
Pala Empire
Varman dynasty
Samatata
Succeeded by
Deva dynasty
Khalji dynasty of Bengal

The Sena dynasty, or the Senas, were a Hindu dynasty that succeeded the Pala Empire and ruled much of the eastern region of the Indian subcontinent from Bengal, during the early medieval period, through the 11th and 13th centuries.

The dynasty's founder was Samanta Sena. After him came Hemanta Sena, who usurped power and styled himself king in 1095 AD. His successor Vijaya Sena (r. 1096–1159) helped lay the foundations of the dynasty and had an unusually long reign of over 60 years. Ballala Sena conquered Gaur from the Pala, became the ruler of the Bengal Delta, and made Nadia the capital as well. Ballala Sena married Ramadevi a princess of the Western Chalukya Empire which indicates that the Sena rulers maintained close social contact with south India. Lakshmana Sena succeeded Ballala Sena in 1179, ruled Bengal for approximately 20 years, and expanded the Sena dynasty to Odisha, possibly up to Varanasi. In 1203–1204 AD, Qutbuddin Aibak's (r. 1206–1210) protégé, Muhammad Bin Bakhtiyar Khalji, a general under the Ghurid Empire, launched an invasion and captured the capital city of Nadia. However Navadvip was not the permanent capital of the Sena rulers. The detailed account of this invasion is given in Tabaqat-i Nasiri.

== Origins ==
The rulers of the Sena Dynasty traced their origin to the south of India. Deopara Prashasti described the founder of Sena dynasty Samanta Sena, as a migrant Brahmaksatriya from Karnataka. The epithet 'Brahma-Kshatriya' suggests that Senas were Brahmins by caste who took the profession of arms and became Kshatriyas. The Sena kings were also probably Baidyas, according to historian P.N. Chopra.

A copper plate suggests that the Senas settled in western Bengal before the birth of Samantasena. The Senas entered into the service of Palas as sāmantas in Rāḍha, probably under Samantasena. With the decline of the Pālas, their territory had expanded to include Vaṅga and a part of Varendra by the end of Vijayasena's reign. The Palas were ousted in totality, and their entire territory annexed sometime after 1165.

== Inscription of Keshava Sena ==
A copperplate was found in the Adilpur or Edilpur pargana of Faridpur District in 1838 AD and was acquired by the Asiatic Society of Bengal, but now the copperplate is missing from the collection. An account of the copperplate was published in the Dacca Review and Epigraphic Indica. The copperplate inscription is written in Sanskrit and the characters dated to about the end of the twelfth century AD. In the Asiatic Society's proceeding for January 1838, an account of the copperplate states that three villages were given to a Brahmin in the third year of Keshava Sena. The grant was given with the landlord rights, which include the power of punishing the Chandrabhandas or Sundarbans, a tribe that lived in the forest. The land was granted in the village of Leliya in the Kumaratalaka mandala, which is situated in shatata-padamavati-visaya. The copperplate of Keshava Sena records that the king Vallala Sena carried away, from the enemies, the goddesses of fortune on palanquins (Shivaka), which elephant tusk staff supported; and also states that Vallala Sena's son, Lakshmana Sena (1179–1206), erected pillars of victory and sacrificial posts at Varanasi, Allahabad, and Adon Coast of the South Sea. The copperplate also describes the villages with smooth fields growing excellent paddy, the dancing and music in ancient Bengal, and ladies adorned with blooming flowers. The Edilpur copperplate of Keshava Sena records that the king made a grant in favour of Nitipathaka Isvaradeva Sarman for the inside of the subha-varsha.

== Society ==
The Sena rulers are said to have introduced Kulinism in Bengal. The Kulagranthas or Kulapanjikas (genealogical literatures) are the foundational narrative of Kulinism in Bengal, detailing its development over centuries and focusing on kulina lineages and social interaction norms. The Kulapanjikas state that King Ballal Sena initiated Kulinism, which conferred titles of nobility upon the Brahmanas, Kayasthas, and Vaidyas in Bengal.

According to texts, King Adisura invited Brahmins (accompanied by Kayasthas) to settle in the region from Kannauj and designated them higher in social status. The texts further state that Ballal Sena introduced Kulinism, designating certain lineages of Brahmins and Kayasthas with higher social status due to superior virtues and practices. This system further extended to Baidya jatis, not associated with the Kanauj migration. It appears to have started among the Baidyas with attributes like riches, education, good actions, etc., which were standardised by Samajapatis, Kulapanjikaras, and Ghatakas (professional matchmakers who served as the stewards of particular communities' family customs), as suggested by Sircar. Lakshmana Sena, the son and heir of Ballala Sena, is said to have made additional changes and controls to the establishment of Kulinism.

The accounts of Kulpanjis in connection to Kulinism are viewed with suspicion and have largely been accepted as unhistorical by most scholars. The Bangaon copper plate inscription reveals the early social history of Bengal and Kulinism, with King Vigrahapala III granting land to Ghantuka Sarman, a Sandilya gotra Brahmin living in Ituhaka. A Maithili Brahmin Ghantisa had previously owned the land and gave it to a Kolancha Brahmin due to a distant relationship. According to Bagchi, this trend of claiming connections to western Brahmin scholars led to the creation of Kulaji texts as Brahmins sought to prove their prestige. According to D.C. Sircar, it may have been Mithila immigrants who partially brought the Kulinism institution to Bengal.

== Architecture ==
The Sena dynasty is notable for building Hindu temples and monasteries. King Ballāla Sena built the Dhakeshwari Temple in 12-century CE in what is now Dhaka, Bangladesh.

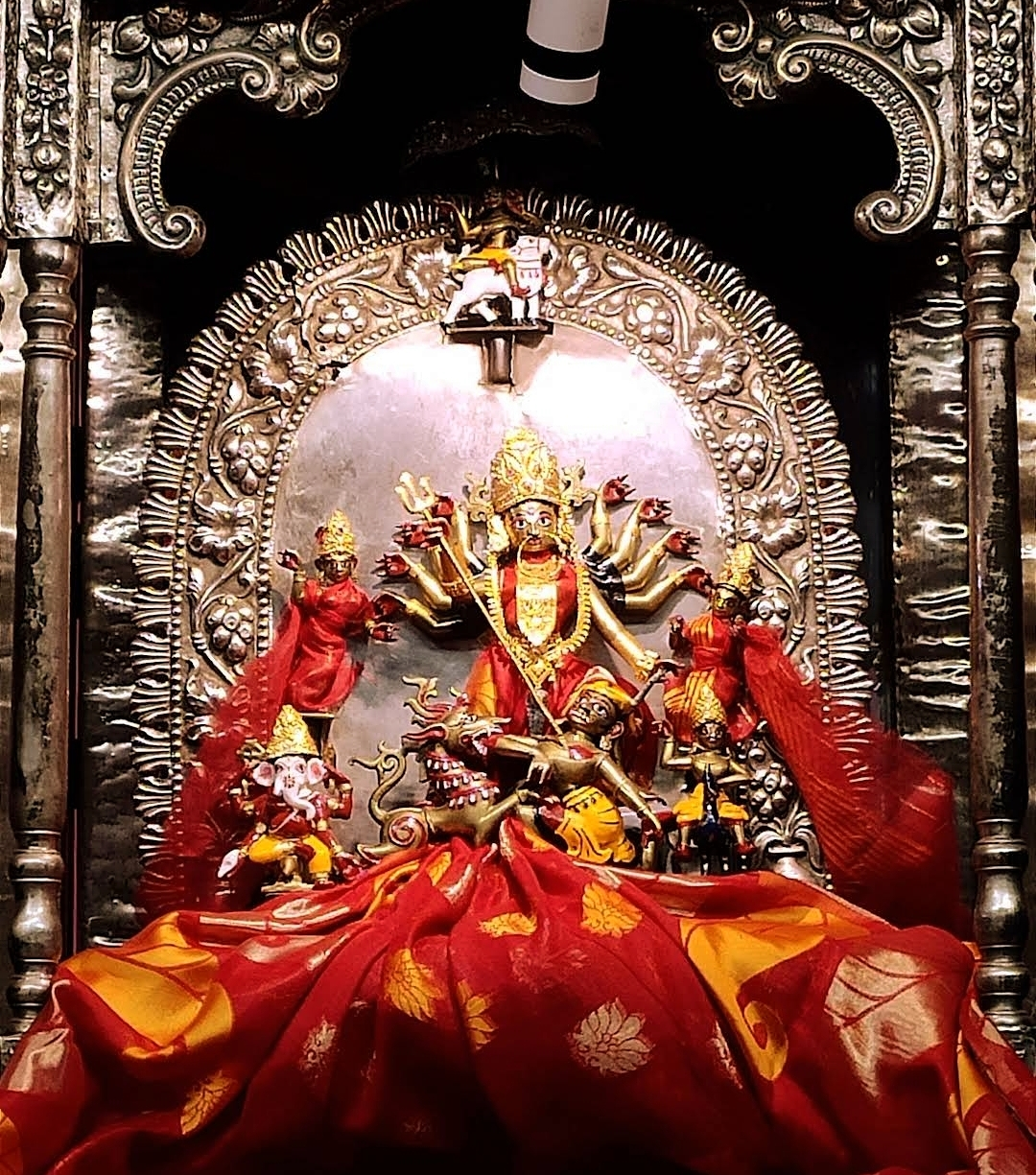
Dhakeswari Mata Idol

In Kashmir, the dynasty also likely built a temple knows as Sankara Gaureshwara.

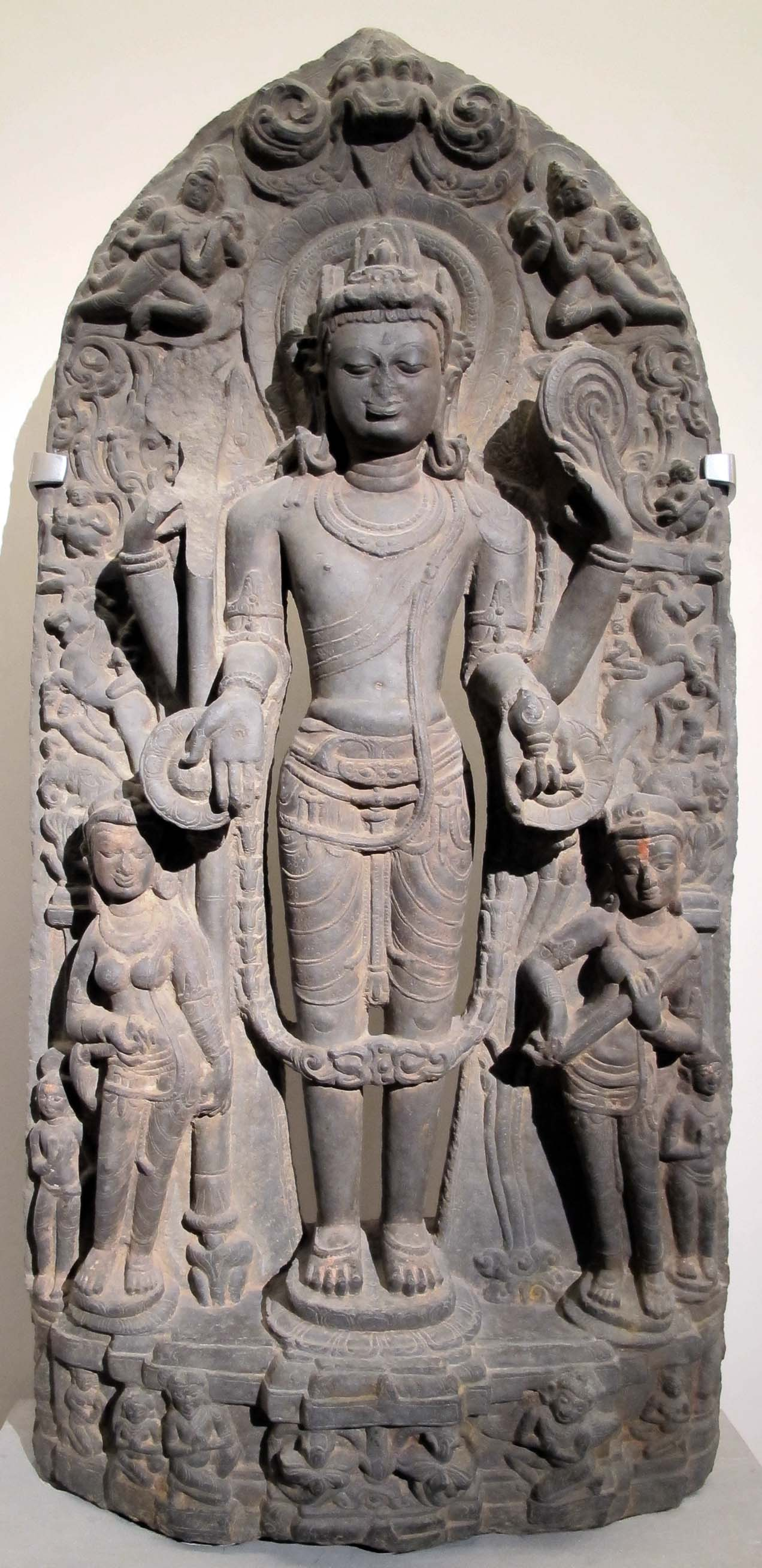
A sculpture of the Hindu deity Vishnu from the Sena period.

== Literature ==
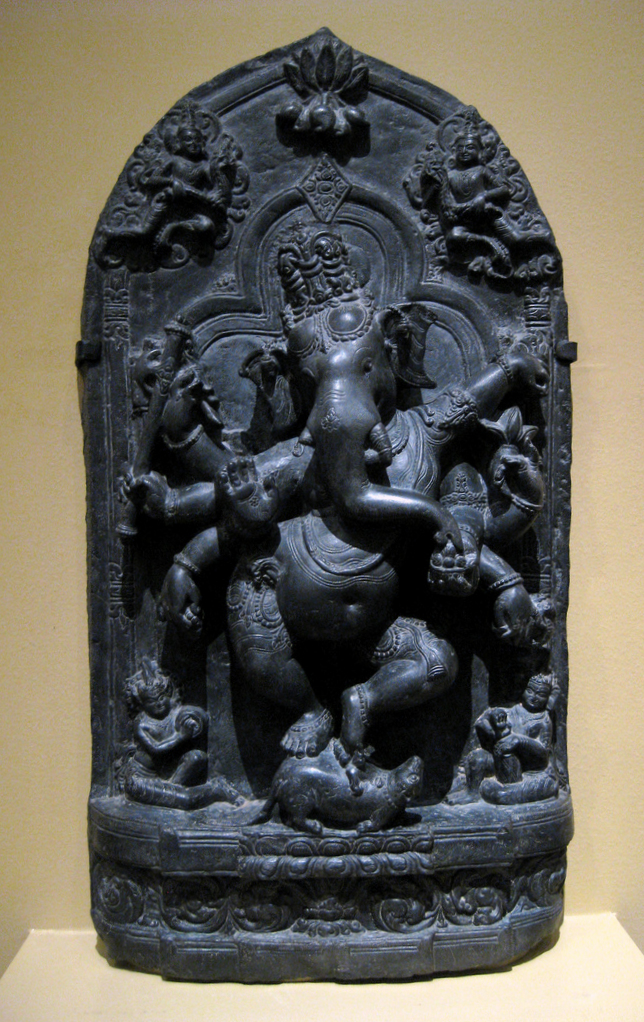
Art of the Senas, 11th century.

The Sena rulers were also great patrons of literature. During the Pala dynasty and the Sena dynasty, the development of Bengali was witnessed.Among the poets at the court of Lakshmana Sena were:

- Govardhana
- Sarana
- Jayadeva
- Umapati
- Dhoyi/Dhoyin

== Coinage ==
In the political history of Bengal, Sena dynasty was a mighty ruling dynasty in power. Various currency names have been regularly mentioned in the Sena writings, such as Purana, Chalana, Dharan, Dramma. These terms were used to mean a silver coin weighing 32 ratis (56.6 grains) or a karshapan weighing scale. The term Kapardaka Purana is seen as a medium of exchange in the writings of the Sena kings and other contemporary kings. Kapardak means Cowrie in Sanskrit and 'Chalana' means a coin. The conjunction ‘kapardaka-purana’ refers to a medium of exchange whose quality is equal to that of a purana or silver coin (56.6 grains), but which is actually calculated by the proportional denominator. The table found in the traditional arithmetic of Bengal contained 1260 cowries instead of one silver coin (Purana or Dramma). That is, the ratio of Purana and Kapardaka is 1: 1280. Reliable evidence of the widespread use of cowrie in early medieval Bengal has been found in excavations at Paharpur and Kalgang (Bihar near Bhagalpur). Early medieval Bengal saw the scarcity of precious coins and the widespread circulation of cowries. Scholars have long sought to explain the virtual limitations of coins at this time.

== Conflicts ==
=== With the Karnats of Mithila ===
The Karnatas and the Senas both coveted the Pala territories of Gauda and Vanga. This led to a conflict began between Mithila and the Senas with the Senas coming out victorious. Following on from this conflict, local tradition in Mithila confirms that parts of Mithila came under Sena hegemony.

=== With the Gahadavalas ===
The Sena-Gahadavala conflicts were a series of frequent expeditions of the Sena dynasty into the dominions of the Gahadavala dynasty, after the death of the Gahadavala emperor Govindachandra. Senas invaded Magadha, Gaya, Varanasi and Prayagraj.

=== With the Varmans ===
Bhoja Varman, son of Samalavarman was the last independent ruler of Varman Dynasty and the Belava plate was issued in his fifth regnal year from the jayaskandhavara situated at Bikramapura. He was defeated by Vijaysena and rule of Varmans over southeast Bengal came to an end.

=== With the Ghurids ===
Muhammad Bakhtiyar Khalji emerged victorious in his campaign at the Sena capital, Nabadwip. He established his kingdom at Lakhnauti which included a small part of Varendra. Following their defeat, Lakshmana Sena, the eighty years old ruler of the Sena dynasty, retreated to the southeastern region of Bengal.

=== With the Delhi Sultanate ===
Following the Ghurid capture of Lakhnauti, Lakshmana Sena's successors, Vishvarupa Sena and Keshava Sena, maintained their independence in the south and eastern Bengal. Inscriptions such as the Madanpara and Edilpur copper plates record that Vishvarupa Sena assumed the martial title Ariraja-Ghatuka-Shankara ("Destroyer of Enemy Kings"). These epigraphic records explicitly credit the later Sena rulers with military victories against the Garga-Yavanas, a contemporary term used to describe the Muslim invaders. To counter the cavalry-heavy forces of the Delhi Sultanate, the Senas strategically leveraged the riverine terrain of Bengal and deployed their swifter Gaudiya naval fleet. According to contemporary accounts like the Tabaqat-i-Nasiri, this defensive resistance successfully checked incursions by early Lakhnauti governors like Malik Saifuddin Aibak, maintaining Sena sovereignty in southeastern Bengal until the mid-13th century.

== Decline ==
Main South Asian polities in 1175, on the eve of the Ghurid Empire invasion of the subcontinent

Downfall of Sena dynasty was destined under the rule of weak rulers of this dynasty. This dynasty started declining during the rule of Lakshmana Sena who was the last significant Sena king. He was succeeded by his two sons Vishvarupa Sena and Keshava Sena. Probably they ruled till at least 1230 AD. However it was learnt from Tabaqat-i-Nasiri that the descendants of Lakshmana Sena ruled in Bengal (Bang) till at least 1245 AD or 1260 AD.

== Legacy ==
The Senas and their descendants merged into the Kayastha caste-group, heralding them as the neo-Kshatriyas of Bengal — hence, Abul Fazl would write that Bengal had always been ruled by Kayasthas. The actual caste-status of Senas — notwithstanding the anachronism — remain contested in popular memory: premodern Baidya genealogies claim the Senas as their own which are agreed upon by some Brahmin genealogies but rejected by Kayastha ones.

=== Nepal ===
In the 16th century, a dynasty emerged in the southern parts of Nepal near the border with Bihar which used the Sena surname and claimed descent from the Senas of Bengal. One of their branches formed the Sena dynasty of Makwanpur which ruled from the fort of Makwanpur Gadhi. This branch of the Sena dynasty adopted the local language of the region, Maithili which became their state language.

=== Suket and Mandi states ===
The rulers of Suket and Mandi states claim descent from the Sena dynasty via Vijaya Sena. Vijaya Sena had two sons, Sahu Sen, who ruled over Suket, and Bahu Sen, who ruled over Kullu.

== Family tree ==
Sena dynasty

Hemanta; Sena^{(1)} r. 1095-1096
Vijaya; Sena^{(2)} r. 1096-1159
Ballala; Sena^{(3)} r. 1159-1179
Lakshmana; Sena^{(4)} r. 1179-1206
Vishvarupa; Sena^{(5)} r. 1206-1225	Keshava; Sena^{(6)} r. 1225-1230

== See also ==
- Dhakeshwari Mata Temple, Kumortuli
- History of Bengal
- History of India
- Edilpur Copperplate

Preceded by Pala dynasty	Bengal dynasty	Succeeded by Deva dynasty Khalji dynasty

Timeline and cultural period	Indus plain (Punjab-Sapta Sindhu-Gujarat)	Gangetic Plain			Central India	Southern India
Timeline and cultural period	Indus plain (Punjab-Sapta Sindhu-Gujarat)	Upper Gangetic Plain (Ganga-Yamuna doab)	Middle Gangetic Plain	Lower Gangetic Plain	Central India	Southern India
IRON AGE
Culture	Late Vedic Period	Late Vedic Period; Painted Grey Ware culture	Late Vedic Period; Northern Black Polished Ware		Pre-history	
6th century BCE	Gandhara	Kuru-Panchala	Magadha		Adivasi (tribes)	Assaka
Culture	Persian-Greek influences	"Second Urbanisation"; Rise of Shramana movements Jainism - Buddhism - Ājīvika - Yoga			Pre-history	
5th century BCE	(Persian conquests)		Shaishunaga dynasty		Adivasi (tribes)	Assaka
4th century BCE	(Greek conquests)	Nanda empire				
HISTORICAL AGE
Culture	Spread of Buddhism				Pre-history	
3rd century BCE	Maurya Empire					Satavahana dynasty Sangam period (300 BCE – 200 CE); Early Cholas; Early Pandyan kingdom Cheras
Culture	Preclassical Hinduism (Note: Michaels (2004) p.39) - "Hindu Synthesis" (Note: Hiltebeitel (2002)) (ca. 200 BCE - 300 CE) (Note: Michaels (2004) p.39) (Note: Hiltebeitel (2002)); Epics - Puranas - Ramayana - Mahabharata - Bhagavad Gita - Brahma Sutras - Smarta Tradition; Mahayana Buddhism					
2nd century BCE	Indo-Greek Kingdom		Shunga Empire; Maha-Meghavahana Dynasty			Satavahana dynasty Sangam period (300 BCE – 200 CE); Early Cholas; Early Pandyan kingdom Cheras
1st century BCE	Indo-Greek Kingdom		Shunga Empire; Maha-Meghavahana Dynasty			Satavahana dynasty Sangam period (300 BCE – 200 CE); Early Cholas; Early Pandyan kingdom Cheras
1st century CE	Indo-Scythians; Indo-Parthians		Kuninda Kingdom			Satavahana dynasty Sangam period (300 BCE – 200 CE); Early Cholas; Early Pandyan kingdom Cheras
2nd century	Kushan Empire					Satavahana dynasty Sangam period (300 BCE – 200 CE); Early Cholas; Early Pandyan kingdom Cheras
3rd century	Kushano-Sasanian Kingdom; Western Satraps	Kushan Empire		Kamarupa kingdom	Adivasi (tribes)	Satavahana dynasty Sangam period (300 BCE – 200 CE); Early Cholas; Early Pandyan kingdom Cheras
Culture	"Golden Age of Hinduism"(ca. CE 320-650) (Note: Michaels (2004) p.40); Puranas - Kural; Co-existence of Hinduism and Buddhism					
4th century	Kidarites	Gupta Empire; Varman dynasty				Andhra Ikshvakus; Kalabhra dynasty Kadamba Dynasty; Western Ganga Dynasty
5th century	Hephthalite Empire	Alchon Huns				Vishnukundina; Kalabhra dynasty
6th century	Nezak Huns; Kabul Shahi; Maitraka				Adivasi (tribes)	Vishnukundina; Badami Chalukyas; Kalabhra dynasty
Culture	Late-Classical Hinduism (ca. CE 650-1100) (Note: Michaels (2004) p.41); Advaita Vedanta - Tantra; Decline of Buddhism in India					
7th century	Indo-Sassanids		Vakataka dynasty Empire of Harsha	Mlechchha dynasty	Adivasi (tribes)	Badami Chalukyas; Eastern Chalukyas; Pandyan kingdom (revival); Pallava
7th century	Karkota dynasty				Adivasi (tribes)	
8th century	Kabul Shahi	Pala Empire			Adivasi (tribes)	Eastern Chalukyas; Pandyan kingdom Kalachuri
9th century	Gurjara-Pratihara				Adivasi (tribes)	Rashtrakuta Empire; Eastern Chalukyas; Pandyan kingdom Medieval Cholas; Chera Perumals of Makkotai
10th century	Ghaznavids			Pala dynasty Kamboja-Pala dynasty	Adivasi (tribes)	Kalyani Chalukyas; Eastern Chalukyas; Medieval Cholas; Chera Perumals of Makkotai; Rashtrakuta
References and sources for table References Sources: Flood, Gavin D. (1996), An Introduction to Hinduism, Cambridge University Press; Hiltebeitel, Alf (2002), Hinduism. In: Joseph Kitagawa, "The Religious Traditions of Asia: Religion, History, and Culture", Routledge; Michaels, Axel (2004), Hinduism. Past and present, Princeton, New Jersey: Princeton University Press
