= Lakshmana Sena =

King of Sena dynasty from 1178 to 1206

Lakshman Sen

King of Sena dynasty
- Reign: 1178–1206
- Predecessor: Ballala Sena
- Successor: Madhava Sena
- Spouse: Tandra Devi
- Issue: Vishvarupa Sena; Keshava Sena; Madhava Sena
Names
- Lokkhon Sen (in Bangla)
- House: Sena
- Father: Ballala Sena
- Mother: Ramadevi
- Religion: Hinduism

Lokkhon Sen or Lakshmana Sena (Bengali: লক্ষ্মণ সেন; reign: 1178–1206) was the ruler from the Sena dynasty of the Bengal region on the Indian subcontinent. His rule lasted for 28 years, in which his empire, at its peak, possessed the territories of Gauda, Kamrupa, Kalinga, Magadha, and Kashi.

== Accession ==
Lakshmana Sena succeeded his father, Ballala Sena. The history of his reign can be reconstructed from the epigraphs of his time that include the Deopara Prashasti stone inscriptions and copper plates from his successors. Tabaqt-i-Nasiri, composed by 1260, is another source of information about his reign.

== Military campaigns ==
In his youth, Lakshmana Sena led military campaigns against Gauḍa, Kamarupa, Kalinga, and Varanasi (under the rule of Gahadavala King Jayachandra), and helped his grandfather Vijaya Sena and father Ballala Sena to expand the borders of the Sena kingdom. However, he ascended to the throne of Bengal himself at an advanced age.

== Art and other contributions ==
Lakshmana Sena was interested in literature and composed a number of Sanskrit poems. He completed Adbhuta Sagara, a book incompletely written by his father. He assembled some of the major figures in contemporary Sanskrit literature — Jayadeva, Dhoyin and Sharan — as his court poets. Among his other courtiers, Shridharadasa, Halayudh Mishra, and Umapati Dhara also produced important treatises and works of literature. Lakshman Sena established a calendar era called the Lakshmana Era that was used in Bengal and Bihar for at least 400 years. He also founded the prominent medieval city of Lakhnauti.

== Religion ==
He was a devoted Vaishnava Hindu and took up titles like Paramavaisnava or Paramanarasingha to reflect that. Lakshmansena's faith and generosity even attracted the attention of Minhaj-i-Siraj, who designated him as a 'great Rai' of Bengal and compared him with Sultan Qutubuddin Aibak.

== Later reign ==
After subjugating Bihar in 1200, Turko-Afghan invader Bakhtiyar Khaliji's forces entered Nabadwip in Bengal. Subsequently, Bakhtiyar went on to capture the capital and the principal city, Lakhnauti.

Bakhtiyar marched against Bengal with a band of well-trained horsemen. He was at first treated in Nadia as a horse dealer. At that time Lakshmana Sena was an octogenarian. The old Sena king, who was then at his dinner, was completely taken by surprise. When Bakhtiyar captured Nadia, Lakshmana Sena withdrew to southeastern Bengal, where his sons continued the rule of the Senas for some time. The detailed account of this invasion is given in Tabaqat-i-Nasiri. However, the laudatory verse of Sarana refers to Lakshmana Sena's victory against a Mlechchha king, who may be regarded as a Muslim ruler in Bengal.

== See also ==
- List of rulers of Bengal
