= Donaldson =

Donaldson is a Scottish and Irish patronymic surname meaning "son of Donald". It is a simpler Anglicized variant for the name MacDonald. Notable people with the surname include:

== A ==
- Alastair Donaldson (1955–2013), Scottish musician
- Alex Donaldson (1890–1972), Scottish footballer
- Alexander Donaldson (disambiguation), multiple people
- Ally Donaldson (born 1943), Scottish footballer
- Andrea Donaldson, Canadian theatre director
- Andrew Brown Donaldson (1840–1919), English artist
- Andrew Donaldson (footballer, born 1884) (fl. 1910s), Scottish footballer
- Andy Donaldson (English footballer) (1925–1987), English footballer
- Arthur Donaldson (1901–1993), Scottish politician and journalist
- Arthur Donaldson (actor) (1869–1955), Swedish-American actor

== B ==
- Ben Donaldson (rugby league), Australian rugby league player
- Bob Donaldson (1868–1947), Scottish footballer
- Blake F. Donaldson (1892–1966), American Physician
- Bobby Donaldson (1922–1971), American drummer
- Brittni Donaldson (born 1993), American basketball coach
- Bruce Donaldson (politician) (born 1938), Australian politician

== C ==
- Charles Edward McArthur Donaldson (1903–1964), Scottish politician
- Chris Donaldson (born 1975), New Zealand sprinter
- CJ Donaldson (born 2004), American football player
- Clayton Donaldson (born 1984), English footballer
- Clyde Donaldson (1894–1979), Australian rules footballer
- Colby Donaldson (born 1974), American television actor

== D ==
- Dave Donaldson (footballer born 1954), English footballer
- Dave Donaldson (footballer born 1941), English footballer
- David Donaldson (disambiguation), multiple people
- Denis Donaldson (1950–2006), Northern Irish volunteer in the Provisional IRA and a member of Sinn Féin
- Doug Donaldson (born 1957), Canadian politician

== E ==
- Ed Donaldson (born 1959), American boxer
- Edward Donaldson (1816–1889), American naval officer
- Edward Mortlock Donaldson (1912–1992), British flying ace
- Elena Donaldson-Akhmilovskaya (1957–2012), Russian chess player
- Eric Donaldson (born 1947), Jamaican singer-songwriter

== F ==
- Frances Donaldson (née Lonsdale, 1907–1994), British writer and biographer
- Fred Donaldson (1937–2018), English footballer

== G ==
- Gary Donaldson (born 1952), Canadian ice hockey player
- Glenn Donaldson, American musician
- Gordon Donaldson (1913–1993), Scottish historian
- Gordon Donaldson (journalist) (1926–2001), Scottish-Canadian author and journalist
- Gordon Graham Donaldson (died 1809), British Army officer
- Graham Donaldson (1935–2001), Australian rules footballer
- Grant Donaldson (born 1976), New Zealand cricketer

== H ==
- Harvey J. Donaldson (1848–1912), American politician
- Hay Frederick Donaldson (1856–1916), English engineer
- Helen Donaldson (born 1968), Australian singer
- Henry Herbert Donaldson (1857–1938), American neurobiologist

== I ==
- Ian Donaldson, Scottish musician
- Ian Donaldson (footballer), Scottish footballer
- Ian Stuart Donaldson (1957–1993), British musician

== J ==
- J. Lyter Donaldson (1891–1960), American politician
- Jack Donaldson (disambiguation), multiple people
- Jakim Donaldson (born 1983), American basketball player in the Israeli National League
- James Donaldson (disambiguation), multiple people
- Jamie Donaldson (born 1975), Welsh golfer
- Jared Donaldson (born 1996), American tennis player
- Jeff Donaldson (disambiguation), multiple people
- Jeffery Donaldson, Canadian poet and critic
- Jeffrey Donaldson (born 1962), Northern Irish sex offender and former politician
- Jesse M. Donaldson (1885–1970), American politician
- Jimmy Donaldson (born 1998), American YouTuber known as MrBeast
- Joan Donaldson (1946–2006), Canadian journalist
- John Donaldson (disambiguation), multiple people
- Johnny Donaldson, American guitarist
- Joseph Donaldson (1891–1973), Canadian politician
- Josh Donaldson (born 1985), American baseball player
- Julia Donaldson (born 1948), English writer and playwright
- Julie Donaldson (born 1978), American journalist and beauty queen

== K ==
- Karen Donaldson (1947–2005), American Paralympic swimmer and athlete
- Kim Donaldson (artist) (born 1952), Zimbabwean artist
- Kristian Donaldson, American comic book artist

== L ==
- Leanne Donaldson (born 1968), Australian politician
- Liam Donaldson (born 1949), British doctor
- Lily Donaldson (born 1987), British model
- Lou Donaldson (1926–2024), American saxophonist

== M ==
- Margaret Donaldson (1926–2020), British psychologist
- Mark Donaldson (born 1979), Australian soldier
- Mark Donaldson (rugby player) (born 1955), New Zealand rugby union player
- Mary Donaldson, Baroness Donaldson of Lymington (1921–2003), British politician
- Mary Elizabeth Donaldson (born 1972), Australian-born Crown Princess of Denmark
- Michael Donaldson (disambiguation), multiple people

== N ==
- Norma Donaldson (1928–1994), American actress and singer

== O ==
- O'Neill Donaldson (born 1969), English footballer

== P ==
- Pat Donaldson (born 1943), Scottish bass guitarist
- Pete Donaldson (born 1981), radio and television presenter
- Peter Donaldson (disambiguation), multiple people

== R ==
- Ray Donaldson (born 1958), American football player
- Robert Donaldson (disambiguation), multiple people
- Roger Donaldson (born 1945), Australian-born New Zealand film producer, director and writer

== S ==
- Sam Donaldson (born 1934), American reporter and news anchor
- Scott Donaldson (born 1994), Scottish snooker player
- Simon Donaldson (born 1957), English mathematician
- St Clair Donaldson (1863–1935), British-born Australian archbishop
- Stephen R. Donaldson (born 1947), American novelist
- Stewart Donaldson (born 1961), British-American psychologist
- Stuart Donaldson (1812–1867), British-born Australian politician
- Sue Donaldson (born 1962), Canadian author, independent researcher and philosopher

== T ==
- Ted Donaldson (1933–2023), American actor
- Thomas Donaldson (disambiguation), multiple people
- Timothy Donaldson (1934–2013), Bahamian politician, banker, economist, and diplomat
- Tre Donaldson (born 2003), American basketball player
- Trose Emmett Donaldson (1914–1942), American naval lieutenant

== V ==
- Vance Young Donaldson (born 1791, date of death unknown), Northern Irish soldier and penal administrator

== W ==
- Walter Donaldson (disambiguation), multiple people
- William Donaldson (disambiguation), multiple people

== See also ==
- Donaldson Brown (1885–1965), financial executive and corporate director with DuPont and General Motors Corporation
- Donaldson Company, an industrial filtration services company
- Rebecca Donaldson-Katsopolis, fictional character on the TV sitcom Full House
