= Jayadeva birth controversy =

Birth controversy

The birthplace of the twelfth-century Sanskrit poet Jayadeva, author of the Gita Govinda, has been disputed, with the neighboring Indian states of Odisha, West Bengal and the region of Mithila in the state of Bihar staking a claim. This had led to a bitter feud between people on both sides that lasted for over a century. The issue is still debated by scholars.

== Bengali view ==
Early accounts by Bengali writers had linked Jayadeva to the famous king of Bengal Lakshmana Sena, the fourth ruler of the Sena dynasty and the last Hindu ruler of unified Bengal. The scholars identify this Kenduvilva with a site of the Ajay river in the Birbhum district of Bengal. These views originated from various Sanskrit and Bengali books. Jayadeva Charita, is one of them, authored by Banamali Das, then subsequently disseminated by Bengali historians. The book was written in 1803 when little was known about the poet's life. In 1906, M. M. Chakraborty suggesting through an article that the great poet belonged to Bengal in the Asiatic Society. In the 12th-century Sanskrit book Sekhasubhodaya written by Lakshmanasena’s court poet Sri Halayudha Mishra, a story is narrated about the arrival of poet Jayadeva and his wife Padmavati in Lakshmana Sena’s royal court. Śrīpāda Sanatana Goswami had seen the following verse engraved in the royal assembly hall of Navadvipa —

govardhanaś ca śaraṇo jayadeva umāpatiḥ |
kavirājaś ca ratnāni pañcaite lakṣmaṇasya ca ||

Kaviraja Goswami Jayadeva — a courtier of Bengal's Lakshmanasena — was one of the five jewels among the Emperor's attendants. According to the verse, Govardhana Acharya, Sharana, Jayadeva, Umapati Dhara, and Dhoyin — these five were the jewels of King Lakshmana Sena.

In the introductory portion of the Gitagovinda there is an ancient interpolated verse. In the verse, the merits of five poets famed as courtiers of Lakṣmaṇasena have been compared. Those four poets are Umāpati Dhara, Sharana, Jayadeva, Govardhana Acharya, and Dhoyin. The Sanskrit verse is as follows:

vācaḥ pallavayaty umāpatidharaḥ sandarbhaśuddhiṃ girāṃ
jānīte jayadeva eva śaraṇaḥ ślāghyo durūhakṛte |
śṛṅgārottarasatprameyaracanair ācāryagovardhana-
spardhī ko 'pi na viśrutaḥ śrutidharo dhoyī kavikṣmāpatiḥ ||

Jayadeva mentions the village of Kindubilva as his birthplace, a location in Birbhum where a traditional Baul festival is held each year; it was identified to have been the original Kenduli village of Jayadeva. Under the assumption that the illustrious poet was born there, that festival also became associated with Jayadeva. A nearby village acquired the sobriquet of "Jayadeva Kenduli" and became a tourist attraction, and the Baul festival was renamed as "Jayadeva Mela". Jayadeva lived extensively in Navadwip during the reign of the king of Bengal, Lakshman Sen, making his home not far from the king's palace. At that time, the king's chief scholar was Govardhan Acharya. According to Ashutosh Deb's Bengali dictionary, Jayadeva was Lakshman Sen's court poet. In the anthology Saduktikarnamrita, Jayadeva, in a verse composed by himself, praised Lakṣmaṇasena in the royal court of Lakṣmaṇasena. The verse is as follows:

lakṣmī-keli-bhujanga janga-makuṭa-pratyagra-ratnāṅkura-
śreṇī-śoṇa-pada-dvayānata-nṛpa-śreṇī-śiraḥ-śekhara |
devākṛṣṭa-samasta-garvita-nṛpa-śreṇī-kirīṭa-cchaṭā-
pīṭhāḷaṅkṛta-pāda-padma yuvayor lakṣmī-pate lakṣmaṇa ||

Shrila Bhaktivinoda Thakur writes in his Navadvipa-dhama-mahatmya that Lakshman Sen was delighted when he heard Jayadeva's hymn to the ten incarnations, the Dasavatara-stotra. When Govardhan Acharya notified the king that it was Jayadeva who had composed the hymn, he desired to meet the poet. He went incognito to Jayadeva's house. When he saw him, he noticed that Jayadeva possessed all the characteristics of a great and powerful spiritual personality, in spite of having originated centuries later during the time of Chaitanya. Also the Krishna worshipping was prevailing in Bengal for a long time before Sri Chaitanya. In the Gaudiya Vaishnava Abhidhana, it is stated that Jayadeva found his Radha Madhava Deities in this river's waters. It is also stated there that he used to rest and worship at the Temple of Shiva known as Kusheshwar, which is also on the banks of the Ajaya River.

The German scholar Georg Bühler had seen the name of King Śrī Lakṣmaṇasena in a Gītagovinda manuscript from Kashmir.

Sikh encyclopedist Kahn Singh Nabha writes in his Encyclopedia Mahan Kosh (1926) that Jayadev was born in Kendooli, Birbhum district, Bengal.

Sahitya Akademi's The Encyclopaedia of Indian Literature describes Jayadeva as a "Brahman [sic] of Bengal", who lived between 1201–1245.

== Odia view ==
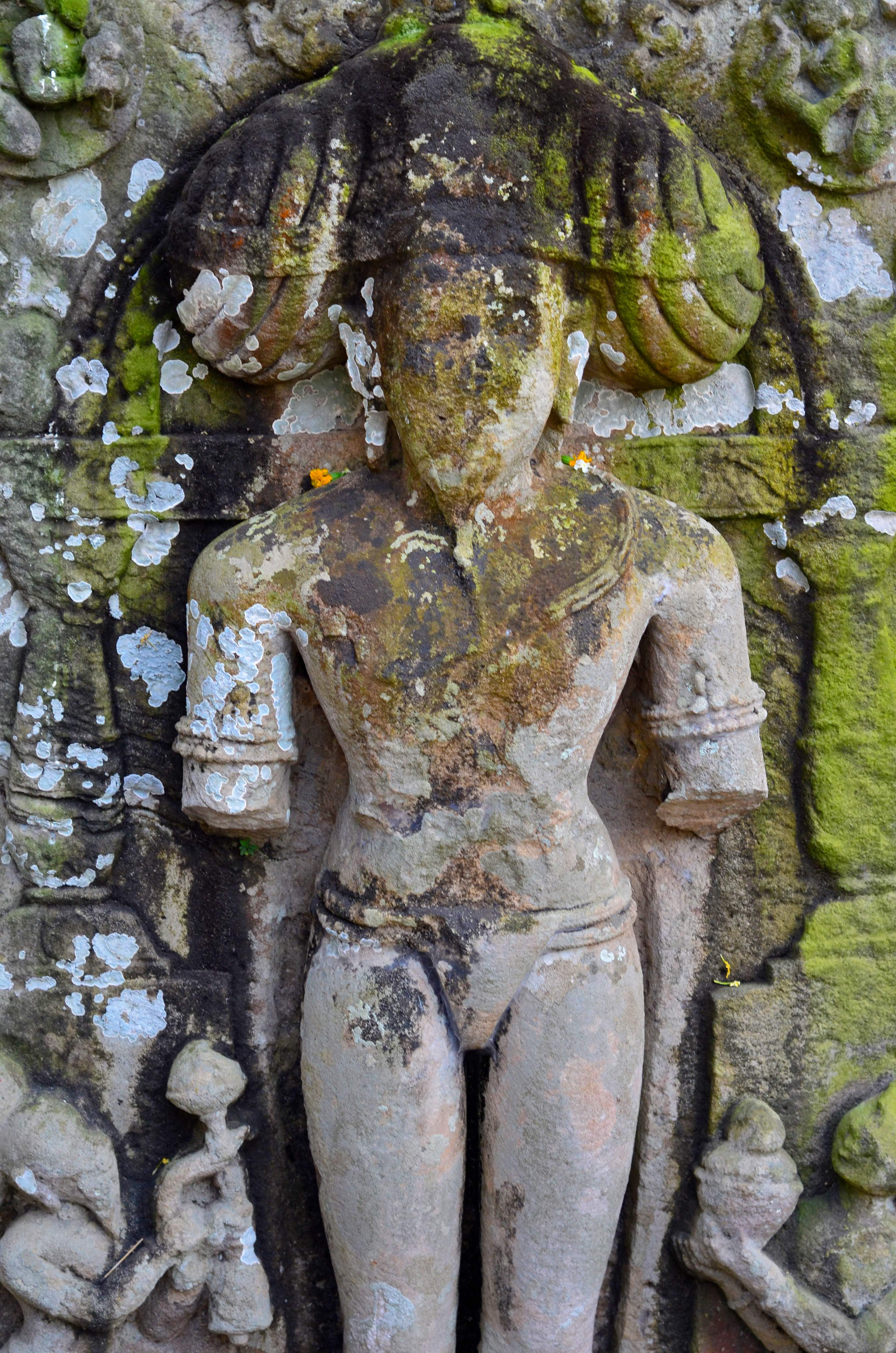
Ancient stone idol of Jayadeba at Akhandaleshwara Temple, Prataparudrapura, Odisha, India

Proponents of the Odia view cite evidence from archaeological, epigraphical, literary and musicological sources, among others. Archaeological discoveries establish Jayadeva's extended presence in Odisha. There also exists a village called Kenduli Sasan in Odisha where the Hindu deity Krishna, who was also the main theme in Jayadeva's works, has traditionally been worshipped as the main god. Coincidentally, the inhabitants of that village also worship Jayadeva. A Sasana is a name for villages that traditionally were centers of Brahmin scholarly activity in Odisha, and Jayadeva himself was a Brahmin. The Gita Govinda is said to have been composed in the Dashavatara Matha on Badadanda, Puri.

Furthermore, researchers opine that Jayadeva is among the central-most figures in Odia culture. Jayadeva's works, they observe, have spread to the southern India, but are rare in neighboring Bengal. It has been pointed out that the Gita Govinda's influence outside Odisha is most felt in the southern states of Telangana, Andhra Pradesh, Kerala, Karnataka and Tamil Nadu, where verses of the poet's work have been incorporated into the Kuchipudi, Kathakali and Bharatanatyam classical dance forms respectively. It is Jayadeva's ashtapadis that are sung in dance performances of Odissi, the classical dance of Odisha. Traditional Odissi Music is based on ragas and talas specified by Jayadeva's hymns. Jayadeva was a devotee of Krishna, and Krishna in the form of Jagannath is the central deity of Odisha, whereas the female deity Durga is prominent in Bengal. The Gita Govinda composed by Jayadeva is one of the popular themes in the traditional pattachitra paintings of Odisha. Additionally, a highly Sanskritised and sophisticated classical culture had been firmly entrenched in Odisha during that period, while neighboring Bengal only had a folk based culture until recent times.

=== Archaeological evidence ===
Supporters of Odisha as his birthplace, including the Government of Odisha, argue that the archaeological records, including temple inscriptions, palm-leaf manuscripts and lithographs of that era have revealed the poet's Odia origin. The worship of the Hindu deity, Krishna, in the form of Jagannath was widespread in Odisha during Jayadeva's birth. On the other hand, they argue that there is no archaeological evidence of such worship in Bengal until the arrival of Chaitanya Mahaprabhu, which was over three centuries after the era of Jayadeva. Inscription at the Lingaraja Temple in Old Bhubaneswar tells us that Jayadeva had been a member of the teaching faculty of the school at Shrikurmapataka. The inscriptions, that refer to "Sadhu Pradhana Jayadeva" were carved by the Odisha monarch of that period. Later discoveries of inscriptions at the Madhukeshwara and Simhachala temples, temples erected by Odia (Gajapati) monarchs, are believed to establish the linkage between Jayadeva and the dancing families of Kurmapataka, who held sway during the reign of Anantavarman Chodaganga Deva.

Thomas Leverton Donaldson, a scholar of architecture and sculpture of Odisha, remarks on the controversy:

"Many scholars identify this Kenduvilva with a site of the Ajaya river in the Birbhum district of Bengal. More convincing, however are arguments of Orissan scholars such as K. Mahapatra and B. Rath, who identify it with the village of Kenduli in the Puri district of Orissa, between the Prachi and Kusabhadra rivers."

=== Evidence based on medieval manuscripts ===
Historian Kedarnath Mahapatra refers to the evidence in manuscripts to observe historical opinions on the controversy, "There is little evidence, literary or archaeological, that the Gitagovinda was popular in Bengal prior to the advent of Chaitanya. In fact, Chaitanya first discovered the jewel of Gitagovinda when he visited Puri in 1590 CE, and came to realize the religious significance of the work from Raya Ramananda on the banks of the Godavari when he went on pilgrimage to the south." Donaldson adds, "In Orissa, on the other hand, the popularity of the Gitagovinda was almost immediate and the two earliest commentaries on the poem were produced there, the Bhavavibhavini by Udayana Acharya (AD 1190) and the Sarvangasundari by Kaviraja Narayana Dasa."

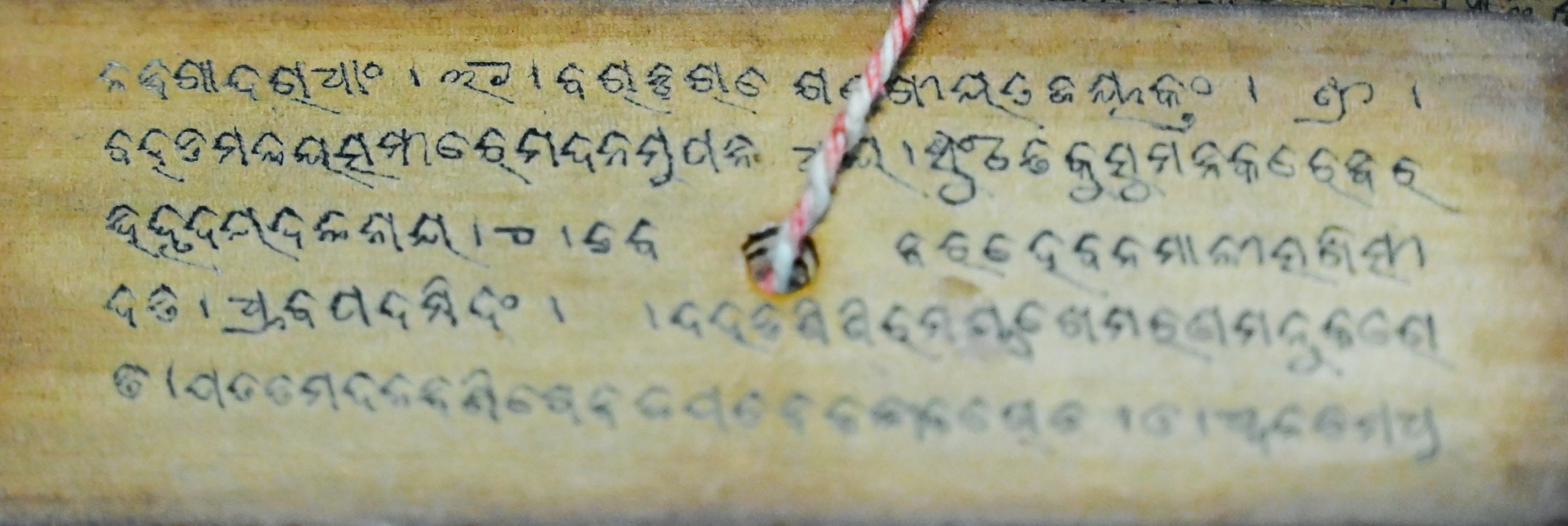
Handwritten palm leaf manuscript of Jayadeva's Gitagovinda by the medieval Odissi musician-poet Gopalakrusna Pattanayaka of Paralakhemundi

Furthermore, scholars maintain that accounts by numerous medieval authors, such as Chandra Dutta of Mithila and Navaji of Gwalior support Odisha as the poet's birthplace. The poet and hagiographer Mahipati of Maharashtra writes in his book Bhakti Vijaya, that Jayadeva's native village was very close to Puri. The Assamese text, Sampradaya Kula Dipak as well as the Telugu text, Sanskrita Kavi Jivani, contain elaborate descriptions of the poet's birth taking place near the Jagannatha Dhama in Utkala. Another book, Vaishnava Lilamruta by Madhaba Patnaik, who lived in the sixteenth century and was contemporaneous to Chaitanya, clearly mentions that the poet was born near Puri.

Some further details about Jayadeva have been garnered from Madhaba Patnaik's book. It gives a clear account of Chaitanya's visit to Puri and mentions that Chaitanya paid a visit to Kenduli Sasan near Puri to pay homage to Jayadeva and to sing passages from the Gita Govinda. The book mentions that Kenduli Sasan was in fact the birthplace of the illustrious poet. It also gives an account of Jayadeva's early life based on the legends around Puri.

=== Evidence from Jayadeva's own writings ===
Some historians now suggest that some of the poet's own compositions in Odia unequivocally support the idea that Jayadeva belonged to Puri, Odisha. For example Jayadeva mentions his birthplace as "Kendubilva by the sea" (Sanskrit "Kendubilva Samudra Sambhava") in his 7th Ashtapadi, and Birbhum, unlike Puri, does not abut on the sea. Jayadeva used to bathe each morning in the banks of a river, mentions the book Bhaktamala. A. K. Tripathy, an eminent scholar on Jayadeva, and P. C. Tripathy point out that the poet could never have walked daily to the river Ajeya which is 36 miles away from the Bengali village, unlike the Prachi river upon whose banks is situated the Kenduli village near Puri. Jayadeva's hymns refer to the ocean using the Sanskrit word "Mahodadhi" (presently Bay of Bengal), which is a typical name given to the sea in Puri. It's also argued that one of Jayadeva's compositions remotely suggest that he ever served in the court of any monarch. Besides, Lakshmana Sena ruled Birbhum between 1179 AD and 1185 AD, that was just about a few years after birth of the poet. Bengali scholars, Dr. Satyakam Sengupta and Dr. Ashis Chakravarti have confirmed Jayadeva's birth in Kendubilva of Prachi valley of Odisha, based on their research findings.

=== Musicological evidence ===
Various scholars have analysed the ragas and talas employed by Jayadeva, considered to be the first lyric in Sanskrit where the parameters of classical music have been delineated by the author. The ragas and talas employed by Jayadeva are peculiar to the tradition of Odissi music and this has been independently observed by several scholars as an indication of the poet's Odia origin. Musicologist Pandit Gopal Chandra Panda, who has done extensive research on traditional Odissi music renditions of the Gitagovinda, writes :

Jayadeva's Gitagovinda forms an inextricable part of Odissi classical music. The ragas used by Jayadeva such as Mangala Gujjari, Baradi, Desa Baradi are found only in Orissan kabyas, kabita, chhanda and chaupadi; these ragas are not found to be in usage outside Odisha. Why only ragas, according to many early commentators the talas used by Jayadeva such as 'Astatali' are only found in Odisha, and are not found to be in use anywhere else. From these musicological points it is very clear that Jayadeva is Odia.

In contrast, according to Thomas Leverton Donaldson, "Jayadeva's ragas do not match the lyrical patterns of Bengal, which unlike Odisha, does not even possess a classical vocal tradition. It is also noteworthy that all the musical notes (ragas) used in the Gitagovinda are fully utilised with greater dimensions by the old Oriya writers whereas these ragas are rarely met with in old Bengali literature." The lack of correlation between Bengali traditional music and the compositions of Jayadeva were independently observed in Barbara Stoler Miller's book, Love Song of the Dark Lord. Musicologist Kirtan Narayan Parhi affirms this, with special reference to the talas referred to by Jayadeva :

Jayadeva has composed this illustrious Gitagovinda as per the specifications of the Udramagadhi Pravrtti, Ardhamagadhi padasrita Giti, Bhinna Svarasrita Giti and Nava Talasrita Giti. The songs of the Gitagovinda are set to talas such as Rupaka, Nihsara, Jati, Astatala and Ekatali which are included in navatalas, commonly used in Odishi (music) till to-day. One has to acknowledge that the Gitagovinda was written in order to be sung before Lord Jagannatha and since then (12th century) the recital has been continued as a daily ritual in Srimandira to entertain the Lord.

== The Kaun Banega Crorepati faux pas ==
The April 16, 2007 episode of the popular Indian TV game show Kaun Banega Crorepati (KBC III) mentioned Jayadeva as the court poet of king Lakshmanasena of Bengal. This triggered an immediate volley of protests by the culture-aware people of Odisha. Shah Rukh Khan, the game show's host was denounced for spreading false information. The government of Odisha has also demanded an apology from Kaun Banega Crorepati as it claims that the game show "mutilated historical facts" and "hurt the feelings of the people of Odisha". The Jayadeva Foundation Trust launched a protest against the TV show. Some scholars have expressed concern over the false depiction of Jayadeva's origin by Kaun Banega Crorepati, which they call a "historical humbug".

== Postage stamps commemorating Jayadeva's birth ==
In July 2009, the government of India's Department of Posts has decided to release 11 stamps in Bhubaneswar to commemorate the birth of Jayadeva. One stamp depicts the poet himself, while the other ten show the 10 incarnations of Lord Vishnu (i.e., Dashavatara), that the poet popularized in his epic poem, the Gita Govinda. Chief Minister Naveen Patnaik unveiled the stamps at a special function in Jayadev Bhawan. The stamps are in the denomination of ₹5. A total of 8,00,000 (i.e., eight lakhs) stamps were released for sale in Odisha.

== See also ==
- Kenduli Sasan
- Jaydev Kenduli
