= Andrew Donaldson =

Andrew Donaldson may refer to:

- Andrew Donaldson (Scottish footballer) (born 1884)
- Andy Donaldson (English footballer) (1925–1987)
- Andrew Brown Donaldson (1940–1919), British artist
- Andy Donaldson (swimmer), Scottish-Australian marathon swimmer
