= John Donaldson =

John Donaldson may refer to:

== Academics and scholars ==
- John Dalgleish Donaldson (1941–2026), Scottish mathematician and father of Mary, Queen of Denmark
- John Donaldson (agriculturalist) (1799–1876), British agriculturalist and professor of botany
- John Donaldson (economist) (born 1948), economist at Columbia Business School
- John William Donaldson (1811–1861), British philologist and biblical scholar
- John Donaldson (music scholar) (1789–1865), English music scholar and educator

== Politics and law ==
- John Donaldson (Australian politician) (1841–1896), Treasurer of Queensland
- John Donaldson, Baron Donaldson of Lymington (1920–2005), British judge
- Jack Donaldson, Baron Donaldson of Kingsbridge (1907–1998), British politician

== Sports ==
- John Donaldson (Australian cricketer) (born 1950), Australian cricketer
- John Donaldson (New Zealand cricketer) (1919–1984), New Zealand cricketer
- John Donaldson (footballer), Scottish footballer
- John Donaldson (pitcher) (1891–1970), baseball pitcher in the Negro leagues
- John Donaldson (second baseman) (born 1943), baseball player in the American League
- John Donaldson (American football) (1925–2018), American football player
- John Donaldson (discus thrower) (born 1925), winner of the discus throw at the 1945 USA Outdoor Track and Field Championships
- William John Donaldson (born 1958), known as John Donaldson, chess player

== Arts and literature ==
- John Donaldson (author) (c. 1921–1989), British author and poet
- John Donaldson (painter) (1737–1801), miniature painter
- John M. Donaldson (1854–1941), American architect from Detroit, Michigan
- Johnny Donaldson, American guitarist

== Other ==
- John Owen Donaldson (1897–1930), American flying ace
- John P. Donaldson (1842–1920), American soldier in the American Civil War
- John W. Donaldson (1924–2008), U.S. Army general
- John Davidson (activist) (1971), Tourette syndrom activist, portrayed in I Swear (film)

== See also ==
- Jack Donaldson (disambiguation)
- Donaldson (disambiguation)
- John Donelson (1718–1785), American frontiersman, co-founded the settlement of Fort Nashborough, later Nashville, Tennessee
