= Thomas Donaldson =

Thomas Donaldson may refer to:

- Thomas Donaldson (ethicist), American philosopher and business ethics professor
- Thomas Donaldson (cricketer) (1882–c. 1960), English cricketer
- Thomas K. Donaldson (1944–2006), cryonics advocate
- Thomas Leverton Donaldson (1795–1885), British architect
- Thomas Quinton Donaldson Jr. (1864–1934), United States Army officer
- Thomas Donaldson, a winner of Henry Wilde Prize

== See also ==
- Donaldson
