= James Lowry =

James Lowry may refer to:

- James Lowry Donaldson (1814–1885), American soldier and author
- James Lowry Jr. (1820–1876), American politician
- James Lowry Robinson (1838–1887), American Democratic politician
- James K. Lowry (born 1942) zoologist
