= Jack Donaldson =

Jack Donaldson may refer to:

- Jack Donaldson, Baron Donaldson of Kingsbridge (1907–1998), British Minister for the Arts 1976–1979
- Jack Donaldson (athlete) (1886–1933), Australian sprinter
- Jack Donaldson (footballer) (1880–1934), Australian footballer

== See also ==
- Donaldson (disambiguation)
- John Donaldson (disambiguation)
