= Ben Donaldson =

Ben Donaldson may refer to:

- Ben Donaldson (rugby league) (born 1979), Australian rugby league footballer
- Ben Donaldson (rugby union) (born 1999), Australian rugby union player
