= General Donaldson =

General Donaldson may refer to:

- Hay Frederick Donaldson (1856–1916), British Army brigadier general
- James Lowry Donaldson (1814–1885), Union Army brigadier general
- John W. Donaldson (1924–2008), U.S. Army brigadier general
