= James Donaldson =

James or Jim Donaldson may refer to:

- James Donaldson (classical scholar) (1831–1915), Scottish classical scholar, and educational and theological writer
- James Donaldson (basketball) (born 1957), retired professional English-American basketball player
- James Donaldson (publisher) (1751–1830), publisher of the Edinburgh Advertiser; founder of Donaldson's Hospital
- James Donaldson (rugby league) (born 1991), English rugby league player
- James Donaldson (cricketer) (1943–2025), English cricketer
- James A. Donaldson (1941–2019), American mathematician
- James Lowry Donaldson (1814–1885), American soldier and author
- Jamie Donaldson (born 1975), Welsh golfer
- Jim Donaldson (footballer), Scottish footballer
- Jim Donaldson (rugby union), Irish international rugby union player
- MrBeast (James Stephen "Jimmy" Donaldson, born 1998), American YouTuber

== See also ==
- Donaldson Group, formerly James Donaldson & Sons, a Scottish timber supplier
