= Kenduli Sasan =

Village in Odisha, India

- town
- Nickname: Jayadeva Kenduli
- Location in Odisha, India Kenduli Sasan (India)
- Coordinates: 20.13°N 85.60°E
- Country: India
- State: Odisha
- District: Khordha

Languages
  - Official: Odia
- Time zone: UTC+5:30 (IST)
- Vehicle registration: OD
- Website: odisha.gov.in

Kenduli Sasan or Jayadeva Kenduli is a village on the banks of the Prachi River in the Khordha district of Odisha, India. Located near Puri, it is believed to be the Kenduvilva of medieval Indian literature, the birthplace of the poet Jayadeva, an issue that is still debated by scholars.

== Location ==
Kenduli Sasan is a village in the banks of the Prachi river in Khordha district. It is only a few kilometers way from the holy city of Puri in Odisha, the seat of worship of the Hindu deity Jagannath. It has recently been well-recognised as the birthplace of the well-known Sanskrit poet and lyricist, Jayadeva.

== History ==
Kenduli Sasan has recently been identified as Kenduvilva, the birthplace of Jayadeva. It is also where the poet spent his childhood, with his parents, Bhojadeva and Vamavati. Being called a Sasana (which in ancient Odisha referred to a seat of Brahmin learning), this village appears to have been a centre for Hindu literature during the 10th and 11th centuries. Jayadeva himself refers to his birthplace in the seventh song of the Gita Govinda as Kenduvilva, located by the sea:

Kinduvilva samudra sambhava Rohini ramanena

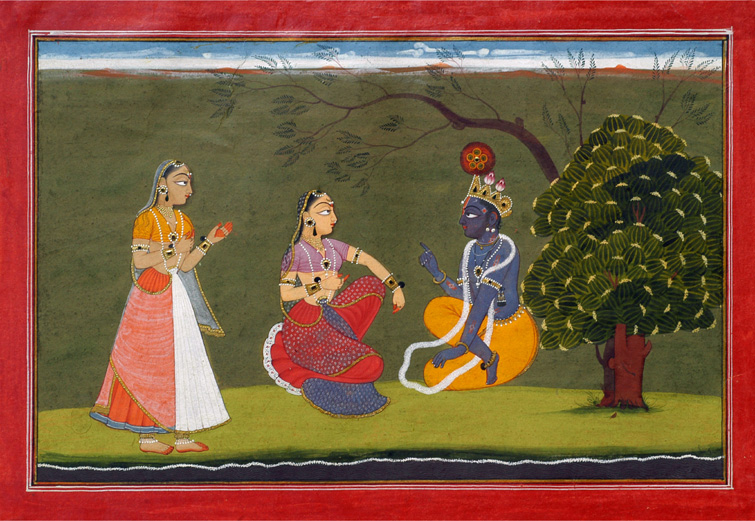
Basohli painting (c. 1730 AD) depicting a scene from Jayadeva's Gita Govinda.

Prachi valley has a long history of worshipping Madhava, another name for Krishna. During Jayadeva's period, it was known as a religious place dominated by Vaishnava Brahmins. Even today, the village of Kenduli Sasana is replete with images of Madhava. This indicates that the great poet must have been influenced by the devotional milieu in that area when he composed his magnum opus, the Gita Govinda.

== Tourism ==
Kenduli Sasan has several brick temples and sculptures dating back to the time of Jayadeva in the tenth and eleventh centuries A.D., including those of deities Bhairava, Madhava, Ambika, Jageswari. Of significance is an image with heavy matted hair, and both arms broken, which is revered by the local people as the sage 'Jayadeva'. There is also a nearby temple with an image of Nrusimha carrying Lakshmi on his lap, one of the peculiarities of the Ganga dynasty. In fact, several such temples belonging to Jayadeva's period have also been excavated here by the Archaeological Survey of India.

The Jayadeva Sanskrutika Parishad, a cultural organization, has established a museum here containing images and other archaeological relics excavated here. An annual cultural function in honor of the poet Jayadeva is organized at Kenduli.

== Controversy ==
There is a controversy surrounding the birthplace of the poet Jayadeva, with a section of historians claiming that Jaydev Kenduli in Birbhum district, West Bengal is in fact the birthplace of Jayadeva.

== See also ==
- Gita Govinda (Love Song of the Dark Lord), Jayadeva's best known poem
- Sanskrit literature
- Odissi
- Jagannath
