= David Donaldson =

David or Dave Donaldson may refer to:

- Dave Donaldson (Australian footballer) (born 1933), Australian rules footballer
- Dave Donaldson (economist) (born 1978), Canadian economist, winner of John Bates Clark Medal
- Dave Donaldson (footballer, born 1911) (1911–1974), English football player with Grimsby Town and York City
- Dave Donaldson (footballer, born 1941) (1941–2022), English football player with Wimbledon
- Dave Donaldson (footballer, born 1954), English football player with Millwall and Cambridge United
- David Donaldson (artist) (1916–1996), Scottish artist, Painter and Limner to Her Majesty the Queen
- David Donaldson (composer) (born 1960), New Zealand composer and performer
- Dave Donaldson (football player) (born 1972) Canadian Football League playing career from 1997 to 2006, CFL official 2011-2014
