= Jaydev Kenduli =

Jaydev Kenduli Kendubillo
- Village
- Location in West Bengal, India Jaydev Kenduli (India)
- Coordinates: 23.63°N 87.43°E
- Country: India
- State: West Bengal
- District: Birbhum
- Elevation: 48 m (157 ft)

Population (2001)
  - Total: 2,755

Languages
  - Official: Bengali, English
- Time zone: UTC+5:30 (IST)
- Lok Sabha constituency: Bhirbhum
- Vidhan Sabha constituency: Bolpur
- Website: birbhum.nic.in

Jaydev Kenduli is a village and gram panchayat in Illambazar community development block in Bolpur subdivision of Birbhum District in the Indian state of West Bengal. It is believed to be the birthplace of Jayadeva, an issue that is still debated by scholars. It has developed as a religious centre with many temples and ashramas (hermitages). An annual fair, popular as baul fair, is organized on the occasion of Makar Sankranti.

== History ==
Jaydev Kenduli has long been considered as a possible birthplace of the poet Jayadeva, who had composed Gita Govinda in Sanskrit. However, the poet may also have been born in another place in Odisha bearing the same name, Kenduli Sasan.

He was believed to be the court poet of Lakshmana Sena, who ruled in the 12th–13th century. It can, therefore, be presumed that the Jayadeva mela at Kendubilva has been continuing for 800 years. This is probably one of the oldest religious melas that has a recorded past. The image of Radhamadhav set up by him is daily worshipped. The asana (mat) on which the poet sat and obtained siddhi (salvation) through meditation is carefully preserved.

During the Mughal era Jaydev Kenduli was part of Senpahari pargana. As per a firman issued by Aurangzeb in the 17th century, Senpahari was added to the property of Krishnaram Rai of Bardhaman Raj. Maharani Brajakishori of Bardhaman had set up temples in different places such as Puri and Vrindaban. Jugal Kishore Mukhopadhyay of Jaydev Kenduli was then court-poet at Bardhaman. It is said that it was at his request that the Maharani set up the Radhabinod temple at Jaydev Kenduli in 1683. The temple stands where the house of the poet Jayadeva, was believed locally to have stood, based on the prior assumption of his birth there.

Around 1860-70, Radharaman Brajabasi of the Nirbak Vaisnava sect set up the Nirbak Ashrama at Jaydev Kenduli, the place of birth of their kula guru (patron saint) of the sect, the poet Jayadeva. In the first half of the 20th century, the Radhaballav temple of the Mukhopadhyay family was established. Many more ashramas (hermitages) were set up and thus Jaydev Kenduli developed as a religious centre.

== Geography ==
Cities and towns in Bolpur subdivision of Birbhum district
M: municipal city/ town, CT: census town, R: rural/ urban centre, U: University.
Owing to space constraints in the small map, the actual locations in a larger map may vary slightly

=== Location ===
Jaydev Kenduli is located at 23.63°N 87.43°E. It has an average elevation of 48 metres (157 ft). It is located on the banks of Ajay River.

Note: The map alongside presents some of the notable locations in the area. All places marked in the map are linked in the larger full screen map.

Villages in Jaydev Kenduli panchayat are: Joydev Kenduli, Tikarbeta, Sahapur, Janubazar, Raghunathpur, Mundira, Balarpur, Santoshpur, Bhubanaswer, Sugarh, Chhata Chak, and Akamba.

On the densely forested southern bank of the Ajay, a little down-stream from Jaydev Kenduli, which is located on the northern bank of the river, is Gourangapur, associated with Ichhai Ghosh, a renowned regional power in the 11th century.

== Demographics ==
In the 2001 census, Jaydev Kenduli village had a population of 2,755, of whom 976 belonged to scheduled castes.

== Culture ==
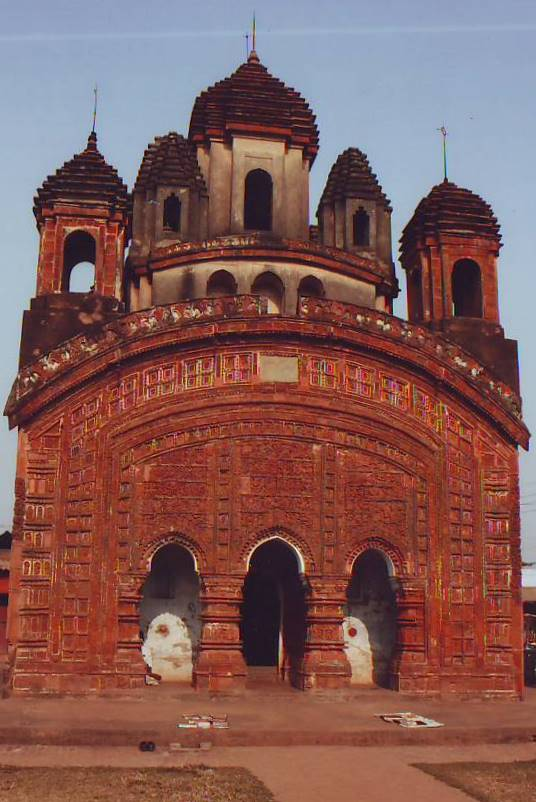
Radhabinode Temple, a navaratna temple with nine turrets

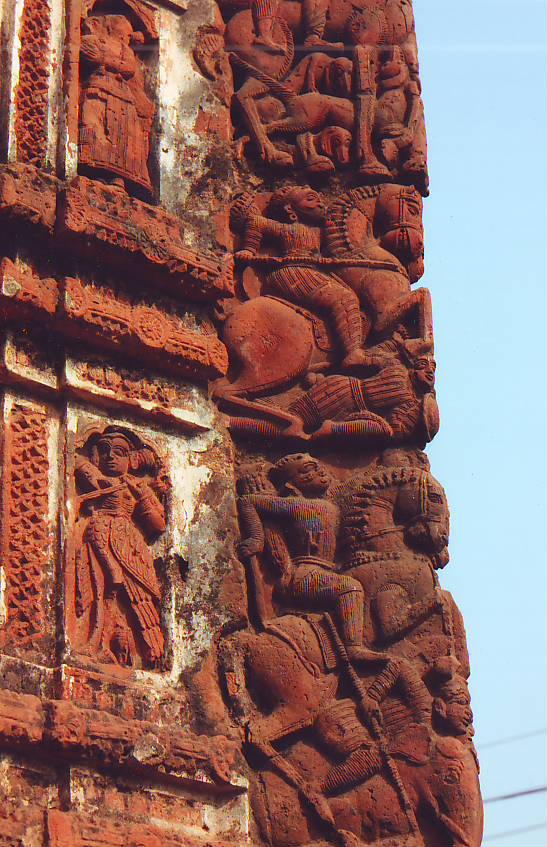
Details of terracotta carving in Radhabinode Temple

=== Terracotta carvings ===
The Radhabinode temple has exquisite terracotta carvings, some depicting Ramayana scenes.

=== Fair ===
A fair is organized in memory of Jayadeva on the occasion of Poush Sankranti or Makar Sankranti. It starts on the last day of the Bengali calendar month, Poush and continues up to 2 Magh. The start of the fair commemorates the auspicious day on which Jayadeva is claimed to have taken a bath at the Kadaambokhandi ghat of the Ajay river at Jaydev Kenduli. In 1982, the district authorities took control of the fair to provide a better environment, a good sanitation system, drinking water, lighting and security.

Several thousand bauls, a community of wandering minstrels who sing devotional songs to the music of the ektara (one stringed instrument), assemble for the fair and as such it is also referred to as Baul Fair. The bauls stay in 160 temporary hermitages at Jaydev Kenduli for around a month. These bauls appear to have inherited the legacy of Jayadeva songs.

However, in recent years, the greatest baul fair in the state is gradually losing its character, as the bauls have been outnumbered by kirtanias, who perform in the mela to gain popularity. In 2008, around 2,000 kirtanias came to attend the mela and they obtained contracts worth Rs. 20 million.

It is not known whether Rabindranath Tagore ever visited Jaydev Kenduli. However, many personalities linked with Santiniketan such as Kshiti Mohan Sen, Nandalal Bose, Provat Kumar Mukhopadhyay, Ramkinkar Baij, and Santideb Ghosh visited Jaydev Kenduli and contributed substantially towards the spread of its name outside Birbhum and added to its fame.

The fair, which is believed by some to have been there for around centuries, caters primarily to the requirements of village folk. Everything from cooking utensils to fishing nets are sold in the fair.

== See also ==
- Poush Mela
- Kenduli Sasan
