= Jayadeva =

Vaishnava Sanskrit poet (c. 1170–1245)

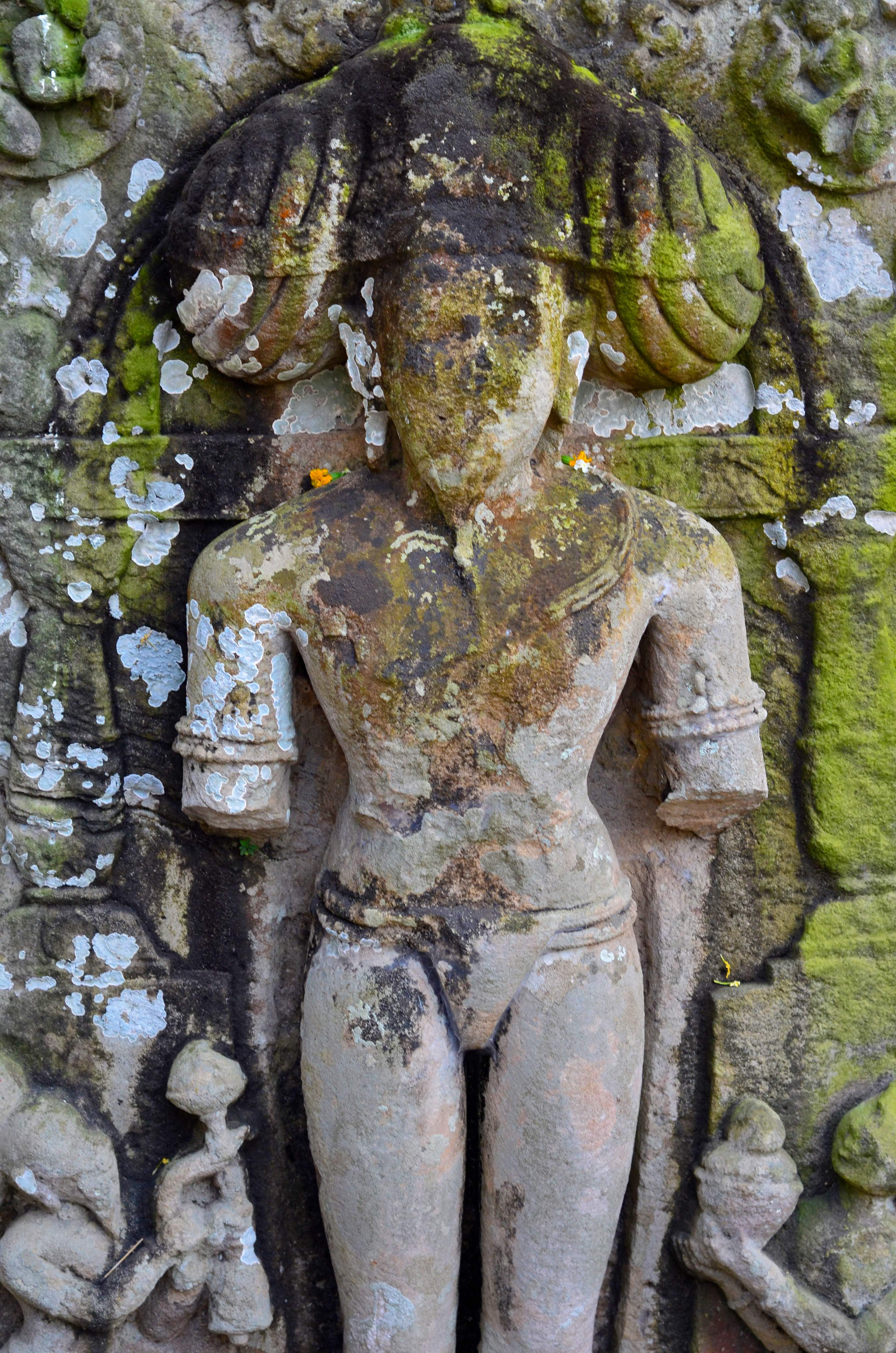
- Stone idol of Jayadeva at Akhandaleshwara Temple, Prataparudrapura, Odisha, India

Personal life
- Born: c. 1170 East India (see Jayadeva birth controversy)
- Died: c. 1245
- Notable work: Gita Govinda

Religious life
- Religion: Hinduism
- Philosophy: Vaishnava

Jayadeva (Sanskrit: जयदेव, romanized: Jayadēva, pronounced [dʑɐjɐˈdeːʋɐ]; born c. 1170 CE), also spelt Jayadev, Jaydeva, Jaydev, Jaideva and Jaidev; was a Sanskrit poet during the 12th century. He is most known for his epic poem Gita Govinda which concentrates on Krishna's love with the gopi, Radha, in a rite of spring. This poem, which presents the view that Radha is greater than Krishna, is considered an important text in the Bhakti movement of Hinduism.

Little is known of his life, except that he was a loner poet and a Hindu mendicant celebrated for his poetic genius in eastern India. Jayadeva is the earliest dated author of hymns that are included in the Guru Granth Sahib, the primary scripture of Sikhism – a religion founded in the Indian subcontinent centuries after his death.

== Biography ==
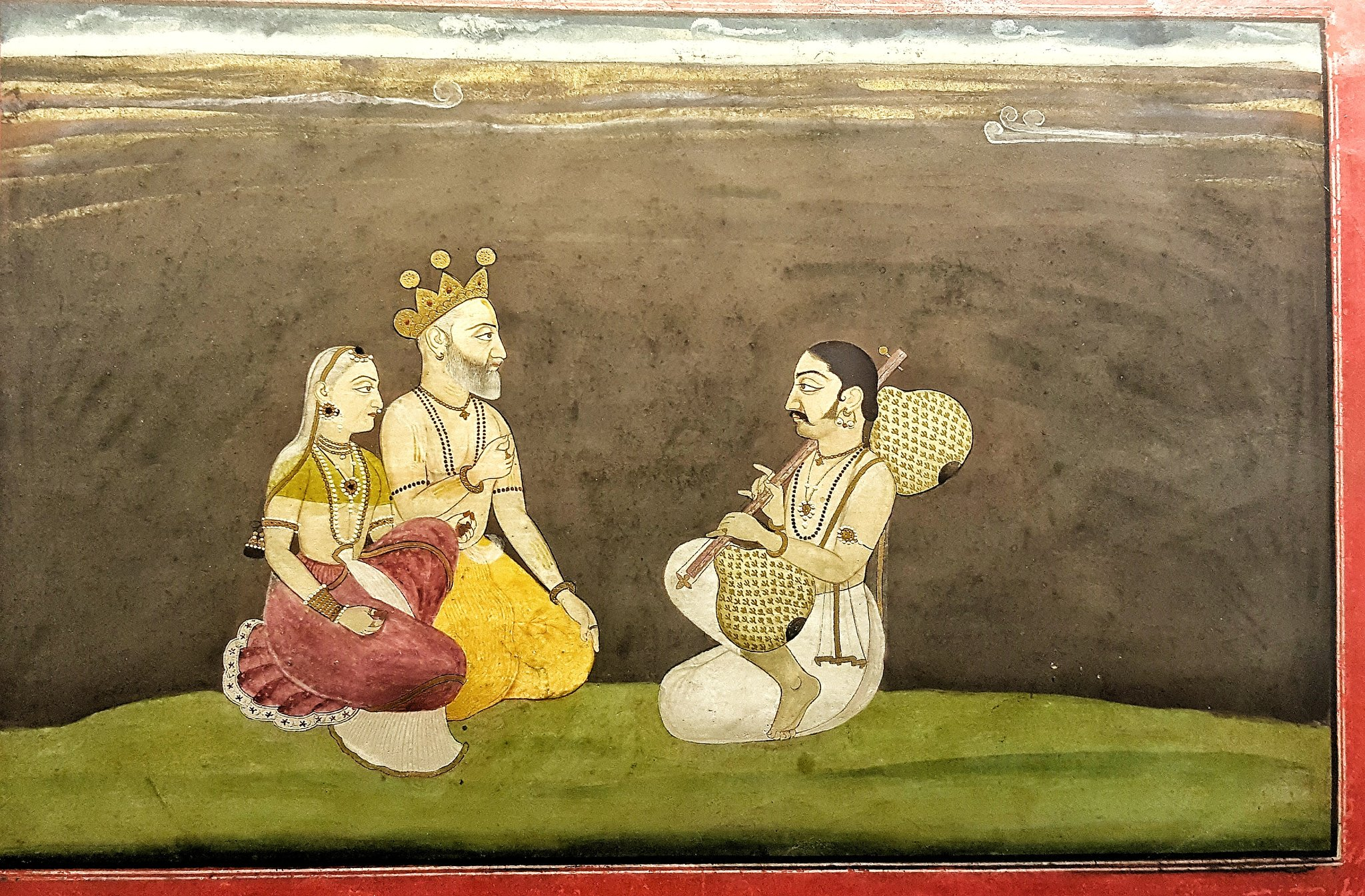
Jayadeva with his parents, by the artist Manaku of Guler

He was born in a Brahmin family but the date and place of Jayadeva's birth is uncertain. The Gitagovinda suggests that he was born in the "Kindubilva" village. Scholars have variously identified this place with a present-day village in their own region, including Kenduli Sasan near Puri in Odisha, Jaydev Kenduli in Birbhum district in West Bengal, and the village of Kenduli near Jhanjharpur in Mithila region of Bihar. Several sixteenth-century texts declare Jayadeva was from Utkala, another name of Odisha. The maximum number of Gita Govinda manuscripts are available in Odisha, in a variety of shapes and sizes, where the tradition of the Gita Govinda is an integral part of regional culture. Jayadeva, a wanderer, probably visited Puri at some point and there, according to tradition, he married a dancer named Padmavati though that is not supported by early commentators and modern scholars. The poet's parents were named Bhojadeva and Ramadevi. From temple inscriptions it is now known that Jayadeva received his education in Sanskrit poetry from a place called Kurmapataka, identified near Konark in Odisha.

=== Historical records on Jayadeva's life ===
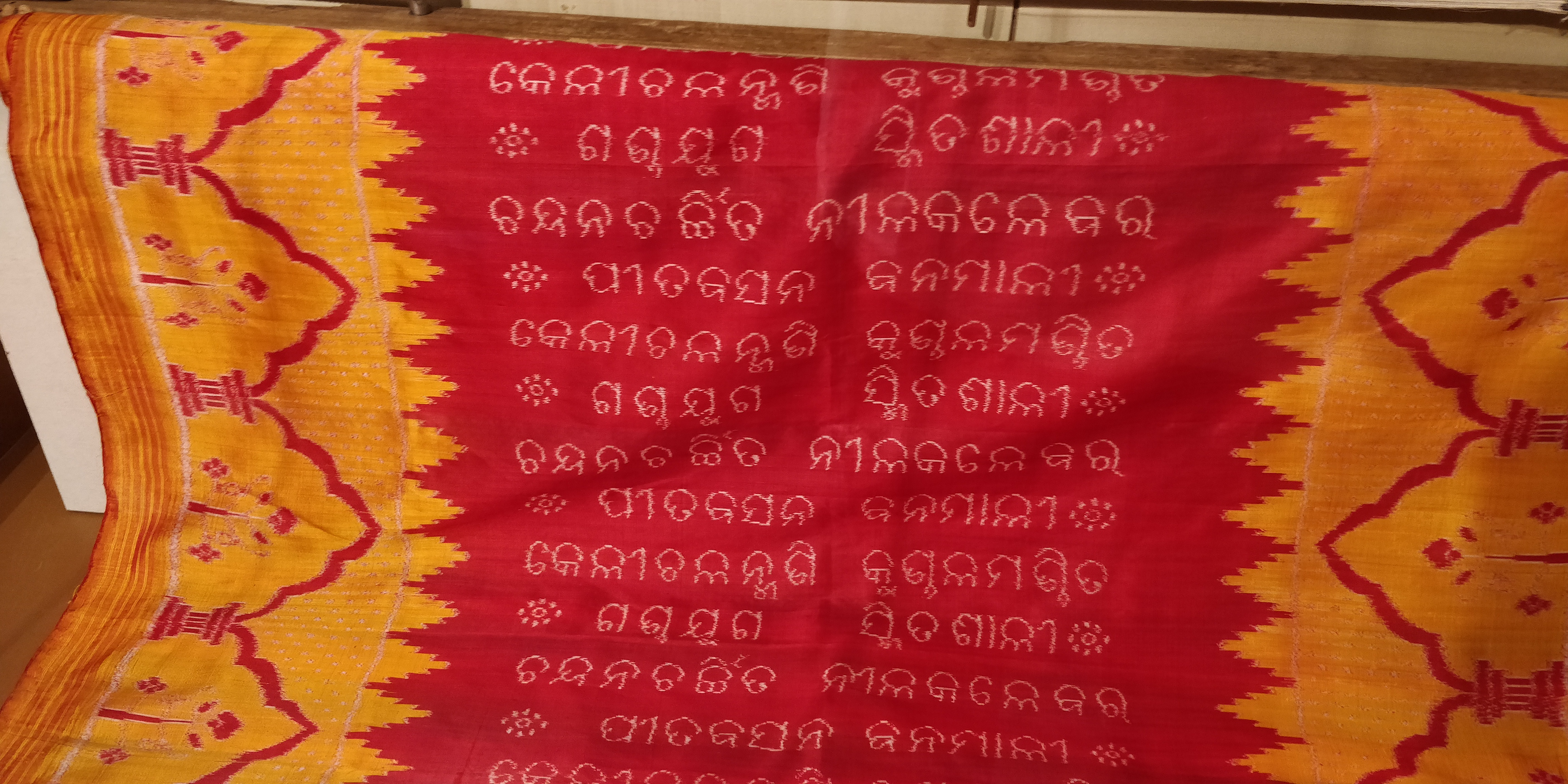
Gita Govinda Khandua or Kenduli Khandua, on which lines (here in Odia script) of the Gita Govinda are woven into the fabric

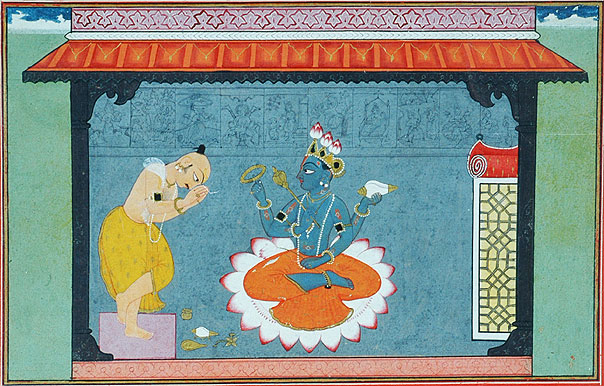
The poet Jayadeva bows to Vishnu. Gouache on paper, c. 1730.

Inscriptions at Lingaraja temple, and the more recently discovered Madhukeswara temple and Simhachala temple that were read and interpreted by Padma Shri Dr. Satyanarayana Rajguru have shed some light on Jayadeva's early life. These inscriptions narrate how Jayadeva had been a member of the teaching faculty of the school at Kurmapataka. He might have studied at Kurmapataka as well. It must have been right after his childhood education in Kenduli village that he left for Kurmapataka and gained experience in composing poetry, music and dancing.

== Literary contributions ==
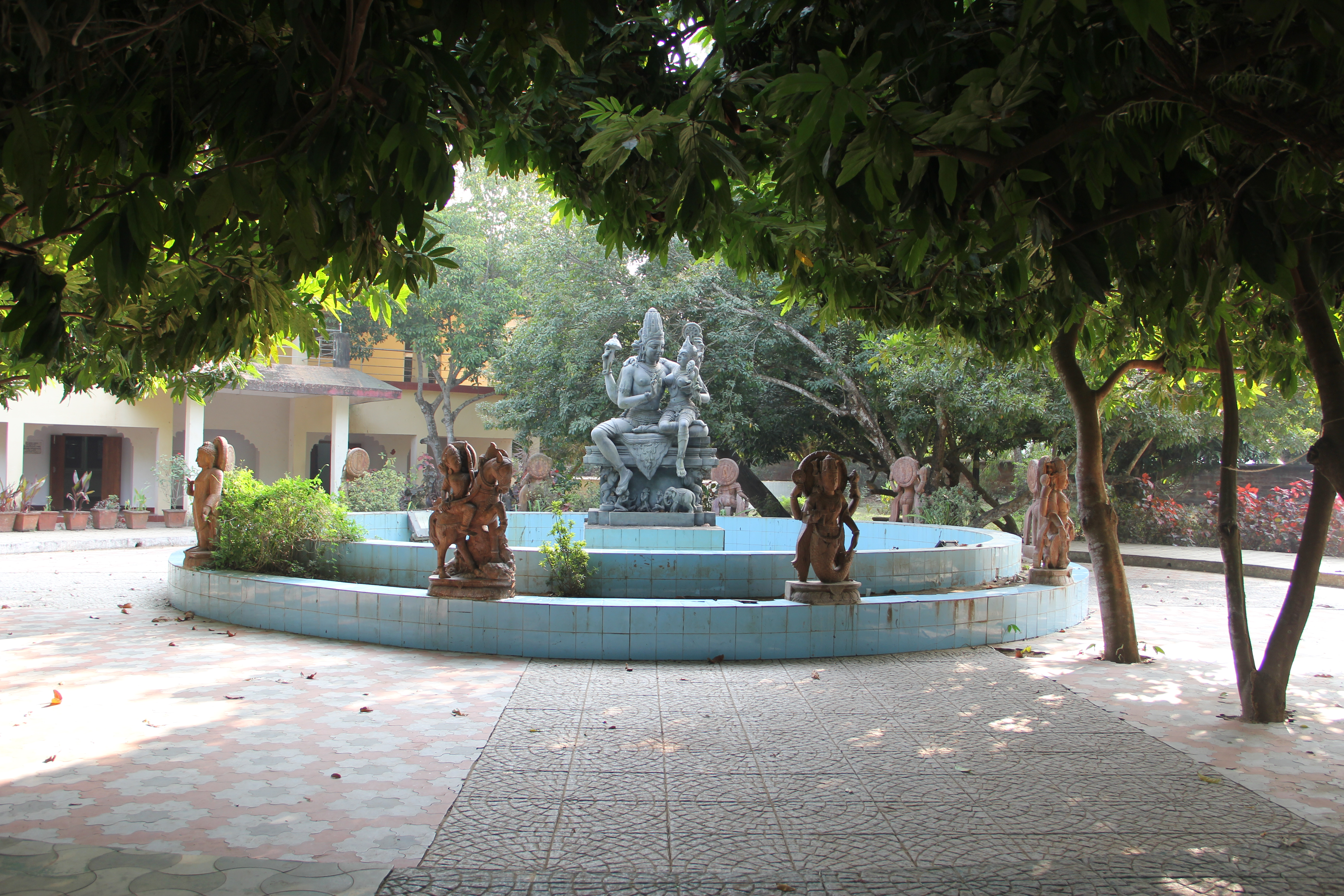
Jayadeva Pitha, Kenduli Sasan (Kendubilva), Odisha, India

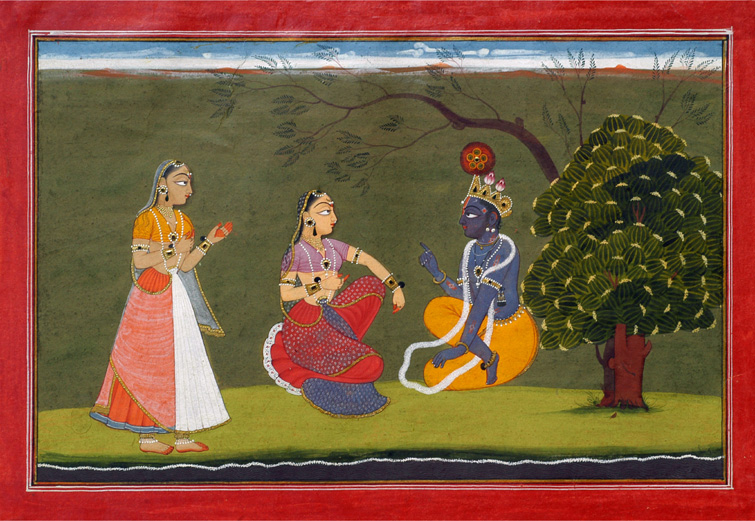
Basohli painting (c. 1730) depicting a scene from Jayadeva's Gita Govinda.

The British scholar Thomas Leverton Donaldson mentions that the Gita Govinda was known at Puri not long after its composition, for the earliest commentary on it was written in Odisha around 1190. The village of Kenduli Sasan is a location "teeming with Vaishnava ruins and temples, perhaps more than any other site in India", notes Donaldson. He also notes an upswing in Krishna images in Odishan sculpture from the late twelfth century on, "long before such images became popular in Bengal or elsewhere in India." In the Jagannatha temple of Puri, the Gita Govinda is ritually sung every night during the Badasinghara ritual from the time of Jayadeva himself. The maharis or devadasis were instructed to faithfully render and perform the Gitagovinda according to the ragas of Odissi music, as known from inscriptions. During the Badasinghara Besa, the nighttime attire, the deities wear a special kind of fabric known as the Kenduli Khandua or Gita Gobinda Khandua, in which lines of the Gita Govinda are woven into the fabric using the ikat technique. The weavers of Kenduli Sasan used to provide these fabrics and this is also a ritual in vogue from the time of the poet himself.

Odisha has a tradition of writing the Gita Govinda in different forms, like in the form of a manuscript designed to look like a fish, or one that is made as a garland made of small round pieces of palm leaf, used as a portable text for memory. Manuscripts of the Gita Govinda have been written and illustrated in Odisha in large numbers, some of them counting among the finest pieces of Indian art. Dr. Bhagyalipi Malla, curator of the manuscripts section of the Odisha State Museum, writes :

An exceptionally large number of Gitagovinda manuscripts are preserved in the Odisha State Museum, numbering two hundred and ten. These include twenty one illustrated, one hundred and eighty non-illustrated and nine manuscripts of various shapes like garland, fish and dagger. Apart from the aforesaid palm leaf manuscripts, there are several versions of the Gitagovinda written in ivory, bamboo leaf and even handmade paper. There are eighteen different commentaries preserved in the museum.

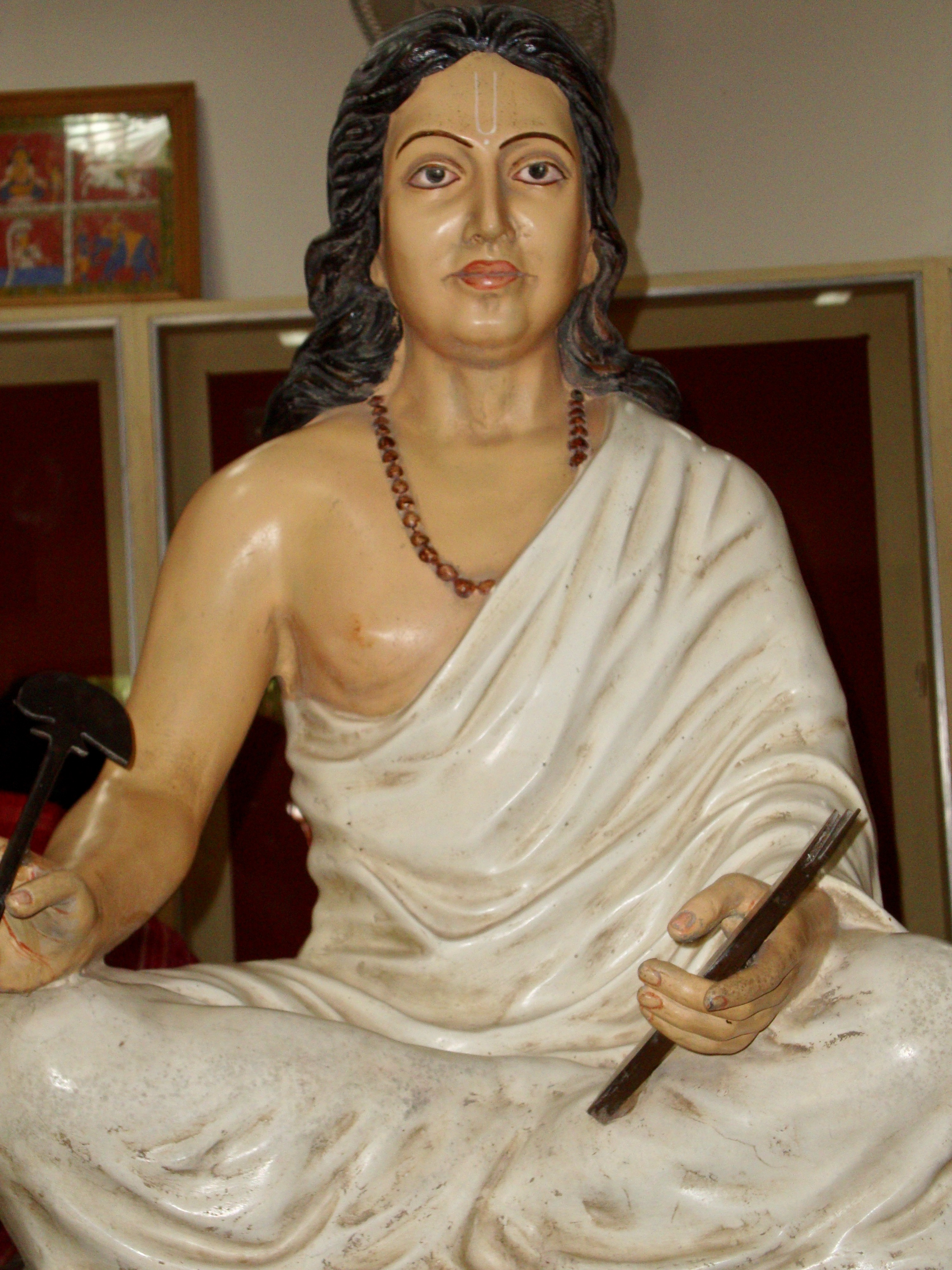
Jayadeva's idol at Kenduli Sasan (Kendubilva), Odisha, India

Even today, traditional craftsmen and scribes come together in Odisha to finely stitch together leaves of the palm at one end for the manuscript to open up and fall like a chart made up of folios, on which the text of the Gita Govinda is written, complete with illustrations.

A few poems of Jayadeva written in archaic Odia have been published by the Directorate of Culture, Odisha. They describe the romance of Radha-Krishna and contain ideas very similar to those used in the Gita Govinda. Jayadeva is widely considered one of the earliest musicians of Odissi music. Every night during the Badasinghara or the last ritual of the Jagannatha temple of Puri, the Gitagovinda of Jayadeva is sung, set to traditional Odissi ragas & talas, such as Mangala Gujjari. This tradition has continued unbroken since the time of Jayadeva, who himself used to sing in the temple. After the time of the poet, the singing of the Gitagovinda according to the authentic Odissi ragas & talas was instated as a mandatory sēvā at the temple, to be performed by the Maharis or Devadasis, systematically recorded in inscriptions, the Madala Panji and other official documents that describe the functioning of the temple. To this date, the Jagannath temple remains the fountainhead of Odissi music and the most ancient & authentic compositions (including a few archaic Odia Chhandas and jananas by Jayadeva himself) survive in the temple tradition, although the Devadasis are no more found owing to their systematic eradication by the British colonial régime.

Two hymns of Jayadeva, have been incorporated in the Guru Granth Sahib, the holy book of Sikhism.

The hymns are written in a mixture of Sanskrit and eastern Apabhraṃśa (i.e., Apabhraṣṭa). There are records narrating how Jayadeva's work had a profound influence on Guru Nanak (first Sikh guru) during his visit to Puri.

== See also ==
- Odissi music
- Bhagat Jayadeva Hymns in Guru Granth Sahib
- Sanskrit literature
- Bhakta Jayadeva, 1938 and 1961 Telugu language films
- Kavi Joydev, a 1941 Bengali film about Jayadeva by Hiren Bose
