= Stewart Milne =

Scottish businessman (born 1950)

Stewart Milne CBE
- Born: 23 July 1950 (age 76); Torphins, Aberdeenshire, Scotland
- Known for: Chairman of Aberdeen F.C. (1998 - 2019)

Stewart Milne CBE, DBA (honoris causa), DTech (honoris causa) (born 23 July 1950) is a Scottish businessman and former football club chairman, from Alford, Aberdeenshire.

Milne is a major shareholder in Aberdeen F.C., and joined the club's board of directors in 1994 to replace Dick Donald, subsequently becoming chairman in 1998. In November 2019, shortly after opening a new training facility on the western outskirts of the city, he announced that he would be stepping down as chairman.

He has an honorary doctorate in business administration from Robert Gordon University (December 2000), and an honorary doctorate of technology from Edinburgh Napier University (November 2007), and an honorary doctorate from Heriot-Watt University, in recognition of his outstanding entrepreneurial contribution to the housebuilding, construction and property development industry and to the Scottish economy, also for services to higher education in Scotland. He earned the 2005 Scottish Entrepreneur of the Year award. In the 2008 New Year Honours, he was awarded a CBE for services to the housebuilding industry in Scotland.

== Stewart Milne Group ==
Milne founded the Aberdeen-based Stewart Milne Construction Group, a housebuilding contractor, in 1975. He started off his business renovating bathrooms.

Stewart Milne Group sold its timber frame manufacturing subsidiary to Fife-based James Donaldson & Sons (later Donaldson Group) in 2021. In April 2022, the group announced that the housebuilding business was up for sale. In January 2024, the Scottish housebuilding business went into administration with the loss of 217 jobs, due to "the slump in the oil-linked property market around Aberdeen and the firm's hesitance to buy land during Covid". The group's English subsidiary, Manchester-based Stewart Milne Homes North West England (Developments) Ltd, also went into administration, on 12 January 2023, with Homes England set to lose up to £9.2m as a result. The group collapsed owing suppliers and subcontractors £153m.
