= Sharan (poet) =

12th century Sanskrit poet

Sharan was a Sanskrit poet of the 12th century AD from Bengal. He was among five gems at the court of Lakshmana Sena.

== Biography ==
Jayadeva described Sharan among his contemporaries and praised his poetry. No major work of Sharan was discovered.

Sharan was mentioned in Saduktikarnamrta of Shridhar Das who was a governor under Lakshmana Sena and in the padavali of Rupa Goswami. It is believed that, Sharan's another names were Sharan Datta and Chirantana Sharan. It is also believed that he wrote Durghatavrtti.
