= Donaldson (disambiguation) =

Donaldson is a surname.

Donaldson may also refer to:

== Places in the United States ==
- Donaldson, Arkansas, a town in Hot Spring County
- Donaldson, Indiana, an unincorporated town in West Township, Marshall County
- Donaldson, Kentucky
- Donaldson, Michigan, an unincorporated community
- Donaldson, Minnesota, a city in Kittson County
- Donaldson, Pennsylvania, a census-designated place in Schuylkill County
- Donaldson, Hampshire County, West Virginia, an unincorporated community
- Donaldson, Webster County, West Virginia
- Donaldson Air Force Base, a closed facility of the United States Air Force
- Donaldson Center Airport, a public airport south of Greenville, South Carolina
- Donaldson Mountain, in Franklin County, New York
- Donaldson Run, a stream in Arlington County, Virginia

== Businesses ==
- Donaldson Company, a U.S. filtration solutions company founded in 1915
- Donaldson, Lufkin & Jenrette, a U.S. investment bank founded in 1959
- Donaldson and Meier, an architectural firm based in Detroit, Michigan
- Donaldson, Moir and Paterson, a Scottish rock group originally formed in 1985
- Donaldson International Airways, a British charter airline from 1968 to 1974
- Donaldson's, a defunct department store company in Minneapolis, Minnesota, USA

== Other uses ==
- Donaldson Brown (1885–1965), financial executive and corporate director with DuPont and General Motors Corporation
- USS Donaldson, three ships of the United States Navy have been named Donaldson

== See also ==
- Donaldson's College, Linlithgow, Scotland
- O'Connor v. Donaldson, 422 U.S. 563 (1975), a landmark decision in mental health law
