= John P. Donaldson =

- Born: August 14, 1842; Butler, Pennsylvania, US
- Died: January 7, 1920 (aged 77); Floris, Iowa, US
- Burial place: Mars Hill Cemetery
- Military career
- Allegiance: United States of America
- Branch: United States Army
- Rank: Sergeant
- Unit: 4th Pennsylvania Cavalry
- Conflicts: Battle of Appomattox Courthouse
- Awards: Medal of Honor

John P. Donaldson (August 14, 1842 – January 7, 1920) was an American soldier who fought in the American Civil War. Donaldson received the United States' highest award for bravery during combat, the Medal of Honor, for his action during the Battle of Appomattox Courthouse in Virginia on April 9, 1865. He was honored with the award on May 3, 1865.

== Biography ==
Donaldson was born in Butler, Pennsylvania on August 14, 1842. He enlisted into the 4th Pennsylvania Cavalry. He died on January 7, 1920, and his remains are interred at Mars Hill Cemetery in Ottumwa, Iowa.

== Medal of Honor citation ==
Capture of flag of 4th Virginia Cavalry (Confederate States of America).

== See also ==
- List of American Civil War Medal of Honor recipients: A–F
