= Jeff Donaldson =

Jeff (or Jeffrey or Jeffery) Donaldson may refer to:

- Jeff Donaldson (American football) (born 1962), former American football defensive back
- Jeff Donaldson (artist) (1932–2004), American visual artist
- Jeffery Donaldson, Canadian poet and critic
- Jeffrey Donaldson (born 1962), Northern Irish politician
