= William Donaldson (disambiguation) =

William Donaldson (1935–2005) was a British theatrical producer, satirist, writer and playboy.

William or Bill Donaldson may also refer to:

- William Donaldson (died 1813), English-born American founder of Donaldsonville, Louisiana
- William H. Donaldson (1931–2024), American businessman, chairman of the U.S. Securities and Exchange Commission
- William John Donaldson (born 1958), chess player
- William L. Donaldson (1899–1977), American politician
- John William Donaldson (1811–1861), English philologist and biblical critic
- William Donaldson (cricketer) (1871–1923), Scottish cricketer for Oxford University
- Bill Donaldson (cricketer) (1923–1999), Australian cricketer
- Willie Donaldson (footballer) (1920–1977), Scottish footballer
- Bill Donaldson (rugby union) (1871–1923), Scottish rugby union player
