= Dave Donaldson (footballer, born 1911) =

English footballer

Personal information
- Full name: David Edwin Donaldson
- Date of birth: 28 February 1911
- Place of birth: Selby, England
- Date of death: 10 February 1974 (aged 62)
- Position: Winger

Senior career*
Years	Team	Apps	(Gls)
1930–1931	Selby Town		
1931–1932	Grimsby Town	1	(0)
1932–1933	York City	18	(1)
1933–1934	Yeovil & Petters United		
1934–193?	Boston United		
- * Club domestic league appearances and goals

David Edwin Donaldson (28 February 1911 – 10 February 1974) was an English professional footballer who played as a winger.
