= William Donaldson (cricketer) =

Scottish cricketer (1871–1923)

William Patrick Donaldson (4 March 1871 – 27 March 1923) was a Scottish first-class cricketer active 1894 who played for Oxford University. He was born in Glasgow and died in Dollar, Clackmannanshire. He appeared in one first-class match.
