= Dave Donaldson (Australian footballer) =

Australian rules footballer

Personal information
- Full name: David Samuel Donaldson
- Born: 16 December 1933
- Died: 6 June 2002 (aged 68)
- Height: 175 cm (5 ft 9 in)
- Weight: 73 kg (161 lb)

Playing career^{1}
| Years | Club | Games (Goals) |
| 1953–54 | South Melbourne | 6 (0) |
- ^{1} Playing statistics correct to the end of 1954.

David Samuel Donaldson (16 December 1933 – 6 June 2002) was an Australian rules footballer who played with South Melbourne in the Victorian Football League (VFL).
