= Walter Donaldson =

Walter Donaldson may refer to:

- Walter Donaldson (snooker player), (1907–1973) Scottish snooker player
- Walter Donaldson (songwriter), (1893–1947) American songwriter
