= Alexander Donaldson =

Alexander Donaldson may refer to:

- Alex Donaldson (1890–?), Scottish footballer
- Alex Donaldson (footballer, born 1893), Scottish footballer
- Alexander Donaldson (bookseller) (c. 1727–1794), publisher of the Edinburgh Advertiser newspaper

== See also ==
- Stuart Alexander Donaldson (1854–1915), first Premier of the Colony of New South Wales
