= Donaldson Group =

British timber company

Premises outside Buckhaven, Fife

Donaldson Group (formerly James Donaldson & Sons) is a British family-owned timber merchant.

== History ==
The firm was founded in 1860.

In 2020, the sixth generation of the Donaldson family took over operation of the firm. In January 2021, the firm launched Buzz Home Office, a business providing made-to-measure home office furniture. In June 2021, the firm acquired Kitchens International. In December 2021, the firm acquired Stewart Milne Timber Systems, a subsidiary of the Stewart Milne Group.

The business was rebranded to Donaldson Group in 2022.

== Operations ==
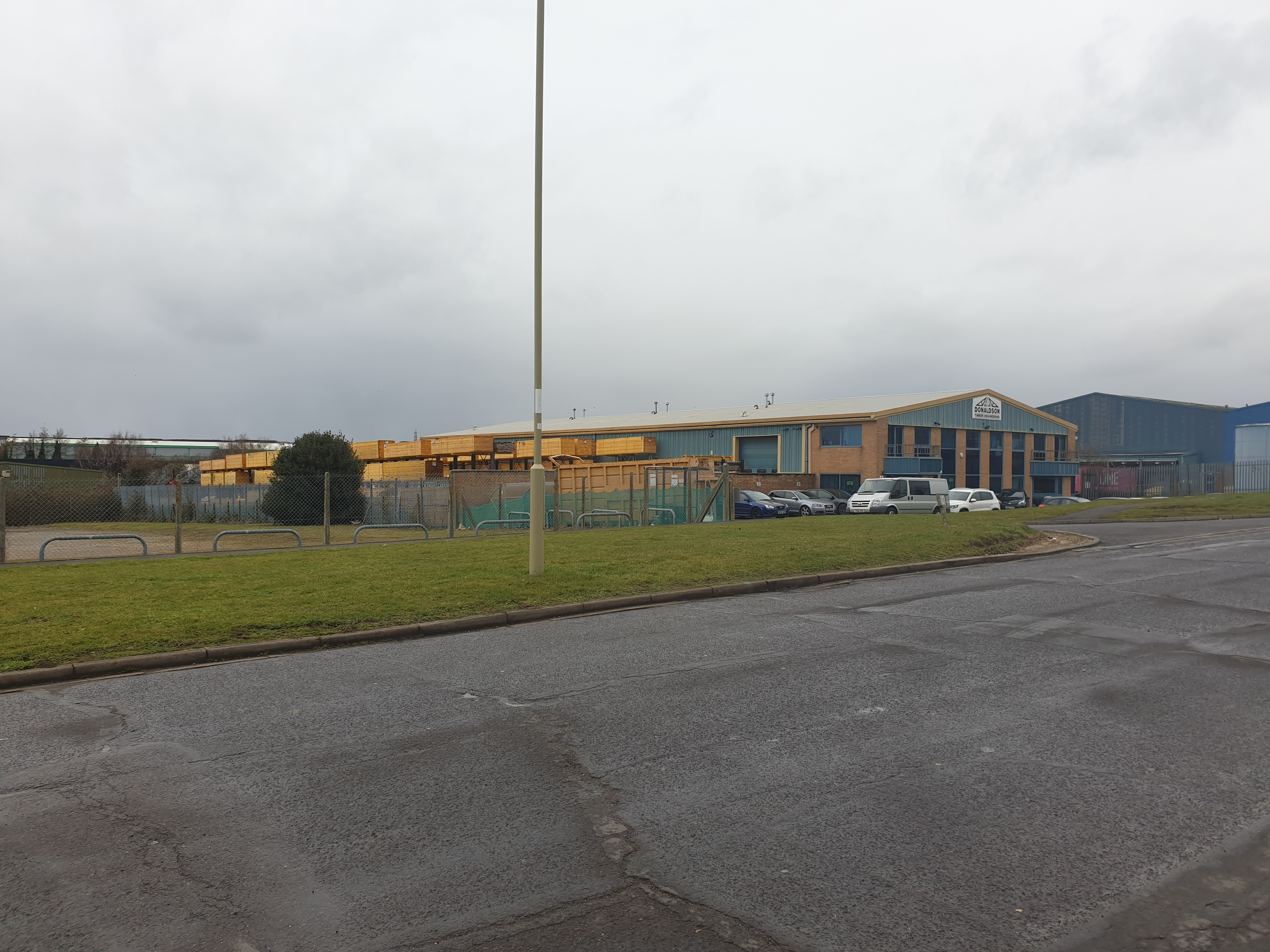
Branch in Andover, Hampshire

The firm is based in Glenrothes, Fife. It currently has 31 locations around the UK. Former locations include a sawmill in Wemyss, the land for which was sold to Sainsbury's in the late 1990s.

== Subsidiaries ==
- Buzz Home Office
- Donaldson Timber Engineering
- MGM Timber
