= Jack Donaldson (footballer) =

Australian rules footballer

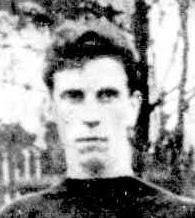

Personal information
- Full name: John Donaldson
- Born: 25 April 1880; Ballarat East, Victoria
- Died: 25 October 1934 (aged 54); Malvern East, Victoria
- Original team: Heyfield

Playing career^{1}
Years	Club	Games (Goals)
1908	Melbourne	9 (3)
- ^{1} Playing statistics correct to the end of 1908.

Jack Donaldson (25 April 1880 – 25 October 1934) was an Australian rules footballer who played with Melbourne in the Victorian Football League (VFL).
