= Peter Donaldson =

Peter Donaldson may refer to:

- Peter Donaldson (newsreader) (1945–2015), British radio announcer and newsreader
- Pete Donaldson (born 1981), radio and TV presenter
- Peter Donaldson (actor) (1953–2011), Canadian actor
- Peter Donaldson (economist) (1934–2002), British economist, academic, author, and radio and television broadcaster
- Peter S. Donaldson, American Shakespeare scholar
