= Gordon Graham Donaldson =

Captain and Lieutenant-Colonel Gordon Graham Donaldson was a senior officer in the British Army who died as a result of an illness contracted during the disastrous Walcheren Campaign in 1809.

He was commissioned in the 1st Foot Guards (the Grenadier Guards) as an ensign on 23 October 1793, after serving in the 57th Regiment of Foot in the same rank since 24 February 1791. He was promoted to the regimental rank of lieutenant (and dual army rank of captain) on 23 September 1795 and to the rank of captain and lieutenant colonel on 8 November 1804. He served with the 1st Battalion of his regiment in the Peninsula War from October 1808 to January 1809 and was present at the Battle of Corunna. There was a memorial to him in the Guards Officers Memorial at the Royal Military Chapel, Wellington Barracks, but it was destroyed in German aerial bombing in 1944. A second memorial is in the chancel of St Nicholas' Church in Harwich, Essex, where he is also buried under a headstone in the churchyard.

== Family ==
His eldest daughter, Eliza-Ann, married William Wright Esq, of Euston Hall, Sudbury, in 1827.
