= Robert Donaldson =

Robert Donaldson may refer to:

- Robert Donaldson (political scientist) (born 1943), American political scientist and president of the University of Tulsa
- Robert Donaldson (politician) (1851–1936), member of the New South Wales Legislative Assembly
- Robert Donaldson Jr. (1800–1872), American banker and patron of the arts
- Robert Douglas Donaldson (1870–1964), Canadian builder
- Robert Scott Donaldson, Canadian politician
- Bob Donaldson (1868–1947), Scottish footballer
- Bob Donaldson (cyclist) (born 2002), British cyclist
