= John Donaldson (author) =

British author and poet

John Donaldson (1921?–1989), also known as Jon Inglis, was a British author and poet most particularly associated in later life with Oxford, England.

== Life ==
Jon Inglis was born into poverty in Newcastle, probably in 1920–21, and was sent to an orphanage at the age of five when his mother who neglected the children in favour of living a life of a single women and alcohol dependent, could no longer cope with the children and his disabled sibling and abandoned them. At the Barnardo's orphanage, he experienced cold, hunger and abuse, he ran away to become the challenger in a mobile boxing booth.

He joined the Pioneer Corps at outbreak of World War II and was captured by the Germans during the retreat to Dunkirk; in consequence he spent the whole war in prison camps. Escaping many times only to be caught again and returned to solitary confinement where he began writing poetry. He later novelised his early life under the title Forever Endeavour.

After the war, he became a successful and respected wealthy businessman Suddenly and without warning the 1970s he turned his back on his children, his wife and left them destitute in order to become a full-time writer. His wife, Hannalore had been working by day in order for him to write and typing all his plays and works by night in order to help him was heartbroken. He went to live in London with no possessions, spending nights on the streets or sleeping under bridges, and speaking at Hyde Park's Speaker's Corner on the insubstantial nature of power and acquisition. This period was later novelised as Season of the Butterfly, published after his death by his second wife.

Aside from the novels, John Inglis wrote a very large corpus of philosophical aphorisms, together with poems, and plays. He was a recognised figure around Oxford in his latter years The majority of his great quantity of writings are held, though still unpublished, at the Oxfordshire Archives. On his death his substantial written works although promised by John to his only daughter of his abandoned children, were kept by his second wife. Members of his family are hoping that Oxfordshire Archives will hand them to their rightful beneficiary, his daughter. Thus far his second wife has refused to give them to his daughter. The last thing he said to his Daughter prior to his death, "Forgive me, I have nothing to give you but my work it is all I am and no greater love than this to give".

He joined the Pioneer Corps at outbreak of World War II and was captured by the Germans during the retreat to Dunkirk; in consequence he spent the whole war in prison camps, where he began writing poetry. He later novelised his early life under the title Forever Endeavour.

After the war, he became a successful and respected businessman, but in the 1970s he left his home, his work and family to live in London with no possessions, spending nights on the streets or sleeping under bridges, and speaking at Hyde Park's Speaker's Corner on the insubstantial nature of power and acquisition. This period was later novelised as Season of the Butterfly, published after his death by his second wife.

Aside from the novels, John Inglis (Donaldson) wrote a very large corpus of philosophical aphorisms, together with poems, and plays. He was a recognised figure around Oxford in his latter years, and the majority of his great quantity of writings are held, though still unpublished, at the Oxfordshire Archives.

The poet Kathleen Raine wrote to John's wife:

"John Inglis was indeed a brave and remarkable man... There is real vision in his poems... I can understand what was in John's mind when he gave himself totally to seeking to bring about the only revolution that can change the world, A CHANGE OF HEART IN PEOPLE, ordinary people everywhere."
