= Thomas Donaldson (cricketer) =

English cricketer and barrister

Personal information
- Full name: Thomas Hubert Donaldson
- Born: 6 August 1882; Streatham, Surrey, England
- Died: c. 1960 (aged ~78); Johannesburg, Transvaal, South Africa
- Batting: Unknown
- Bowling: Unknown

Domestic team information
- Years: Team
- 1906: Oxford University

Career statistics
Competition	First-class
Matches	1
Runs scored	38
Batting average	38.00
100s/50s	–/–
Top score	31*
Balls bowled	18
Wickets	0
Bowling average	–
5 wickets in innings	–
10 wickets in match	–
Best bowling	–
Catches/stumpings	–/–
- Source: Cricinfo, 1 May 2020

Thomas Hubert Donaldson (6 August 1882 – c. 1960) was an English first-class cricketer and barrister.

Donaldson was born in August 1882 at Streatham. He later studied at Worcester College at the University of Oxford, where he made a single appearance in first-class cricket for Oxford University against Surrey at The Oval in 1906. Batting twice in the match, Donaldson was dismissed for 7 runs in the Oxford first innings by George Gamble, while in their second innings he was unbeaten on 31.

After graduating from Oxford, Donaldson was called to the bar as a member of the Middle Temple in November 1910. He later emigrated to South Africa, where he died at Johannesburg prior to 1960.
