= John Donaldson (footballer) =

Scottish footballer

Personal information
- Full name: John W. Donaldson
- Place of birth: Scotland
- Position(s): Right half

Senior career*
| Years | Team | Apps | (Gls) |
| 1919–1921 | Queen's Park | 33 | (2) |
- *Club domestic league appearances and goals

John W. Donaldson was a Scottish amateur footballer who played as a right half in the Scottish League for Queen's Park.

== Personal life ==
Donaldson served as a sergeant and then as a second lieutenant in the Scottish Horse during the First World War.

== Career statistics ==
Appearances and goals by club, season and competition
| Club | Season | League | | | Scottish Cup | | Other | | Total | |
| Club | Season | Division | Apps | Goals | Apps | Goals | Apps | Goals | Apps | Goals |
|---|---|---|---|---|---|---|---|---|---|---|
| Queen's Park | 1919–20 | Scottish First Division | 25 | 0 | 1 | 0 | 4 (Note: 3 appearances in Glasgow Merchants Charity Cup, 1 appearance in Glasgow Cup) | 0 | 30 | 0 |
| Queen's Park | 1920–21 | Scottish First Division | 8 | 0 | 0 | 0 | 2 (Note: 1 appearance in Glasgow Cup, 1 appearance in Glasgow Merchants Charity Cup) | 0 | 10 | 0 |
| Career total | | | 33 | 0 | 1 | 0 | 6 | 0 | 40 | 0 |
