= Mars Hill (Iowa) =

Church and cemetery in Iowa, US

- U.S. National Register of Historic Places
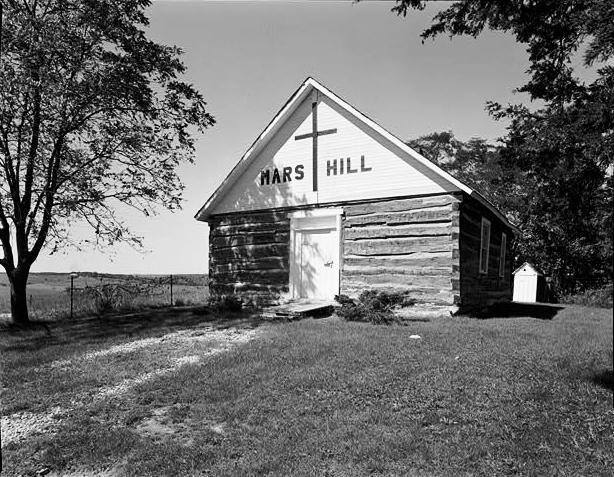
- Historic photo of the church

- Location within Iowa Location within the United States
- Location: Southeast of Ottumwa, Iowa
- Coordinates: 40°53′58″N 92°21′27″W
- Area: 1.5 acres (0.61 ha)
- Built: 1850-1857
- Architectural style: Rustic
- NRHP reference No.: 74000814
- Added to NRHP: September 13, 1974

Mars Hill is a historic church building and cemetery located near Ottumwa, Iowa, United States. Barbara Clark donated the property to the Baptist Church and the church building was built between 1850 and 1857. The rectangular structure is composed of dovetail notched hewn logs, and it is capped with a gable roof. The front door is a copy of the original. It is thought that its name comes from its location, but that cannot be substantiated. Local lore has it that the church building served as a stop on the Underground Railroad. The property was listed on the National Register of Historic Places in 1974.

A fire set by an arsonist nearly destroyed the building in 2006. After two years of fundraising and construction it was re-dedicated on June 8, 2008. Some of the original logs that were charred in the fire are still a part of the structure. It is one of the largest log buildings and one of the oldest log churches still in use in Iowa. A worship service is held in the now interdenominational church yearly in June.
