= Michael Donaldson =

Michael Donaldson may refer to:

- Michael A. Donaldson (1884–1970), United States Army sergeant
- Michael C. Donaldson (born 1939), American entertainment attorney
- Michael Donaldson (RAF officer) (born 1943), Air Vice-Marshal RAF and Commandant Royal Observer Corps
