= Donaldson Run =

River in Virginia, United States

Coordinates: 38°55′12.40″N 77°6′25.92″W

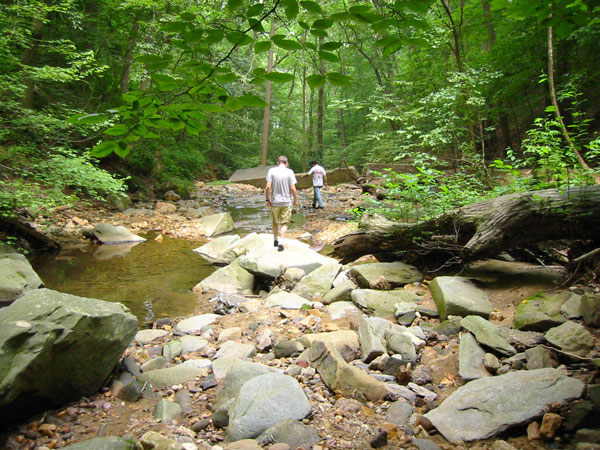

Location
- Country: United States
- Location: Arlington County, Virginia

Physical characteristics
- Mouth
  - location: Potomac River
  - elevation: 0 feet (0 m)

Donaldson Run is a stream in Arlington County, Virginia. From its source near Marymount University, Donaldson Run flows on a northeastern course and empties into the Potomac River within the federal parklands of the George Washington Memorial Parkway. Donaldson Run is surrounded predominantly by forests.

== History ==
Donaldson Run was named after Robert H. Donaldson, one of the early farm owners, along the Potomac. The land was originally settled by James Donaldson (pre-1755), then inherited by James' son, William, about the time of the Revolutionary War. William then passed the land to his son Robert. Robert Donaldson's family worked the farm through the Civil War. Robert's farm wagon carried the name "Donaldson & Sons," and the wagon was used to transport farm produce to Georgetown, an arduous trip, especially in inclement weather.

Following the outbreak of the Civil War, a ring of forts was built in the area to protect Washington from Confederate forces. During this period most of the trees in the area were felled. The effect on the landscape was devastating. Much of the topsoil washed away, resulting in disastrous erosion. One beneficial result, however, was the construction of roads (i.e. North Military Road), which greatly improved transportation.

In the late nineteenth century, this stream served as a popular swimming hole and boat landing. It was first named Rock Run in the early nineteenth century, and later renamed Swimming Landing Run. By 1900, the name of the stream had been changed to Donaldson Run.

In 1961, the Arlington County Master Plan was devised, which had provisions to pave over the upper portions of Donaldson Run to make way for an extension of Yorktown Boulevard, which would have turned those portions of the stream into a storm sewer. However, the project was not undertaken due to public concern for the environment.

In the 1960s, land to the south of Donaldson Run was set aside as parkland, and is now known as Potomac Overlook Regional Park and the James I. Mayer Center for Environmental Education.

== Parks along Donaldson Run ==
- Lee Heights Park (Arlington County Parks and Recreation)
- Zachary Taylor Park (Arlington County Parks and Recreation)
- Donaldson Run Nature Area (Arlington County Parks and Recreation)
- Potomac Overlook Regional Park (Northern Virginia Regional Park Authority) - Park opened on August 6, 1973
- George Washington Memorial Parkway (US National Park Service)

== Wildlife ==
A variety of trees grow in the forested areas along Donaldson Run, including tulip poplars, oaks, and beech. However foreign greenery such as English ivy, Japanese honeysuckle, bamboo, garlic mustard have taken over much of the native undergrowth.

In the forest along the banks of Donaldson Run, there are a number of mammal species including white-tailed deer, possums, raccoons, woodchucks, foxes, squirrels, flying squirrels, bats, shrews and moles.

== Attractions ==
- There is a well-cleared nature trail along Donaldson Run through Zachary Taylor Park with several scenic footbridges.
- There is also a hiking trail through Donaldson Run Nature Area which leads to the Potomac River, where hikers can pick up the Potomac Heritage Trail which parallels the George Washington Memorial Parkway.
- Donaldson Run flows down the Potomac Palisades, making a 30-foot drop before reaching the Potomac.
- Potomac Overlook Park (along the southern bank of the stream) has a nature center, the James I. Mayer Center for Environmental Education, and a number of exhibits featuring local wildlife and local history.

== See also ==
- List of rivers of Virginia
