= Andrew Brown Donaldson =

British artist

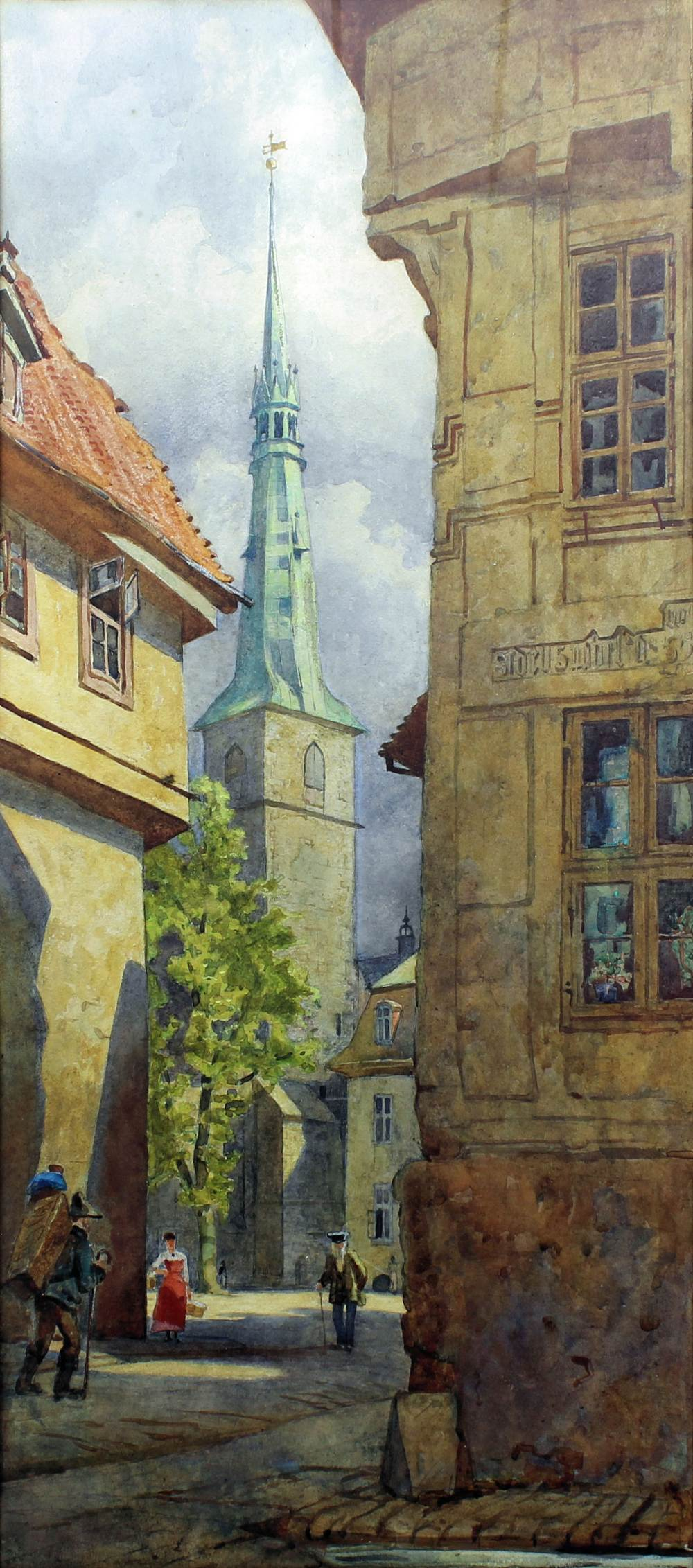
Street Scene by Andrew Brown Donaldson, in the late nineteenth century of a street scene somewhere in the Low Countries, presumably in the Netherlands

Andrew Brown Donaldson was a British artist mainly active in the second half of the nineteenth century. He was born in 1840, although some sources say 1838, and was the second son of a solicitor named William Leverton Donaldson and his wife, Margaret Tennent. As their name implies, the Donaldsons were of Scottish descent and they were perhaps best known in the nineteenth century for their prominence in the field of architecture; William Leverton Donaldson's father, James Donaldson (1756-1844), and elder brother, Thomas Leverton Donaldson (1795-1885), were both renowned architects. Margaret Tennent was the daughter of John Tennent of Glasgow and his wife, Margaret Brown, daughter of Andrew Brown, after whom Andrew Brown Donaldson was evidently named. Inexplicably, Andrew Brown Donaldson is commonly referred to in the art world as Andrew Benjamin Donaldson.

Andrew Brown Donaldson studied at the Royal Academy of Arts in London and he also underwent a period of training in Rome. In 1872 he was married at St. Pancras in London to Agnes Emily Twining, the youngest daughter of the well-known tea merchant Richard Twining (III) of Messrs R. Twining & Co. - Twinings - in the Strand. They had six children. Andrew's oil and watercolour paintings, the style of which was heavily influenced by the Pre-Raphaelite movement, primarily depict either actual landscapes or imagined scenes from history and mythology. Although based in London, living first in Kensington and latterly in Hampstead, Andrew Brown Donaldson frequently toured through mainland Europe in search of new scenes and inspiration, often accompanied by his wife and children. The London Metropolitan Archives holds a set of diaries kept jointly by Andrew and Agnes from the start of their marriage until the time of their deaths and they offer a vivid snapshot of domestic life in an upper-middle-class family in Victorian and Edwardian London.

The Donaldsons retired to the New Forest in Hampshire in later life, settling in the village of Lyndhurst where they lived in a house called Woodhay. Agnes Emily Donaldson died there in 1918, followed by Andrew Brown Donaldson in 1919. During his lifetime his works were exhibited by the Royal Academy and the Society of Painters (now the Royal Watercolour Society), as well as at numerous other provincial exhibitions. Today, examples of his work can be seen at various public galleries and institutions, most notably Tate Britain (see below), the Palace of Westminster and New College, Oxford, as well as at the Guildhall in Winchester and the Usher Gallery in Lincoln. The Tate's painting is a watercolour of the famous bridge - Puente de San Martín - in the ancient Spanish city of Toledo, painted by Donaldson in 1889 and gifted to the gallery in 1899 by his wife's aunt, the social reformer Louisa Twining.
