= Ben Donaldson (rugby league) =

Australian rugby league footballer

Personal information
- Full name: Ben Donaldson
- Born: 24 January 1979 (age 47) Queensland, Australia

Playing information
- Position: Hooker
Club
Years	Team	Pld	T	G	FG	P
2000–01	Newcastle Knights	9	1	0	0	4
- As of 15 Jul 2021

Ben Donaldson is an Australian former professional rugby league footballer who played in the 2000s. An alumnus of St. Joseph's Nudgee College, he played for the Newcastle Knights from 2000 to 2001.
