= Prachi River =

River in Odisha, India

Coordinates: 19°55′N 86°13′E

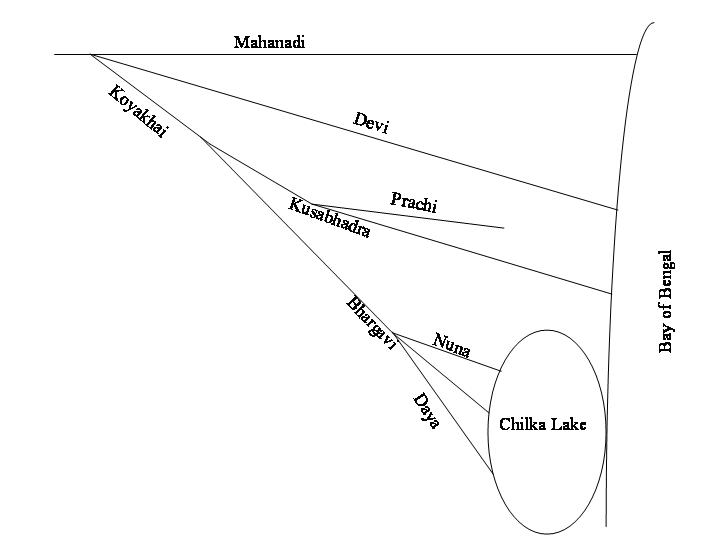
A map of the Mahanadi-Koyakhai distributary system

The Prachi, a small river of over 78 km in length with a catchment area of around 600 km^{2}, is a part of the Mahanadi River Delta in Odisha along the eastern coast of India. Presently the parts of the modern day districts of Puri, Khurda, Cuttack and Jagatsingpur comprise the Prachi valley region.

The Archaeological Survey of India (ASI) has discovered pottery pieces, and tools made of stones and bones believed to be of the pre-Christian era from a mound in Jalalpur village of Cuttack district, Odisha. Discoveries of ancient artefacts indicated that a rural settlement might have thrived in that period. These settlements could have had cultural and trade ties with other settlements in the Prachi Valley that had come up around the Prachi river, which gradually disappeared. Prachi Valley civilisation is believed to be earlier than that of Harappa and Mohenjo-Daro flourished on the banks of Prachi river. Prachi Valley civilisation has contributed a lot towards amalgamation, assimilation and proliferation of different religious faiths and cults.

Bhubaneswar MP Aparajita Sarangi on 19 May 2022 met Union Jal Shakti Minister Gajendra Singh Shekhawat and discussed the revival of the dead Prachi river passing through Khordha, Cuttack and Puri.
