= Jeffery Donaldson =

Canadian poet and critic

Jeffery William Donaldson is a Canadian poet and critic.

Born in Toronto, Ontario, Donaldson was educated at Victoria College, University of Toronto. He teaches American literature, poetry, and creative writing and literary criticism in the English Department at McMaster University and lives in Hamilton’s Westdale Village.

== Bibliography ==
=== Poetry ===
- Once Out of Nature. Toronto: McClelland & Stewart, 1991. ISBN 0-7710-2844-X
- Waterglass. Montreal: McGill-Queen's University Press, 1999. ISBN 0-7735-1900-9
- Palilalia. Montreal: McGill-Queen's University Press, 2008. ISBN 0-7735-3383-4
- Guesswork. Fredericton: Goose Lane Editions. 2011. ISBN 0-86492-621-9
- Slack Action. Porcupine's Quill, 2013.
- Fluke Print. Porcupine's Quill, 2018.
- Granted: Poems of Metaphor. Porcupine’s Quill, 2022.

=== Prose ===
- Echo Soundings: Essays on Poetry and Poetics. Palimpsest Press, 2014.
- Missing Link: the Evolution of Metaphor and the Metaphor of Evolution. Montreal: McGill-Queens University Press, 2015.
- Viaticum: from Notebooks. Porcupine’s Quill, 2019.
- Momento: On Standing in Front of Art. Gordon Hill, Spring 2023.

=== Anthologies ===
- Frye and the Word: Religious Contexts in the Writings of Northrop Frye. Toronto: University of Toronto Press, 2004. (with Alan Mendelson)
- The Essential John Reibetanz. Porcupine’s Quill, 2017.

=== Critical Materials ===
- Leckie, Ross: The Resources of Poetry. Review of Waterglass. Fiddlehead 201 (Fall 1999, Newfoundland Issue): 119–124.
- Ormsby, Eric: Of Deathbeds and Ventriloquists: Questions of Empathy. Review of Once Out of Nature. Essays on Canadian Writing 55 (Spring 1995): 240–247.
- Messenger, Cynthia: 'Confluence and Separation': The Poetry of Jeffery Donaldson. Review of Once Out of Nature. Essays on Canadian Writing 48 (Winter 1992-93): 111-115.
- Perron, Marianne: Review of Palilalia. Grasshopper Reads: A Review of Contemporary Canadian Literature. February 21, 2009. Web: November 17, 2009.
- Keith, W.J. "The Spiritual Secularized: A Reading of Jeffery Donaldson's 'Museum.'" "Canadian Poetry" 65 (Fall/Winter 2009): 65-76 .
- Pollock, James: "The Magic of Jeffery Donaldson." Canadian Notes and Queries 75 (Winter 08/09): 77-84.
- Rule, Bernadette. Interview with Jeffery Donaldson. "Art Waves." Art Waves #118 (July 17, 2011). https://archive.org/details/JefferyDonaldsonArtWaves118
- Tregebov, Rhea: Letters in Canada 1991: Poetry. Review of Once Out of Nature. University of Toronto Quarterly 62.1 (Fall 1992): 74-76.
- Sutherland, Fraser: Old, New, Borrowed, Blue. Review of Once Out of Nature. Canadian Literature 135 (Winter 1992): 177–179.

== Recognition ==
Donaldson received the Hamilton Arts Council Award for non-fiction in 2021 for his prose Viaticum: From Notebooks, and was nominated for the Canadian Author’s Association Award for Poetry in 2008 for his poem collection Palilalia. His poem collection Slack Action was also shortlisted for the Hamilton Arts Council Literary Award for Poetry.
