= Andrew Donaldson (Scottish footballer) =

Scottish footballer

Personal information
- Full name: Andrew Clark Donaldson
- Date of birth: 8 November 1886
- Place of birth: Mossend, Scotland
- Date of death: 14 June 1980 (aged 93)
- Place of death: Cleland, Scotland
- Height: 5 ft 6 in (1.68 m)
- Position: Inside left

Senior career*
Years	Team	Apps	(Gls)
1904–1906	Ashfield		
1906–1908	Motherwell	63	(15)
1908–1911	Airdrieonians	92	(22)
1911–1912	Celtic	17	(6)
1912–1918	Airdrieonians	215	(64)
1918–1920	Third Lanark	44	(9)
1920	Airdrieonians	15	(5)
1920–1922	St Johnstone		
1922	Dykehead		
Total		446	(121)
- * Club domestic league appearances and goals

Andrew Clark Donaldson (8 November 1886 – 14 June 1980) was a Scottish footballer who played as an inside left. His clubs included Motherwell, Airdrieonians (three spells, making 337 Scottish Football League and Scottish Cup appearances in total and scoring 95 goals), Celtic and Third Lanark.

== Career ==
Donaldson's father died when he was an infant – his mother remarried and at the time of the 1891 census he was known as Andrew Colquhoun. Soon afterwards his mother also died and his stepfather moved away; he and his brothers reverted to their original surname and were raised by their maternal grandparents in Motherwell. He began his football career in the juniors at Ashfield, and in March 1906 scored twice for Scotland Juniors against Ireland in March 1906; he was also capped against England a few weeks later.

Donaldson played regularly in the top division of Scottish football for 14 seasons, but never won a major trophy nor took part in a final – however, Airdrie won the minor Lanarkshire Cup six times while he was with the club, and he is known to have been involved in the 1914 victory but likely to have played in most if not all of the other finals. In January 1915 he scored four goals for Airdrie in a 5–0 league victory over Rangers, albeit this was during World War I when the SFL continued but wartime commitments and restrictions often affected the matches.

He later worked as a trainer and scout at Motherwell, including during the club's most successful period in the early 1930s.
