= Andy Donaldson (English footballer) =

English footballer (1925–1987)

Personal information
- Full name: Andrew Donaldson
- Date of birth: 22 March 1925
- Place of birth: Newcastle upon Tyne, England
- Date of death: 20 June 1987 (aged 62)
- Place of death: Peterborough, England
- Position: Centre forward

Senior career*
Years	Team	Apps	(Gls)
–1943	Vickers Armstrong		
1943–1949	Newcastle United	19	(6)
1949–1951	Middlesbrough	21	(7)
1951–1953	Peterborough United	55	(24)
1953–1955	Exeter City	39	(16)
1955–1959	Peterborough United	104	(71)
- * Club domestic league appearances and goals

Andrew Donaldson (23 March 1925 – 20 June 1987) was an English professional footballer who played in the Football League for Exeter City, Middlesbrough and Newcastle United as a centre forward. He scored prolifically for Peterborough United in non-League football and is a member of the club's Hall of Fame.

== Career statistics ==
Appearances and goals by club, season and competition
Club	Season	League			FA Cup		Other		Total	
Club	Season	Division	Apps	Goals	Apps	Goals	Apps	Goals	Apps	Goals
Newcastle United	1946–47	Second Division	1	0	0	0	—		1	0
Newcastle United	1947–48	Second Division	5	1	0	0	—		5	1
Newcastle United	1948–49	First Division	13	5	0	0	—		13	5
Newcastle United	Total		19	6	0	0	—		19	6
Middlesbrough	1948–49	First Division	14	6	0	0	—		14	6
Middlesbrough	1950–51	First Division	7	1	0	0	—		7	1
Middlesbrough	Total		21	7	0	0	—		21	7
Peterborough United	1951–52	Midland League	28	17	2	0	0	0	30	17
Peterborough United	1952–53	Midland League	27	7	8	4	1 (Note: Appearances in Maunsell Cup)	0	36	12
Peterborough United	Total		55	24	10	4	1	0	66	25
Peterborough United	1955–56	Midland League	44	27	4	0	1 (Note: Appearance in Bancroft Cup)	1	49	28
Peterborough United	1956–57	Midland League	27	20	4	4	2	0	33	24
Peterborough United	1957–58	Midland League	30	24	3	2	1	1	34	27
Peterborough United	1958–59	Midland League	3	0	0	0	0	0	3	0
Peterborough United	Total		159	95	21	10	5	2	185	107
Career total			199	108	21	10	5	2	225	120

== Honours ==
Peterborough United

- Midland League (3): 1955–56, 1956–57, 1957–58
- Maunsell Cup (2): 1956–57, 1957–58

Individual

- Peterborough United Hall of Fame
