= James Lowry Donaldson =

American soldier and author (1814–1885)

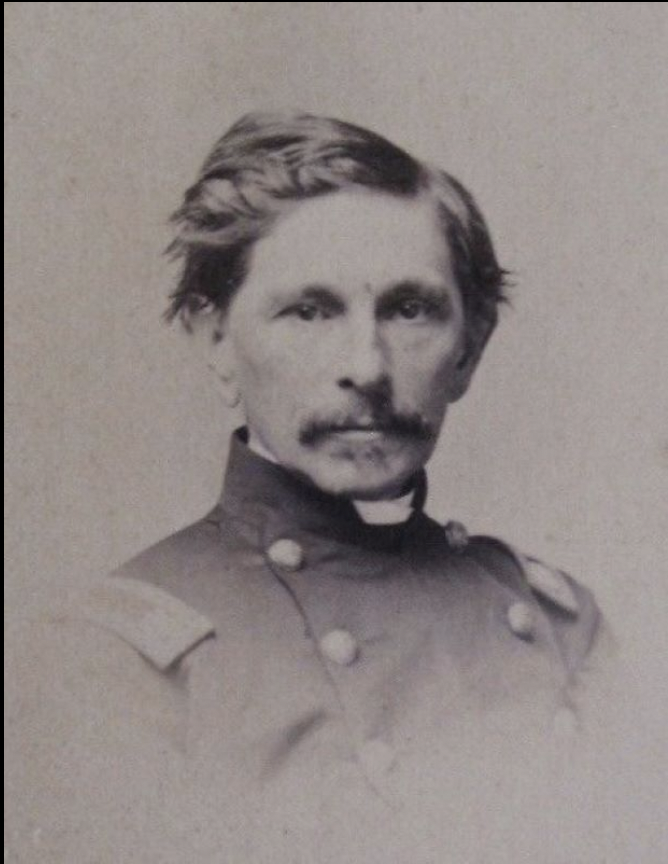
Gen. James Lowry Donaldson

General James Lowry Donaldson (March 17, 1814 – November 4, 1885) was an American soldier and writer. He served as a general in the Union Army during the American Civil War and was noted for his proficiency in military logistics.

== Biography ==
Donaldson was born in Baltimore, Maryland, to James Lowry Donaldson and Jane Stewart; his father had previously changed his name from Lowry to Donaldson at the request of relatives His father was a practicing attorney in Baltimore City, a member of the House of Delegates in Annapolis, a surveyor of the Louisiana Territory, a witness in the treason proceedings against Aaron Burr and the first fallen officer at the Battle of North Point during the War of 1812. On September 1, 1832, James Lowry Donaldson was appointed from Maryland to the United States Military Academy, graduating in 1836. Brevetted a second lieutenant in the 3rd U.S. Artillery, he was sent to the West on garrison duty, where his proficiency in logistics and supply management was first noted.

He later served with distinction as a first lieutenant in the Second Seminole War in Florida and then in the 1st U.S. Artillery during the Mexican–American War, where he was distinguished at the Battle of Buena Vista. Promoted to Major (United States) for gallantry in action, he then served in a variety of frontier outposts, including as the quartermaster at the military camp on Pawneee Fork in Kansas from 1859 to 1860. He led a wagon train of supplies through hostile Indian country into New Mexico Territory.

When the Civil War erupted, Donaldson was the Chief Quartermaster for the Department of New Mexico at Fort Union until the fall of 1862, when he was reassigned to the same post for the Middle Military Department in Baltimore. On November 9, 1863, he was reassigned to the Western Theater. Serving under his former West Point classmate, Montgomery C. Meigs, Colonel Donaldson was Chief Quartermaster of the Department of the Cumberland from November 9, 1863, to June 21, 1865. On January 23, 1865 President Abraham Lincoln nominated Donaldson for appointment to the grade of brevet brigadier general in the Regular Army (United States), to rank from September 14, 1864, and the United States Senate confirmed the appointment on February 14, 1865.

Donaldson organized the men of his quartermasters organization into a combat unit and served in the Battle of Nashville. Donaldson efficiently and effectively managed the huge supply bases that served the armies of Ulysses S. Grant, William T. Sherman, George H. Thomas and received their commendations in official reports.

Donaldson was Chief Quartermaster of the Military Division of Tennessee from June 23, 1865, until March 15, 1869. On December 11, 1866, President Andrew Johnson nominated Donaldson for appointment to the grade of brevet major general in the Regular Army (United States), to rank from March 13, 1865, and the United States Senate confirmed the appointment on March 2, 1867.

Donaldson retired from active service in 1869 and formally resigned from the army on January 1, 1874. He wrote Sergeant Atkins: a tale of the Florida War. (1871).

Donaldson died in Baltimore, Maryland on November 4, 1885, and was buried in Mount Auburn Cemetery, Cambridge, Massachusetts.

A stained glass window, "The Roman Centurion," in the Grace and St. Peter's Church in Baltimore memorializes James Lowry Donaldson.

== See also ==
- List of American Civil War brevet generals (Union)
