= Thomas Leverton Donaldson =

British architect (1795–1885)

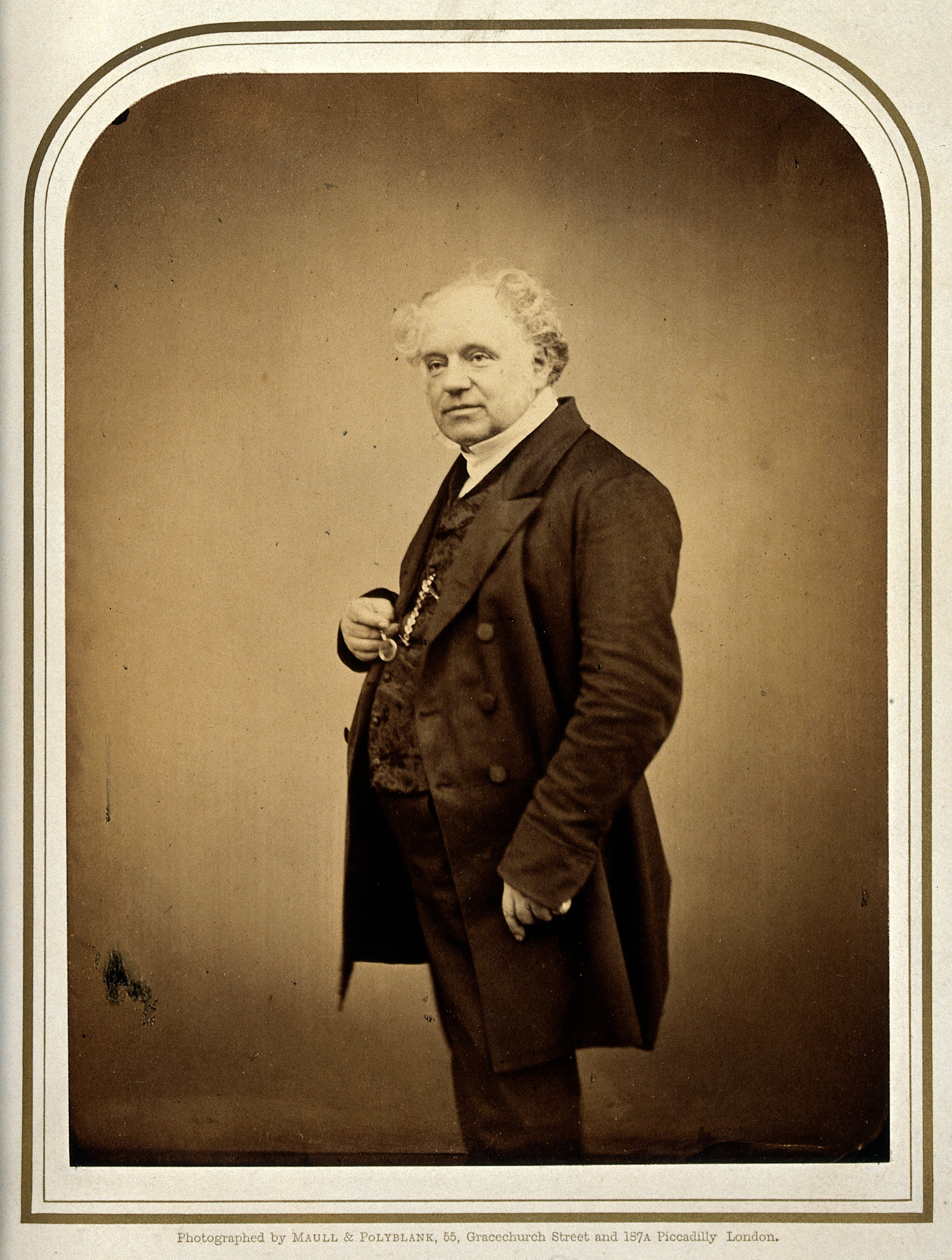
- Photograph by Maull & Polyblank
- Born: 19 October 1795; Bloomsbury Square, London
- Died: 1 August 1885 (aged 89); Upper Bedford Place, Bloomsbury
- Resting place: Brompton Cemetery, London
- Occupations: Architect, Educator, Academic
- Known for: Pioneer in architectural education
- Notable work: Co-founder and President of the Royal Institute of British Architects
- Father: James Donaldson (architect)
- Relatives: Thomas Leverton (uncle), Andrew Brown Donaldson (nephew)

Thomas Leverton Donaldson (19 October 1795 – 1 August 1885) was a British architect, notable for being a pioneer in architectural education, and as a co-founder and President of the Royal Institute of British Architects (RIBA). Donaldson was awarded the RIBA Royal Gold Medal in 1851.

== Life ==
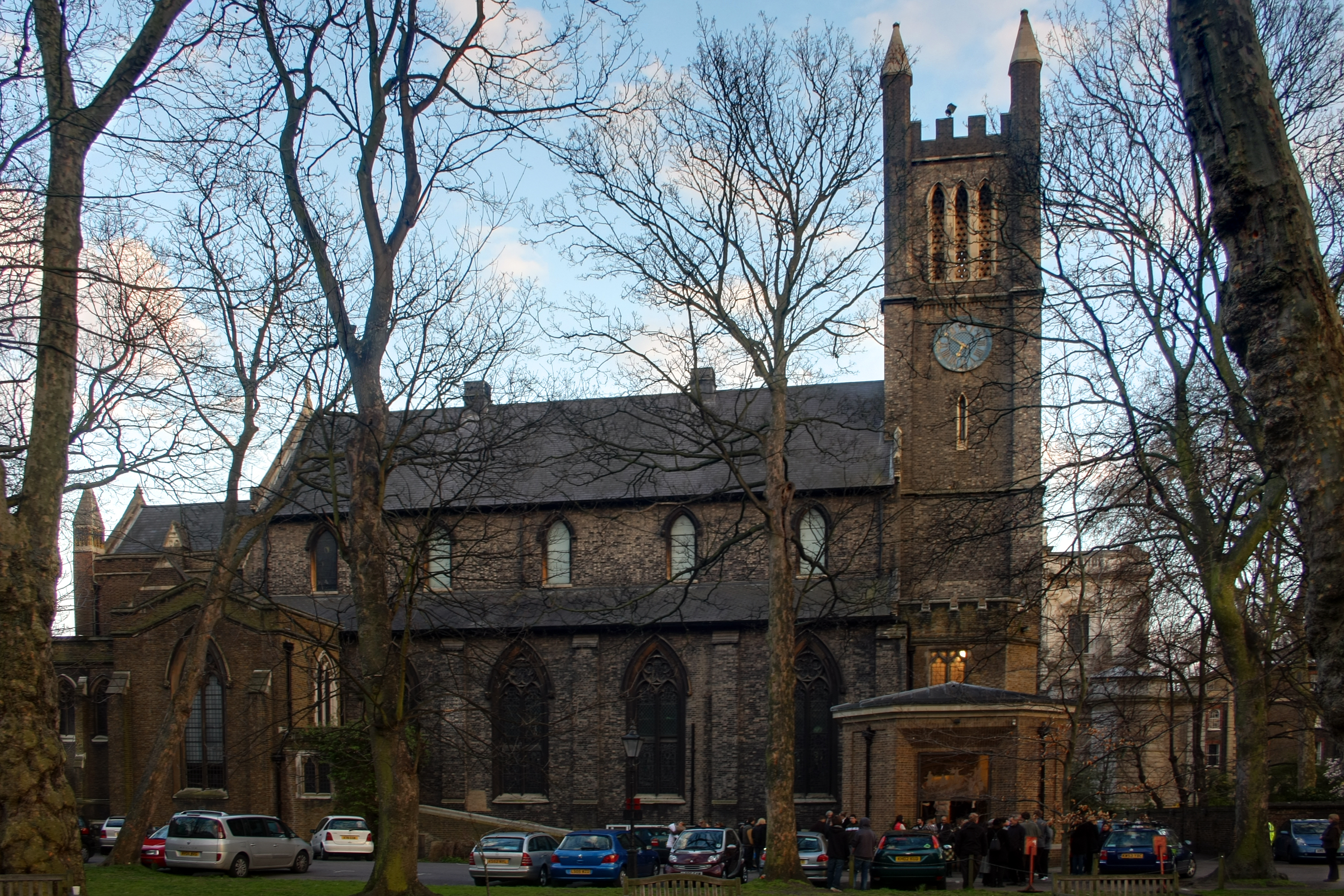
The church of Holy Trinity, Brompton

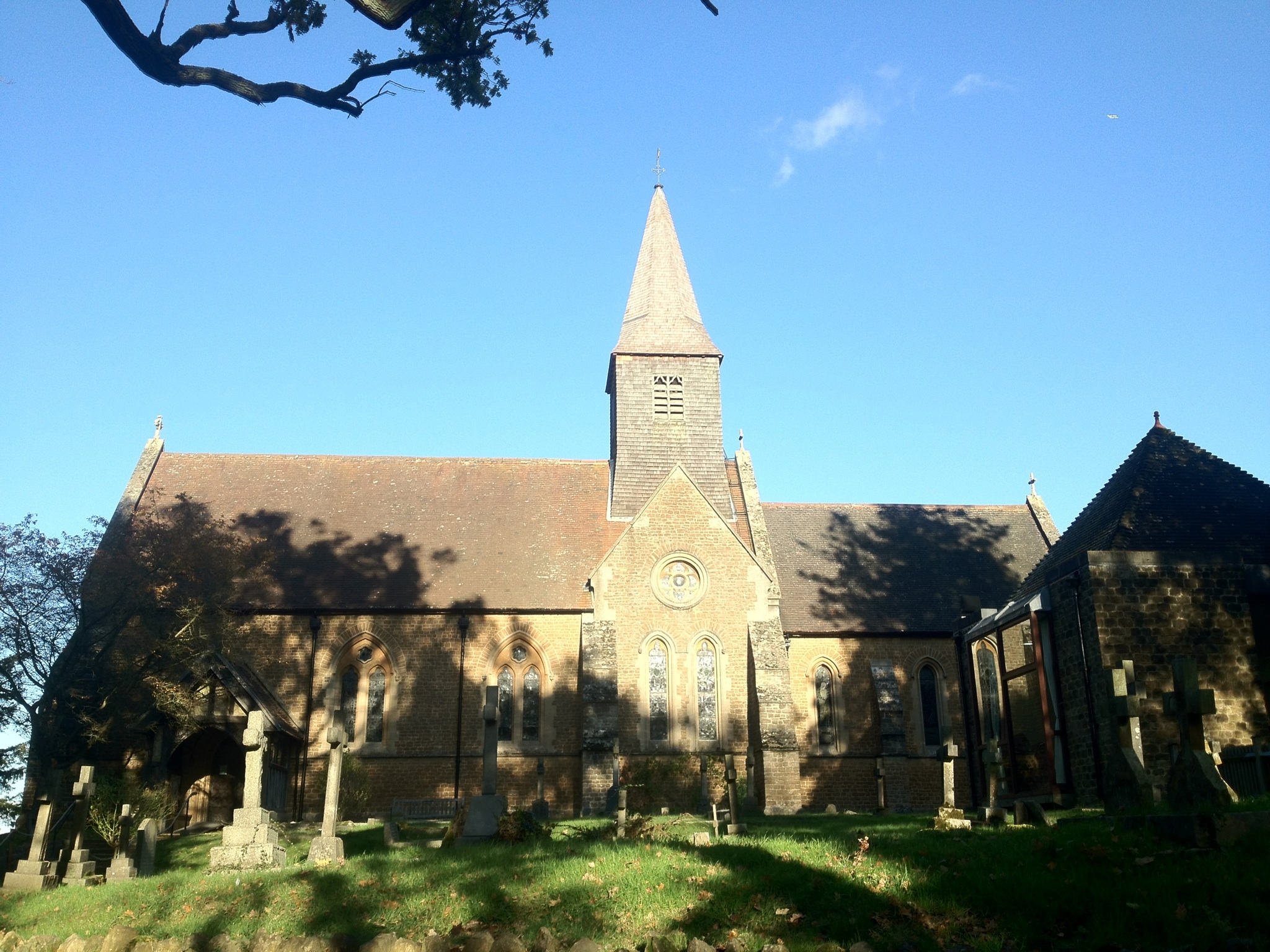
Busbridge Church of Gothic Revival style in Godalming, United Kingdom. Dedication in 1867

Donaldson was born in Bloomsbury Square, London, the eldest son of architect, James Donaldson. His maternal uncle was Thomas Leverton (1743–1824), a distinguished architect sometimes credited with the south range of Bedford Square in London.

Donaldson travelled overseas after leaving school, obtaining a clerical job with a merchant on the Cape of Good Hope before volunteering for an expedition to attack the French-controlled island of Mauritius. Once back in London, he was employed in his father's office, before visiting Italy and Greece to broaden his experience, travelling with John Lewis Wolfe and W. W. Jenkins. He designed 4 Hamilton Place for the Earl of Lucan. His first significant work was the church of Holy Trinity in South Kensington, London (built 1826-1829).

With Jacques Ignace Hittorff and Charles Robert Cockerell, Donaldson was also a member of the committee formed in 1836 to determine whether the Elgin Marbles and other Greek statuary in the British Museum had originally been coloured (see Transactions of the Royal Institute of British Architects for 1842).

Donaldson reworked substantial sections of the Wilkins building at University College London (UCL) and designed its Flaxman Gallery and library buildings. He also designed All Saints Church in Gordon Street, London, and was involved with the Great Exhibition of 1851.

Donaldson pioneered the academic study of architecture and in 1841 became the first Professor of Architecture at University College London - a post he retained until 1865. He was also a co-founder of the Royal Institute of British Architects in 1834, and continued as its honorary secretary until 1839, then as its foreign secretary for a further twenty years. He designed the institute's Mycenean lions medal and the motto 'Usui civium, decori urbium'. He was awarded the institute's royal gold medal in 1851 and was its president from 1863 to 1864. He was described by the Prince of Wales in 1879 as the father of the Institute and of the profession'.

Donaldson died in Upper Bedford Place, Bloomsbury, and is buried in Brompton Cemetery, London.

His nephew was the artist Andrew Brown Donaldson.

== Collections ==
University College London holds lecture notes taken by one of Donaldson's students during the academic year 1863 - 1864.
