= Jhamatpur =

- Village
- Location in West Bengal, India Jhamatpur (India)
- Coordinates: 23.740267°N 88.125189°E
- Country: India
- State: West Bengal
- District: Purba Bardhaman

Population (2011)
  - Total: 1,543

Languages
  - Official: Bengali, English
- Time zone: UTC+5:30 (IST)
- Lok Sabha constituency: Bolpur
- Vidhan Sabha constituency: Ketugram
- Website: bardhaman.gov.in

Jhamatpur is a village in Ketugram II CD block in Katwa subdivision of Purba Bardhaman district, West Bengal, India

== Geography ==
It is near Ketugram, 4 km east of Jhamatpur-Baharanpur, 157 km north from Howrah Station, on the B.A.K. loop of the Eastern Railway. This is about 14 km north of Katwa. Jhamatpur Baharan railway station serves nearby areas.

== Demographics ==
As per the 2011 Census of India Jhamatpur had a total population of 1,543, of which 794 (51%) were males and 749 (49%) were females. Population below 6 years was 154. The total number of literates in Jhamatpur was 931 (67.03% of the population over 6 years).
