= Ketugram II =

- Community development block
- Location in West Bengal
- Coordinates: 23°42′41″N 88°05′55″E
- Country: India
- State: West Bengal
- District: Purba Bardhaman
- Parliamentary constituency: Bolpur
- Assembly constituency: Ketugram

Area
  - Total: 61.79 sq mi (160.03 km^{2})
- Elevation: 85 ft (26 m)

Population (2011)
  - Total: 118,567
  - Density: 1,918.9/sq mi (740.90/km^{2})
- Time zone: UTC+5.30 (IST)
- PIN: 713140 (Ketugram); 713130 (Gangatikuri)
- Telephone/STD code: 03453
- Vehicle registration: WB-37,WB-38,WB-41,WB-42,WB-44
- Literacy Rate: 65.96 per cent
- Website: http://purbabardhaman.gov.in/

Ketugram II is a community development block that forms an administrative division in Katwa subdivision of Purba Bardhaman district in the Indian state of West Bengal.

== Geography ==
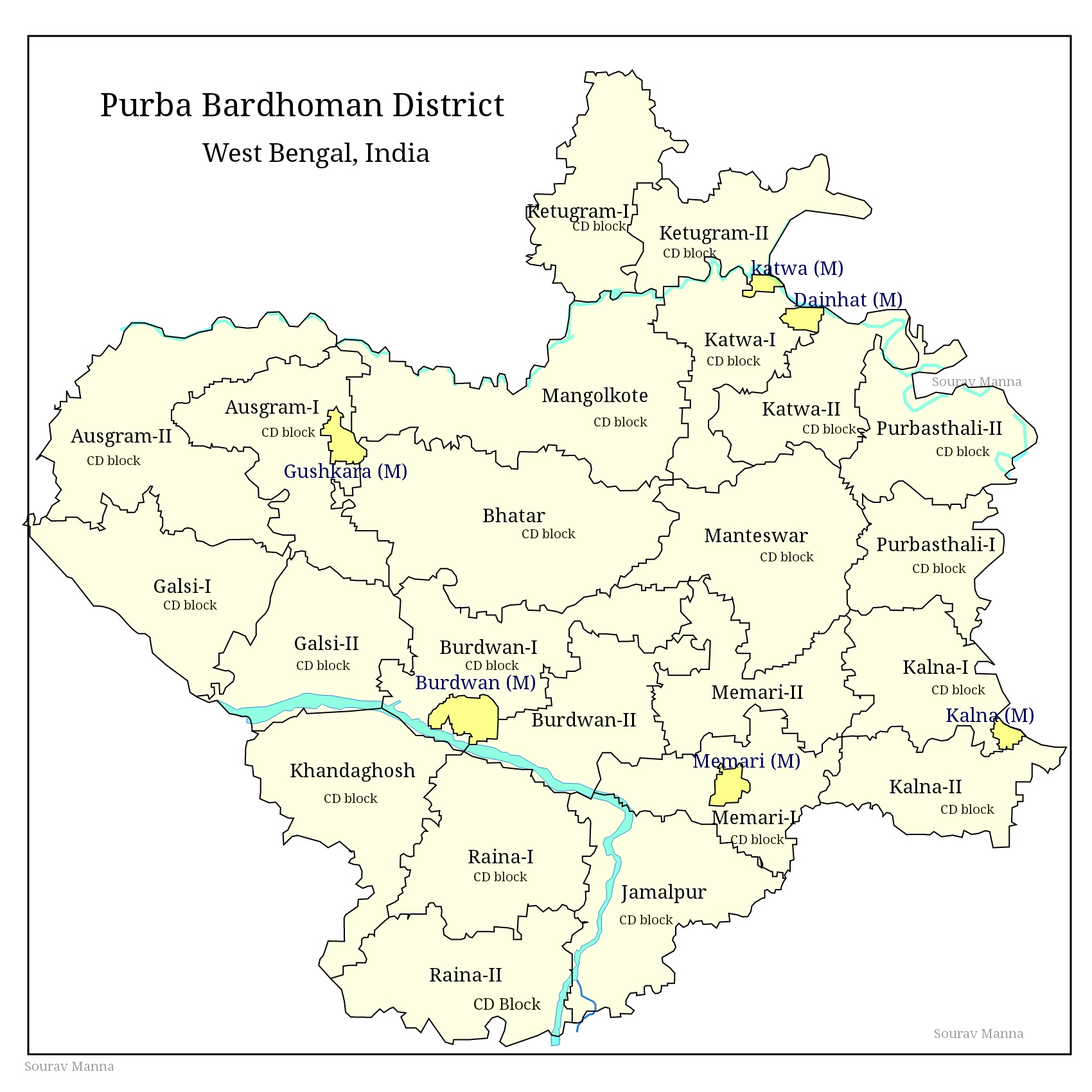
CD blocks of Purba Bardhaman district

=== Location ===
Gangatikuri, a gram panchayat in Ketugram II CD Block, is located at 23°42′41″N 88°05′55″E. Ketugram II CD Block is part of the Kanksa Ketugram plain and the Bhagirathi basin. The Ajay forms the southern boundary of the CD Block before joining the Bhagirathi. The soil is alluvial of recent origin.

Ketugram II CD Block is bounded by Bharatpur II CD Block, in Murshidabad district, on the north, Kaliganj CD Block, in Nadia district across the Bhagirathi, on the east, Katwa I and Mangolkote CD Blocks on the south and Ketugram I CD Block on the west.

Ketugram II CD Block has an area of 160.03 km^{2}. It has 1 panchayat samity, 7 gram panchayats, 90 gram sansads (village councils), 56 mouzas and 55 inhabited villages. Ketugram police station serves this block. Headquarters of this CD Block is at Gangatikuri.

Gram panchayats of Ketugram II block/panchayat samiti are: Billeswar, Gangatikuri, Ketugram, Mougram, Nabagram, Nirole and Sitahati.

== Demographics ==
=== Population ===
As per the 2011 Census of India Ketugram II CD Block had a total population of 118,567, all of which were rural. There were 61,413 (52%) males and 57,154 (48%) females. Population below 6 years was 13,443. Scheduled Castes numbered 43,442 (36.64%) and Scheduled Tribes numbered 692 (0.58%).

As per the 2001 census, Ketugram II block had a total population of 107,011, out of which 55,278 were males and 51,733 were females. Ketugram II block registered a population growth of 12.82 per cent during the 1991-2001 decade. Decadal growth for Bardhaman district was 14.36 per cent. Decadal growth in West Bengal was 17.84 per cent. Scheduled castes at 39,197 formed around one-third the population. Scheduled tribes numbered 872.

Large villages (with 4,000+ population) in Ketugram II CD Block are (2011 census figures in brackets): Ketugram (9,990), Nirol (7,031), Srirampur (4,043), Gangatikuri (4,053), Baharan (4,562), Keuguri (4,682), Maugram (6,927) and Char Sujapur (4,696).

Other villages in Ketugram II CD Block included (2011 census figures in brackets): Uddharanpur (3,437), Sitahati (1,262), Nabagram (1,683), Billeswar (3,625) and Jhamatpur (1,543).

=== Literacy ===
As per the 2011 census, the total number of literates in Ketugram II CD Block was 69,335 (65.96% of the population over 6 years) out of which males numbered 39,072 (71.65% of the male population over 6 years) and females numbered 30,263 (59.82% of the female population over 6 years). The gender disparity (the difference between female and male literacy rates) was 11.83%.

As per the 2001 census, Ketugram II block had a total literacy of 61.06 per cent for the 6+ age group. While male literacy was 68.75 per cent female literacy was 52.88 per cent. Bardhaman district had a total literacy of 70.18 per cent, male literacy being 78.63 per cent and female literacy being 60.95 per cent.

See also – List of West Bengal districts ranked by literacy rate

Literacy in CD blocks of
Bardhaman district
Bardhaman Sadar North subdivision
Ausgram I – 69.39%
Ausgram II – 68.00%
Bhatar – 71.56%
Burdwan I – 76.07%
Burdwan II – 74.12%
Galsi II – 70.05%
Bardhaman Sadar South subdivision
Khandaghosh – 77.28%
Raina I – 80.20%
Raina II – 81.48%
Jamalpur – 74.08%
Memari I – 74.10%
Memari II – 74.59%
Kalna subdivision
Kalna I – 75.81%
Kalna II – 76.25%
Manteswar – 73.08%
Purbasthali I – 77.59%
Purbasthali II – 70.35%
Katwa subdivision
Katwa I – 70.36%
Katwa II – 69.16%
Ketugram I – 68.00%
Ketugram II – 65.96%
Mongalkote – 67.97%
Durgapur subdivision
Andal – 77.25%
Faridpur Durgapur – 74.14%
Galsi I – 72.81%
Kanksa – 76.34%
Pandabeswar – 73.01%
Asansol subdivision
Barabani – 69.58%
Jamuria – 69.42%
Raniganj – 73.86%
Salanpur – 78.76%
2011 Census: CD Block Wise

Primary Census Abstract Data

=== Languages and religion ===
Religion in Ketugram II CD block (2011)
Hinduism	79.75%
Islam	20.15%
Other or not stated	0.10%

In the 2011 census, Hindus numbered 94,555 and formed 79.75% of the population in Ketugram II CD Block. Muslims numbered 23,895 and formed 20.15% of the population. Christians numbered 38 and formed 0.03% of the population. Others numbered 79 and formed 0.07% of the population.

In Bardhaman district, the percentage of Hindu population has been declining from 84.3% in 1961 to 77.9% in 2011 and the percentage of Muslim population has increased from 15.2% in 1961 to 20.7% in 2011.

Bengali is the predominant language, spoken by 99.85% of the population.

== Rural poverty ==
As per poverty estimates obtained from household survey for families living below poverty line in 2005, rural poverty in Ketugram II CD Block was 36.07%.

== Economy ==
=== Livelihood ===
In Ketugram II CD Block in 2011, amongst the class of total workers, cultivators formed 26.46%, agricultural labourers 44.05%, household industry workers 6.27% and other workers 23.21%.

In Ketugram II CD Block, cultivators or agricultural labourers formed a large portion of the workforce, comparatively less workers were engaged in the secondary and tertiary sectors. In the decade 1991-2001 cultivators decreased and the secondary and tertiary sectors increased.

=== Infrastructure ===
There are 55 inhabited villages in Ketugram II CD block. All 55 villages (100%) have power supply. All 55 villages (100%) have drinking water supply. 18 villages (32.73%) have post offices. 49 villages (89.09%) have telephones (including landlines, public call offices and mobile phones). 36 villages (65.45%) have a pucca (paved) approach road and 34 villages (61.82%) have transport communication (includes bus service, rail facility and navigable waterways). 6 villages (10.91%) have agricultural credit societies. 6 villages (10.91%) have banks.

In 2013–14, there were 53 fertiliser depots and 37 fair price shops in the CD Block.

=== Agriculture ===
Persons engaged in agriculture
in Ketugram II CD Block
1. Bargadars (5.60%)
2. Patta holders (9.64%)
3. Small farmers (7.31%)
4. Marginal farmers (24.4%)
5. Agricultural labourers (53.1%)

Although the Bargadari Act of 1950 recognised the rights of bargadars to a higher share of crops from the land that they tilled, it was not implemented fully. Large tracts, beyond the prescribed limit of land ceiling, remained with the rich landlords. From 1977 onwards major land reforms took place in West Bengal. Land in excess of land ceiling was acquired and distributed amongst the peasants. Following land reforms land ownership pattern has undergone transformation. In 2013–14, persons engaged in agriculture in Ketugram II CD Block could be classified as follows: bargadars 5.60%, patta (document) holders 9.64%, small farmers (possessing land between 1 and 2 hectares) 7.31%, marginal farmers (possessing land up to 1 hectare) 24.40% and agricultural labourers 53.06%.

In 2003-04 net cropped area in Ketugram II CD Block was 11,502 hectares and the area in which more than one crop was grown was 8,790 hectares.

In 2013–14, Ketugram II CD Block produced 25,318 tonnes of Aman paddy, the main winter crop from 8,431 hectares, 31,645 tonnes of Boro paddy (spring crop) from 7,696 hectares, 394 tonnes of wheat from 145 hectare, 4,383 tonnes of jute from 202 hectares, 5,465 tonnes of potatoes from 301 hectares and 72,111 tonnes of sugar cane from 1,178 hectares. It also produced pulses and oilseeds.

In Bardhaman district as a whole Aman paddy constituted 64.32% of the total area under paddy cultivation, while the area under Boro and Aus paddy constituted 32.87% and 2.81% respectively. The expansion of Boro paddy cultivation, with higher yield rates, was the result of expansion of irrigation system and intensive cropping. In 2013–14, the total area irrigated in Ketugram II CD Block was 1,437.31 hectares, out of which 1,141.14 hectares were irrigated by river lift irrigation and 296.17 hectares by deep tube wells.

=== Banking ===
In 2013–14, Ketugram II CD Block had offices of 5 commercial banks and 1 gramin bank.

== Transport ==
The Barharwa-Azimganj-Katwa loop passes through this block and there are stations at Shiblun and Gangatikuri.

Ketugram II CD Block has 5 ferry services and 3 originating/ terminating bus routes.

SH 6, running from Rajnagar (in Birbhum district) to Alampur (in Howrah district) passes through this CD Block.

== Education ==
In 2013–14, Ketugram II CD Block had 83 primary schools with 5,302 students, 2 middle schools with 310 students, 11 high school with 6,427 students and 5 higher secondary schools with 3,950 students. Ketugram II CD Block had 201 institutions for special and non-formal education with 9,956 students

As per the 2011 census, in Ketugram II CD block, amongst the 55 inhabited villages, all villages had schools, 35 villages had two or more primary schools, 20 villages had at least 1 primary and 1 middle school and 12 villages had at least 1 middle and 1 secondary school.

More than 6,000 schools (in erstwhile Bardhaman district) serve cooked midday meal to more than 900,000 students.

== Healthcare ==
In 2014, Ketugram II CD Block had 1 block primary health centre and 2 primary health centres with total 25 beds and 3 doctors (excluding private bodies). It had 18 family welfare subcentres. 1,098 patients were treated indoor and 142,364 patients were treated outdoor in the hospitals, health centres and subcentres of the CD Block.

Ketugram block primary health centre at Ketugram (with 15 beds) is the main medical facility in Ketugram II CD block. There are primary health centres at Sibloon (with 10 beds) and Sitahati (with 4 beds).

Ketugram II CD Block is one of the areas of Bardhaman district which is affected by a low level of arsenic contamination of ground water.

== Veterinary Facilities ==
Block Animal Health Centre, Ketugram II, Purba Bardhaman under Block Livestock Development Office, Ketugram II at Gangatikuri village is the main veterinary facility available in Ketugram II CD Block.

Free & on call veterinary services are also available in this block at farmer's doorstep provided by Mobile Veterinary Unit under BLDO, Ketugram II. One can avail this service by dialing toll free number 1962.

There are also five numbers of Animal Development Aid Centres (ADACs) under BLDO, Ketugram-II situated in five different Gram Panchayets of this block such as - 1. ADAC Ketugram; 2. ADAC Billeshwar; 3. ADAC Nabagram; 4. ADAC Sitahati & 5.ADAC Mougram. No ADAC is situated at Nirol Gram Panchayet. The ADACs provides primary treatment and artificial insemination facilities to livestock owners though most of these ADACs are currently non functional.
