= Ketugram I =

- Community development block
- Location in West Bengal
- Coordinates: 23°42′36″N 87°57′24″E
- Country: India
- State: West Bengal
- District: Purba Bardhaman
- Parliamentary constituency: Bolpur
- Assembly constituency: Ketugram

Area
  - Total: 74.90 sq mi (193.98 km^{2})
- Elevation: 59 ft (18 m)

Population (2011)
  - Total: 165,408
  - Density: 2,208.5/sq mi (852.71/km^{2})
- Time zone: UTC+5.30 (IST)
- PIN: 713129 (Kandra)
- Telephone/STD code: 03453
- Vehicle registration: WB-37,WB-38,WB-41,WB-42,WB-44
- Literacy Rate: 68.00 per cent
- Website: http://purbabardhaman.gov.in/

Ketugram I is a community development block that forms an administrative division in Katwa subdivision of Purba Bardhaman district in the Indian state of West Bengal.

== Geography ==
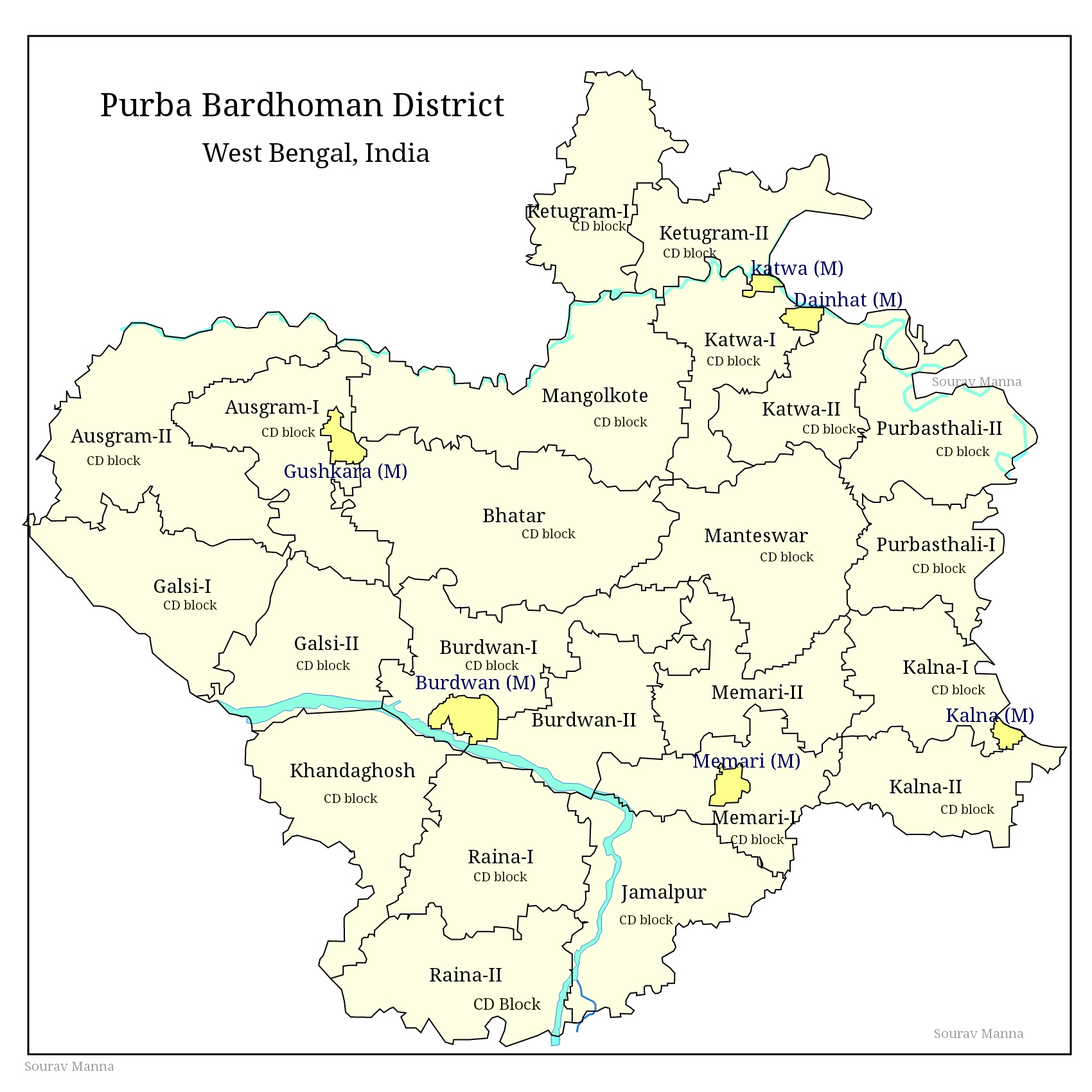
CD blocks of Purba Bardhaman district

=== Location ===
Rajoor, a constituent gram panchayat of Ketugram I block, is located at 23°42′36″N 87°57′24″E.

Ketugram I CD Block is part of the Kanksa Ketugram plain, which lies along the Ajay. The river forms the southern boundary of the CD Block. The soil is alluvial of recent origin.

Ketugram I CD Block is bounded by Bharatpur I CD Block, in Murshidabad district, on the north, Bharatpur II CD Block, in Murshidabad district, and Ketugram II CD Block on the east, Mangolkote CD Block on the south and Nanoor and Labpur CD Blocks, in Birbhum district, on the west.

Ketugram I CD Block has an area of 193.98 km^{2}. It has 1 panchayat samity, 8 gram panchayats, 117 gram sansads (village councils), 66 mouzas and 62 inhabited villages. Ketugram police station serves this block. Headquarters of this CD Block is at Kandra.

Gram panchayats of Ketugram I block/panchayat samiti are: Agardanga, Ankhona, Berugram, Kandra-Jnandas, Murgram-Gopalpur, Palita, Pandugram and Rajoor.

== Demographics ==
=== Population ===
As per the 2011 Census of India Ketugram I CD Block had a total population of 165,408, all of which were rural. There were 84,966 (51%) males and 80,442 (49%) females. Population below 6 years was 21,009. Scheduled Castes numbered 42,660 (25.79%) and Scheduled Tribes numbered 1,025 (0.62%).

As per 2001 census, Ketugram I block had a total population of 146,013, out of which 74,513 were males and 71,500 were females. Ketugram I block registered a population growth of 16.38 per cent during the 1991-2001 decade. Decadal growth for Bardhaman district was 14.36 per cent. Decadal growth in West Bengal was 17.84 per cent. Scheduled castes at 40,271 formed around one-third the population. Scheduled tribes numbered 1,491.

Large villages (with 4,000+ population) in Ketugram I CD Block are (2011 census figures in brackets): Chakta (4,582), Ankhona (6,554), Morgram (6,197), Murgram (5,919), Amgaria (6,904), Kandra (11,534), Komarpur (4,110), Rajur (5,776), Khanji (4.052), Ehiapur (5,732), Palita (4,342) and Pandugram (4,178).

Other villages in Ketugram I CD Block included (2011 census figures in brackets): Agardanga (2,767), Berugram (3,489), Gopalpur (3,157), Gonna Serandi (2,683) and Kogram (383).

=== Literacy ===
As per the 2011 census, the total number of literates in Ketugram I CD Block was 98,192 (68.00% of the population over 6 years) out of which males numbered 54,043 (72.81% of the male population over 6 years) and females numbered 44,149 (62.91% of the female population over 6 years). The gender disparity (the difference between female and male literacy rates) was 9.90%.

As per the 2001 census, Ketugram I block had a total literacy of 59.88 per cent for the 6+ age group. While male literacy was 67.78 per cent female literacy was 51.63 per cent. Bardhaman district had a total literacy of 70.18 per cent, male literacy being 78.63 per cent and female literacy being 60.95 per cent.

See also – List of West Bengal districts ranked by literacy rate

Literacy in CD blocks of
Bardhaman district
Bardhaman Sadar North subdivision
Ausgram I – 69.39%
Ausgram II – 68.00%
Bhatar – 71.56%
Burdwan I – 76.07%
Burdwan II – 74.12%
Galsi II – 70.05%
Bardhaman Sadar South subdivision
Khandaghosh – 77.28%
Raina I – 80.20%
Raina II – 81.48%
Jamalpur – 74.08%
Memari I – 74.10%
Memari II – 74.59%
Kalna subdivision
Kalna I – 75.81%
Kalna II – 76.25%
Manteswar – 73.08%
Purbasthali I – 77.59%
Purbasthali II – 70.35%
Katwa subdivision
Katwa I – 70.36%
Katwa II – 69.16%
Ketugram I – 68.00%
Ketugram II – 65.96%
Mongalkote – 67.97%
Durgapur subdivision
Andal – 77.25%
Faridpur Durgapur – 74.14%
Galsi I – 72.81%
Kanksa – 76.34%
Pandabeswar – 73.01%
Asansol subdivision
Barabani – 69.58%
Jamuria – 69.42%
Raniganj – 73.86%
Salanpur – 78.76%
2011 Census: CD Block Wise

Primary Census Abstract Data

=== Languages and religion ===
Religion in Ketugram I CD block (2011)
Hinduism	52.98%
Islam	46.77%
Other or not stated	0.25%

In the 2011 census, Hindus numbered 87,635 and formed 52.98% of the population in Ketugram I CD Block. Muslims numbered 77,354 and formed 46.77% of the population. Christians numbered 95 and formed 0.06% of the population. Others numbered 324 and formed 0.20% of the population.

In Bardhaman district the percentage of Hindu population has been declining from 84.3% in 1961 to 77.9% in 2011 and the percentage of Muslim population has increased from 15.2% in 1961 to 20.7% in 2011.

Bengali is the predominant language, spoken by 99.64% of the population.

== Rural poverty ==
As per poverty estimates obtained from household survey for families living below poverty line in 2005, rural poverty in Ketugram I CD Block was 44.87%.

== Economy ==
=== Livelihood ===
In Ketugram I CD Block in 2011, amongst the class of total workers, cultivators formed 23.27%, agricultural labourers 51.57%, household industry workers 4.25% and other workers 20.91%.

In Ketugram I CD Block, cultivators or agricultural labourers formed a large portion of the workforce, comparatively less workers were engaged in the secondary and tertiary sectors. In the decade 1991-2001 cultivators decreased and the secondary and tertiary sectors increased.

=== Infrastructure ===
There are 62 inhabited villages in Ketugram I CD block. All 62 villages (100%) have power supply. All 62 villages (100%) have drinking water supply. 25 villages (40.32%) have post offices. 61 villages (98.31%) have telephones (including landlines, public call offices and mobile phones). 47 villages (75.81%) have a pucca (paved) approach road and 44 villages (58.46%) have transport communication (includes bus service, rail facility and navigable waterways). 7 villages (11.21%) have agricultural credit societies. 7 villages (11.21%) have banks.

In 2013-14, there were 27 fertiliser depots and 55 fair price shops in the CD Block.

=== Agriculture ===
Persons engaged in agriculture
in Ketugram I CD Block
1. Bargadars (9.58%)
2. Patta holders (6.77%)
3. Small farmers (5.78%)
4. Marginal farmers (19.2%)
5. Agricultural labourers (58.7%)

Although the Bargadari Act of 1950 recognised the rights of bargadars to a higher share of crops from the land that they tilled, it was not implemented fully. Large tracts, beyond the prescribed limit of land ceiling, remained with the rich landlords. From 1977 onwards major land reforms took place in West Bengal. Land in excess of land ceiling was acquired and distributed amongst the peasants. Following land reforms land ownership pattern has undergone transformation. In 2013-14, persons engaged in agriculture in Ketugram I CD Block could be classified as follows: bargadars 9.58%, patta (document) holders 6.77%, small farmers (possessing land between 1 and 2 hectares) 5.78%, marginal farmers (possessing land up to 1 hectare) 19.18% and agricultural labourers 58.69%.

In 2003-04, net cropped area in Ketugram I CD Block was 15,148 hectares and the area in which more than one crop was grown was 6,337 hectares.

In 2013-14, Ketugram I CD Block produced 46,641 tonnes of Aman paddy, the main winter crop from 15,783 hectares, 23,379 tonnes of Boro paddy (spring crop) from 6,326 hectares, 3 tonnes of wheat from 1 hectare, 2,436 tonnes of potatoes from 146 hectares and 6,952 tonnes of sugar cane from 76 hectares. It also produced pulses and oilseeds.

In 2013-14, the total area irrigated in Ketugram I CD Block was 286.96 hectares, out of which 27.87 hectares were irrigated by river lift irrigation and 259.09 hectares by deep tube wells.

=== Banking ===
In 2013-14, Ketugram I CD Block had offices of 4 commercial banks and 3 gramin banks.

== Transport ==
Ketugram I CD Block has 4 ferry services and 3 originating/ terminating bus routes.

SH 6, running from Rajnagar (in Birbhum district) to Alampur (in Howrah district) and SH 7 running from Rajgram (in Birbhum district) to Midnapore (in Paschim Medinipur district) cross at Kurmodanga in this CD Block.

== Education ==
In 2013-14, Ketugram I CD Block had 100 primary schools with 9,481 students, 4 middle schools with 354 students, 16 high school with 9,304 students and 9 higher secondary schools with 6,233 students. Ketugram I CD Block had 1 general college with 2,433 students, 1 technical/ professional institution with 100 students and 281 institutions for special and non-formal education with 15,724 students

As per the 2011 census, in Ketugram I CD block, amongst the 62 inhabited villages, all villages had schools, 50 villages had two or more primary schools, 28 villages had at least 1 primary and 1 middle school and 24 villages had at least 1 middle and 1 secondary school.

More than 6,000 schools (in erstwhile Bardhaman district) serve cooked midday meal to more than 900,000 students.

Kandra Radha Kanta Kundu Mahavidyalaya, established in 2001, is affiliated to the University of Burdwan.

== Healthcare ==
In 2014, Ketugram I CD Block had 1 block primary health centre and 2 primary health centres with total 28 beds and 5 doctors (excluding private bodies). It had 24 family welfare subcentres. 10,083 patients were treated indoor and 180,625 patients were treated outdoor in the hospitals, health centres and subcentres of the CD Block.

Ramjibanpur Rural Hospital at Ramjibanpur, PO Jnandas Kandra (with 30 beds) is the main medical facility in Ketugram I CD block. There are primary health centres at Ankhona (with 2 beds) and Pandugram, PO Khatundi (with 10 beds).

Ketugram I CD Block is one of the areas of Bardhaman district which is affected by a low level of arsenic contamination of ground water.
