= Uddharan Dutta Thakura =

Indian philosopher

Srila Uddharana Dutta Thakura
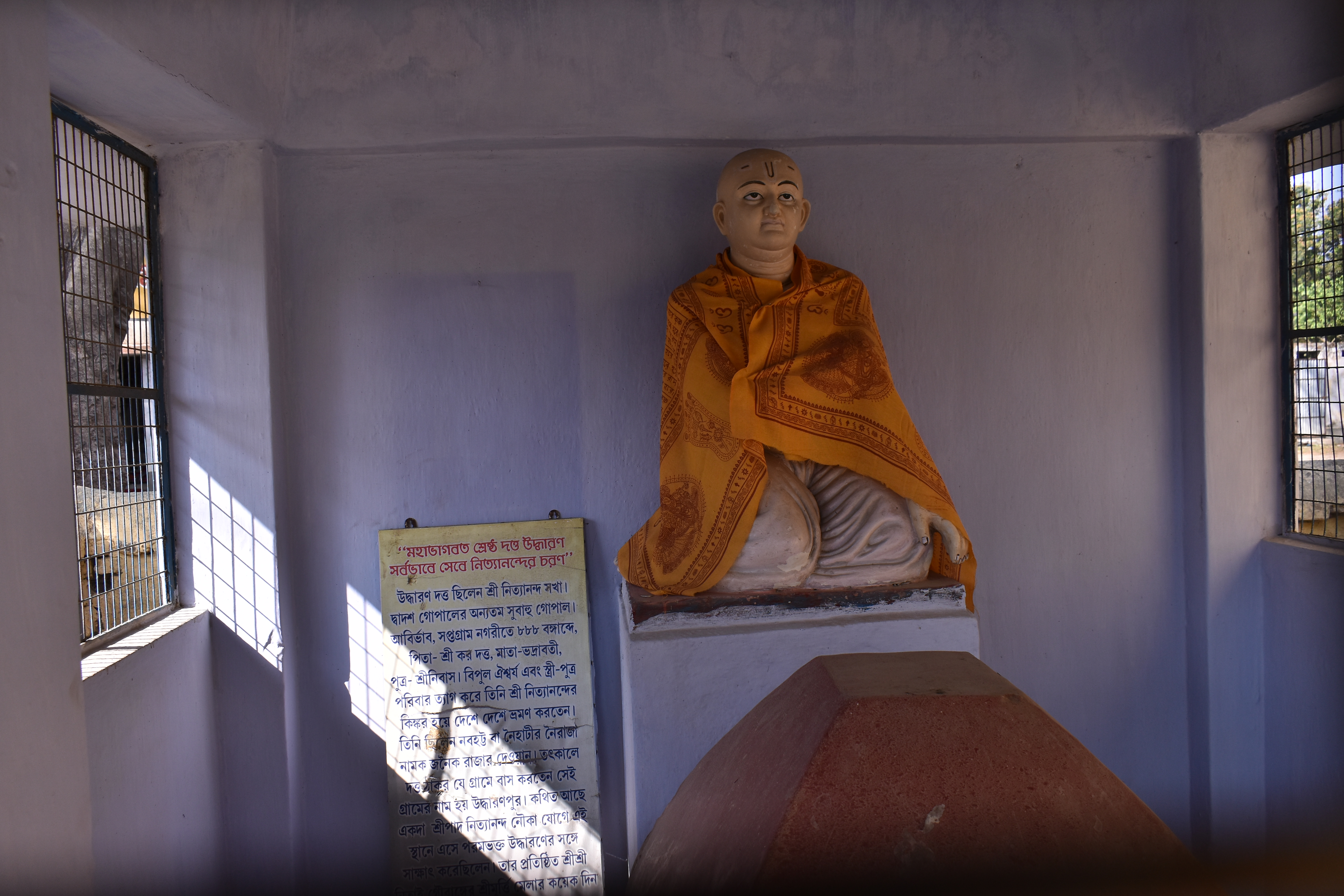
- Statue of Uddharana Dutta at Uddharanpur

Personal life
- Born: Dibakara Dutta c. 27 August 1481 Saptagram (সপ্তগ্রাম), Hooghly district, Bengal Sultanate, present-day West Bengal, India)
- Died: c. 25 November 1541 (aged 60) Krishna Troyodoshi 1541 AD, or Krishna Troyodoshi 1463 Saka Year Vrindavan
- Resting place: Vrindavan, India
- Spouse: Suprasanna Devi Sister of Haladhar Sen
- Children: Priyankar Dutta Later named Srinivas Dutta Thakur
- Parents: Srikara Dutta (father); Bhadravati Devi, (mother)
- Known for: Codifying Gaudiya Vaishnavism
- Relatives: Umapati Dhara, Haladhar Sen, Gouri Sen
- Honors: Dwadasha gopas, the 12 cowherd-boy associates from Goloka Vrindavan who were always in the company of Krishna and Balaram.

Religious life
- Religion: Hinduism
- Denomination: Vaishnavism
- Philosophy: Achintya Bheda Abheda
- Lineage: Brahma-Madhva-Gaudiya
- Sect: Gaudiya Vaishnavism

Religious career
- Teacher: Nityananda
- Based in: Vrindavan, India

Uddharan Dutta Thakur (উদ্ধারণ দত্ত ঠাকুর) (c. 1481 – c. 1541) was an Indian philosopher and saint from the Gaudiya Vaishnava school of Vedanta tradition, producing a great number of philosophical works on the theology and practice of Bhakti yoga, Vaishnava Vedanta and associated disciplines. He is known as one of the Dwadasha gopas, (the 12 cowherd-boy associates from Goloka Vrindavan who were always in the company of Krishna and Balaram).

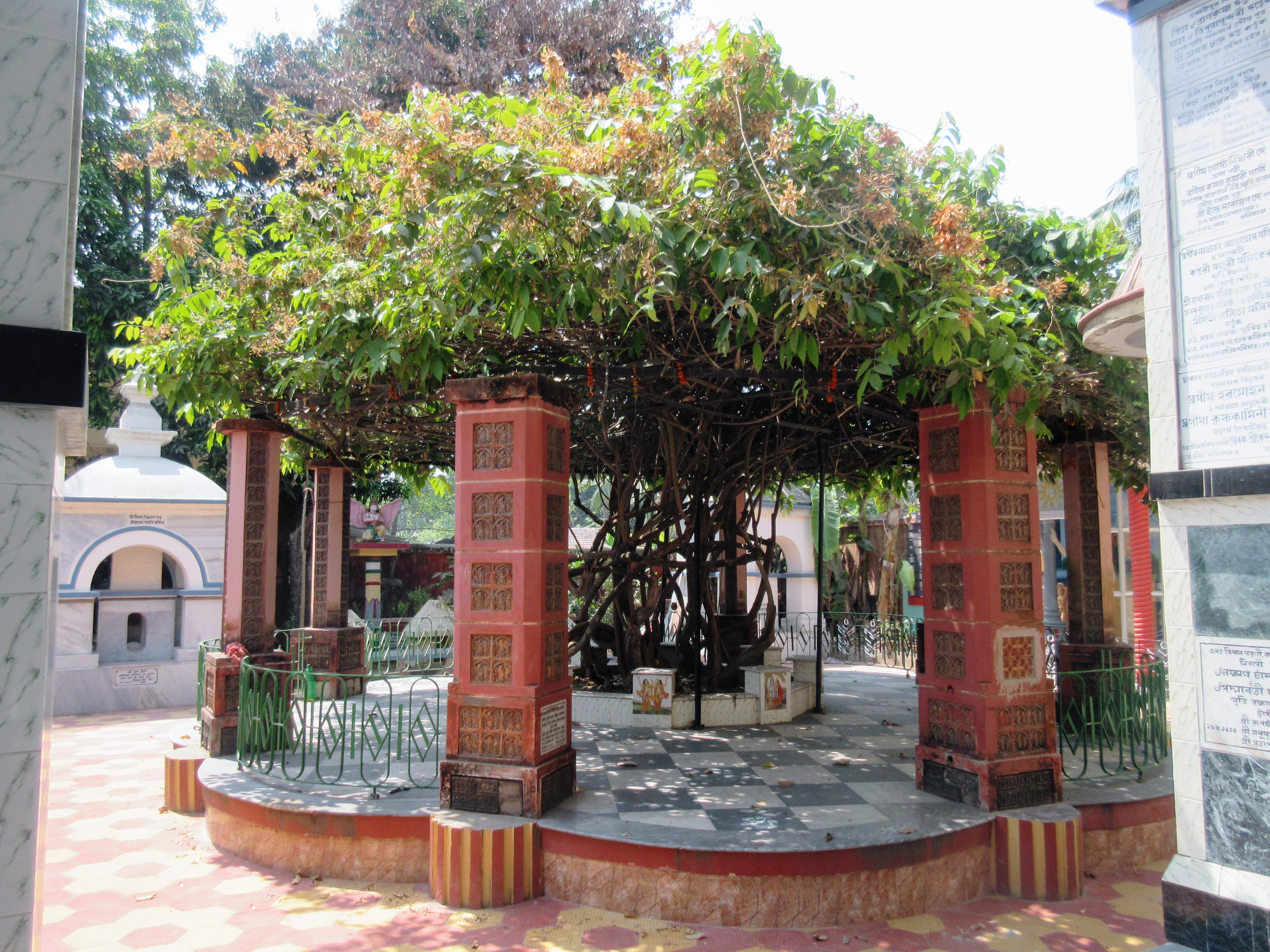
The Holy Madhavi vine tree at Uddharan Dutta Thakur's Sripat in Saptagram

== Biography ==
=== Genealogy ===
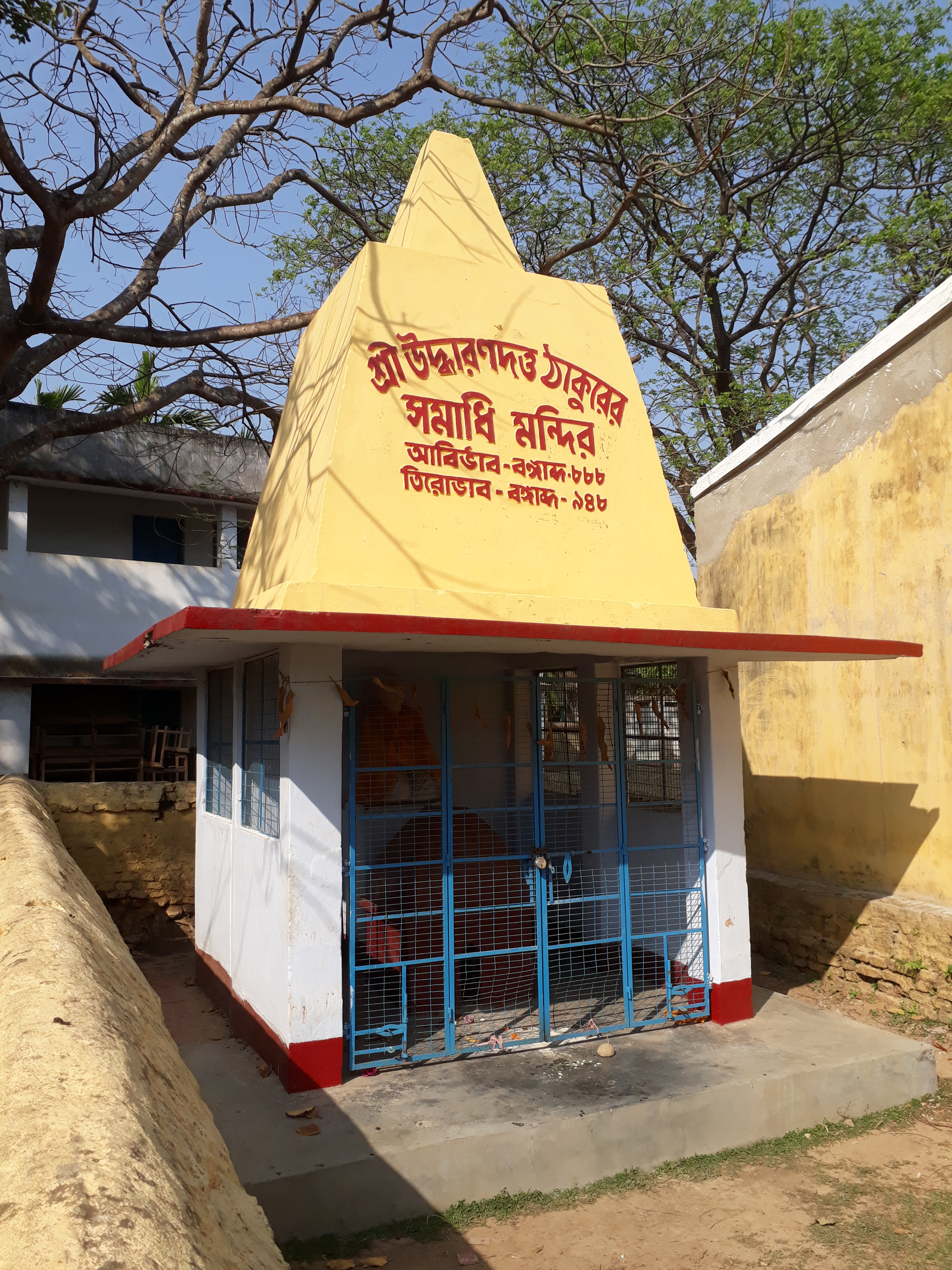
Uddharan Dutta Samadhi in Uddharanpur

Umapati Dhara, a minister in the court of Lakshmana Sena (c. 1178–1206), who was also one of the court poet of Lakshmana Sena. Several Prashasti like the Deopara Prashasti, a stone inscription eulogizing the Sena kings of Bengal was written by him. His father Kanjilal Dhar was lived in Sonergram, whose sister Bhagabati Devi was married to Bhabesh Dutta Ballāla Sena. Ballāla Sena regularly took big amount of loans from Gouri Sen and other members of Subarna Banik Community but never refound it. The community soon realize that Ballal Sen was misusing the whole money. So they decided that they wouldn't give him any more loans. Ballāla Sena was very much infuriated. He invited them in a local event, and forced to sit with the Sudra Community which the whole Suvarna Banik Community refused. After that Ballāla Sena created a whole social conspiracy and made this whole Suvarna Baniks were outcastes and lower category. They were not Brahmans, Kshatriyas, Vaishyas, and announced them as equal to Shudras. Although the Subarna Banik Community wearing upabits they are treated as Sudras after the announcement. Ballāla Sena actually succeeded to publicly ostracize the whole community of Soner Gram from any respectability. People would mistreated with them, soon they were taken away from any religious privileges and lived under that dark cloud for a long time. At that time they started to flee away from Sonar Gram and started to find selter in different places in Bengal. Bhabesh Dutta finds a selter in Mithila. After the death of Ballal Sen, Umapati Dhara request to Lakshmana Sena to brings back his aunt as his father Kanjilal Dhar was worried about his sister. The Dutta family soon came back and started to live in Saptagram which was a major port, the chief city and sometimes capital of southern Bengal, in that times. Uddharana Dutta was the ninth generation direct descendant of Krishna Dutta, son of Bhabesh Dutta.

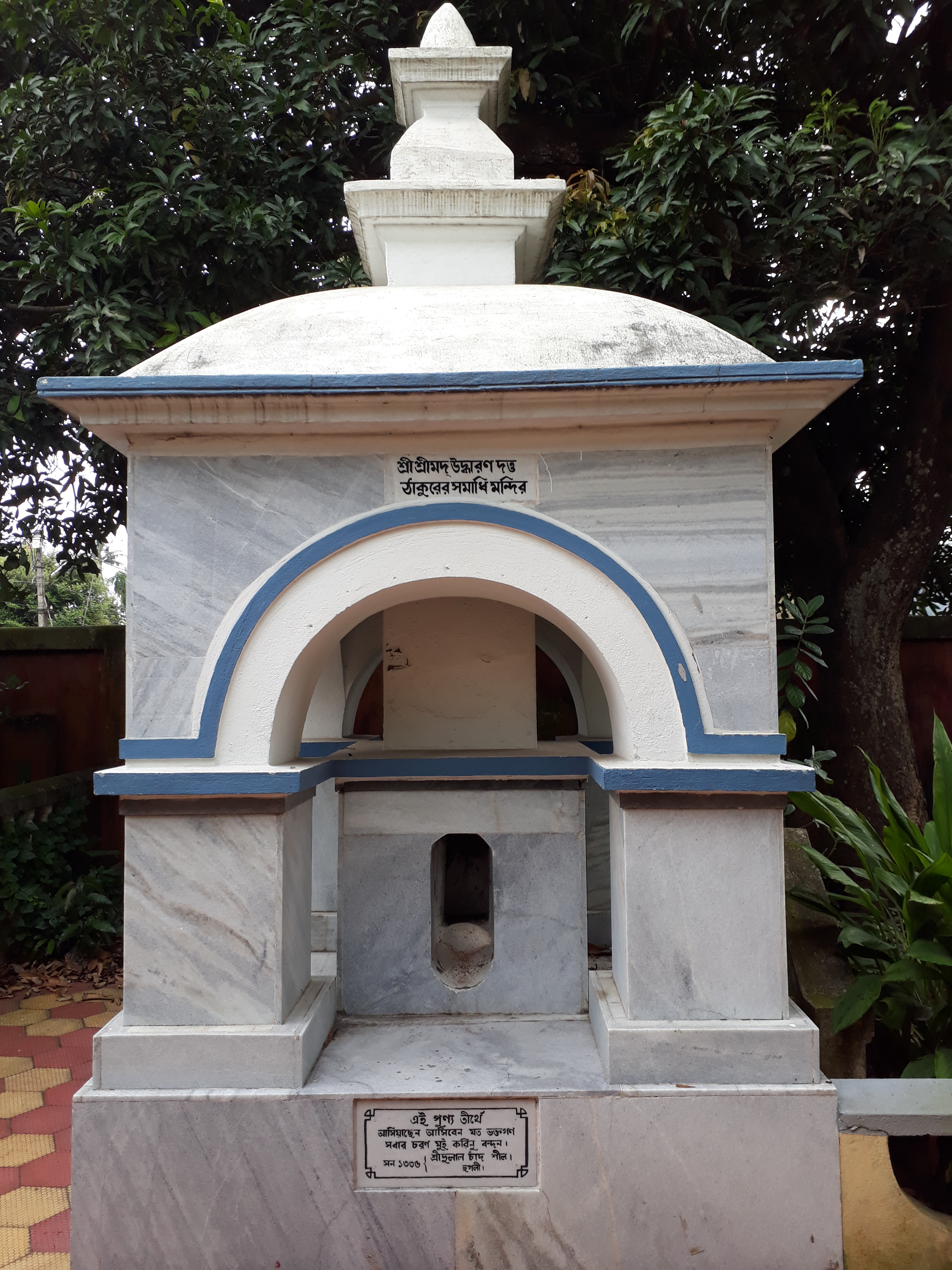
Uddharan Dutta Samadhi in Saptagram

== Birth and early life ==
Uddharan Dutta Takur was born in the Saptagram area of Hooghly district, Bengal Sultanate, present-day West Bengal, India as Divakara Dutta. His mother was Bhadravati Devi, His father Srikara Dutta's family was from Subarna Gram in East Bengal. Divakar Dutta was the estate manager of a big Zamindar (Nairaja of Naihati old name Nabahatta) in Naihati, which was about one and a half miles north of the city Katwa. The relics of this royal family of Nairaja are still visible near the Dainhat railway station. Since Divakara Dutta was the manager of the estate, and he has an office there, the Jamindari place was bought from Nabab Husen Sah by Divakara Dutta (Uddharan Dutta Thakura) now known as Uddharanpur.

=== Uddharana Dutta Thakur leaves home ===
Divakara Dutta married to Suprasanna Devi who is the sister of Haladhar Sen. Haladhar Sen is a direct descendant of Gouri Sen. But his wife died in a young age at the time of giving delivery of their only son at that time he was only 26. When Nityananda Prabhu returned to Bengal at Chaitanya Mahaprabhu's request, He decided to abandon His avadhuta status and get married after receiving Lord Caitanya's instructions. Nityananda remained a few days in Khardaha (Now in North 24 prgs) and then went on to Saptagram with his troupe of associates. They stayed at the home of the Divakara Dutta on the banks of the Triveni for continuously more than three months. Completely surrendered to the feet of Nityananda Prabhu Divakara Dutta worshipped him and became his favorite cook. The entire caste of gold merchants was purified by the presence of Divakara Datta at the time of his initiation (Diksha) by Nityananda Prabhu (RadhaKrishna Mantra) in the Saptami of Bengali Aghrahayana month. After Nityananda Prabhu's instructed him not to wear Upabita and from that time he stopped to wearing Upabita. From that time Bengali Baishya and Khratya community from the Bengali Hindu culture stopped to wearing Upabita After the initiation (Diksha) he was named as Uddharana Dutta Thakura. Uddharana Dutta Thakura started a Doi-Chida Utsav by the order of Nityananda Prabhu in Saptagram. Later the marriage of Nityananda Prabhu was aided by the help of Uddharan Dutta Thakur. He spend Rs 10,000/- at his guru"s marriage.

=== Charity Work ===
Uddharana Dutta Thakura started an Anna satra in the dearth of 1507 AD. He used 30 Bigha of land for the work of Kitchen and storeroom for that purpose. The place is now known as Tiris Bigha Gram. The land was later donate for Adi Saptagram Railway Station. He cleaned Bhedobana (Bhadra Bana and made small cottages for poor people

== Later life ==
=== Puri, Vrindavana, and disappearance ===
Uddharan Dutta Thakur leaves Saptagram in the year 1515 AD and joined Sri Chaitanya Mahaprabhu at Puri in that year. He regularly cooked for Sri Chaitanya Mahaprabhu. After staying 6 years in Puri, he went on to Vrindavana in middle of the year 1534 AD where he stayed for another six years with Six Goswamis of Vrindavana. Uddharan Datta Thakur left this world in the Shaka year 1463 (AD 1541), on the Krisna trayodasi of the month of Paush. His main Samadhi Mandir was near Banshi Vat temple in Vrindavana. Later his two body parts were taken into West Bengal, one in Saptagram and other in Uddharanpur and made individual Samadhi temple there.

== See also ==
- Krishnology
- Hare Krishna mantra
- Nityananda
- Gaudiya Math
- International Society for Krishna Consciousness
- Svayam bhagavan
- Bhakti Yoga
- Chaitanya Mahaprabhu
- Gaudiya Vaishnava
- Mayapur
- Pancha Tattva (Vaishnavism)
