= Uddharanpur =

- Village
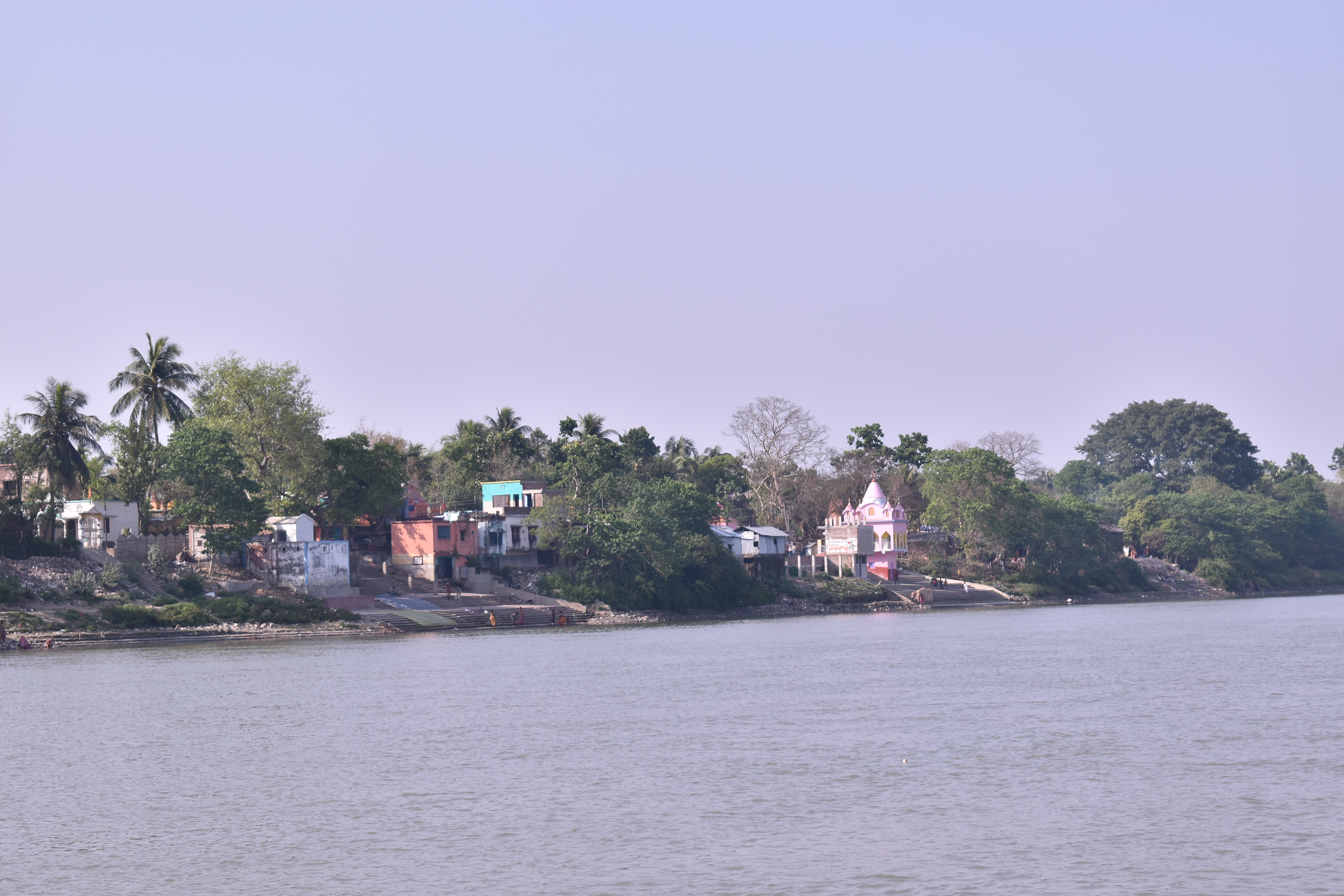
- Uddharanpur Ghat

- Location in West Bengal Uddharanpur (India)
- Coordinates: 23.685667°N 88.1391889°E
- Country: India
- State: West Bengal
- District: Purba Bardhaman
- Subdistrict: Ketugram II
- Gram Panchayet: Sitahati

Population (2011)
  - Total: 3,437
- Time zone: UTC+05:30 (IST)
- Pincode: 713123 (Sankhai)
- Former name: Radhekeshtapur
- Police station: Ketugram
- Website: purbabardhaman.gov.in

Uddharanpur is a village in Ketugram II CD block in Katwa subdivision of Purba Bardhaman district in West Bengal, India. The village named after the Hindu saint Uddharan Dutta Thakura who was the famous Zamindar and working for the (Nairaja of Naihati old Nabahatta) in Naihati and later a close associate of Nityananda Prabhu and Sri Chaitanya Mahaprabhu.

== Geography ==
Cities and towns in the Katwa subdivision of Purba Bardhaman district
M: municipal city/ town, CT: census town, R: rural/ urban centre, H: historical place/ religious and/ or cultural centre, C: craft centre.
Owing to space constraints in the small map, the actual locations in a larger map may vary slightly

== Demographics ==
As per the 2011 Census of India Uddharanpur had a total population of 3,437, of which 1,831 (53%) were males and 1,606 (47%) were females. Population below 6 years was 330. The total number of literates in Uddharanpur was 2,667 (85.84% of the population over 6 years).

== Festivals and Culture ==
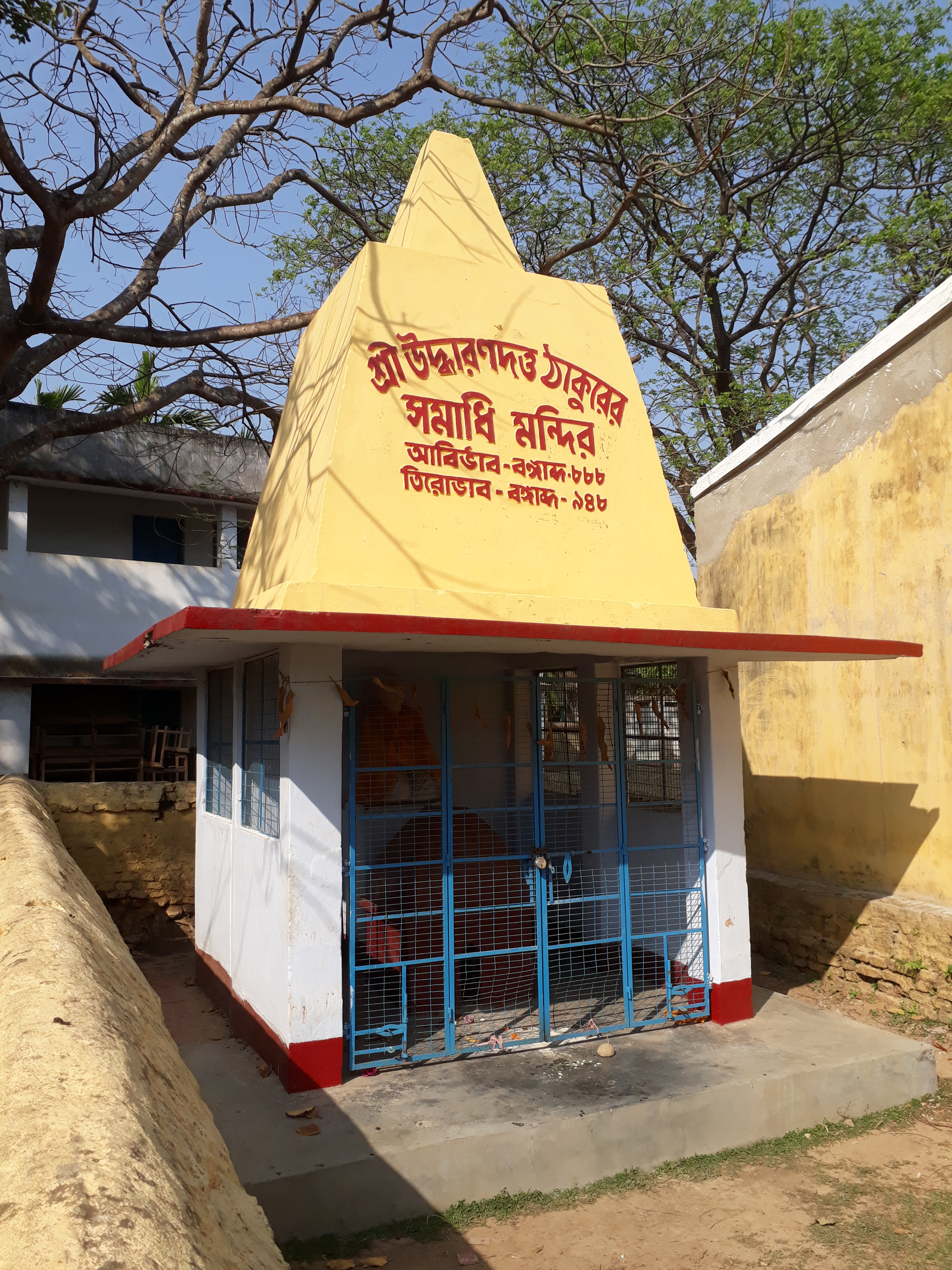
Uddharan Dutta Samadhi temple complex at Uddharanpur

There are many festival in Uddharanpur. The Annual fair of Uddharanpur is very popular. People from many other places are come to join the fair. It is held on January, beside the Uddharanpur Bazar in the Melar Math. The saint novelist Kalikananda Abadhuta (1910 — 1978) resided in the Burning Ghat of Uddharanpur beside the Bhagirathi River. He wrote a novel on this village named Uddharanpurer Ghat. based on the life of the village.

== Schools ==
- Uddharanpur G.S.F.P School
- Uddharanpur Madhyamik Sikshya Kendra

== Connectivity ==
The village is well connected to Bolpur-Shantiniketan and Asansol by the buses plying on Bolpur road. In order to reach the village via railways one has to get down on Gangatikuri railway station which lies on the Katwa-Azimganj line route. The village can be reached by the waterways by the ferries plying on Hooghly river from Katwa and Bhagyabantipur village (in Nadia district). It is connected to the nearby town of Katwa via roadways and waterways.
