= Gonna Serandi =

- Village
- Location in West Bengal, India Gonna Serandi (India)
- Coordinates: 23°40′0″N 87°55′0″E
- Country: India
- State: West Bengal
- District: Purba Bardhaman

Languages
  - Official: Bengali, English
- Time zone: UTC+5:30 (IST)
- PIN: 731215
- Vehicle registration: WB-
- Coastline: 0 kilometres (0 mi)
- Nearest city: Bolpur, Kirnahar

Gonna Serandi is a village in Ketugram I CD block in Katwa subdivision of Purba Bardhaman district, West Bengal, India. The village lies on the Purba Bardhaman-Birbhum border and some parts of the village lies in Birbhum district, named as Atgram, Dhapdhara & Chak Atgram.

== Geography ==
This village lies on the border of the districts of Purba Bardhaman and Birbhum of West Bengal. It is connected by the famous Badshahi Road which leads to Barddhaman town in the south and Berhampore of Murshidabad district in the north.

Towards the west is famous Nanoor (birthplace of Chandidas), Bolpur-Santiniketan (home of Visva Bharati University founded by Nobel laureate Rabindranath Tagore and of Amartya Sen). But people mostly go to nearby Kirnahar or Katwa for shopping/business needs. The village is situated at the border of two districts, southern part belongs to Birbhum and northern part belongs to Burdwan (Barddhaman) district. Post office PIN is 731215, belongs to Khujutipara (Birbhum) but the postmaster's residence-cum-office is in Majhpara which is in Bardhaman district.

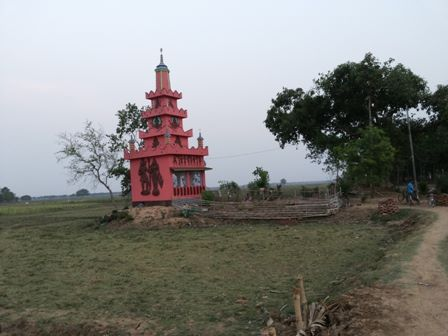
Shiva Temple

The village is relatively big among the neighboring villages, hosting one high school and three primary schools. Nearest primary health care centres are at Nanoor (Birbhum) and Kandra (Burdwan) respectively. The village hosts about 14 Durga Puja all are private except one in Majhpara. There are two three clubs organized by local youth dedicated for local welfare activities. The villagers proudly boasts of Kartik puja which is celebrated with big fanfare. Gonna Serandi high school (which was established by Mr. Harendranath Pal), in middle of the village, relatively old and big school in the neighbouring region catering to the students from neighbouring villages like Balishwar, Angora. The connecting road between Balishwar and Serandi is of very poor condition. So students face problem to come to Serandi High School.

== Demographics ==
As per the 2011 Census of India Serandi (Bardhaman) had a total population of 2,683, of which 1,400 (52%) were males and 1,283 (48%) were females. Population below 6 years was 274. The total number of literates in Serandi was 1,727 (71.69% of the population over 6 years). Whereas Atgram, Dhapdhara & Chak Atgram had population of 1037, 922, 239 respectively. Taken together, total Gonna Serandi population was 4881 in 2011 and taking 10% decadal growth rate, current population in 2020 would be below 6000 out of which 80% would be literate.

== Transport ==
The village is 2 km from the village bus stand. Well connected by direct buses to Berhampur, Bardhaman, Bolpur & Katwa.

Direct buses to Kolkata (Dharmatala): 5:45, 6:10, 6:30, 7:00, 7:10, 7:30, 7:45, 8:10 AM. All stop at Pirtala Natungram. Return from Kolkata (Dharmatala):2:00, 2:15, 2:40, 3:10 PM.

Bus to other Major cities: Berhampore, Murshidabad: 77 km; Durgapur, Bardhaman: 53 km; Sainthia: 53 km; Suri:60 km; Ilambazar:43 km

Nearest railway stations: Bolpur-Santiniketan (30 km), Katwa (40 km), Bardhaman (53 km).

Nearest Airport: Dumdum airport (154 km), Durgapur (Andal) [93 km]

Internet/Phone Connectivity: Airtel and Reliance Jio gives good signal.
