= Marutirtha Hinglaj =

- Directed by: Bikash Roy
- Written by: Kalikananda Abadhuta
- Screenplay by: Bikash Roy (Dialogues)
- Based on: Marutirtha Hinglaj novel by Kalikananda Abadhuta
- Produced by: Bikash Roy
- Starring: Uttam Kumar, Sabitri Chatterjee, Anil Chatterjee, Bikash Roy
- Cinematography: Anil Gupta
- Edited by: Kamal Ganguly
- Music by: Hemanta Mukherjee
- Production company: Bikash Roy Productions
- Distributed by: Janata Pictures And Theaters Limited
- Release date: 12 February 1959
- Country: India
- Language: Bengali

Marutirtha Hinglaj (English: Hinglaj, the Desert Shrine) is a 1959 Indian Bengali-language drama film directed and produced by Bikash Roy. This was based on a same name travelogue of Bengali novelist Kalikananda Abadhuta. The film was made under the banner of Bikash Roy Productions and Janata Pictures and Theatres Limited. The lead actors are Uttam Kumar, Sabitri Chatterjee, and Anil Chatterjee. The music is composed by Hemanta Mukherjee.

== Plot ==
The plot revolves around a religious but dangerous journey towards the sacred temple at Hinglaj. A group of pilgrims undertake the long journey through the desert to reach the holy shrine where pilgrims can be washed of all their sins. The group rescue a dying couple, Thirumal and Kunti, who also join in the pilgrimage. While they walk hundreds of miles through the desert they face hardship and life-threatening challenges.

== Cast ==
- Uttam Kumar as Thirumal
- Sabitri Chatterjee as Kunti
- Bikash Roy as Abadhoot
- Anil Chatterjee as Rooplal
- Pahari Sanyal as Popatlal Patel
- Chandrabati Devi as Bhairabi
- Shyam Laha
- Moni Sreemani

== Production ==
The film was directed, produced and screenplay by Bikash Roy who also acted in the film. The film was originally shot in Digha. A desert was created on the beach sands near Digha. Bikash Roy brought two camels for use in the film. In a highly dramatic moment, a mentally deranged Thirumal suddenly grabs Kunti by the throat. Uttam Kumar has been quiet since a few days that scene was taken. Uttam Kumar visions is quite unusual. When the scene shooting started Uttam pressed Sabitri's throat it was as if he was no longer himself. Sabitri was getting suffocated. Director Bikash Roy rushed after finishing the shot. Sabitri then has no sense, he vomited and passed out. After curing him with water, Bikash Roy scolded to Uttam Kumar. Then Uttam apologized to Sabitri. In the end of the film director was saved by four bottles of Bengali liquor. The film was also shot in Chakulia, two days in Ghatsila. Far way from Digha city the camera will capture the desert of Baluchistan on the sand.

== Soundtrack ==
Marutirtha Hinglaj

Soundtrack album by Hemanta Mukherjee
- Released: 1959
- Recorded: 1958
- Studio: Bikash Roy Production Pvt Ltd
- Genre: Feature Film Soundtrack
- Length: 12:55
- Label: Sa Re Ga Ma Pa
- Producer: Bikash Roy

Hemanta Mukherjee chronology
Khelaghar (1959)	Marutirtha Hinglaj (1959)	Sonar Harin (1959)

All lyrics are written by Gouri Prasanna Majumdar; all music is composed by Hemanta Mukherjee.

Songs
No.	Title	Playback	Length
1.	"Pather Klanti Bhule"	Hemanta Mukherjee	3:14
2.	"Hey Chandrachur"	Hemanta Mukherjee	2:27
3.	"Sarbasya Buddhirupena"	Hemanta Mukherjee	2:22
4.	"Tomar Bhubane Mago"	Hemanta Mukherjee, Chorus	2:37
Total length:			10:40
