= Gangatikuri =

- Village
- Location in West Bengal, India Gangatikuri (India)
- Coordinates: 23°42′49.2″N 88°05′52.4″E
- Country: India
- State: West Bengal
- District: Purba Bardhaman

Population (2011)
  - Total: 4,053

Languages
  - Official: Bengali, English
- Time zone: UTC+5:30 (IST)
- PIN: 713123 (Gangatikuri)
- Telephone/STD code: 03453
- Lok Sabha constituency: Bolpur
- Vidhan Sabha constituency: Ketugram
- Website: purbabardhaman.gov.in

Gangatikuri is a village in Ketugram II CD block in Katwa subdivision of Purba Bardhaman district in the state of West Bengal, India.

== Geography ==
Cities and towns in the Katwa subdivision of Purba Bardhaman district
M: municipal city/ town, CT: census town, R: rural/ urban centre, H: historical place/ religious and/ or cultural centre.
Owing to space constraints in the small map, the actual locations in a larger map may vary slightly

=== CD block HQ ===
The headquarters of Ketugram II CD block are located at Gangatikuri.

=== Urbanisation ===
88.44% of the population of Katwa subdivision live in the rural areas. Only 11.56% of the population live in the urban areas. The map alongside presents some of the notable locations in the subdivision. All places marked in the map are linked in the larger full screen map.

== Demographics ==
As per the 2011 Census of India Gangatikuri had a total population of 4,053, of which 2,064 (51%) were males and 1,989 (49%) were females. Population below 6 years was 476. The total number of literates in Gangatikuri was 2,067 (57.79% of the population over 6 years).

== Transport ==
Gangatikuri railway station is situated on the Barharwa-Azimganj-Katwa loop.

Gangatikuri is on the Uddharanpur-Bolpur/ Suri Road.

Gangatikuri' nearest railway station pachundi station of katwa-amudpur loop line

== Education ==
Gangatikuri Atindra Nath Bidyamandir, Gangatikuri

Sonartori College of Education at village Balutia, PO Banwaribad, is located near Gangatikuri railway station.

Gangatikui Girls School, Gangatikuri

Vision English medium School, Kalitala, Gangatikuri

MSVR Mission Academy, Gangatikuri

== Animal Hospital & Administrative Offices ==
Block Livestock Development Office, Ketugram II & Block Animal Health Centre, Ketugram II is situated at Gangatikuri village. BAHC, Gangatikuri, Ketugram II is the only animal hospital situated in Ketugram II Block which provide veterinary treatment facilities for both pet & livestock.

Block Development Office, Ketugram II is situated at Gangatikuri Village which is the main administrative office of the Ketugram-II Block.

Block Land & Land Revenue Office, Assistant Director of Agriculture Office, Sub Inspector of School Office of the Ketugram-II Community Development Block are also situated at this village.
