= Suvarna Banik =

Mercantile caste of Bengal

Suvarna Banik or Subarnabanik (Bengali: সুবর্ণ বণিক), also called Bene, is a Bengali mercantile caste dealing in gold and silver. During the late 18th century, merchants of the caste became prominent in trade. In spite of their inferior ritual rank, they were the most well known trading caste in Bengal region as per the 1951 Census of India.

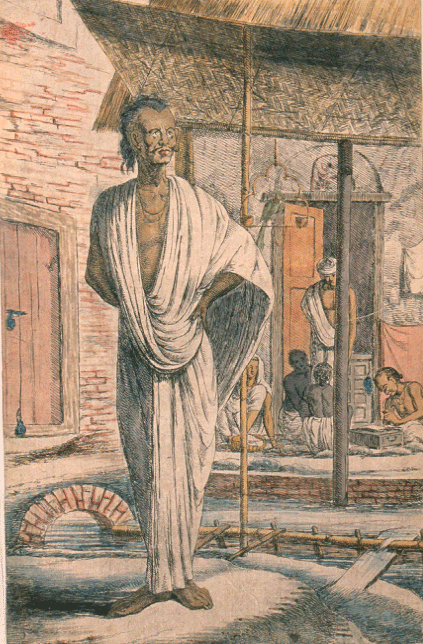
Subarnabanik money changer of Calcutta, from a 1799 collection of etchings

== Origin and history ==
=== Origin and early medieval period ===
The presence and activity of mercantile groups in Bengal becomes visible in historical records from the mid-fifth century onwards, due to the so-called land sale grants issued under the Gupta provincial administration of Pundravardhana-bhukti of North Bengal. After two-and-a-half centuries of absence, merchant groups reappear in the inscriptions of Bengal and the adjoining areas from the early ninth century onwards, but they cease to appear in the inscriptions of Bengal and Bihar from the mid-twelfth century.

The thirteenth century Hindu text Bṛhaddharma Puraṇa placed Suvarnabaniks in middle-ranking Shudras but Vallalcharita degraded them from that position. The social order described in the Brihaddharma Purana consists of bipolarity of brahmins and shudras without intermediate varnas of Kshatriya and Vaishya. It indicates that Brahmins probably attained some level of hegemony in that period with which they could attempt to impose their idealized social order. However this imposition entailed tension and negotiation between brahmins and other social groups including merchants, as the text suggests. Historian Furui concludes that the imposition of inferior ritual ranks on merchant groups were attempts by brahmins to restrain them.

The characteristics of Vallal Charita, which was written in the sixteenth century depicting the Bengali society of the twelfth century, were that legends or prevailing traditions of that times were well mixed with historical facts. The listing of Suvarnabanik caste first in the sat (clean) category, and then in the asat (unclean) category, with the explanation that they became degraded, is significant. According to historian Nihar Ranjan Ray, there is possibly some truth to the belief that these trading castes were degraded by King Vallalasena. Suvarnabaniks displeased him by refusing to lend him money when it was wanted, and that he raised the four other castes to the status of sat Sudras because they happened to have pleased him, may have been true. Finally, Vallalsena's particular animosity against the Suvarnabaniks, who were allies and related to the Palas, furnished an admirable historical background. Before the seventh or the eighth centuries A.D. when historical evidences indicate that the society was based largely on trade and commerce, the merchant classes had a notably high position in the society. But since trade and commerce declined, and the society became more and more dependent on cottage industries and agriculture, the caste ranks of the merchant classes became more and more lowered, and reached a decidedly low stage at the beginning of the Sena and Varman periods, whereas the ritual ranking of most of the craft castes became relatively high at that time.

=== Late medieval and colonial period ===
The rich Suvarna Banik community, which didn't have much social status, zealously joined Hare Krishna Bhakti movement of Chaitanya Mahaprabhu to enhance their social status. Despite holding low ceremonial rank for centuries, gold merchants of Subarnabanik caste were affluent people. In the days of the East India Company and the early days of the British rule, they were important persons in the new political system. The British merchants borrowed money and maintained other economic transactions with Subarnabaniks. The Subarnabaniks gained important positions in the secular urban society which was then developing under the influence of British rulers. Subarnabaniks were among the oldest settlers of Calcutta and in the early days certain parts of the city became identified as their settlements. With a long tradition of city living, the Subarnabanik caste kept gaining in the secular values of the society. The discrepancy between low ceremonial rank and high-secular rank was always a problem. Many Banik castes including Subarnabanik provided the most glaring examples of this anomaly. In 1854 Vidyasagar had scoffed at the representation of the wealthy goldsmith caste of Bengal for admission in the Sanskrit college; His argument to deny their prayer was that - “in the scale of castes, the class (goldsmith or Subarnabanik) stands very low”. As per census reports of 1901 and 1911 Subarnabaniks had third highest literacy among Hindu castes of Bengal.

=== Modern period ===
Historian N K Sinha (1967) blamed Vallal Sena, who ruled Bengal in the twelfth century, for the dominance of non-Bengali merchants in Bengal. In Sena's canonical establishment of caste precedence in Bengal, he downgraded the Vaishya Subarnabanik bankers (gold traders) to Sudra, as they refused to advance him the amount of money he wanted. Further after marginalizing the Vaishya merchant community, the King created a powerful upper caste 'service community', that continued to dominate West Bengal's socio economic space. As of 1980, Bengali Suvarnabanik was a prosperous merchant community in West Bengal.

== Notable people ==
- A. C. Bhaktivedanta Swami Prabhupada(1896-1977): Founder of International Society for Krishna Consciousness (ISKCON)
- Mutty Lall Seal, Indian businessman and philanthropist
- Ramdulal Sarkar (Dey), Indian merchant
- Rajendra Mullick, Indian philanthropist, builder of Marble Palace (Kolkata)
- Lal Behari Dey (Mondal), Indian writer and journalist
- Uddarana Datta Thakura, Gaudiya Vaisnava saint, One of the Dvadasha Gopalas, principle associate of Sri Nityananda Prabhu and Lord Chaitanya Mahaprabhu
