= Kalikananda Abadhut =

Indian writer and traveller (1910–1978)

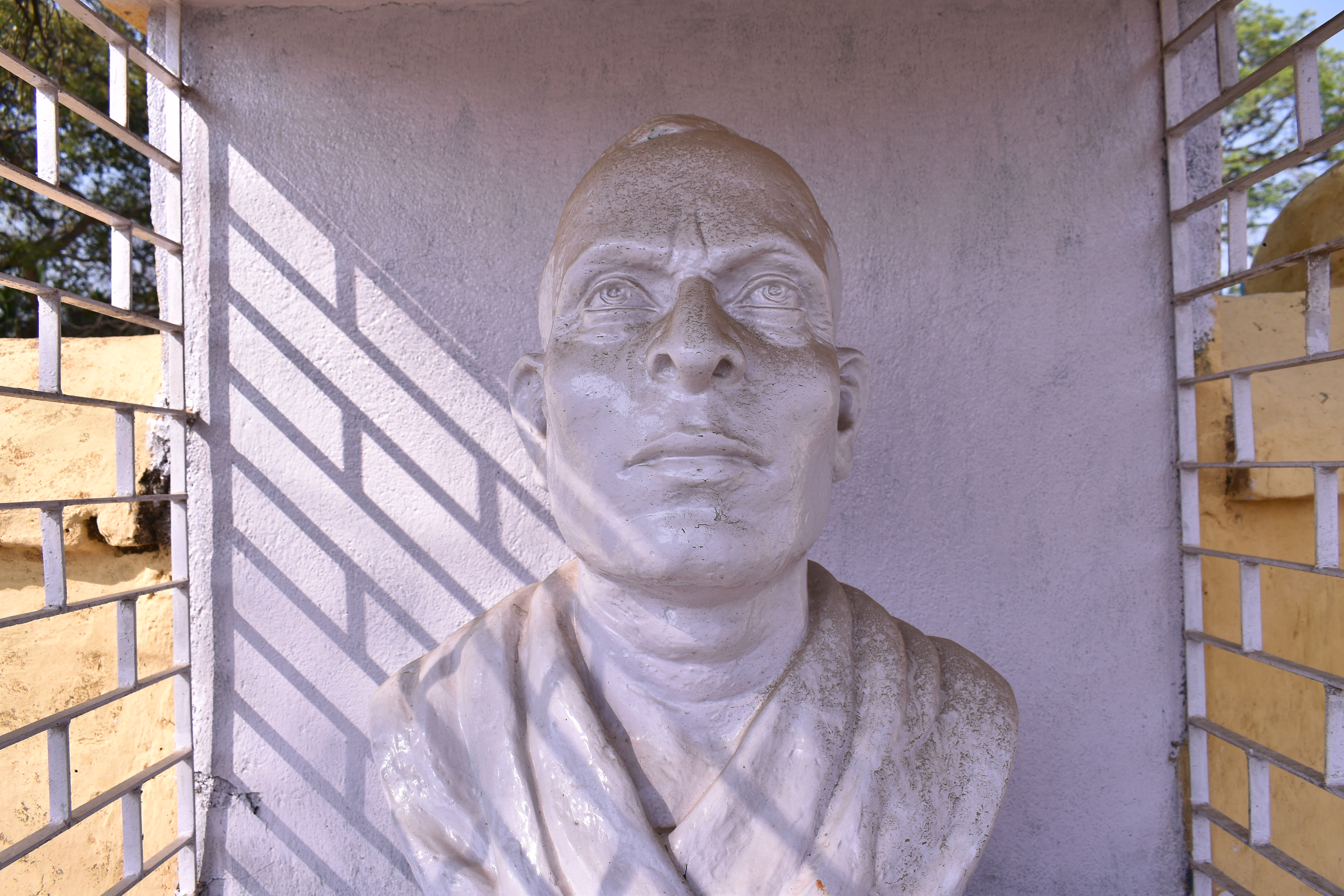
- Born: Dulal Chandra Mukherjee; 2 November 1910; Bhawanipore, Calcutta, Bengal Presidency, British India
- Died: 13 April 1978 (aged 67); Chinsurah, West Bengal, India
- Occupation: Writer
- Notable work: Marutirtha Hinglaj; Uddharanpurer Ghat

Dulal Chandra Mukherjee (2 November 1910—13 April 1978), known by his pen name Kalikananda Abadhut, was an Indian novelist, saint and traveller who wrote in Bengali language.

== Biography ==
Abadhut born to Anathnath Mukherjee in Bhowanipore, Calcutta (now Kolkata) of Bengal Presidency. His real name was Dulal Chandra Mukherjee but he took a pen name Kalikananda Abadhut. After the death of his wife he became saint in Mahakaleshwar Jyotirlinga Temple in Ujjain. He was mostly popular for his book Marutirtha Hinglaj which is based on real life experience about his pilgrimage to Hinglaj. The film Marutirtha Hinglaj on his travelogue was also released in 1959. He edited the book of Upanishads. He resided few years in Uddharanpur, Bardhaman to gather experiences before writing another novel Uddharanpurer Gat. Abadhuta also practised Tantra in his personal life. He established Rudrachandi Math in Chinsurah and live his last life there till death.

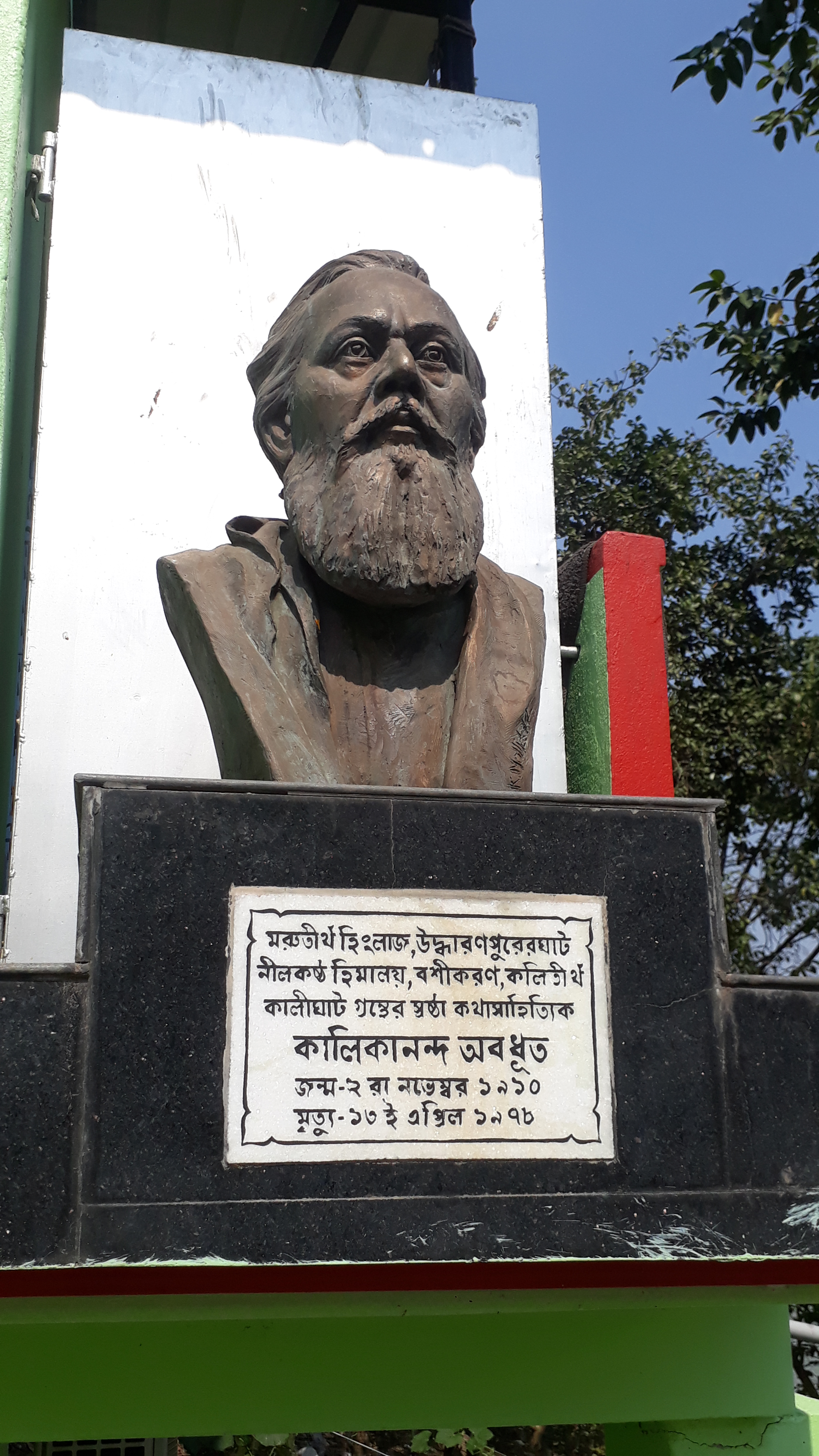
Statue of Kalikananda Abadhuta, beside his house at Chinsura, Hooghly

He was secretly associated with revolutionary work. He hid himself in different places for two decades. The names of those places are still unknown. He spent several places hiding in Faridpur of Bangladesh, Burma (now Myanmar) outside India, Ujjain in Madhya Pradesh. He was also a pujari of the Kalimandir of Kashi in Uttar Pradesh and also spent several years of his life at Jajan in Murshidabad, Uddharanpur Ghat in Burdwan. He also visited Hinglaj Mata mandir in Balochistan province of Pakistan.

== Works ==
- Bohubrihee
- Bashikaran
- Debarigan
- Hinglajer Pare
- Uddharanpurer Ghat
- Kalitirtha Kalighat
- Marutirtha Hinglaj
- Kaushiki Kanara
- Piyari
- Nilkantha Himalaya
- Sachcha Darbar
- Saptaswara Pinakini
- Tappa Thungri
- Subhaya Bhabatu
- Sumeru Kumeru
- Swamighatini
- Kan Pete Roi
- Mon Mane Na
- Sukh Shanti Valobasa
