= Ketugram =

- Village
- Location in West Bengal, India Ketugram (India)
- Coordinates: 23°42′06.0″N 88°02′38.0″E
- Country: India
- State: West Bengal
- District: East Burdwan

Population (2011)
  - Total: 9,990

Languages
  - Official: Bengali, English
- Time zone: UTC+5:30 (IST)
- PIN: 713140 (Ketugram)<
- Telephone/STD code: 03453
- Lok Sabha constituency: Bolpur
- Vidhan Sabha constituency: Ketugram
- Website: bardhaman.gov.in

Ketugram is a village in Ketugram II CD block in Katwa subdivision of East Burdwan district in the state of West Bengal, India.

== Etymology ==
It is said that Ketugram was named after Chandraketu, son of king Bhopal. The earlier name of Ketugram was Bahula.

== History ==
According to Binoy Ghosh, it is claimed by some that Ketugram was the birthplace of 14th century lyric poet Chandidas of Vaishnava Padavali fame. It is said that the people of Ketugram were furious with Chandidas for marrying a low-caste widow. He went away to Nanoor in the adjoining district of Birbhum, along with the idol of Bisalakshi that he used to worship. Later, when hostilities subsided, Chandidas was even accepted back in Ketugram as the priest of Bahulakshi temple. The place in the northern part of Ketugram, which is believed to be the birth-place of Chandidas, is even today referred to by the locals as “Chandibhita”.

== Geography ==
Cities and towns in the Katwa subdivision of Purba Bardhaman district
M: municipal city/ town, CT: census town, R: rural/ urban centre, H: historical place/ religious and/ or cultural centre, C: craft centre.
Owing to space constraints in the small map, the actual locations in a larger map may vary slightly

=== Physiography ===
Ketugram is in the flat alluvial Kanksa Ketugram plain, which lies along the Ajay.

=== Police station ===
Ketugram police station has jurisdiction over Ketugram I and Ketugram II CD Blocks. The area covered is 359 km^{2}.

=== Urbanisation ===
88.44% of the population of Katwa subdivision live in the rural areas. Only 11.56% of the population live in the urban areas. The map alongside presents some of the notable locations in the subdivision. All places marked in the map are linked in the larger full screen map.

== Demographics ==
As per the 2011 Census of India Ketugram had a total population of 9,990, of which 5,127 (51%) were males and 4,863 (49%) were females. Population below 6 years was 1,218. The total number of literates in Ketugram was 5,603 (63.87% of the population over 6 years).

== Bahula shakti peetha ==
Bahula, in Ketugram, is one of the fifty-one shakti peethas. The left foot of Sati fell here.

According to other sources, the left arm of Sati fell here. While Sati is worshipped as Bahula (lavish), Shiva is worshipped as Bhiruk (Sarvasiddhivinayak). The stone image of Bahula, along with those of Kartikeya and Ganesha, was established by Raja Chandraketu.

Note: Some sources mention the temple being on the bank of the Ajay River, but presently it is away from the river. See map above.

== Transport ==
The State Highway 6, running from Rajnagar (in Birbhum district) to Alampur (in (Howrah district), passes through Ketugram.

Ketugram is 8 km from Katwa Junction railway station.

== Education ==
Ketugram Sir Asutosh Memorial Institution, a coeducational institution, is affiliated with the West Bengal Board of Secondary Education. It is also affiliated with West Bengal Council of Higher Secondary Education. It was established in 1924.

== Healthcare ==
Ketugram block primary health centre at Ketugram (with 15 beds) is the main medical facility in Ketugram II CD block. There are primary health centres at Sibloon (with 10 beds) and Sitahati (with 4 beds). In 2012, the average monthly patients attending Ketugram BPHC were 7,034 and average monthly admissions were 86. It handled 657 annual emergency admissions.

See also - Healthcare in West Bengal
